= England in the Late Middle Ages =

- 1216–1485
High Middle Ages	Tudor period
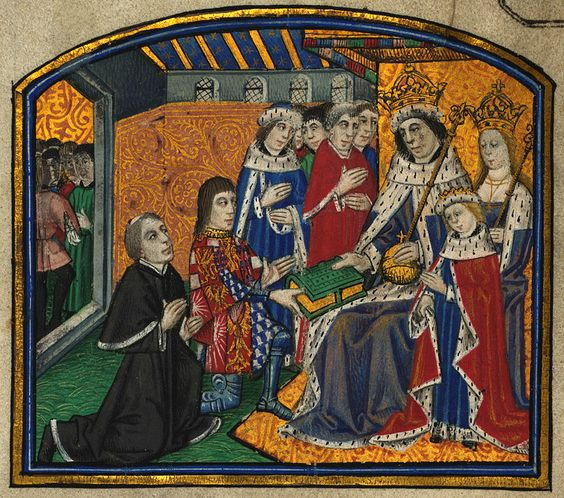
- Anthony Woodville, Earl Rivers & William Caxton presenting the first printed book in English to Edward IV
- Monarch: Plantagenets
- Key events: Crisis of Late Middle Ages; Peasants’ Revolt; Hundred Years’ War

The history of England during the Late Middle Ages covers from the thirteenth century, the end of the Angevins with the accession of Henry III until the accession to the throne of the Tudor dynasty in 1485, which is often taken as the most convenient marker for the end of the Middle Ages and the start of the English Renaissance and early modern Britain.

At the accession of Henry III only a remnant of English holdings remained in Gascony, for which English kings had to pay homage to the French, and the barons were in revolt. Royal authority was restored by his son who inherited the throne in 1272 as Edward I. He reorganized his possessions, and gained control of Wales and most of Scotland. His son Edward II was defeated at the Battle of Bannockburn in 1314 and lost control of Scotland. He was eventually deposed in a coup and from 1330 his son Edward III took control of the kingdom. Disputes over the status of Gascony led Edward III to lay claim to the French throne, resulting in the Hundred Years' War, in which the English enjoyed success, before a French resurgence during the reign of Edward III's grandson Richard II.

The fourteenth century saw the Great Famine and the Black Death, catastrophic events that killed around half of England's population, throwing the economy into chaos and undermining the old political order. With a shortage of farm labour, much of England's arable land was converted to pasture, mainly for sheep. Social unrest followed in the Peasants' Revolt of 1381.

Richard was deposed by Henry of Bolingbroke in 1399, who as Henry IV founded the House of Lancaster and reopened the war with France. His son Henry V won a decisive victory at Agincourt in 1415, reconquered Normandy and ensured that his infant son Henry VI would inherit both English and French crowns after his unexpected death in 1421. However, the French enjoyed another resurgence and by 1453 the English had lost almost all their French holdings. Henry VI proved a weak king and was eventually deposed in the Wars of the Roses, with Edward IV taking the throne as the first ruling member of the House of York. After his death and the taking of the throne by his brother as Richard III, an invasion led by Henry Tudor and his victory in 1485 at the Battle of Bosworth Field marked the end of the Plantagenet dynasty.

English government went through periods of reform and decay, with the Parliament of England emerging as an important part of the administration. Women had an important economic role, and noblewomen exercised power on their estates in their husbands' absence. The English began to see themselves as superior to their neighbours in the British Isles and regional identities continued to be significant. New reformed monastic orders and preaching orders reached England from the twelfth century, pilgrimage became highly popular and Lollardy emerged as a major heresy from the later fourteenth century. The Little Ice Age had a significant impact on agriculture and living conditions. Economic growth began to falter at the end of the thirteenth century, owing to a combination of overpopulation, land shortages and depleted soils. Technology and science was driven in part by the Greek and Islamic thinking that reached England from the twelfth century. In warfare, mercenaries were increasingly employed and adequate supplies of ready cash became essential for the success of campaigns. By the time of Edward III, armies were smaller, but the troops were better equipped and uniformed. Medieval England produced art in the form of paintings, carvings, books, fabrics and many functional but beautiful objects. Literature was produced in Latin and French. From the reign of Richard II there was an upsurge in the use of Middle English in poetry. Music and singing were important and were used in religious ceremonies, court occasions and to accompany theatrical works. During the twelfth century the style of Norman architecture became more ornate, with pointed arches derived from France, termed Early English Gothic.

== Political history ==
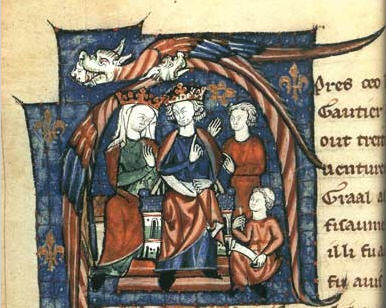
Twelfth-century depiction of Henry II and Eleanor of Aquitaine holding court

=== House of Plantagenet ===
==== Background ====
The marriage of Empress Matilda and Count Geoffrey V of Anjou led to the union of Anjou, Normandy and England by 1154, while the marriage of their son Henry Curtmantle to Eleanor of Aquitaine expanded the family's holdings southwards into what was later termed the Angevin Empire. Henry consolidated his holdings and acquired nominal control in Wales and the Lordship of Ireland. His son Richard I was a largely absentee king, concerned more with the crusades and his holdings in France. His brother John's defeats in France weakened his position in England. The rebellion of his English vassals resulted in the treaty called Magna Carta, which limited royal power and established common law. This would form the basis of every constitutional battle through the thirteenth and fourteenth centuries. However, both the barons and the crown failed to abide by the terms of Magna Carta, leading to the First Barons' War in which the rebel barons invited an invasion by Louis of France. John's death and William Marshall's appointment as the protector of the nine-year-old Henry III are considered by some historians to mark the end of the Angevin period and the beginning of the Plantagenet dynasty.

==== Henry III (1216–72) ====
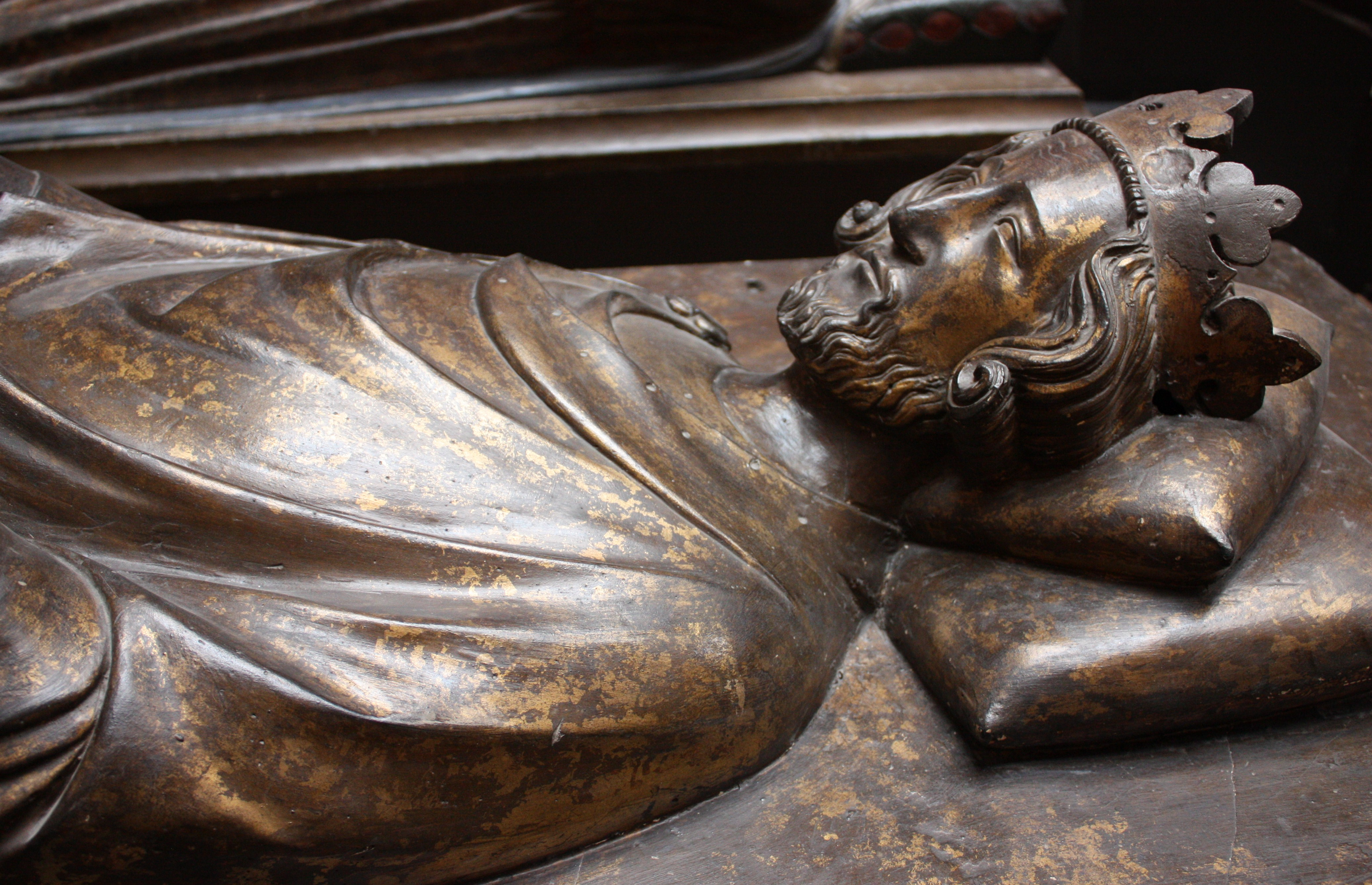
Cast of the effigy of Henry III in Westminster Abbey, c. 1272

When Henry III came to the throne in 1216, much of his holdings on the continent were occupied by the French and many of the barons were in rebellion as part of the First Barons' War. In addition, local violence was such a large problem during his reign overall that justiciars, "sheriffs, burgesses[,]...and knights of the shire" alike, and individuals from other occupations and social classes, often dealt with it in their careers at different periods in Henry III's kingship. Marshall won the war with victories at the battles of Lincoln and Dover in 1217, leading to the Treaty of Lambeth by which Louis renounced his claims. In victory, the Marshal Protectorate reissued Magna Carta as a basis for future government. Despite the treaty hostilities continued and Henry was forced to make significant constitutional concessions to the newly crowned Louis VIII of France and Henry's stepfather Hugh X of Lusignan. Between them, they overran much of the remnants of Henry's continental holdings, further eroding the Plantagenet grip on the continent. Henry saw such similarities between himself and England's then patron saint Edward the Confessor in his struggle with his nobles that he gave his first son the Anglo-Saxon name Edward and built the saint a magnificent, still-extant shrine at Westminster.

The barons were resistant to the cost in men and money required to support a war to restore Plantagenet holdings on the continent. In order to motivate his barons, Henry III reissued Magna Carta and the Charter of the Forest in return for a tax that raised the huge sum of £45,000. This was enacted in an assembly of the barons, bishops and magnates that created a compact in which the feudal prerogatives of the king were debated and discussed in the political community. Henry was forced to agree to the Provisions of Oxford by barons led by his brother-in-law, Simon de Montfort, under which his debts were paid in exchange for substantial reforms. He was also forced to agree to the Treaty of Paris with Louis IX of France, acknowledging the loss of the Dukedom of Normandy, Maine, Anjou and Poitou, but retaining the Channel Islands. The treaty held that "islands (if any) which the king of England should hold", he would retain "as peer of France and Duke of Aquitaine". In exchange Louis withdrew his support for English rebels, ceded three bishoprics and cities, and was to pay an annual rent for possession of Agenais. Disagreements about the meaning of the treaty began as soon as it was signed. The agreement resulted in English kings having to pay homage to the French monarch, thus remaining French vassals, but only on French soil. This was one of the indirect causes of the Hundred Years War.

===== Second Barons War and the establishment of Parliament =====
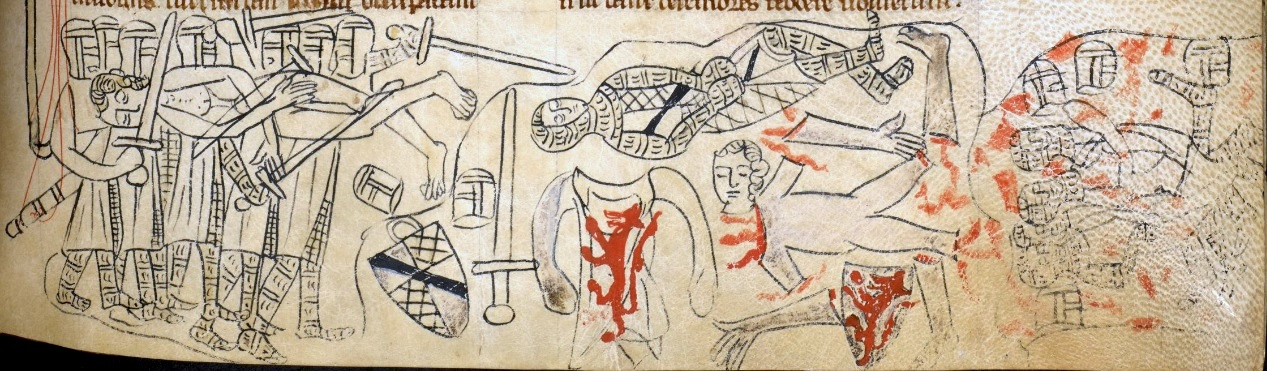
Death and mutilation of Simon de Montfort at the Battle of Evesham

Friction intensified between the barons and the king. Henry repudiated the Provisions of Oxford and obtained a papal bull in 1261 exempting him from his oath. Both sides began to raise armies. Prince Edward, Henry's eldest son, was tempted to side with his godfather Simon de Montfort, and supported holding a Parliament in his father's absence, before he decided to support his father. The barons, under Montfort, captured most of south-eastern England. The war, its prelude and aftermath, included a wave of violence targeting Jewish communities in order to destroy evidence of the Baron's debts, a particular grievance of the rebels. 500 Jews died in London, and communities were decimated in Worcester, Canterbury and elsewhere. At the Battle of Lewes in 1264, Henry and Edward were defeated and taken prisoner. Montfort summoned the Great Parliament, regarded as the first English Parliament worthy of the name because it was the first time cities and burghs sent representatives. Edward escaped and raised an army. He defeated and killed Montfort at the Battle of Evesham in 1265. Savage retribution was exacted on the rebels and authority was restored to Henry. Edward, having pacified the realm, left England to join Louis IX on the Ninth Crusade, funded by an unprecedented levy of one-twentieth of every citizen's movable goods and possessions. He was one of the last crusaders in the tradition aiming to recover the Holy Lands. Louis died before Edward's arrival and the result was anticlimactic; Edward's small force limited him to the relief of Acre and a handful of raids. Surviving a murder attempt by an assassin, Edward left for Sicily later in the year, never to return on crusade. The stability of England's political structure was demonstrated when Henry III died and his son succeeded as Edward I; the barons swore allegiance to Edward even though he did not return for two years.

==== Edward I (1272–1307) ====
===== Conquest of Wales =====
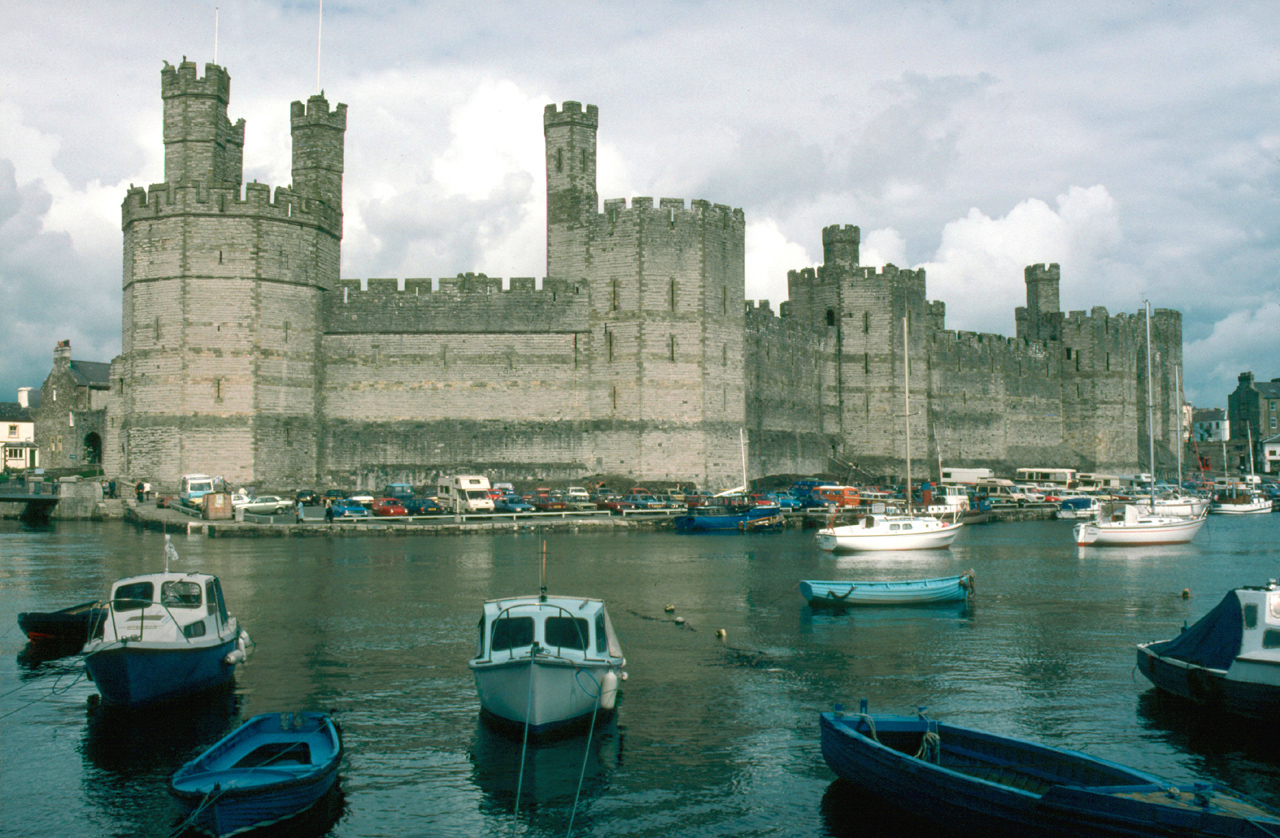
Caernarfon Castle, the "capital" of English rule in North Wales for two centuries after the conquest.

From the beginning of his reign Edward I sought to organise his inherited territories. As a devotee of the cult of King Arthur he also attempted to enforce claims to primacy within the British Isles. Wales consisted of a number of princedoms, often in conflict with each other. Llywelyn ap Gruffudd held north Wales in fee to the English king under the Treaty of Woodstock, but had taken advantage of the English civil wars to consolidate his position as Prince of Wales and maintained that his principality was 'entirely separate from the rights' of England. Edward considered Llywelyn 'a rebel and disturber of the peace'. Edward's determination, military experience and skillful use of ships ended Welsh independence by driving Llywelyn into the mountains. Llywelyn later died in battle. The Statute of Rhuddlan extended the shire system, bringing Wales into the English legal framework. When Edward's son was born he was proclaimed as the first English Prince of Wales. Edward's Welsh campaign produced one of the largest armies ever assembled by an English king in a formidable combination of heavy Anglo-Norman cavalry and Welsh archers that laid the foundations of later military victories in France. Edward spent around £173,000 on his two Welsh campaigns, largely on a network of castles to secure his control.

===== Domestic policy =====
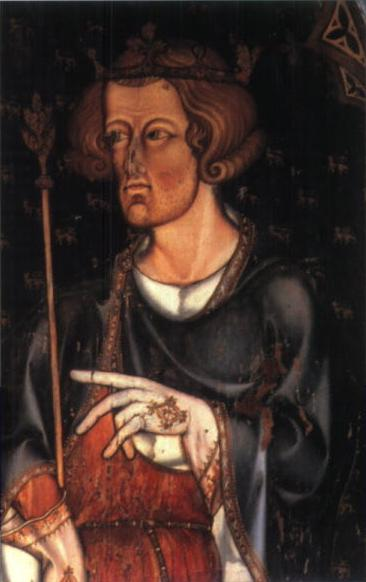
Edward imposed his authority over church and feudal society, annexed Wales and invaded Scotland

Because of his legal reforms Edward is sometimes called The English Justinian, although whether he was a reformer or an autocrat responding to events is debated. His campaigns left him in debt. This necessitated that he gain wider national support for his policies among lesser landowners, merchants and traders so that he could raise taxes through frequently summoned Parliaments. When Philip IV of France confiscated the duchy of Gascony in 1294, more money was needed to wage war in France. To gain financial support for the war effort, Edward summoned a precedent-setting assembly known as the Model Parliament, which included barons, clergy, knights and townspeople.

Edward imposed his authority on the Church with the Statutes of Mortmain that prohibited the donation of land to the Church, asserted the rights of the Crown at the expense of traditional feudal privileges, promoted the uniform administration of justice, raised income and codified the legal system. He also emphasised the role of Parliament and the common law through significant legislation, a survey of local government and the codification of laws originating from Magna Carta with the Statute of Westminster 1275. Edward also enacted economic reforms on wool exports to take customs, which amounted to nearly £10,000 a year, and imposed licence fees on gifts of land to the Church. Feudal jurisdiction was regulated by the Statute of Gloucester and Quo Warranto. The Statute of Winchester enforced Plantagenet policing authority. The Statute of Westminster 1285 kept estates within families: tenants only held property for life and were unable to sell the property. Quia Emptores stopped sub-infeudation where tenants subcontracted their properties and related feudal services.

====== Expulsion of the Jews ======
The oppression of Jews following their exclusion from the guarantees of Magna Carta peaked with Edward expelling them from England. Christians were forbidden by canon law from providing loans with interest, so the Jews played a key economic role in the country by providing this service. In turn the Plantagenets took advantage of the Jews' status as direct subjects, heavily taxing them at will without the necessity to summon Parliament. Edward's first major step towards Jewish expulsion was the Statute of the Jewry, which outlawed all usury and gave Jews fifteen years to buy agricultural land. However, popular prejudice made Jewish movement into mercantile or agricultural pursuits impossible. Edward attempted to clear his debts with the expulsion of Jews from Gascony, seizing their property and transferred all outstanding debts payable to himself. He made his continued tax demands more palatable to his subjects by offering to expel all Jews in exchange. The heavy tax was passed and the Edict of Expulsion was issued. This proved widely popular and was quickly carried out.

===== Anglo-Scottish wars =====
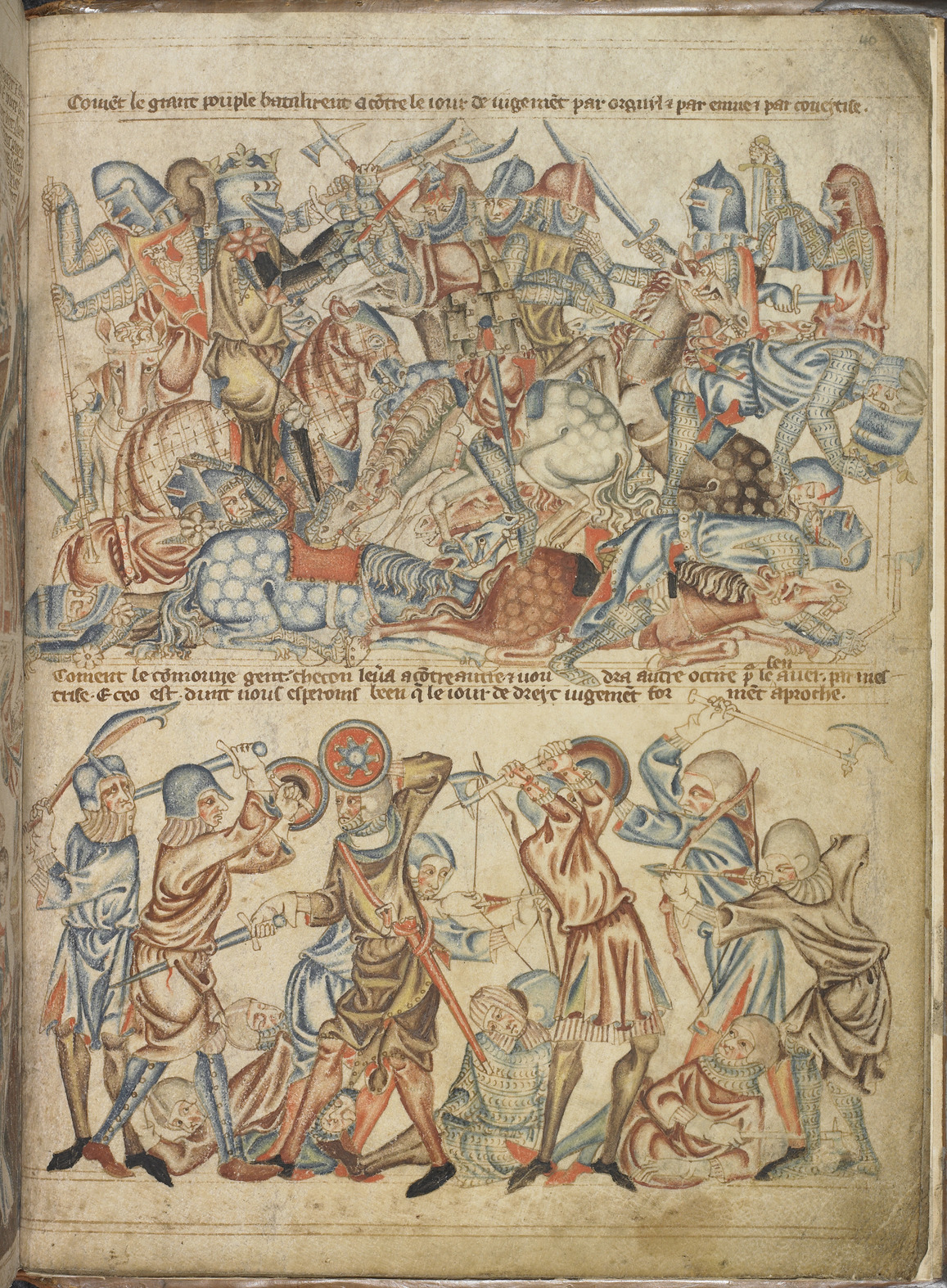
Scene from the Holkham Bible, shows knights and foot soldiers from the period of Bannockburn

Edward asserted that the king of Scotland owed him feudal allegiance, which embittered Anglo-Scottish relations for the rest of his reign. Edward intended to create a dual monarchy by marrying his son Edward to Margaret, Maid of Norway, who was the sole heir of Alexander III of Scotland. When Margaret died there was no obvious heir to the Scottish throne. Edward was invited by the Scottish magnates to resolve the dispute. Edward obtained recognition from the competitors for the Scottish throne that he had the 'sovereign lordship of Scotland and the right to determine our several pretensions'. He decided the case in favour of John Balliol, who duly swore loyalty to him and became king. Edward insisted that Scotland was not independent and that as sovereign lord he had the right to hear in England appeals against Balliol's judgements, undermining Balliol's authority. At the urging of his chief councillors, John entered into an alliance with France in 1295. In 1296 Edward invaded Scotland, deposing and exiling Balliol.

Edward was less successful in Gascony, which was overrun by the French. His commitments were beginning to outweigh his resources. Chronic debts had been incurred by wars against Flanders and Gascony in France, and Wales and Scotland in Britain. The clergy refused to pay their share of the costs, with the Archbishop of Canterbury threatening excommunication; Parliament was reluctant to contribute to Edward's expensive and unsuccessful military policies. Humphrey de Bohun, 3rd Earl of Hereford and Roger Bigod, 5th Earl of Norfolk, refused to serve in Gascony, and the barons presented a formal statement of their grievances. Edward was forced to reconfirm the charters (including Magna Carta) to obtain the money he required. A truce and peace treaty with the French king restored the duchy of Gascony to Edward. Meanwhile, William Wallace had risen in Balliol's name and recovered most of Scotland, before being defeated at the Battle of Falkirk. Edward summoned a full Parliament, including elected Scottish representatives for the settlement of Scotland. The new government in Scotland featured Robert the Bruce, but he rebelled and was crowned king of Scotland. Despite failing health, Edward was carried north to pursue another campaign, but he died en route at Burgh by Sands. Even though Edward had requested that his bones should be carried on Scottish campaigns and that his heart be taken to the Holy Land, he was buried at Westminster Abbey in a plain black marble tomb that in later years was painted with the words Scottorum malleus (Hammer of the Scots) and Pactum serva (Honour the vow). He was succeeded by his son as Edward II.

==== Edward II (1307–27) ====
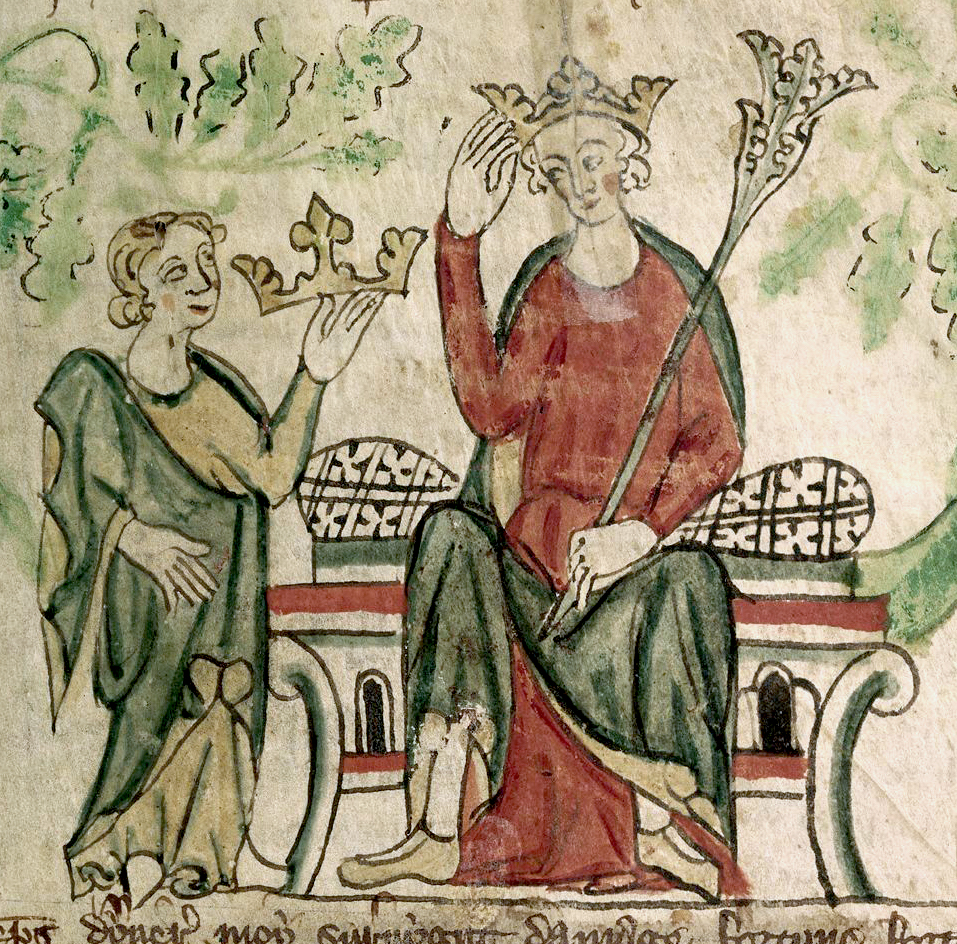
Edward II shown receiving the English crown in a contemporary illustration

Edward II's coronation oath on his succession in 1307 was the first to reflect the king's responsibility to maintain the laws that the community "shall have chosen" ("aura eslu"). The king was initially popular but faced three challenges: discontent over the financing of wars; his household spending and the role of his favourite Piers Gaveston. When Parliament decided that Gaveston should be exiled the king had no choice but to comply. The king engineered Gaveston's return, but was forced to agree to the appointment of Ordainers, led by his cousin Thomas, 2nd Earl of Lancaster, to reform the royal household with Piers Gaveston exiled again.

===== Great Famine =====
In the spring of 1315 unusually heavy rain began in much of Europe. Throughout the spring and summer, it continued to rain and the temperature remained cool. These conditions caused widespread crop failures. The straw and hay for the animals could not be cured and there was no fodder for livestock. The price of food began to rise, doubling in England between spring and midsummer. Salt, the only way to cure and preserve meat, was difficult to obtain because it could not be extracted through evaporation in the wet weather; it peaked in price in the period 1310–20, reaching double the price from the decade before. In the spring of 1316 it continued to rain on a European population deprived of energy and reserves to sustain itself. All segments of society from nobles to peasants were affected, but especially the peasants who were the overwhelming majority of the population and who had no reserve food supplies. The height of the famine was reached in 1317 as the wet weather continued. Finally, in the summer the weather returned to its normal patterns. By now, however, people were so weakened by diseases such as pneumonia, bronchitis, and tuberculosis, and so much of the seed stock had been eaten, that it was not until 1325 that the food supply returned to relatively normal conditions and the population began to increase again.

===== Late reign and deposition =====
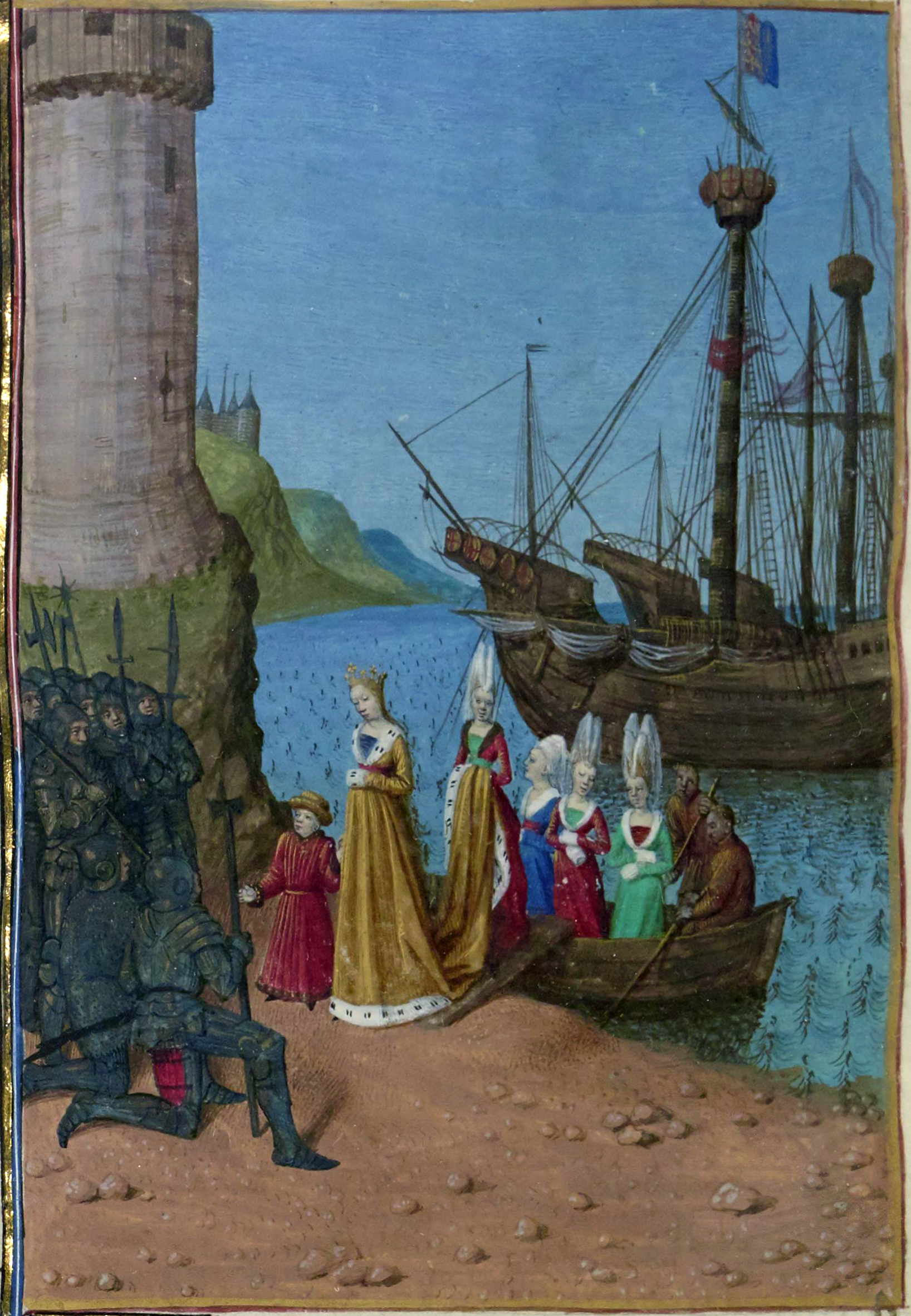
Queen Isabella landing in England with her son, the future Edward III in 1326

The Ordinances were published widely to obtain maximum popular support but there was a struggle over their repeal or continuation for a decade. When Gaveston returned again to England, he was abducted and executed after a mock trial. This brutal act drove Thomas, 2nd Earl of Lancaster, and his adherents from power. Edward's humiliating defeat at the Battle of Bannockburn in 1314 confirmed Bruce's position as an independent king of Scots. In England it returned the initiative to Lancaster and Guy de Beauchamp, 10th Earl of Warwick, who had not taken part in the campaign, claiming that it was in defiance of the Ordinances. Edward finally repealed the Ordinances after defeating Lancaster at the Battle of Boroughbridge and then executing him in 1322.

The War of Saint-Sardos, a short conflict between Edward and the Kingdom of France, led indirectly to Edward's overthrow. The French monarchy used the jurisdiction of the Parlement of Paris to overrule decisions of the nobility's courts. As a French vassal, Edward felt this encroachment in Gascony with the French kings adjudicating disputes between him and his French subjects. Without confrontation he could do little but watch the duchy shrink. Edmund of Woodstock, 1st Earl of Kent, decided to resist one such judgement in Saint-Sardos with the result that Charles IV declared the duchy forfeit. Charles's sister, Queen Isabella, was sent to negotiate and agreed to a treaty that required Edward to pay homage in France to Charles. Edward resigned Aquitaine and Ponthieu to his son, Prince Edward, who travelled to France to give homage in his stead. With the English heir in her power, Isabella refused to return to England unless Edward II dismissed his favourites and also formed a relationship with Roger Mortimer, 1st Earl of March. The couple invaded England and, joined by Henry, 3rd Earl of Lancaster, captured the king. Edward II abdicated on the condition that his son would inherit the throne rather than Mortimer. He is generally believed to have been murdered at Berkeley Castle by having a red-hot poker thrust into his bowels. In 1330 a coup by Edward III ended four years of control by Isabella and Mortimer. Mortimer was executed, but although removed from power, Isabella was treated well, living in luxury for the next 27 years.

==== Edward III (1327–77) ====
===== Renewal of the Scottish War =====
After the defeat of the English under the Mortimer regime by the Scots at Battle of Stanhope Park, the Treaty of Edinburgh–Northampton was signed in Edward III's name in 1328. Edward was not content with the peace agreement, but the renewal of the war with Scotland originated in private, rather than royal initiative. A group of English magnates known as The Disinherited, who had lost land in Scotland by the peace accord, staged an invasion of Scotland and won a victory at the Battle of Dupplin Moor in 1332. They attempted to install Edward Balliol as king of Scotland in David II's place, but Balliol was soon expelled and was forced to seek the help of Edward III. The English king responded by laying siege to the important border town of Berwick and defeated a large relieving army at the Battle of Halidon Hill. Edward reinstated Balliol on the throne and received a substantial amount of land in southern Scotland. These victories proved hard to sustain, however, as forces loyal to David II gradually regained control of the country. In 1338, Edward was forced to agree to a truce with the Scots.

===== Hundred Years' War =====
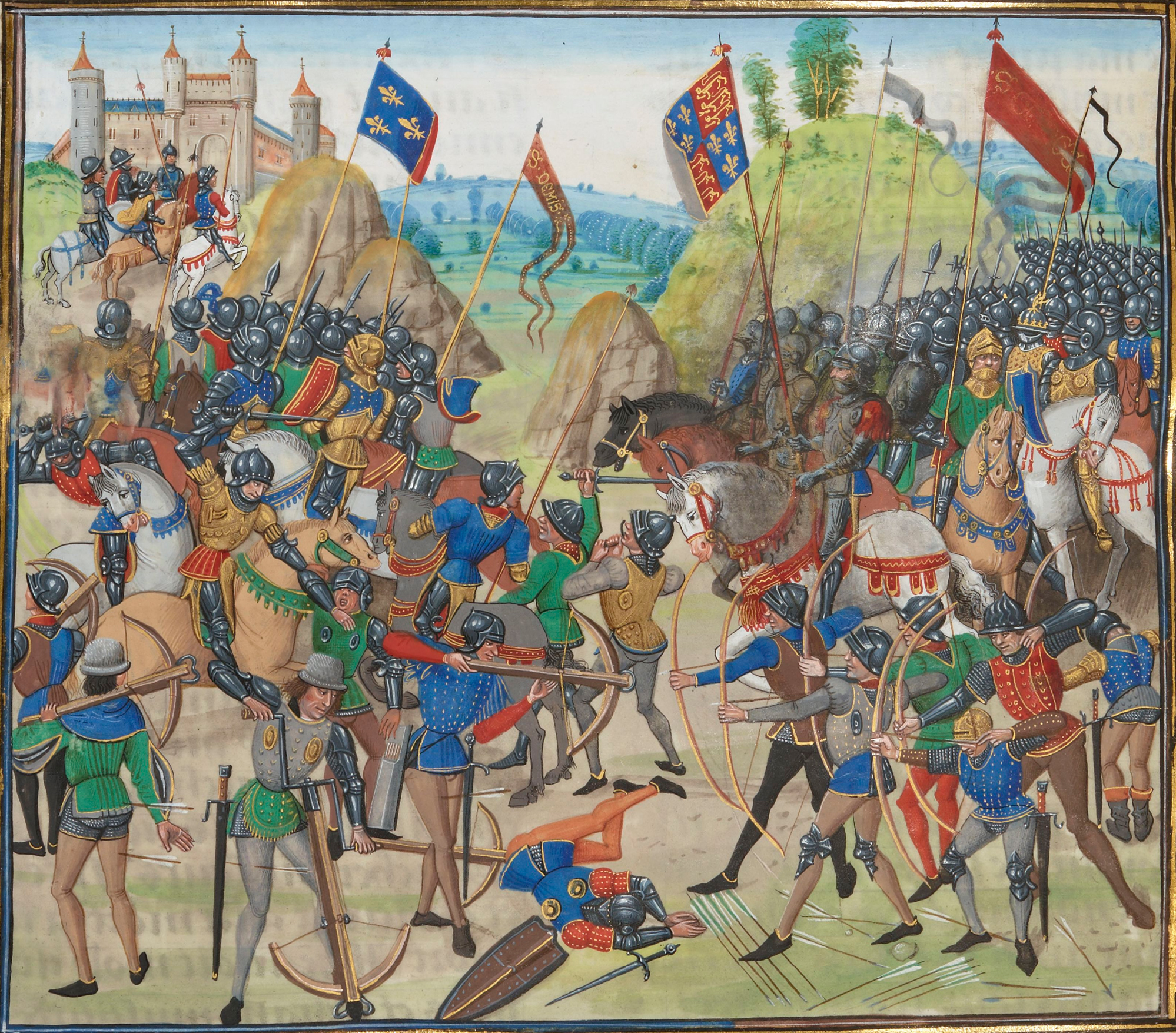
The victory at Crécy was an important success for the English crown in the Edwardian War in France.

In 1328 Charles IV of France died without a male heir. His cousin Phillip of Valois and Queen Isabella, on behalf of her son Edward, were the major claimants to the throne. Philip, as senior grandson of Philip III of France in the male line, became king over Edward's claim as a matrilineal grandson of Philip IV of France, following the precedents of Philip V's succession over his niece Joan II of Navarre and Charles IV's succession over his nieces. Not yet in power, Edward III paid homage to Phillip as Duke of Aquitaine and the French king continued to assert feudal pressure on Gascony. Philip demanded that Edward extradite an exiled French adviser, Robert III of Artois, and, when he refused, declared Edward's lands in Gascony and Ponthieu forfeit. In response Edward put together a coalition of continental supporters, promising payment of over £200,000. Edward borrowed heavily from the banking houses of the Bardi and Peruzzi, merchants in the Low Countries, and William de la Pole, a wealthy merchant who came to the king's rescue by advancing him £110,000. Edward also asked Parliament for a grant of £300,000 in return for further concessions.

The delay caused by fundraising allowed the French to invade Gascony, and threaten the English ports while the English conducted widespread piracy in the Channel. Edward proclaimed himself king of France to encourage the Flemish to rise in open rebellion against the French king and won a significant naval victory at the Battle of Sluys, where the French fleet was almost completely destroyed. Inconclusive fighting continued at the Battle of Saint-Omer and the Siege of Tournai (1340), but with both sides running out of money, the fighting ended with the Truce of Espléchin. Edward III had achieved nothing of military value and English political opinion was against him. Bankrupt, he cut his losses, ruining many whom he could not, or chose not, to repay.

Both countries suffered from war exhaustion. The tax burden had been heavy and the wool trade had been disrupted. Edward spent the following years paying off his immense debt, while the Gascons merged the war with banditry. In 1346 Edward invaded from the Low Countries using the strategy of chevauchée, a large extended raid for plunder and destruction that would be deployed by the English throughout the war. The chevauchée discredited Philip VI of France's government and threatened to detach his vassals from loyalty. Edward fought two successful actions, the Storming of Caen and the Battle of Blanchetaque. He then found himself outmanoeuvred and outnumbered by Philip and was forced to fight at Crécy. The battle was a crushing defeat for the French, leaving Edward free to capture the important port of Calais. A subsequent victory against Scotland at the Battle of Neville's Cross resulted in the capture of David II and reduced the threat from Scotland.

===== Black Death =====
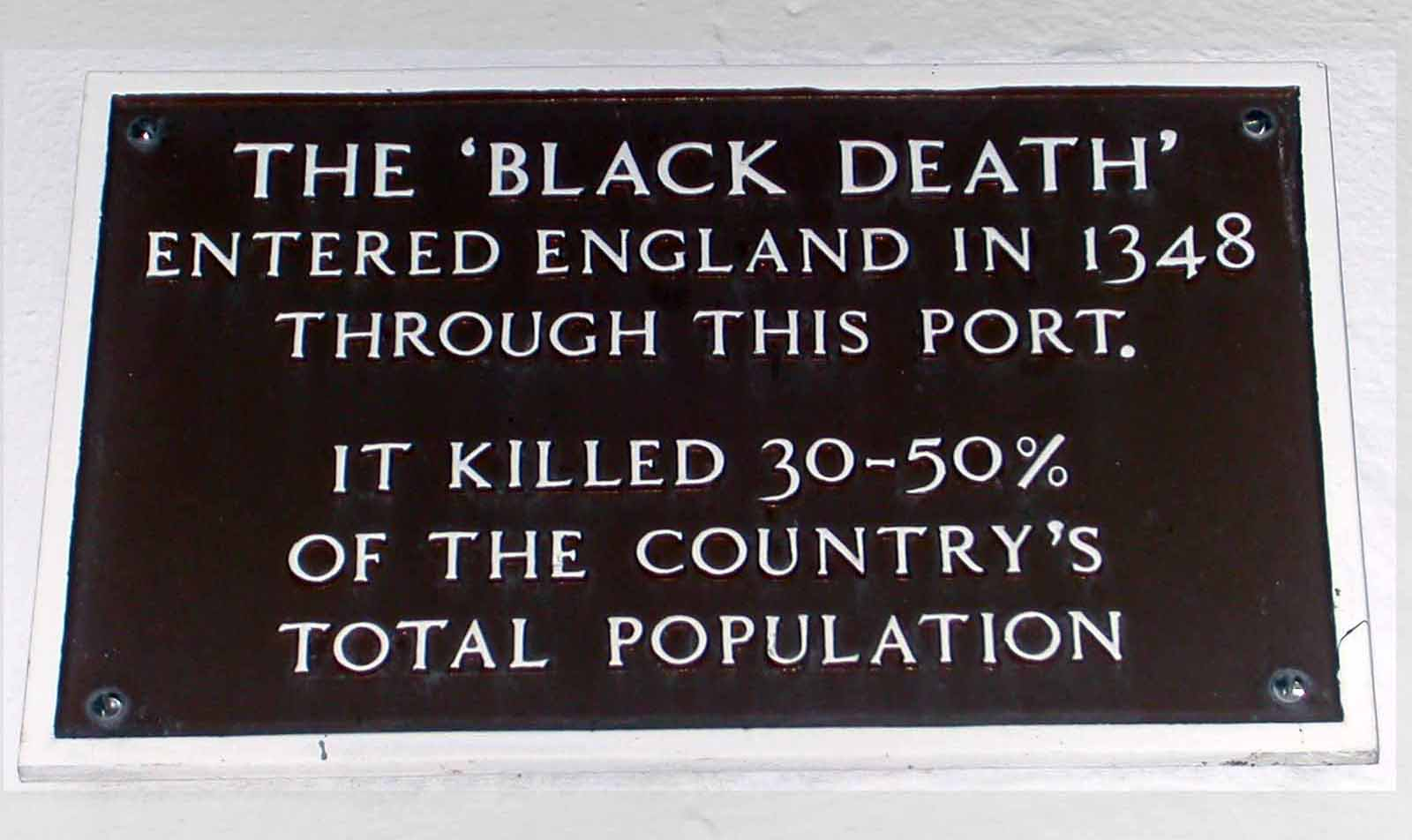
Plaque in Weymouth, noting the entrance of plague into the country

According to the chronicle of the grey friars at King's Lynn, the plague arrived by ship from Gascony to Melcombe in Dorset – today normally referred to as Weymouth – shortly before "the Feast of St. John The Baptist" on 24 June 1348. From Weymouth the disease spread rapidly across the south-west. The first major city to be struck was Bristol. London was reached in the autumn of 1348, before most of the surrounding countryside. This had certainly happened by November, though according to some accounts as early as 29 September. The full effect of the plague was felt in the capital early the next year. Conditions in London were ideal for the plague: the streets were narrow and flowing with sewage, and houses were overcrowded and poorly ventilated. By March 1349 the disease was spreading in a haphazard way across all of southern England. During the first half of 1349 the Black Death spread northwards. A second front opened up when the plague arrived by ship at the Humber, from where it spread both south and north. In May it reached York, and during the summer months of June, July and August, it ravaged the north. Certain northern counties, like Durham and Cumberland, had been the victim of violent incursions from the Scots, and were therefore left particularly vulnerable to the devastations of the plague. Pestilence is less virulent during the winter months, and spreads less rapidly. The Black Death in England had survived the winter of 1348–49, but during the following winter it ended, and by December 1349 conditions were returning to relative normalcy. It had taken the disease approximately 500 days to traverse the entire country. The Black Death brought a halt to Edward's campaigns by killing between a third to more than half of his subjects. The king passed the Ordinance of Labourers and the Statute of Labourers in response to the shortage of labour and social unrest that followed the plague. The labour laws were ineffectively enforced and the repressive measures caused resentment.

===== Poitiers campaign and expansion of the conflict (1356–68) =====
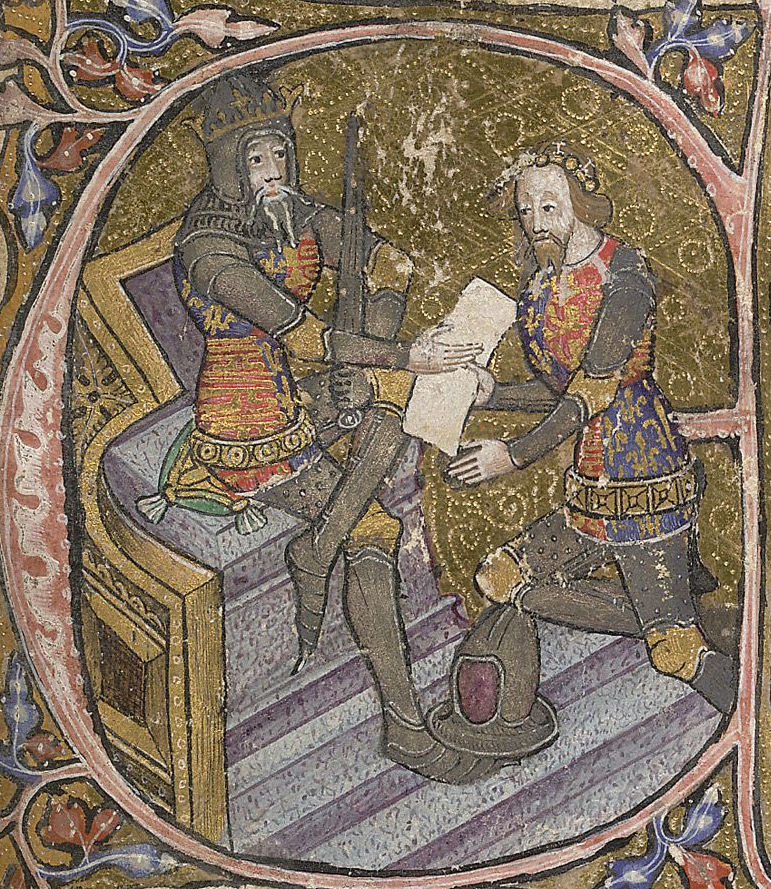
Edward, the Black Prince is granted Aquitaine by his father King Edward III. Initial letter "E" of miniature, 1390; British Library, shelfmark: Cotton MS Nero D VI, f.31

In 1356 Edward, Prince of Wales, resumed the war with one of the most destructive chevauchées of the conflict. Starting from Bordeaux he laid waste to the lands of Armagnac before turning eastward into Languedoc. Toulouse prepared for a siege, but the Prince's army was not equipped for one, so he bypassed the city and continued south, pillaging and burning. Unlike large cities such as Toulouse, the rural French villages were not organised to provide a defence, making them much more attractive targets. In a second great chevauchée the Prince burned the suburbs of Bourges without capturing the city, before marching west along the Loire River to Poitiers, where the Battle of Poitiers resulted in a decisive English victory and the capture of John II of France. The Second Treaty of London was signed, which promised a four million écus ransom. It was guaranteed by the Valois family hostages being held in London, while John returned to France to raise his ransom. Edward gained possession of Normandy, Brittany, Anjou, Maine and the coastline from Flanders to Spain, restoring the lands of the former Angevin Empire. The hostages quickly escaped back to France. John, horrified that his word had been broken, returned to England and died there. Edward invaded France in an attempt to take advantage of the popular rebellion of the Jacquerie, hoping to seize the throne. Although no French army stood against him, he was unable to take Paris or Rheims. In the subsequent Treaty of Brétigny he renounced his claim to the French crown, but greatly expanded his territory in Aquitaine and confirmed his conquest of Calais.

Fighting in the Hundred Years' War often spilled from the French and Plantagenet lands into surrounding realms. This included the dynastic conflict in Castile between Peter of Castile and Henry II of Castile. Edward, Prince of Wales, allied himself with Peter, defeating Henry at the Battle of Nájera before falling out with Peter, who had no means to reimburse him, leaving Edward bankrupt. The Plantagenets continued to interfere and John of Gaunt, 1st Duke of Lancaster, the prince's brother, married Peter's daughter Constance, claiming the Crown of Castile in the name of his wife. He arrived with an army, asking John I to give up the throne in favour of Constance. John declined; instead his son married John of Gaunt's daughter, Catherine of Lancaster, creating the title Prince of Asturias for the couple.

===== French resurgence (1369–77) =====
Charles V of France resumed hostilities when Prince Edward refused a summons as Duke of Aquitaine and his reign saw the Plantagenets steadily pushed back in France. Prince Edward went on to demonstrate the brutal character that some think is the cause of his name of the "Black Prince" at the Siege of Limoges. After the town had opened its gates to John, Duke of Berry, he directed the massacre of 3,000 inhabitants, men, women and children. Following this the prince was too ill to contribute to the war or government and returned to England, where he soon died: the son of a king and the father of a king, but never a king himself.

Prince Edward's brother John of Gaunt, 1st Duke of Lancaster assumed leadership of the English in France. Despite further chevauchées, destroying the countryside and the productivity of the land, his efforts were strategically ineffective. The French commander, Bertrand Du Guesclin adopted Fabian tactics in avoiding major English field forces while capturing towns, including Poitiers and Bergerac. In a further strategic blow, English dominance at sea was reversed by the disastrous defeat at the Battle of La Rochelle, undermining English seaborne trade and allowing Gascony to be threatened.

==== Richard II (1377–99) ====
===== Peasants' Revolt =====
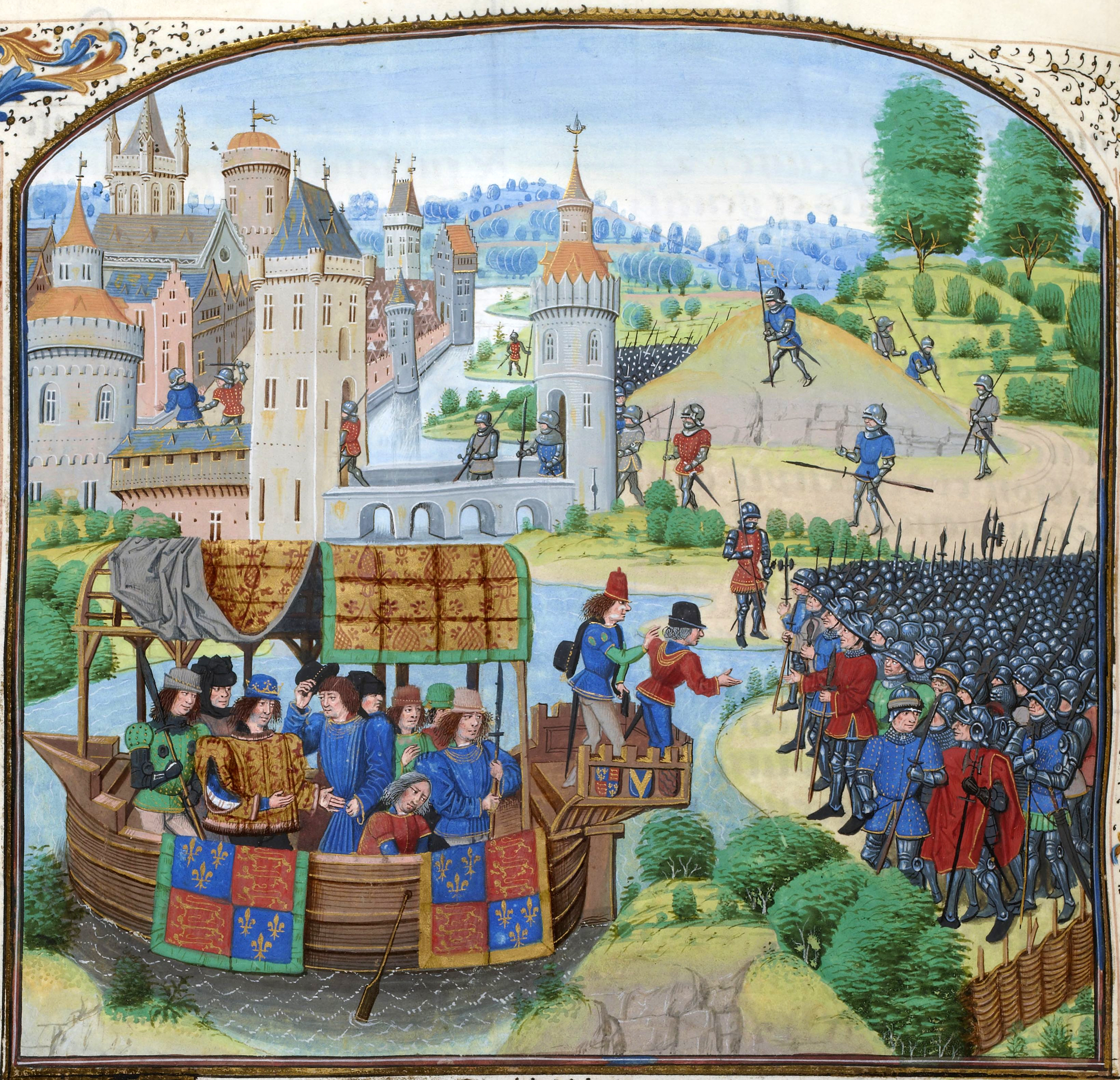
Richard II meets the rebels of the Peasants' Revolt in a painting from Froissart's Chronicles.

The 10-year-old Richard II succeeded on the deaths of his father and grandfather, with government in the hands of a regency council until he came of age. The poor state of the economy caused significant civil unrest as his government levied a number of poll taxes to finance military campaigns. The tax of one shilling for everyone over the age of 15 proved particularly unpopular. This, combined with enforcement of the Statute of Labourers, which curbed employment standards and wages, triggered an uprising with a refusal to pay the tax in 1381. Kent rebels, led by Wat Tyler, marched on London. Initially, there were only attacks on certain properties, many of them associated with John of Gaunt. The rebels are reputed to have been met by the young king himself and presented him with a series of demands, including the dismissal of some of his ministers and the abolition of serfdom. Rebels stormed the Tower of London and executed those hiding there. At Smithfield further negotiations were arranged, but Tyler behaved belligerently and in the ensuing dispute William Walworth, the Lord Mayor of London, attacked and killed Tyler. Richard seized the initiative shouting "You shall have no captain but me", a statement left deliberately ambiguous to defuse the situation. He had promised clemency, but on re-establishing control he pursued, captured and executed the other leaders of the rebellion and all concessions were revoked.

===== Deposition =====
A group of magnates consisting of the king's uncle Thomas of Woodstock, 1st Duke of Gloucester, Richard FitzAlan, 11th Earl of Arundel, and Thomas de Beauchamp, 12th Earl of Warwick, became known as the Lords Appellant when they sought to impeach five of the king's favourites and restrain what was increasingly seen as tyrannical and capricious rule. Later they were joined by Henry Bolingbroke, the son and heir of John of Gaunt, and Thomas de Mowbray, 1st Duke of Norfolk. Initially, they were successful in establishing a commission to govern England for one year, but they were forced to rebel against Richard, defeating an army under Robert de Vere, Earl of Oxford, at the skirmish of Radcot Bridge. Richard was reduced to a figurehead with little power. As a result of the Merciless Parliament, de Vere and Michael de la Pole, 1st Earl of Suffolk, who had fled abroad, were sentenced to death in their absence. Alexander Neville, Archbishop of York, had all of his worldly goods confiscated. A number of Richard's council were executed. Following John of Gaunt's return from Spain, Richard was able to rebuild his power, having Gloucester murdered in captivity in Calais. Warwick was stripped of his title. Bolingbroke and Mowbray were exiled. When John of Gaunt died in 1399, Richard disinherited Henry of Bolingbroke, who invaded England in response with a small force that quickly grew in numbers. Meeting little resistance, Henry deposed Richard to have himself crowned Henry IV of England. Richard died in captivity early the next year, probably murdered, bringing an end to the main Plantagenet line.

=== House of Lancaster ===
==== Henry IV (1399–1413) ====
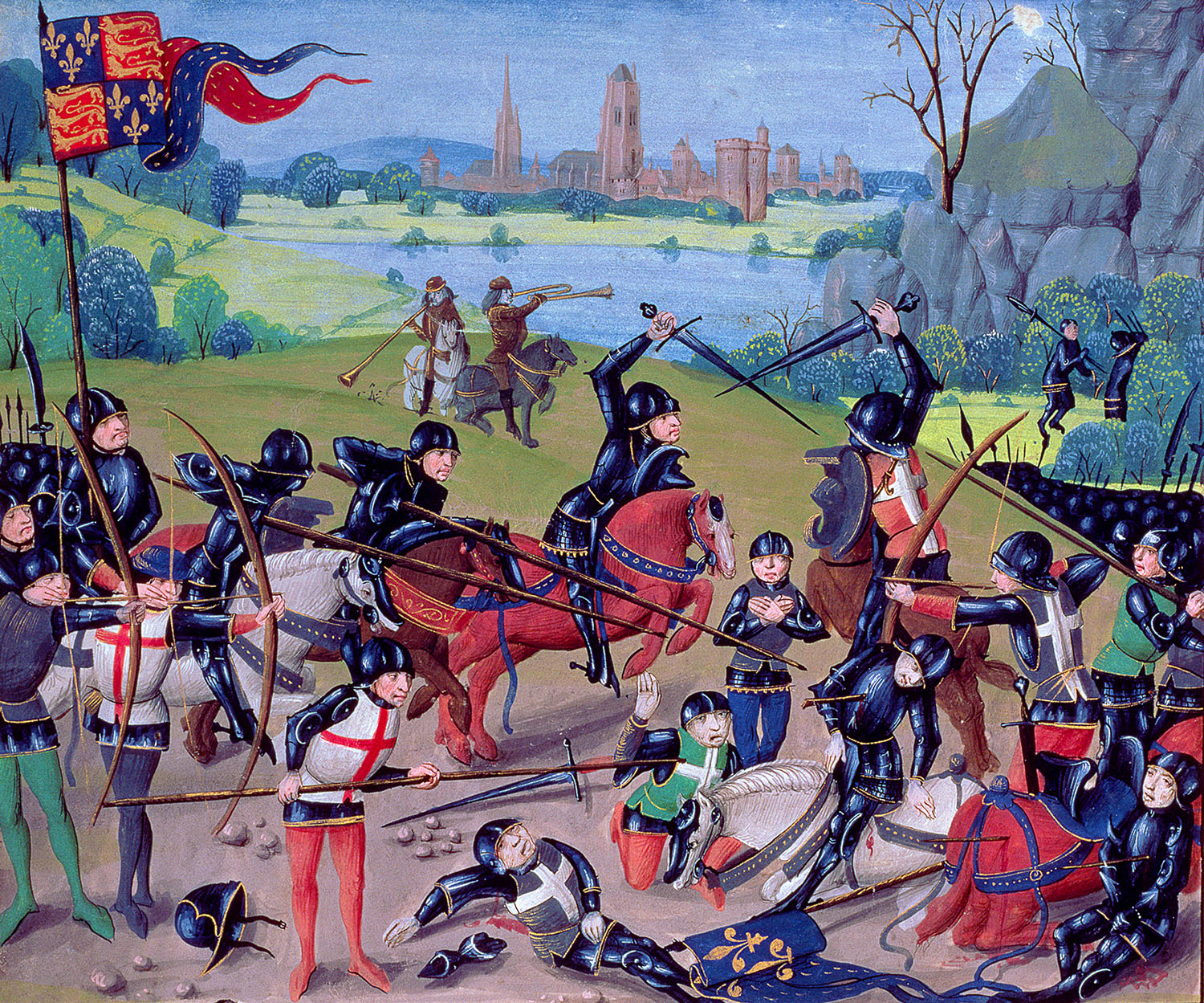
The Battle of Agincourt fought on Saint Crispin's Day 1415

Henry's claim to the throne was that his mother had legitimate rights through descent from Edmund Crouchback, who he claimed was the elder son of Henry III of England, set aside due to deformity, but these claims were not widely believed. Edmund Mortimer, Earl of March, was the heir presumptive to Richard II by being the grandson of Lionel of Antwerp, 1st Duke of Clarence. As a child he was not considered a serious contender. He never showed interest in the throne as an adult, instead serving the House of Lancaster loyally. When Richard of Conisburgh, 3rd Earl of Cambridge, later plotted to use him to displace Henry's newly crowned son, and their mutual cousin, Edmund informed the new king and the plotters were executed. However, the later marriage of his granddaughter to Richard's son consolidated his descendants' claim to the throne with that of the more junior House of York.

Henry resumed war with France, but was plagued with financial problems, declining health and frequent rebellions. A Scottish invasion was defeated at the Battle of Homildon Hill, but it resulted in a long war with Henry Percy, 1st Earl of Northumberland, for northern England, which was resolved only with the near complete destruction of the Percy family at the Battle of Bramham Moor. In Wales Owain Glyndŵr's widespread rebellion was only put down in 1408. Many saw it as a punishment from God when Henry was later struck down with leprosy and epilepsy.

==== Henry V (1413–21) ====
Hundred Years' War evolution. French territory: yellow; English: grey; Burgundian: dark grey.

Henry IV died in 1413. His son and successor, Henry V was a successful and ruthless martial leader. Aware that Charles VI of France's mental illness had caused instability in France, he invaded to assert the Plantagenet claims, captured Harfleur, made a chevauchée to Calais and won a near total victory over the French at the Battle of Agincourt on 25 October 1415, despite being outnumbered, outmanoeuvred and low on supplies. In subsequent years Henry recaptured much of Normandy and successfully secured marriage to Catherine of Valois. The resulting Treaty of Troyes stated that Henry's heirs would inherit the throne of France. However, conflict continued with the Dauphin, and Henry's brother Thomas, Duke of Clarence, was killed in the defeat at the Battle of Baugé in 1421. When Henry died in 1422, possibly with dysentery, he was succeeded by his nine-month-old son as Henry VI of England. The elderly Charles VI of France died two months later.

==== Henry VI (1421–71) ====
Led by Henry's brother John of Lancaster, 1st Duke of Bedford, there were several more English victories, such as the Battle of Verneuil, in 1424, but it was impossible to maintain campaigning at this level. Joan of Arc's involvement helped force the lifting of the siege of Orleans. French victory at the Battle of Patay enabled the Dauphin to be crowned at Reims and continue the successful Fabian tactics, avoiding full frontal assaults and exploiting logistical advantage. Joan was captured by the Burgundians, sold to the English, tried as a witch and burned at the stake.

During the minority of Henry VI the war caused political division amongst the legitimate and illegitimate Plantagenets. Bedford wanted to defend Normandy, Humphrey of Lancaster, 1st Duke of Gloucester, just Calais, but Cardinal Beaufort wanted peace. This division led to Humphrey's wife being accused of using witchcraft with the aim of putting him on the throne. Humphrey was later arrested and died in prison. The refusal to renounce the Plantagenet claim to the French crown at the congress of Arras enabled the former Plantagenet ally Philip III, Duke of Burgundy, to reconcile with Charles, while giving Charles time to reorganise his feudal levies into a modern professional army that would put its superior numbers to good use. The French retook Rouen and Bordeaux, regained Normandy, won the Battle of Formigny in 1450 and, with victory at the Battle of Castillon in 1453, brought an end to the war, leaving the English with only Calais and its surrounding Pale in continental France.

Henry VI was a weak king, and has been seen vulnerable to the over-mighty subjects created by the decline into bastard feudalism, who took advantage of the feudal levy being replaced by taxation to develop private armies of liveried retainers. The result was rivalries that often spilled over from the courtroom into armed confrontations such as Percy–Neville feud. The common interest given by the war in France had ended, so Richard, Duke of York, and Richard Neville, 16th Earl of Warwick, used their networks to defy the crown while the gentry attached themselves to different factions depending on their private feuds. Henry became the focus of discontent, as population, agricultural production, prices, wool trade and credit declined in the Great Slump. Most seriously, in 1450 Jack Cade raised a rebellion in an attempt to force the king to address economic problems or abdicate his throne. The uprising was suppressed, but the situation remained unsettled, with more radical demands coming from John and William Merfold.

==== Wars of the Roses ====
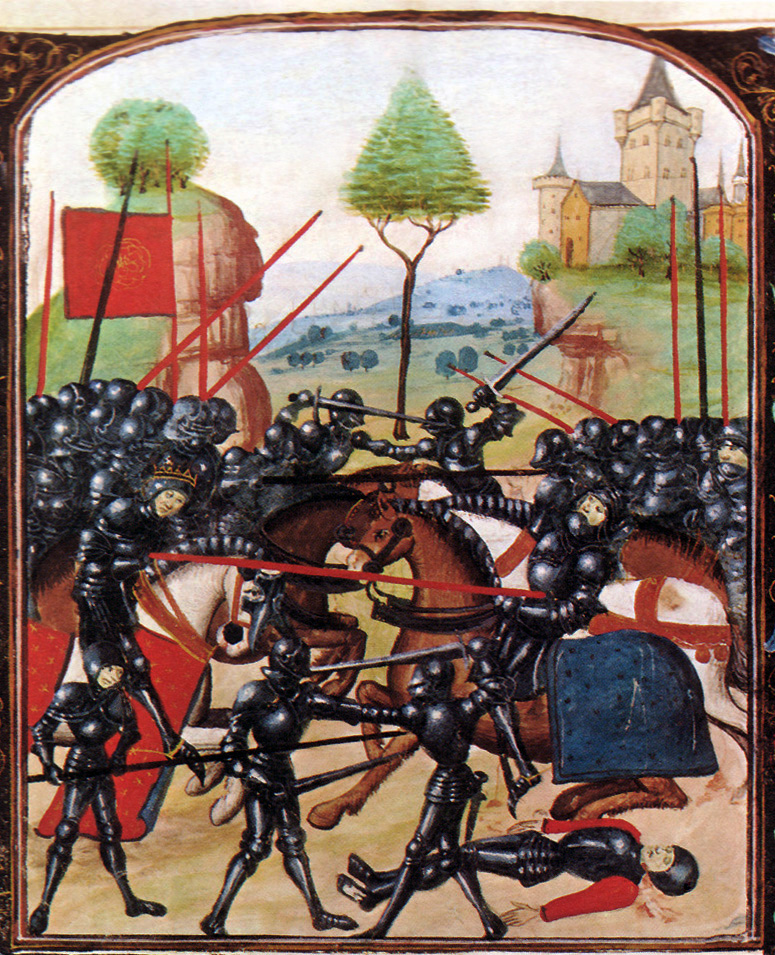
A near-contemporary Flemish picture of the Battle of Barnet in 1471

Richard Plantagenet, Duke of York's attitude to the marriage contract of Henry and Margaret of Anjou, which included the surrender of Maine and extended the truce with France, contributed to his appointment as Lord Lieutenant of Ireland. This conveniently removed him from English and French politics on which he had influence as a descendant of both Lionel, Duke of Clarence, and Edmund, Duke of York. Conscious of the fate of Duke Humphrey at the hands of the Beauforts, and suspicious that Henry intended to nominate Edmund Beaufort, 2nd Duke of Somerset, as heir presumptive in his stead, he recruited militarily on his return to England. Richard claimed to be a reformer but was possibly plotting against his enemy Somerset. Armed conflict was avoided, because Richard lacked aristocratic support and was forced to swear allegiance to Henry. However, when Henry had a mental breakdown, Richard was named regent. Henry himself was trusting and not a man of war, but Margaret was more assertive, showing open enmity toward Richard, particularly after the birth of a male heir that resolved the succession question.

When Henry's sanity returned, the court party reasserted its authority. Richard of York and the Nevilles, who were related by marriage and had been alienated by Henry's support of the Percys, defeated them at a skirmish called the First Battle of St Albans. Possibly as few as 50 men were killed, but among them were Somerset and the two Percy lords, Henry Percy, 2nd Earl of Northumberland, and Thomas Clifford, 8th Baron de Clifford, creating feuds that would prove impossible to reconcile; reputedly Clifford's son would later murder Richard's son Edmund. The ruling class was deeply shocked and reconciliation was attempted.

Threatened with treason charges and lacking support, York, Richard Neville, 5th Earl of Salisbury, and Richard Neville, 16th Earl of Warwick, fled abroad. The Nevilles returned to win the Battle of Northampton, where they captured Henry. When Richard joined them, he surprised Parliament by claiming the throne, then forcing through the Act of Accord, which stated that Henry would remain as monarch for his lifetime, but would be succeeded by York. Margaret found this disregarding of her son's claims unacceptable and so the conflict continued. York was killed at the Battle of Wakefield and his head set on display at Micklegate Bar, along with those of his son Edmund, Earl of Rutland, and Richard Neville, Earl of Salisbury, who had both been captured and beheaded.

=== House of York ===
==== Edward IV (1461–83) ====
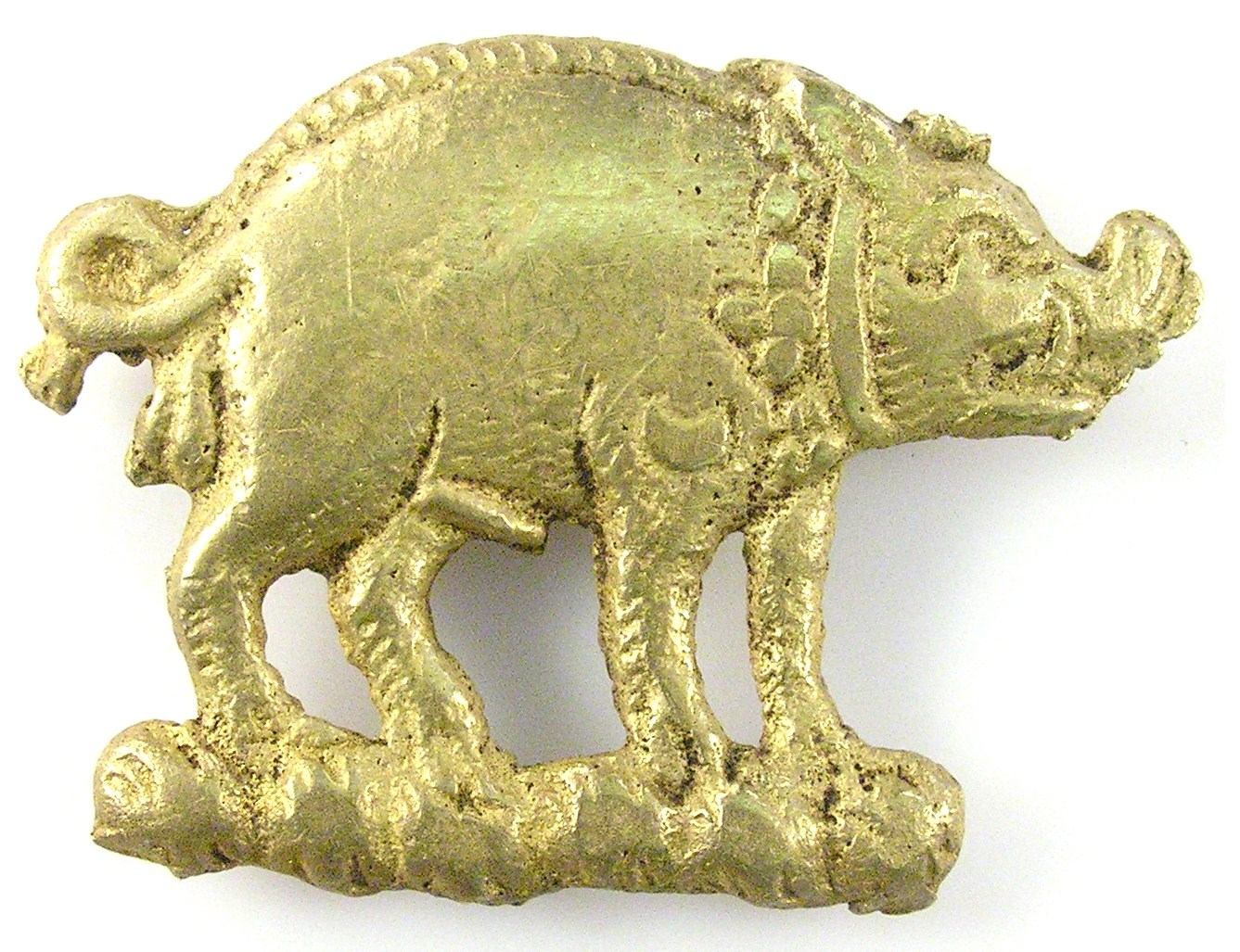
Bronze boar livery badge thought to have been worn by a supporter of Richard III, often described as the last Plantagenet king

The Scottish queen Mary of Guelders provided Margaret with support and a Scottish army pillaged into southern England. London resisted in the fear of being plundered, then enthusiastically welcomed York's son Edward, Earl of March, with Parliament confirming that Edward should be made king. Edward was crowned as Edward IV after consolidating his position with victory at the Battle of Towton.

Edward's preferment of the former Lancastrian-supporting Woodville family, following his marriage to Elizabeth Woodville, led to Warwick and Edward's brother George Duke of Clarence helping Margaret depose Edward and return Henry to the throne in 1470. Edward and his brother Richard, Duke of Gloucester, fled, but on their return the next year Clarence switched sides at the Battle of Barnet, leading to the death of the Neville brothers. The subsequent Battle of Tewkesbury brought the demise of the last of the male line of the Beauforts. The battlefield execution of Edward of Westminster, Prince of Wales, and later murder of Henry VI extinguished the House of Lancaster.

==== Edward V and Richard III (1483–85) ====
By the mid-1470s, the victorious House of York looked safely established, with seven living male princes, but it quickly brought about its own demise. Clarence plotted against his brother and was executed. Following Edward's premature death in 1483, his son Edward Prince of Wales became king, but Parliament declared him and his brother Richard, Duke of York illegitimate on the grounds of an alleged prior marriage to Lady Eleanor Talbot, leaving Edward's marriage invalid. Richard ascended the throne as Richard III and the fate of Edward's sons, the so called Princes in the Tower, remains a mystery. Richard's son predeceased him. In 1485 there was an invasion of foreign mercenaries led by Henry Tudor, who claimed the throne through his mother Margaret Beaufort. After Richard was killed at the Battle of Bosworth Field, Tudor assumed the throne as Henry VII, founding the Tudor dynasty and bringing the Plantagenet line of kings to an end.

== Government and society ==
=== Governance and social structures ===
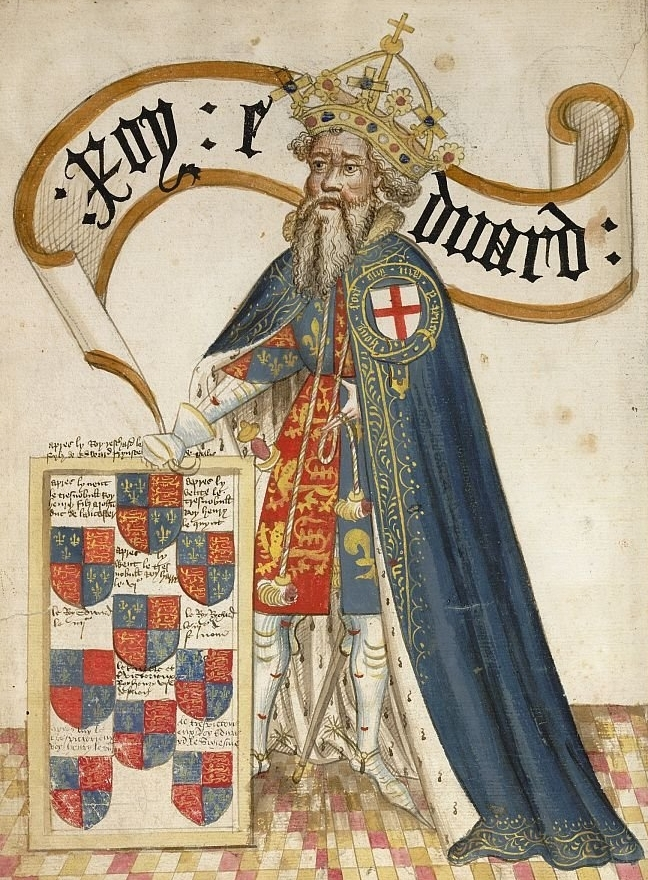
Early fifteenth-century depiction of Edward III, shown wearing the chivalric symbols of the Order of the Garter

On becoming king in 1272, Edward I reestablished royal power, overhauling the royal finances and appealing to the broader English elite by using Parliament to authorise the raising of new taxes and to hear petitions concerning abuses of local governance. This political balance collapsed under Edward II and savage civil wars broke out during the 1320s. Edward III restored order once more with the help of a majority of the nobility, exercising power through the exchequer, the common bench and the royal household. This government was better organised and on a larger scale than ever before, and by the fourteenth century the king's formerly peripatetic chancery had to take up permanent residence in Westminster. Edward used Parliament even more than his predecessors to handle general administration, to legislate and to raise the necessary taxes to pay for the wars in France. The royal lands—and incomes from them—had diminished over the years, and increasingly frequent taxation was required to support royal initiatives. Edward held elaborate chivalric events in an effort to unite his supporters around the symbols of knighthood. The ideal of chivalry continued to develop throughout the fourteenth century, reflected in the growth of knightly orders (including the Order of the Garter), grand tournaments and round table events.

By the time that Richard II was deposed in 1399, the power of the major noble magnates had grown considerably; powerful rulers such as Henry IV would contain them, but during the minority of Henry VI they controlled the country. The magnates depended upon their income from rent and trade to allow them to maintain groups of paid, armed retainers, often sporting controversial liveries, and to buy support amongst the wider gentry; this system has been dubbed bastard feudalism. (Note: The utility of the term bastard feudalism has been extensively discussed by historians, with many different conclusions being drawn.) Their influence was exerted both through the House of Lords at Parliament and through the king's council. The gentry and wealthier townsmen exercised increasing influence through the House of Commons, opposing raising taxes to pay for the French wars. In the 1430s and 1440s the English government was in major financial difficulties, leading to the crisis of 1450 and a popular revolt under the leadership of Jack Cade. Law and order deteriorated, and the crown was unable to intervene in the factional fighting between different nobles and their followers. The resulting Wars of the Roses saw a savage escalation of violence between the noble leaderships of both sides: captured enemies were executed and family lands attainted. By the time that Henry VII took the throne in 1485, England's governmental and social structures had been substantially weakened, with whole noble lines extinguished.

=== Women ===
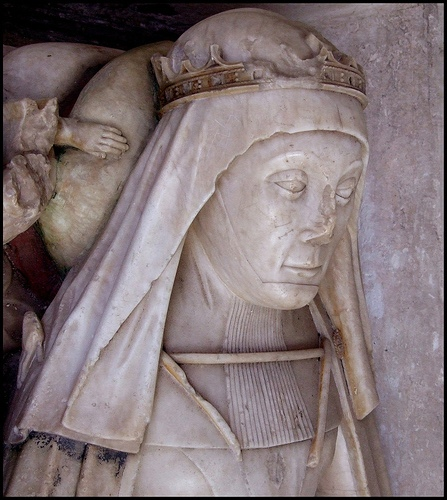
Tomb of Elizabeth of York, Duchess of Suffolk at Wingfield, Suffolk (built 1503)

Medieval England was a patriarchal society and the lives of women were heavily influenced by contemporary beliefs about gender and authority. However, the position of women varied considerably according to various factors, including their social class; whether they were unmarried, married, widowed or remarried; and in which part of the country they lived. Significant gender inequities persisted throughout the period, as women typically had more limited life-choices, access to employment and trade, and legal rights than men.

The growth of governmental institutions under a succession of bishops reduced the role of queens and their households in formal government. Married or widowed noblewomen remained significant cultural and religious patrons and played an important part in political and military events, even if chroniclers were uncertain if this was appropriate behaviour. As in earlier centuries, most women worked in agriculture, but here roles became more clearly gendered, with ploughing and managing the fields defined as men's work, for example, and dairy production becoming dominated by women.

The years after the Black Death left many women widows; in the wider economy labour was in short supply and land was suddenly readily available. In rural areas peasant women could enjoy a better standard of living than ever before, but the amount of work being done by women may have increased. Many other women travelled to the towns and cities, to the point where they outnumbered men in some settlements. There they worked with their husbands, or in a limited number of occupations, including spinning, making clothes, victualling and as servants. Some women became full-time ale brewers, until they were pushed out of business by the male-dominated beer industry in the fifteenth century. Higher status jobs and apprenticeships, however, remained closed to women. As in earlier times, noblewomen exercised power on their estates in their husbands' absence and again, if necessary, defended them in sieges and skirmishes. Wealthy widows who could successfully claim their rightful share of their late husband's property could live as powerful members of the community in their own right.

=== Identity ===
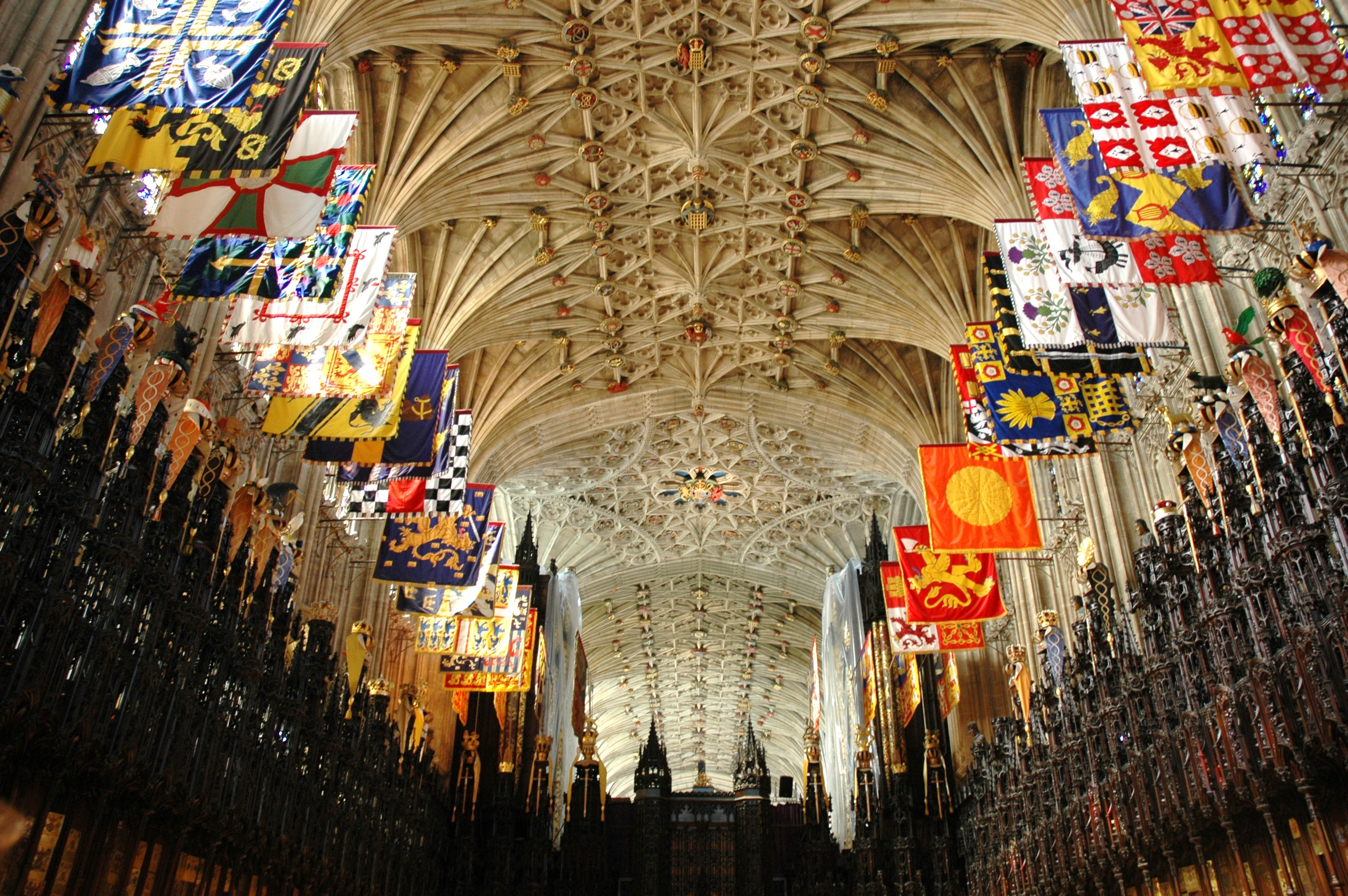
The English Gothic vaulted ceiling of St George's Chapel, Windsor Castle

During the twelfth and thirteenth centuries, the English began to consider themselves superior to the Welsh, Scots and Bretons. They perceived themselves as civilised, economically prosperous and properly Christian, while the Celtic fringe was considered lazy, barbarous and backward. Following the invasion of Ireland in the late twelfth century, similar feelings were expressed about the Irish, with the distinctions clarified and reinforced in fourteenth-century English legislation. The English also felt strongly about the foreign traders who lived in the special enclaves in London in the late Middle Ages; there was considerable hostility to Jews, resulting in their expulsion, but Italian and Baltic traders were also regarded as aliens and were frequently the targets of violence during economic downturns. Even within England, different identities abounded, each with its own sense of status and importance. Regional identities could be significant – men and women from Yorkshire, for example, had a clear identity within English society, and professional groups with a distinct identity, such as lawyers, engaged in open fighting with others in cities such as London.

English began to be used as a second language of the court during the reign of Edward I. Edward III encouraged the re-adoption of English as the official language of courts and parliament, with the Statute of Pleading establishing English as the language of royal and seignorial courts and it was officially adopted for diplomatic language in place of French in the reign of Henry IV. The Hundred Years War has been seen by a number of scholars as important in creating an English national identity, evidenced in its use of propaganda, the growth of cultural slurs and national stereotypes, intense intellectual debate between scholars of different kingdoms, cartographic evidence that indicated national boundaries, the role of the patron Saint George and of the Church in delivering a central message. It saw a change in the composition of armies, with the lower ranks identifying with a national cause and responding to a call to arms and the development of near permanent taxation that made the general population investors in a national enterprise. There was also the growth of chivalric orders like that of the Garter and the increasing central role of the monarchy and parliament in English life.

== Religion ==
=== Religious institutions ===
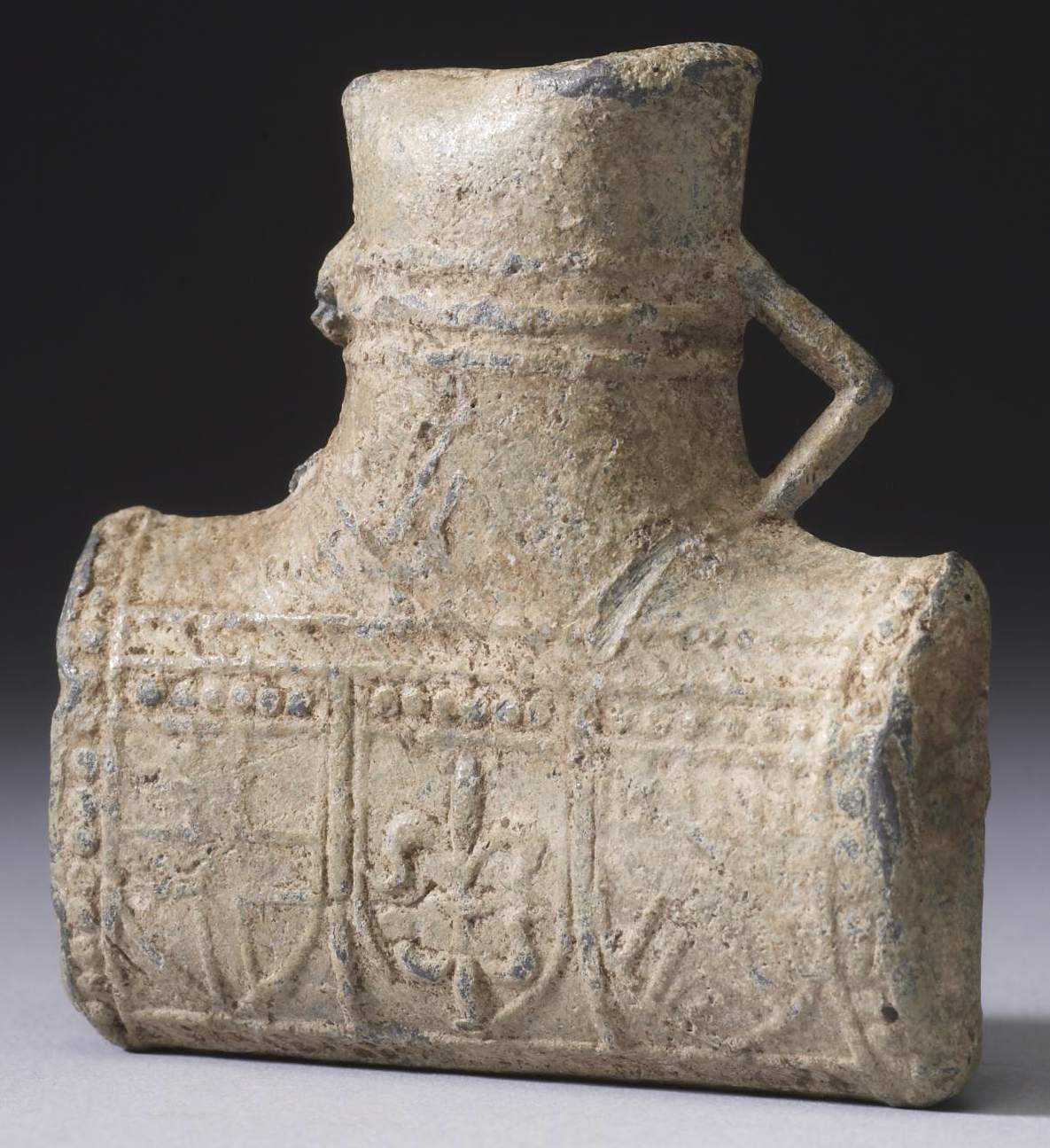
A pilgrim's flask, carried as a protective talisman, containing holy water from the shrine of Thomas Becket in Canterbury Cathedral

New religious orders began to be introduced into England in this period. The French Cluniac order became fashionable and their houses were introduced in England from the late eleventh century. The Augustinians spread quickly from the beginning of the twelfth century, while later in the century the Cistercians reached England, creating houses with a more austere interpretation of monastic rules and building the great abbeys of Rievaulx and Fountains. By 1215, there were over 600 monastic communities in England, but new endowments slowed during the thirteenth century, creating long-term financial problems for many institutions. Dominican and Franciscan friars arrived in England during the 1220s, establishing 150 friaries by the end of the thirteenth century; these mendicant orders rapidly became popular, particularly in towns, and heavily influenced local preaching. The religious military orders that became popular across Europe from the twelfth century acquired possessions in England, including the Templars, Teutonic Order and Hospitallers.

=== Pilgrimage ===
Pilgrimages were a popular religious practice throughout the Middle Ages in England. Typically pilgrims would travel short distances to a shrine or a particular church, either to do penance for a perceived sin, or to seek relief from an illness or other condition. Some pilgrims travelled further, either to more distant sites within Britain or, in a few cases, onto the continent. Major shrines in the late Middle Ages included those of Thomas Becket at Canterbury, Edward the Confessor, at Westminster Abbey, Hugh of Lincoln, William of York, Edmund Rich, Archbishop of Canterbury, who was buried at Pontigny Abbey in France, Richard of Chichester, Thomas Cantilupe of Hereford, St Osmund of Salisbury and John of Bridlington.

=== Heresy ===
In the 1380s several challenges emerged to the traditional teachings of the Church, resulting from the teachings of John Wycliffe, a member of Oxford University. Wycliffe argued that scripture was the best guide to understanding God's intentions, and that the superficial nature of the liturgy, combined with the abuses of wealth within the Church and the role of senior churchmen in government, distracted from that study. A loose movement that included many members of the gentry pursued these ideas after Wycliffe's death in 1384 and attempted to pass a Parliamentary bill in 1395: the movement was rapidly condemned by the authorities and was termed "Lollardy". The English bishops were charged with controlling and countering this trend, disrupting Lollard preachers and to enforcing the teaching of suitable sermons in local churches. By the early fifteenth century, combating Lollard teachings had become a key political issue, championed by Henry IV and his Lancastrian followers, who used the powers of both church and state to combat the heresy.

== Economy and technology ==
=== Geography ===
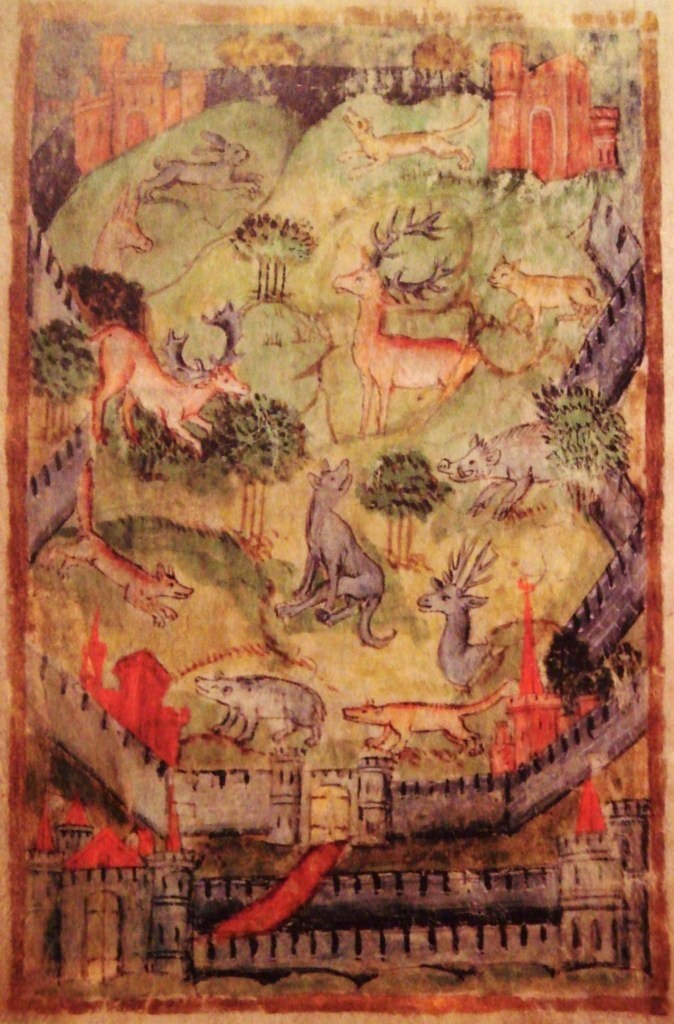
Fifteenth-century depiction of an English hunting park

England had a diverse geography in the medieval period, from the Fenlands of East Anglia and the heavily wooded Weald, through to the upland moors of Yorkshire. Despite this, medieval England broadly formed two zones, roughly divided by the rivers Exe and Tees: the south and east of England had lighter, richer soils, able to support both arable and pastoral agriculture, while the poorer soils and colder climate of the north and west produced a predominantly pastoral economy. Slightly more land was covered by trees than in the twentieth century, and bears, beavers and wolves lived wild in England, bears being hunted to extinction by the eleventh century and beavers by the twelfth. Of the 10,000 miles of roads that had been built by the Romans, many remained in use and four were of particular strategic importance—the Icknield Way, the Fosse Way, Ermine Street and Watling Street—which criss-crossed the entire country. The road system was adequate for the needs of the period, although it was significantly cheaper to transport goods by water. The major river networks formed key transport routes, while many English towns formed navigable inland ports.

For much of the Middle Ages, England's climate differed from that in the twenty-first century. Between the ninth and thirteenth centuries England went through the Medieval Warm Period, a prolonged era of milder temperatures; in the early thirteenth century, for example, summers were around 1 °C warmer than today and the climate was slightly drier. These warmer temperatures allowed poorer land to be brought into cultivation and for grapevines to be cultivated relatively far north. The Warm Period was followed by several centuries of much cooler temperatures, termed the Little Ice Age; by the fourteenth century spring temperatures had dropped considerably, reaching their coldest in the 1340s and 1350s. This cold end to the Middle Ages impacted significantly on English agriculture and living conditions. England's environment continued to be shaped throughout the period, through the building of dykes to drain marshes, tree clearance and the large scale extraction of peat. Managed parks for hunting game, including deer and boars, were built as status symbols by the nobility from the twelfth century.

=== Economy ===
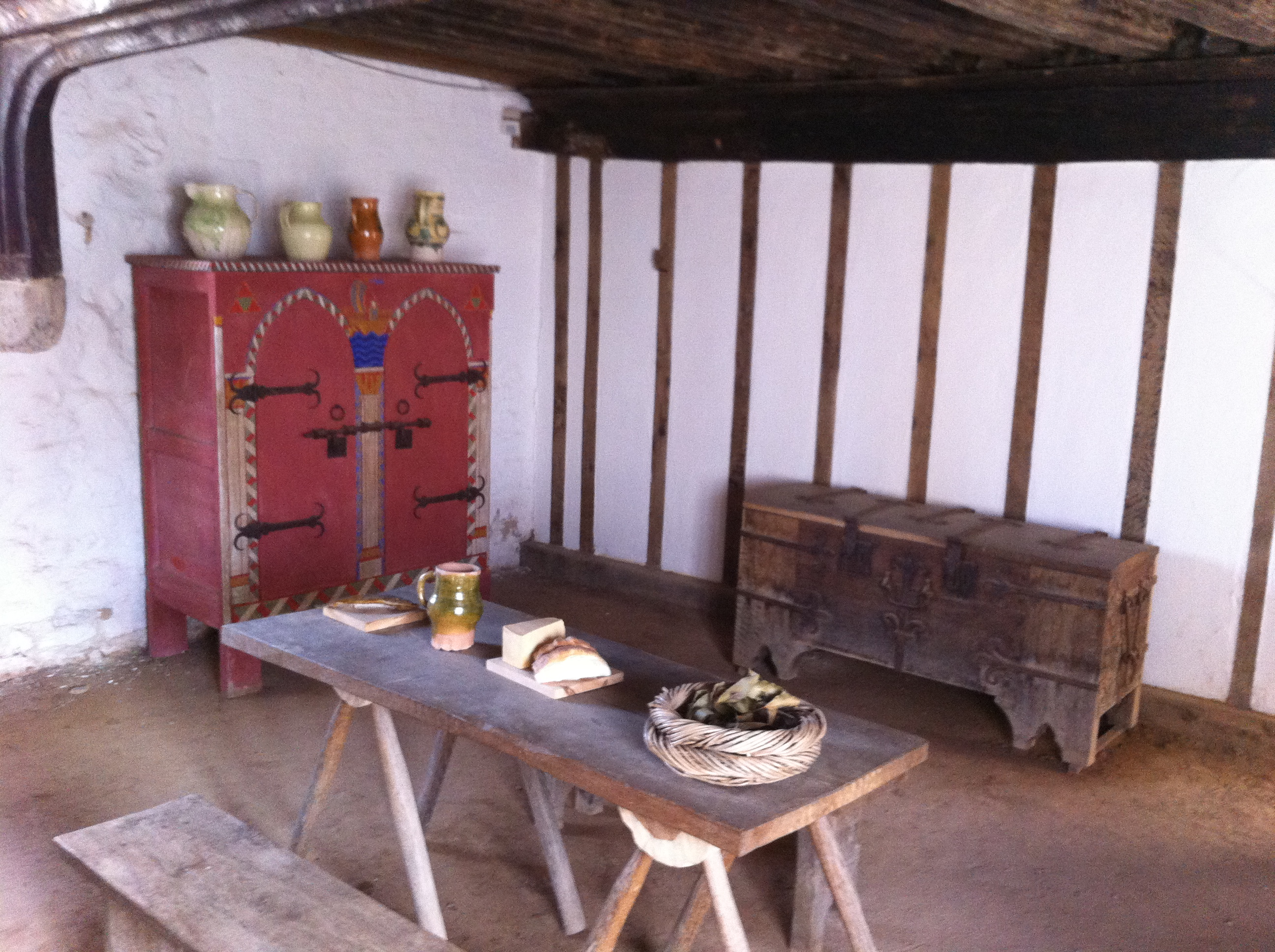
The central hall of a restored thirteenth-century house, originally built with the profits from European trade

The English economy was fundamentally agricultural, depending on growing crops such as wheat, barley and oats on an open field system, and husbanding sheep, cattle and pigs. Agricultural land was typically organised around manors, and was divided between some fields that the landowner would manage directly, called demesne land, and the majority of the fields that would be cultivated by local peasants. These peasants would pay rent to the landowner either through agricultural labour on the lord's demesne fields or through rent in the form of cash and produce. By the eleventh century a market economy was flourishing across much of England, while the eastern and southern towns were heavily involved in international trade. Around 6,000 watermills were built to grind flour, freeing up labour for other more productive agricultural tasks.

Economic growth began to falter at the end of the thirteenth century, owing to a combination of overpopulation, land shortages and depleted soils. The Great Famine shook the English economy severely and population growth ceased; the first outbreak of the Black Death in 1348 then killed around half the English population.

Rodney Hilton and other scholars have argued that those peasants who survived famine, plague and disease, found their situation to be much improved. The period 1350-1450 was for them a golden age of prosperity and new opportunities. Land was plentiful, wages high, and serfdom had all but disappeared. It was possible to move about and rise higher in life. Younger sons and women especially benefited. As population growth resumed, however, the peasants again faced deprivation and famine.

Conditions were less favourable for the great landowners. The agricultural sector shrank rapidly, with higher wages, lower prices and diminishing profits leading to the final demise of the old demesne system and the advent of the modern farming system centring on the charging of cash rents for lands. As returns on land fell, many estates, and in some cases entire settlements, were simply abandoned, and nearly 1,500 villages were deserted during this period. A new class of gentry emerged who rented farms from the major nobility. Attempts were made by the government to regulate wages and consumption, but these largely collapsed in the decades following the Peasants' Revolt of 1381.

The English cloth industry grew at the start of the fifteenth century, and a new class of international English merchants emerged, typically based in London or the South-West, prospering at the expense of the older, shrinking economies of the eastern towns. These new trading systems brought about the end of many of the international fairs and the rise of the chartered company. Fishing in the North Sea expanded into deeper waters, backed by commercial investment from major merchants. Between 1440 and 1480, however, Europe entered a recession and England suffered the Great Slump: trade collapsed, driving down agricultural prices, rents and ultimately the acceptable levels of royal taxation. The resulting tensions and discontent played an important part in Jack Cade's popular uprising in 1450 and the subsequent Wars of the Roses. By the end of Middle Ages the economy had begun to recover and considerable improvements were being made in metalworking and shipbuilding that would shape the early modern economy.

=== Technology and science ===
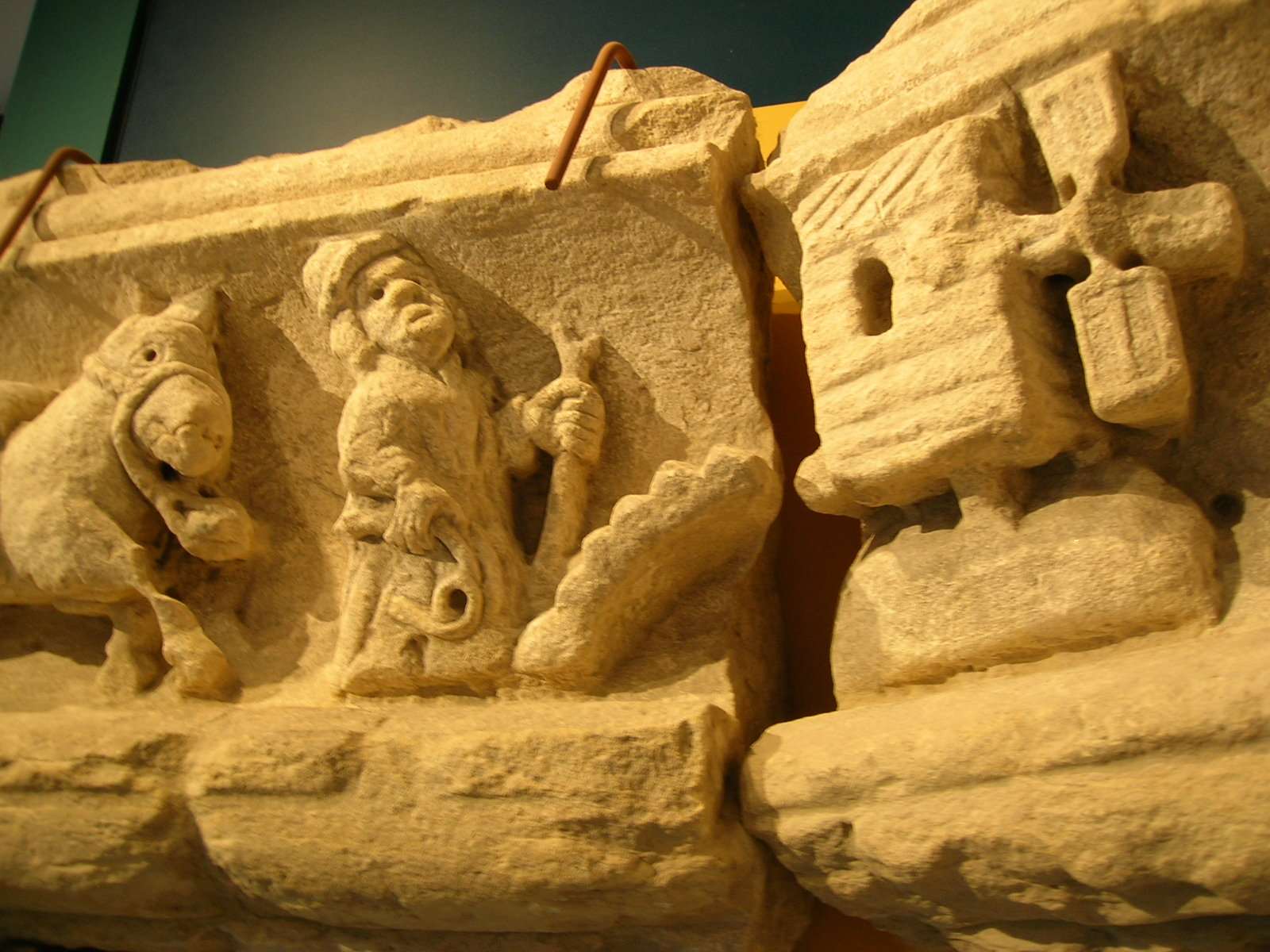
A medieval carving from Rievaulx Abbey showing one of the many new windmills established during the thirteenth century

Technology and science in England advanced considerably during the Middle Ages, driven in part by the Greek and Islamic thinking that reached England from the twelfth century. Many advances were made in scientific ideas, including the introduction of Arabic numerals and a sequence of improvements in the units used for measuring time. Clocks were first built in England in the late thirteenth century, and the first mechanical clocks were being installed in cathedrals and abbeys by the 1320s. Astrology, magic and palm reading were also considered important forms of knowledge in medieval England, although some doubted their reliability.

The period produced some influential English scholars. Roger Bacon (c. 1214–94), a philosopher and Franciscan friar, produced works on natural philosophy, astronomy and alchemy; his work set out the theoretical basis for future experimentation in the natural sciences. William of Ockham (c. 1287–1347) helped to fuse Latin, Greek and Islamic writing into a general theory of logic; "Ockham's Razor" was one of his oft-cited conclusions. Despite the limitations of medieval medicine, Gilbertus Anglicus published the Compendium Medicinae, one of the longest medical works ever written in Latin. Prominent historical and science texts began to be translated into English for the first time in the second half of the fourteenth century, including the Polychronicon and The Travels of Sir John Mandeville. The universities of Oxford and Cambridge were established during the eleventh and twelfth centuries, drawing on the model of the University of Paris.

Technological advances proceeded in a range of areas. Watermills to grind grain had existed during most of the Anglo-Saxon period, using horizontal mill designs; from the twelfth century on many more were built, eliminating the use of hand mills, with the older horizontal mills gradually supplanted by a new vertical mill design. Windmills began to be built in the late twelfth century and slowly became more common. Water-powered fulling mills and powered hammers first appeared in the twelfth century; water power was harnessed to assist in smelting by the fourteenth century, with the first blast furnace opening in 1496. New mining methods were developed and horse-powered pumps were installed in English mines by the end of the Middle Ages. The introduction of hopped beer transformed the brewing industry in the fourteenth century, and new techniques were invented to better preserve fish. Glazed pottery became widespread in the twelfth and thirteenth centuries, with stoneware pots largely replacing wooden plates and bowls by the fifteenth century. William Caxton and Wynkyn de Worde began using the printing press during the late fifteenth century. Transport links were also improved; many road bridges were either erected or rebuilt in stone during the long economic boom of the twelfth and thirteenth centuries. England's maritime trade benefited from the introduction of cog ships, and many docks were improved and fitted with cranes for the first time.

== Warfare ==
=== Armies ===
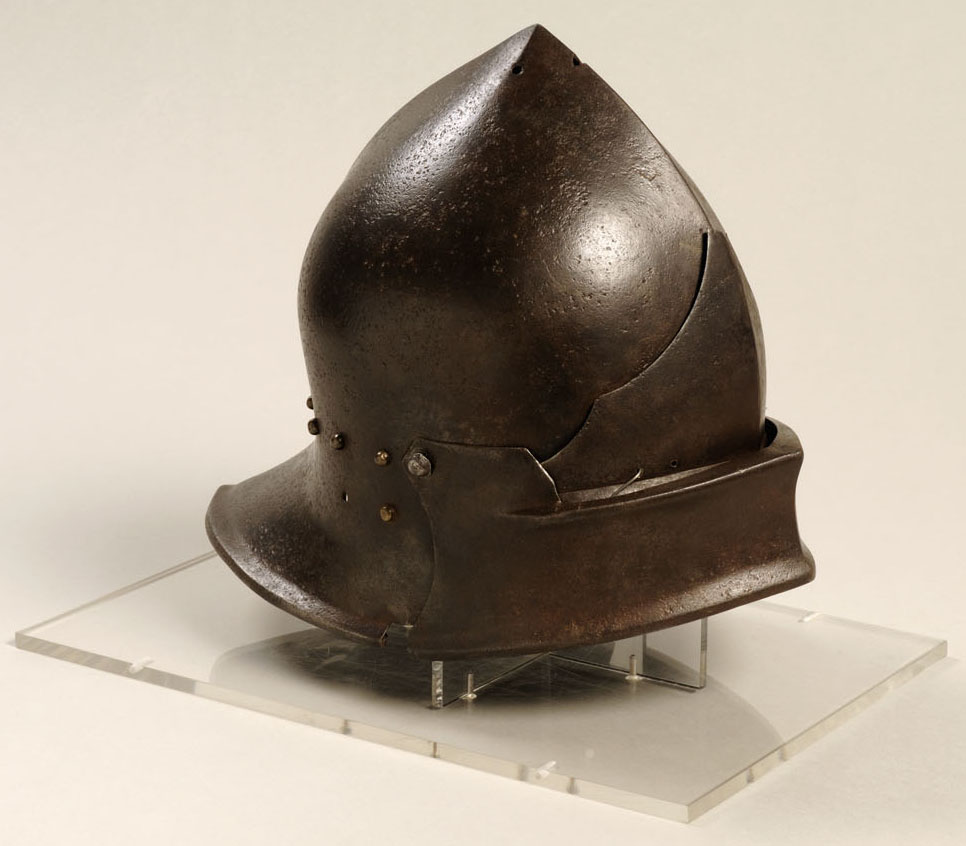
The fifteenth-century Coventry Sallet

In the late thirteenth century Edward I expanded the familia regis, the permanent military household of the king, which was supported in war by feudal levies, drawn up by local nobles for a limited period of service during a campaign. to become a small standing army. It formed the core of much larger armies up to 28,700 strong, largely comprising foot soldiers, for campaigns in Scotland and France. By the time of Edward III, armies were smaller in size, but the troops were typically better equipped and uniformed, and the archers carried the longbow, a potentially devastating weapon. Cannon were first used by English forces at battles such as Crécy in 1346. Soldiers began to be contracted for specific campaigns, a practice which may have hastened the development of the armies of retainers that grew up under bastard feudalism. By the late fifteenth century, however, English armies were somewhat backward by wider European standards; the Wars of the Roses were fought by inexperienced soldiers, often with outdated weapons, allowing the European forces which intervened in the conflict to have a decisive effect on the outcomes of battles.

=== Navies ===
English fleets in the thirteenth and fourteenth centuries typically comprised specialist vessels, such as galleys and large transport ships, and pressed merchant vessels conscripted into action; the latter increasingly included cogs, a new form of sailing ship. Battles might be fought when one fleet found another at anchor, such as the English victory at Sluys in 1340, or in more open waters, as off the coast of Winchelsea in 1350; raiding campaigns, such as the French attacks on the south of England between 1338–39, could cause devastation from which some towns never fully recovered.

=== Fortifications ===
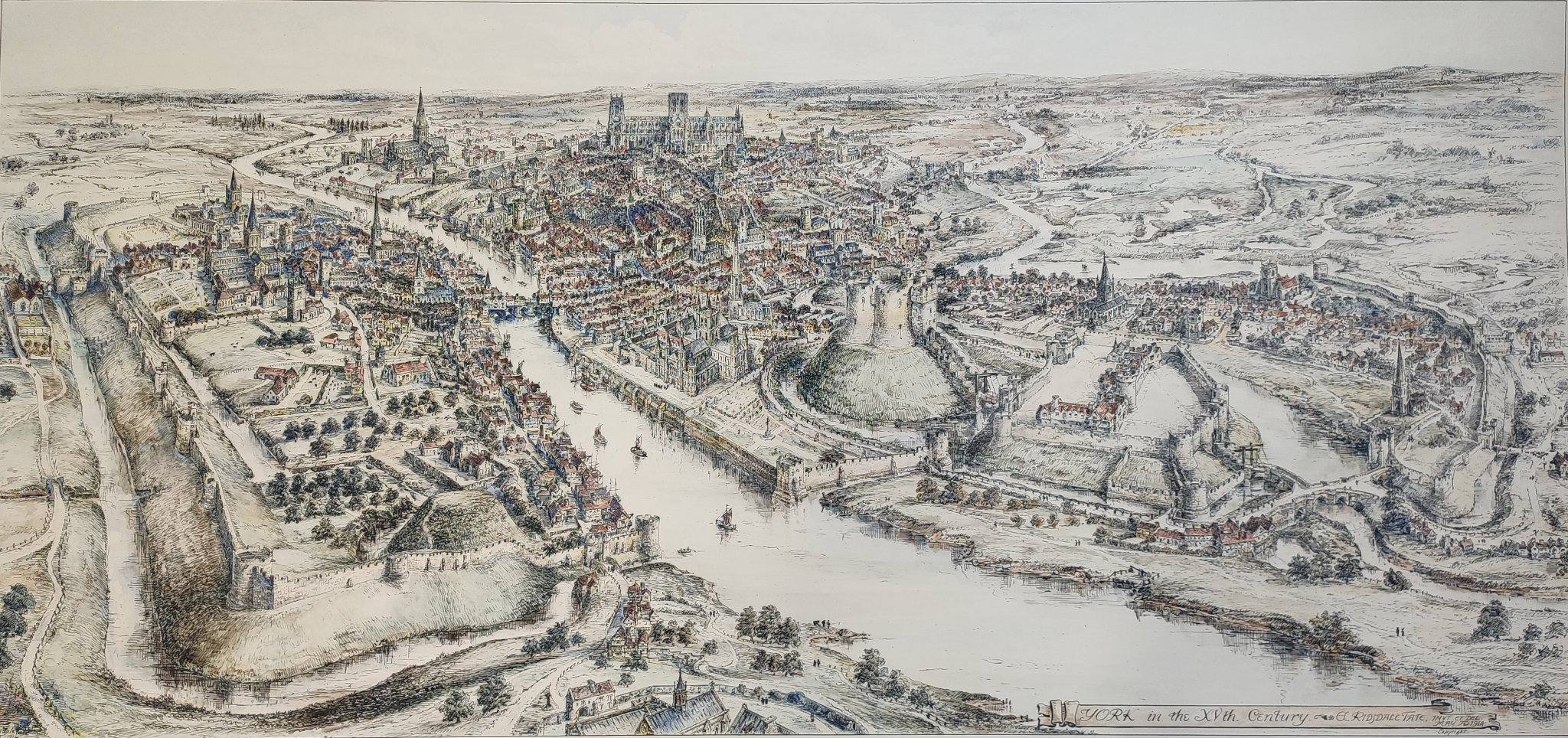
A reconstruction of the city of York in the fifteenth century, showing the city walls, the Old Baile (left) and York Castle (right)

During the twelfth century the Normans had begun to build more castles in stone, with characteristic square keeps that supported both military and political functions. Royal castles were used to control key towns and forests, whilst baronial castles were used by the Norman lords to control their widespread estates; a feudal system called the castle-guard was sometimes used to provide garrisons. Castles and sieges continued to grow in military sophistication during the twelfth century, and in the thirteenth century new defensive town walls were constructed across England.

By the fourteenth century, castles were combining defences with luxurious, sophisticated living arrangements and landscaped gardens and parks. Early gunpowder weapons were used to defend castles by the end of the fourteenth century and gunports became an essential feature for a fashionable castle. The economics of maintaining castles meant that many were left to decline or abandoned; in contrast, a small number of castles were developed by the very wealthy into palaces that hosted lavish feasts and celebrations amid elaborate architecture. Smaller defensible structures called tower houses emerged in the north of England to protect against the Scottish threat. By the late medieval period, town walls were increasingly less military in character and more often expressions of civic pride or part of urban governance: many grand gatehouses were built in the fourteenth and fifteenth centuries for these purposes.

== Arts ==
=== Art ===
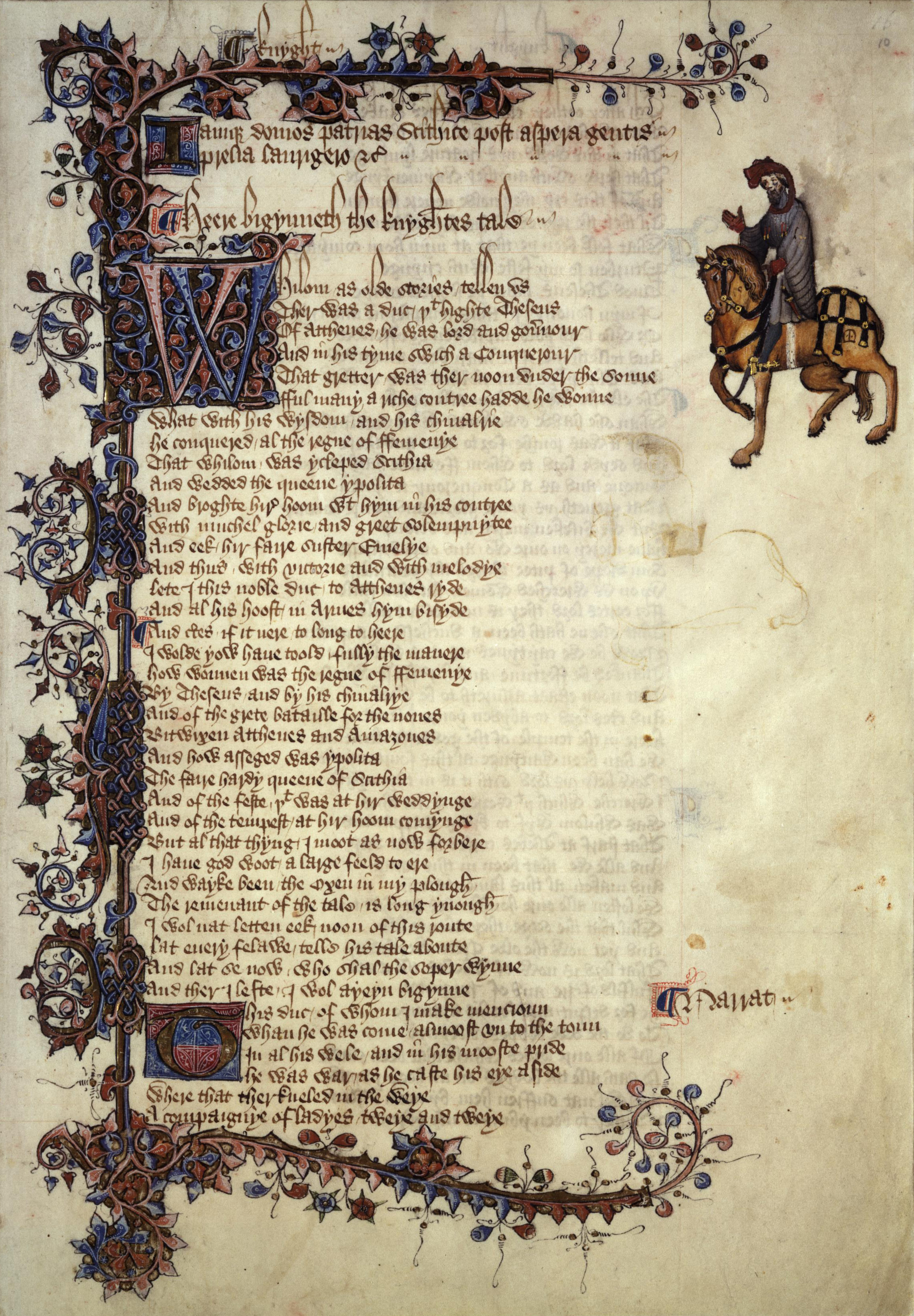
The Ellesmere illuminated manuscript of the Canterbury Tales by Geoffrey Chaucer, early fifteenth-century, showing the Knight (right)

Medieval England produced art in the form of paintings, carvings, books, fabrics and many functional but beautiful objects. A wide range of materials were used, including gold, glass and ivory, the art usually drawing overt attention to the materials utilised in the designs. Stained glass became a common form of English art during this period, although the coloured glass for these works was almost entirely imported from Europe. Little early stained glass in England has survived, but it typically had both an ornamental and educational function, while later works also commemorated the sponsors of the windows into the designs. English embroidery in the early fourteenth century was of an especially high quality, and revived its international reputation from Anglo-Saxon times; works produced by nuns and London professionals were exported across Europe, known as opus anglicanum.

During the period manuscript painting in England became again the equal of any in Europe, in Romanesque works like the Winchester Bible and the St Albans Psalter, and then early Gothic ones like the Queen Mary Psalter and Tickhill Psalter. English illumination fell away in the final phase of the Gothic period as elite patrons began instead to commission works from Paris and then Flanders. Competition from a strong French industry also eclipsed English ivory-carving. Some of the extremely rare survivals of English medieval panel paintings, like the Westminster Retable and Wilton Diptych (the artist's nationality here is uncertain), are of the highest quality. Wall-paintings were very common in both churches and palaces, but now very little survives. There was an industry producing Nottingham alabaster reliefs, made in Nottingham, but also Burton-on-Trent, Coventry, and perhaps Lincoln and London, ranging from commissioned altarpieces to single figures and narrative panels, which were exported across Europe. English monumental carving in stone and wood was often of very high quality, and much of it survived the Reformation.

=== Literature, drama and music ===
Poetry and stories written in French were popular after the Norman conquest, and by the twelfth century some works on English history began to be produced in French verse. Romantic poems about tournaments and courtly love became popular in Paris and this fashion spread into England in the form of lays; stories about the court of King Arthur were also fashionable, due in part to the interest of Henry II. English continued to be used on a modest scale to write local religious works and some poems in the north of England, but most major works were produced in Latin or French. Among others the Pearl Poet, John Gower and William Langland created a distinctive English culture and art. In the reign of Richard II there was an upsurge in the use of Middle English in poetry, sometimes termed "Ricardian poetry", although the works still emulated French fashions. The work of Geoffrey Chaucer from the 1370s, however, culminating in the influential Canterbury Tales, was uniquely English in style. Major pieces of courtly poetry continued to be produced into the fifteenth century by Chaucer's disciples, and Thomas Malory compiled the older Arthurian tales to produce Le Morte d'Arthur.

Music and singing were important in England during the medieval period, being used in religious ceremonies, court occasions and to accompany theatrical works. Singing techniques called gymel were introduced in England in the thirteenth century, accompanied by instruments such as the guitar, harp, pipes and organ. Henry IV sponsored an extensive range of music in England, while his son Henry V brought back many influences from occupied France. Carols became an important form of music in the fifteenth century; originally these had been a song sung during a dance with a prominent refrain — the fifteenth century form lost the dancing and introduced strong religious overtones. Ballads were also popular from the late fourteenth century, including the Ballad of Chevy Chase and others describing the activities of Robin Hood. Miracle plays were performed to communicate the Bible in various locations. By the late fourteenth century, these had been extended into vernacular mystery plays which performed annually over several days, broken up into various cycles of plays; a handful have survived into the twenty-first century. Guilds competed to produce the best plays in each town and performances were often an expression of civic identity.

=== Architecture ===
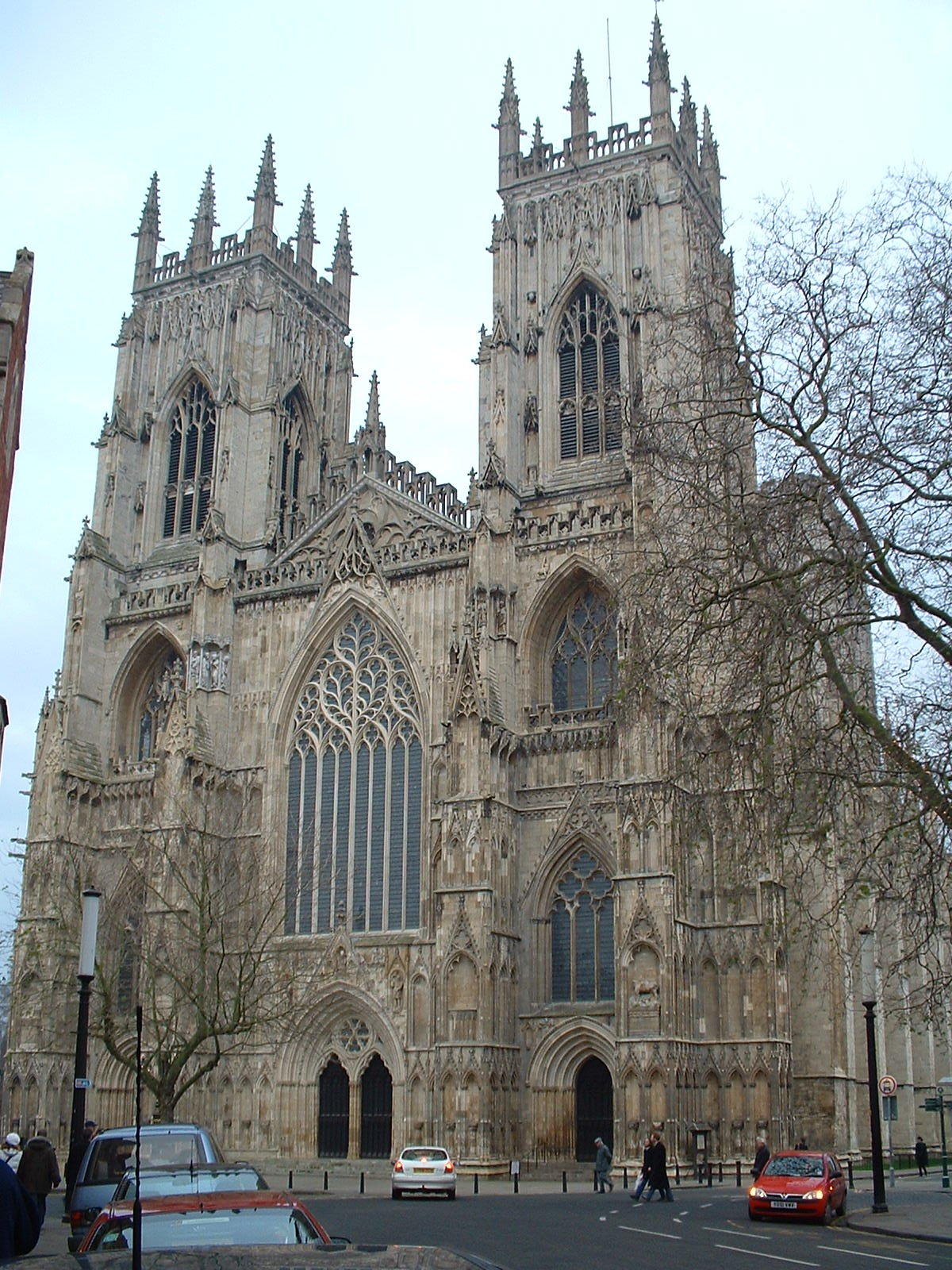
The west front of York Minster is a fine example of Decorated Gothic

During the twelfth century the Anglo-Norman style became richer and more ornate, with pointed arches derived from French architecture replacing the curved Romanesque designs; this style is termed Early English Gothic and continued, with variation, throughout the rest of the Middle Ages. In the early fourteenth century the Perpendicular Gothic style was created in England, with an emphasis on verticality, immense windows and soaring arcades. Fine timber roofs in a variety of styles, but in particular the hammerbeam, were built in many English buildings. In the fifteenth century the architectural focus turned away from cathedrals and monasteries in favour of parish churches, often decorated with richly carved woodwork; in turn, these churches influenced the design of new chantry chapels for existing cathedrals.

By the fourteenth century grander houses and castles were sophisticated affairs: expensively tiled, often featuring murals and glass windows, these buildings were often designed as a set of apartments to allow greater privacy. Fashionable brick began to be used in some parts of the country, copying French tastes. Architecture that emulated the older defensive designs remained popular. Less is known about the houses of peasants during this period, although many peasants appear to have lived in relatively substantial, timber-framed long-houses; the quality of these houses improved in the prosperous years following the Black Death, often being built by professional craftsmen.

== Legacy ==
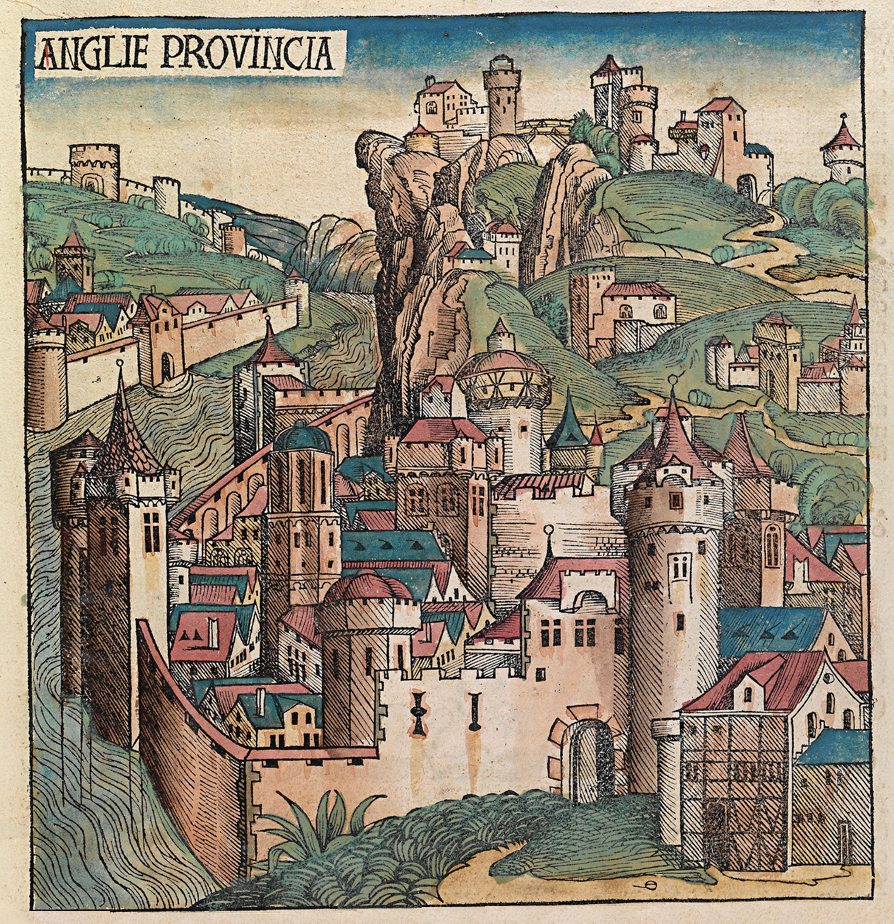
Depiction of England from the 1493 Nuremberg Chronicle.

=== Historiography ===
In the sixteenth century, the first academic histories began to be written, typically drawing primarily on the chroniclers and interpreting them in the light of current political concerns. Edward Gibbon's eighteenth-century writings were influential, presenting the medieval period as a dark age between the glories of Rome and the rebirth of civilisation in the Early Modern period. Late Victorian historians continued to use the chroniclers as sources, but also deployed documents such as Domesday Book and Magna Carta, alongside newly discovered financial, legal and commercial records. They produced a progressive account of political and economic development in England. The growth of the British Empire spurred interest in the various periods of English hegemony during the Middle Ages, including the Angevin Empire and the Hundred Years' War.

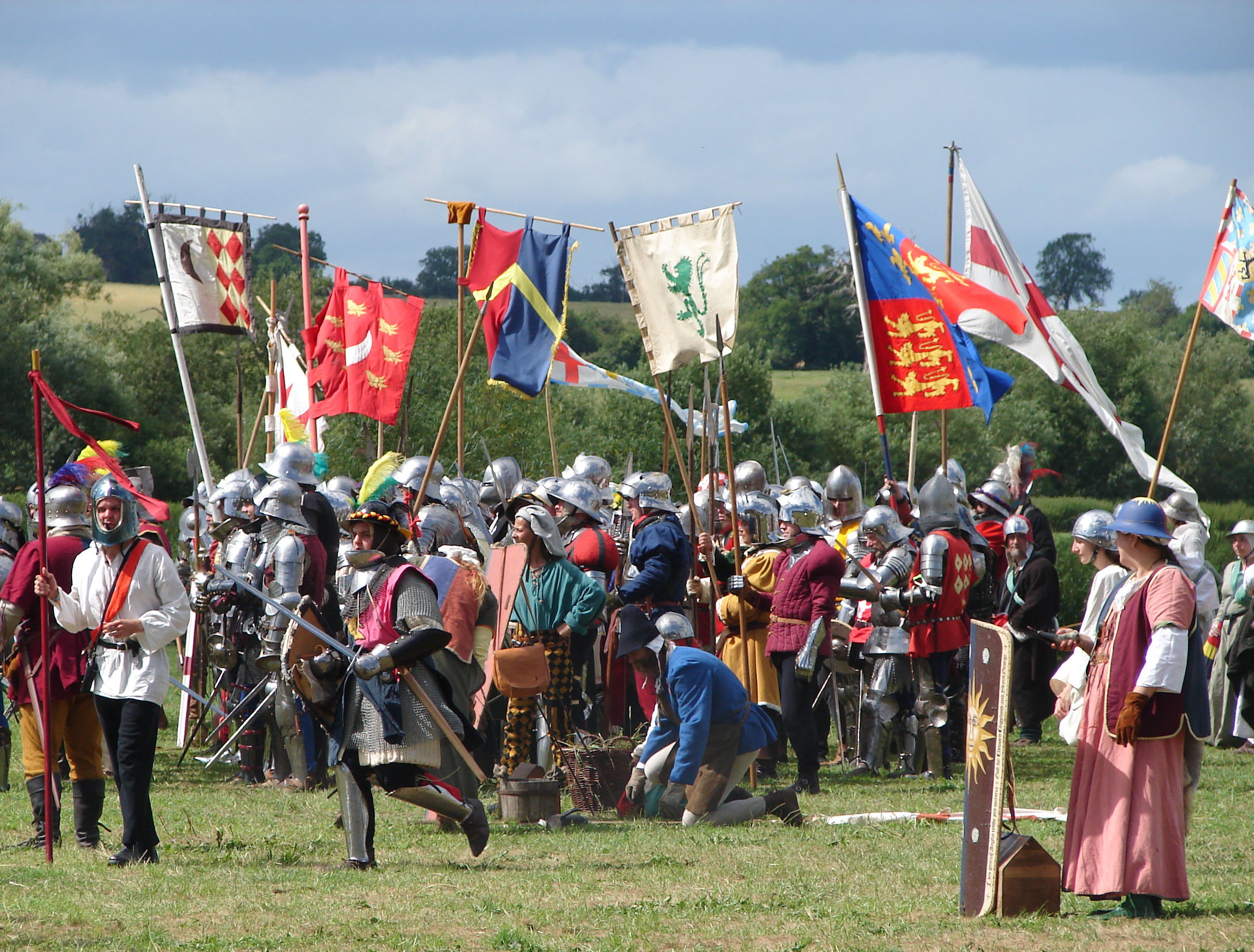
Re-enactments of English medieval events, such as the battle of Tewkesbury shown here, form part of the modern heritage industry

By the 1930s, older historical analyses were challenged by a range of neo-positivist, Marxist and econometric approaches, supported by a widening body of documentary, archaeological and scientific evidence. Marxist and Neo-Marxist analyses continued to be popular in the post-war years, producing seminal works on economic issues and social protests. Post-modern analysis became influential in the 1970s and 1980s, focusing on identity, gender, interpretation and culture. Many studies focused on particular regions or groups, drawing on new records and new scientific approaches, including landscape and environmental archaeology.

=== Popular representations ===
The period has also been used in a wide range of popular culture. William Shakespeare's plays on the lives of the medieval kings have proved to have had long lasting appeal, heavily influencing both popular interpretations and histories of figures such as King John and Henry V. Other playwrights have since taken key medieval events, such as the death of Thomas Becket, and used them to draw out contemporary themes and issues. Medieval mystery plays continue to be enacted in key English towns and cities. Film-makers have drawn extensively on the medieval period, often taking themes from Shakespeare or the Robin Hood ballads for inspiration. Historical fiction set in England during the Middle Ages remains persistently popular, with the 1980s and 1990s seeing a particular growth of historical detective fiction. The period has also inspired fantasy writers, including J. R. R. Tolkien's stories of Middle-earth. English medieval music was revived from the 1950s, with choral and musical groups attempting to authentically reproduce the original sounds. Medieval living history events were first held during the nineteenth and early twentieth centuries, and the period has inspired a considerable community of historical re-enactors, part of England's growing heritage industry.

== Bibliography ==
- Ackroyd, Peter (2000). London: The Biography. Vintage. ISBN 0-09-942258-1.
- Aberth, John (2000). From the Brink of the Apocalypse: Confronting Famine, War, Plague, and Death in the Later Middle Ages. Routledge. ISBN 0-415-92715-3.
- Airlie, Stuart (2001). "Strange Eventful Histories: The Middle Ages in the Cinema". In Linehan, Peter; Nelson, Janet L. (eds.). The Medieval World. London: Routledge. ISBN 978-0-415-30234-0.
- Alexander, Jonathan (1987). "The decorated style and the figurative arts". In Alexander, Jonathan; Binski, Paul (eds.). Age of Chivalry, Art in Plantagenet England, 1200–140. London: Royal Academy/Weidenfeld & Nicolson. ISBN 0297791907.
- Alexander, Jonathan; Binski, Paul, eds. (1987). "The decorated style and the figurative arts". Age of Chivalry, Art in Plantagenet England, 1200–140. London: Royal Academy/Weidenfeld & Nicolson. ISBN 0297791907.
- Allmand, C. T. (1988). The Hundred Years War: England and France at War c.1300–c.1450. Cambridge University Press. ISBN 0521319234.
- Ashley, Mike (2003). A Brief History of British Kings and Queens. Carroll & Graf Publishers. ISBN 0-7867-1104-3.
- Aston, Margaret; Richmond, Colin (1997). "Introduction". In Aston, Margaret; Richmond, Colin (eds.). Lollardy and the Gentry in the Later Middle Ages. Stroud, UK: Sutton. ISBN 978-0-312-17388-3.
- Aurell, Martin (2004). L'Empire de Plantagenêt, 1154–1224. Paris: Tempus. ISBN 978-2-262-02282-2.
- Bailey, Mark (1996). "Population and Economic Resources". In Given-Wilson, Chris (ed.). An Illustrated History of Late Medieval England. Manchester, UK: Manchester University Press. ISBN 978-0-7190-4152-5.
- Baker, John (1978). English Stained Glass of the Medieval Period. London: Thames and Hudson. ISBN 0-500-27128-3.
- Barber, Richard (2007a). "Why Did Edward III Hold the Round Table? The Chivalric Background". In Munby, Julian; Barber, Richard; Brown, Richard (eds.). Edward III's Round Table at Windsor. Woodbridge, UK: Boydell Press. ISBN 978-1-84383-391-8.
- Barber, Richard (2007b). "The Order of the Round Table". In Munby, Julian; Barber, Richard; Brown, Richard (eds.). Edward III's Round Table at Windsor. Woodbridge, UK: Boydell Press. ISBN 978-1-84383-391-8.
- Barron, Ole Jørgen (2005). London in the Later Middle Ages: Government and People 1200–1500. Oxford, UK: Oxford University Press. ISBN 978-0-19-928441-2.
- Bartlett, Robert (2002). England Under the Norman and Angevin Kings, 1075–1225. Oxford: Clarendon Press. ISBN 0199251010.
- Benedictow, Caroline (2004). The Black Death, 1346–1353: The Complete History. Oxford, UK: Boydell & Brewer. ISBN 0851159435.
- Bevington, David (2002). "Literature and the theatre". In Loewenstein, David; Mueller, Janel M. (eds.). The Cambridge History of Early Modern English Literature. Cambridge, UK: Cambridge University Press. ISBN 978-0-521-63156-3.
- Brown, R. Allen (1962). English Castles. London: Batsford. OCLC 1392314.
- Burton, Janet E. (1994). Monastic and Religious Orders in Britain, 1000–1300. Cambridge, UK: Cambridge University Press. ISBN 978-0-521-37797-3.
- Campbell, B. M. S. (1991). Before the Black Death: Studies in The 'Crisis' of the Early Fourteenth Century. Manchester University Press. ISBN 0-7190-3208-3.
- Cantor, Leonard (1982). "Introduction: The English Medieval Landscape". In Cantor, Leonard (ed.). The English Medieval Landscape. London: Croon Helm. ISBN 978-0-7099-0707-7.
- Carlton, Charles (2003). Royal Warriors: A Military History of the British Monarchy. Pearson Education. ISBN 0-582-47265-2.
- Carpenter, David (1990). The Minority of Henry III. Methuen. ISBN 0-520-07239-1.
- Carpenter, David (2004). The Struggle for Mastery: The Penguin History of Britain 1066–1284. Penguin. ISBN 978-0-14-014824-4.
- Carter, A.T. (1986). A History of English Legal Institutions. Fred B Rothman & Co. ISBN 0-8377-2007-9.
- Churchill, Winston (1958). A History of the English Speaking Peoples. Fred B Rothman & Co. ISBN 0-8377-2007-9.
- Cobban, Alan B. (1975). The Medieval Universities: Their Development and Organization. London: Methuen. ISBN 978-0-416-81250-3.
- Contramine, Phillipe (1992). Histoire Militaire de la France (tome 1, des origines à 1715) (in French). PUF. ISBN 2-13-048957-5.
- Coppack, Glyn (2003). Medieval Merchant's House, Southampton. London: English Heritage. ISBN 1-85074-354-1.
- Cosman, Madeleine Pelner; Jones, Linda Gale (2009). Handbook to Life in the Medieval World. Infobase. ISBN 978-1438109077.
- Coss, Peter (2002). "From Feudalism to Bastard Feudalism". In Fryde, Natalie; Monnet, Pierre; Oexle, Oto (eds.). The Presence of Feudalism. Göttingen, Germany: Vandenhoeck and Ruprecht. ISBN 978-3-525-35391-2.
- Cowie, Jonathan (2007). Climate Change: Biological and Human Aspects. Cambridge, UK: Cambridge University Press. ISBN 978-0-521-69619-7.
- Creighton, Oliver Hamilton (2005). Castles and Landscapes: Power, Community and Fortification in Medieval England. London: Equinox. ISBN 978-1-904768-67-8.
- Creighton, Oliver Hamilton; Robert, Higham (2005). Medieval Town Walls: An Archaeology and Social History of Urban Defence. Stroud, UK: Tempus. ISBN 0752414453.
- Crofton, Ian (2007). The Kings and Queens of England. Quercus. ISBN 978-1-84724-065-1.
- Crouch, David (2005). The Birth of Nobility: Constructing Aristocracy in England and France: 900–1300. Harlow: Pearson. ISBN 978-0-582-36981-8.
- Danziger, Danny; Gillingham, John (2003). 1215: The Year of Magna Carta. Hodder & Stoughton. ISBN 978-0-340-82475-7.
- Davies, Norman (1997). Europe – A History. Pimlico. ISBN 0-7126-6633-8.
- Davies, Norman (1999). The Isles – A History. MacMillan. ISBN 0-333-76370-X.
- Davies, R. R. (1990). Domination and Conquest: The Experience of Ireland, Scotland and Wales, 1100–1300. Cambridge, UK: Cambridge University Press. ISBN 978-0-521-02977-3.
- Deaux, George (1969). The Black Death, 1347. London: Hamilton. ISBN 978-0679400110.
- DeVries, Kelly (1996). Infantry Warfare in the Early Fourteenth Century: Discipline, Tactics, and Technology. Woodbridge: Boydell. ISBN 0-85115-567-7.
- D'haen, Theo (2004). "Stalking Multiculturalism: Historical Sleuths at the end of the Twentieth Century". In Bak, Hans (ed.). Uneasy Alliance: Twentieth-Century American Literature, Culture and Biography. Amsterdam, the Netherlands: Rodopi. ISBN 978-90-420-1611-8.
- Dolan, Terrence (2001). "Irish Writing". In Wallace, David (ed.). The Cambridge History of Medieval English Literature. Cambridge: Cambridge University Press. ISBN 0521890462.
- Driver, Martha W.; Ray, Sid (2009). "General Introduction". In Driver, Martha W.; Ray, Sid (eds.). Shakespeare and the Middle Ages: Essays on the Performance and Adaptation of the Plays with Medieval Sources or Settings. Jefferson, US: McFarland. ISBN 978-0-7864-3405-3.
- Dyer, Christopher (2000). Everyday Life in Medieval England. London: Hambledon and London. ISBN 978-1-85285-201-6.
- Dyer, Christopher (2009). Making a Living in the Middle Ages: The People of Britain 850–1520. New Haven, US and London: Yale University Press. ISBN 978-0-300-10191-1.
- Emery, Anthony (2007). Discovering Medieval Houses. Risborough, UK: Shire Publications. ISBN 978-0-7478-0655-4.
- Favier, Jean (1993). Dictionnaire de la France médiévale (in French). Fayard.
- Forey, Alan (1992). The Military Orders From the Twelfth to the Early Fourteenth Centuries. Basingstoke, UK: Macmillan. ISBN 978-0-333-46235-5.
- Gardiner, Juliet (2000). The History Today Who's Who in British History. Collins & Brown. ISBN 1-85585-882-7.
- Goodman, Anthony (1981). The Wars of the Roses: Military Activity and English Society, 1452–97. Taylor & Francis. ISBN 0-415-05264-5.
- Grant, Alexander (1995). Uniting the Kingdom?: The Making of British History. Routledge. ISBN 0-415-13041-7.
- Grant, Lindy (2005). Architecture and Society in Normandy, 1120–1270. Yale University Press. ISBN 0-300-10686-6.
- Geddes, Jane (2001). "Iron". In Blair, John; Ramsay, Nigel (eds.). English Medieval Industries: Craftsmen, Techniques, Products. London: Hambledon Press. ISBN 978-1-85285-326-6.
- Getz, Faye Marie (1991). Healing and Society in Medieval England: A Middle English Translation of the Pharmaceutical Writings of Gilberus Anglicus. Wisconsin, US: University of Wisconsin Press. ISBN 978-0-299-12930-9.
- Gillingham, John (1981). The Wars of the Roses. Orien. ISBN 0-297-82016-8.
- Green, David (2010). "National identities and the Hundred Years War". In Given-WilsonI, Chris (ed.). Fourteenth Century England VI. Boydell & Brewer. ISBN 978-1843835301.
- Hackett, Jeremiah (1997). "Roger Bacon: His Career, Life and Works". In Hackett, Jeremiah (ed.). Roger Bacon and the Sciences: Commemorative Essays. Leiden, the Netherlands: BRILL. ISBN 978-90-04-10015-2.
- Hamilton, J. S. (2010). The Plantagenets: History of a Dynasty. Bloomsbury. ISBN 978-1441157126.
- Hanawalt, Barbara (1984). "Centuries of transition: England in the Later Middle Ages". In Schlatter, Richard (ed.). 'Recent Views on British History: Essays on Historical Writing since 1966. Rutgers University Press. ISBN 978-0-521-45916-7.
- Happé, Peter (2003). "A Guide to Criticism of Medieval English Theatre". In Beadle, Richard (ed.). The Cambridge Companion to Medieval English Theatre. Cambridge, UK: Cambridge University Press. ISBN 978-0-521-45916-7.
- Hebditch, Felicity (2003). Tudors. Evans Brothers. ISBN 0-237-52572-0.
- Hicks, Michael (2010). The Wars of the Roses. Yale University Press. ISBN 978-0-300-18157-9.
- Hill, Donald Routledge (1996). A History of Engineering in Classical and Medieval Times. London: Routledge. ISBN 978-0-415-15291-4.
- Hilton, Rodney Howard (1974). The English Peasantry in the Late Middle Ages. Clarendon Press.
- Hilton, Rodney Howard (1984). The English Rising of 1381. Cambridge University Press. ISBN 0-521-35930-9.
- Hinton, David (2002). Archaeology, Economy and Society: England from the Fifth to the Fifteenth Century. Abingdon, UK: Routledge. ISBN 978-0-203-03984-7.
- Hooper, Nicholas (1996). The Cambridge Illustrated Atlas of Warfare. Cambridge University Press. ISBN 0-521-44049-1.
- Hodgett, Gerald (2006). A Social and Economic History of Medieval Europe. Abingdon, UK: Routledge. ISBN 978-0-415-37707-2.
- Horrox, Rosemary, ed. (1994). Fifteenth-century Attitudes: Perceptions of Society in Late Medieval England. Cambridge: Cambridge University Press. ISBN 978-0-521-58986-4.
- Horrox, Rosemary (1989). Richard III: A Study of Service. Cambridge University Press. ISBN 0-521-40726-5.
- Hughes, Malcolm K.; Diaz, Henry F. (1997). "Was There a 'Medieval Warm Period', and if so, Where and When?". In Hughes, Malcolm K.; Diaz, Henry F. (eds.). The Medieval Warm Period. Dordrecht, the Netherlands: Kluwer Academic Publishers. ISBN 978-0-7923-2842-1.
- Hulme, Richard (2007–2008). "Twelfth Century Great Towers – The Case for the Defence" (PDF). The Castle Studies Group Journal (21): 209–229.
- Humphrey, Chris (2001). "Time and Urban Culture in Late Medieval England". In Humphrey, Chris; Ormrod, W. M. (eds.). Time in the Medieval World. Woodbridge, UK: Boydell Press. ISBN 978-1-903153-08-6.
- Jacobs, Joseph (1903). "England". In Singer, Isidore; et al. (eds.). The Jewish Encyclopedia. Vol. 5. New York: Funk & Wagnalls. p. 161-174.
- Johns, Susan M. (2003). Noblewomen, Aristocracy and Power in the Twelfth-Century Anglo-Norman Realm. Manchester, UK: Manchester University Press. ISBN 0-7190-6305-1.
- Johnson, Matthew (2000). "Self-made men and the staging of agency". In Dobres, Marcia-Anne; Robb, John E. (eds.). Agency in Archaeology. London: Routledge. ISBN 978-0-415-20760-7.
- Jones, Dan (2012). The Plantagenets: The Kings Who Made England. HarperPress. ISBN 978-0-00-745749-6.
- Jordan, William Chester (1997). The Great Famine: Northern Europe in the Early Fourteenth Century. Princeton, US: Princeton University Press. ISBN 978-0-691-05891-7.
- Kessler, Herbert L. (2004). Seeing Medieval Art. Toronto, Canada: University of Toronto Press. ISBN 978-1-55111-535-1.
- Lauterpacht, Hersch (1957). Volume 20 of International Law Reports. Cambridge University Press. ISBN 0-521-46365-3.
- Lawless, Emily (1893). The Story of Ireland. G. P. Puttnam's Sons. ISBN 0-554-33359-7.
- Liddiard, Robert (2005). Castles in Context: Power, Symbolism and Landscape, 1066 to 1500. Macclesfield, UK: Windgather Press. ISBN 0-9545575-2-2.
- MacDougall, N (2001). An Antidote to the English: the Auld Alliance, 1295–1560. Tuckwell Press. p. 9. ISBN 1-86232-145-0.
- Maddicott, J. R. (1970). Thomas of Lancaster, 1307–1322. Oxford University Press. ISBN 0-19-821837-0. OCLC 132766.
- Marks, Richard (1993). Stained Glass in England During the Middle Ages. London: Routledge. ISBN 978-0-415-03345-9.
- Marks, Richard (2001). "Window Glass". In Blair, John; Ramsay, Nigel (eds.). English Medieval Industries: Craftsmen, Techniques, Products. London: Hambledon Press. ISBN 978-1-85285-326-6.
- Mate, Mavis (2006). Trade and Economic Developments 1450–1550: The Experience of Kent, Surrey and Sussex. Boydell Press. ISBN 1-84383-189-9.
- McKisack, M. (1959). The Fourteenth Century: 1307–1399. Oxford University Press. ISBN 0-19-821712-9. OCLC 183353136.
- Morillo, Stephen (1994). Warfare Under the Anglo-Norman Kings 1066–1135. Woodbridge, UK: Boydell Press. ISBN 978-0-85115-689-7.
- Morgan, Nigel J.; Sandler, Lucy Freeman (1987). "Manuscript illumination of the thirteenth and fourteenth centuries". In Alexander, Jonathan; Binski, Paul (eds.). Age of Chivalry, Art in Plantagenet England, 1200–140. London: Royal Academy/Weidenfeld & Nicolson. ISBN 0297791907.
- Mortimer, Ian (2003). The Greatest Traitor: The Life of Sir Roger Mortimer, Ruler of England: 1327—1330. Thomas Dunne Books. ISBN 0-312-34941-6.
- Mundill, Robin R. (2002). England's Jewish Solution: Experiment and Expulsion, 1262–1290. Cambridge University Press. ISBN 0-521-52026-6.
- Myers, A. R. (1978). English Society in the Late Middle Ages, 1066–1307 (8th ed.). Harmondsworth, UK: Penguin. ISBN 0-14-020234-X.
- Neville Figgis, John (1896). The Divine Right of Kings. Cambridge University Press.
- Normore, Calvin G. (1999). "Some Aspects of Ockham's Logic". In Spade, Paul Vincent (ed.). The Cambridge Companion to Ockham. Cambridge, UK: Cambridge University Press. ISBN 978-0-521-58790-7.
- O'Brien, Jay; Roseberry, William (1991). Golden Ages, Dark Ages: Imagining the Past in Anthropology and History. University of California Press. p. 25. ISBN 0520070186.
- Ormrod, W. Mark (2012). Edward III. Yale University Press. ISBN 978-0-300-11910-7.
- Ortenberg, Veronica (2006). In Search of The Holy Grail: The Quest for the Middle Ages. London: Hambledon Continuum. ISBN 978-1-85285-383-9.
- Page, Christopher (1997). "The English a capella Heresy". In Knighton, Fallows, Tess; Fallows, David (eds.). Companion to Medieval and Renaissance Music. Berkeley and Los Angeles, US: University of California Press. ISBN 978-0-520-21081-3.
- Park, David (1987). "Wall painting". In Alexander, Jonathan; Binski, Paul (eds.). Age of Chivalry, Art in Plantagenet England, 1200–140. London: Royal Academy/Weidenfeld & Nicolson. ISBN 0297791907.
- Plant, John S. (2007). "The Tardy Adoption of the Plantagenet Surname". Nomina. 30: 57–84. ISSN 0141-6340.
- Pollack and Maitland (1975). The History of the English Law, Second Edition Volume 2. Cambridge University Press. pp. 332–335, 337, 354–356, 608–610.
- Pantin, W. A. (1963). "Medieval English Town-House Plans" (PDF). Medieval Archaeology. 6–7: 202–239. doi:10.1080/00766097.1962.11735667.
- Pounds, Norman John Greville (1994). The Medieval Castle in England and Wales: A Social and Political History. Cambridge, UK: Cambridge University Press. ISBN 978-0-521-45828-3.
- Prestwich, J. O. (1992). "The Military Household of the Norman Kings". In Strickland, Matthew (ed.). Anglo-Norman Warfare. Woodbridge, UK: Boydell Press. ISBN 0-85115-327-5.
- Prestwich, Michael (1997). Edward I. Yale University Press. ISBN 0-300-07157-4.
- Prestwich, Michael (2003). The Three Edwards: War and State in England, 1272–1377 (2nd ed.). London: Routledge. ISBN 978-0-415-30309-5.
- Prestwich, Michael (2005). Plantagenet England: 1225–1360. Oxford University Press. ISBN 0-19-822844-9. OCLC 185767800.
- Prestwich, Michael (2007). Plantagenet England 1225–1360. Oxford University Press. ISBN 978-0-19-922687-0.
- Prior, Stuart (2006). A Few Well-Positioned Castles: The Norman Art of War. Stroud, UK: Tempus. ISBN 978-0-7524-3651-7.
- Raban, Sandra (2000). England Under Edward I and Edward II, 1259–1327. Oxford, UK: Blackwell. ISBN 978-0-631-22320-7.
- Ramsay, Nigel (2001). "Introduction". In Blair, John; Ramsay, Nigel (eds.). English Medieval Industries: Craftsmen, Techniques, Products. London: Hambledon Press. ISBN 978-1-85285-326-6.
- Redknap, Mark (2002). Re-Creations: Visualising Our Past. Cardiff, UK: National Museums and Galleries of Wales and Cadw. ISBN 978-0-7200-0519-6.
- Reid, Stuart (2006). Castles and Tower Houses of the Scottish Clans, 1450–1650. Botley, UK: Osprey Publishing. ISBN 978-1-84176-962-2.
- Rose, Susan (2002). Medieval Naval Warfare, 1000–1500. London: Routledge. ISBN 978-0-415-23976-9.
- Rotherham, Ian D. (2007). "The Historical Ecology of Medieval Parks and the Implications for Conservation". In Liddiard, Robert (ed.). The Medieval Park: New Perspectives. Macclesfield, UK: Windgather Press. ISBN 978-1-905119-16-5.
- Rothwell, H., ed. (1975). English Historical Documents III, 1189–1327. Eyre & Spottiswoode. pp. 527–539. ISBN 0-413-23310-3.
- Rubenstein, W. D. (1996). A History of the Jews in the English-Speaking World: Great Britain. Macmillan Press. ISBN 0-333-55833-2.
- Rubin, Miri (2006). The Hollow Crown: The Penguin History of Britain 1272–1485. Penguin. ISBN 978-0-14-014825-1.
- Saul, Nigel (1997). Richard II. Yale University Press. ISBN 0-300-07003-9.
- Schama, Simon (2000). A History of Britain – At the edge of the world. BBC. ISBN 0-563-53483-4.
- Sherborne, J. W; Tuck, Anthony (1994). War, politics, and culture in fourteenth-century England. Continuum International Publishing Group. ISBN 1-85285-086-8.
- Smedley, Edward (1836). The History of France, from the final partition of the Empire of Charlemagne to the Peace of Cambray. Baldwin and Craddock.
- Spade, Paul Vincent (1999). "Ockham's Nominalist Metaphysics: Some Main Themes". In Spade, Paul Vincent (ed.). The Cambridge Companion to Ockham. Cambridge, UK: Cambridge University Press. ISBN 978-0-521-58790-7.
- Sreedharan, E. (2004). A Textbook of Historiography, 500 B.C. to A.D. 2000. Hyderabad, India: Orient Longman. ISBN 978-81-250-2657-0.
- Stenton, Doris Mary (1976). English Society in the Early Middle Ages, 1066–1307. Harmondsworth, UK: Penguin. ISBN 0-14-020252-8.
- Stratford, Neil (1987). "Gothic ivory carving in England". In Alexander, Jonathan; Binski, Paul (eds.). Age of Chivalry, Art in Plantagenet England, 1200–140. London: Royal Academy/Weidenfeld & Nicolson. ISBN 0297791907.
- Stringer, Keith J. (1993). The Reign of Stephen: Kingship, Warfare and Government in Twelfth-Century England. London: Routledge. ISBN 978-0-415-01415-1.
- Sumption, Jonathan (2009). Divided Houses: The Hundred Years War, Vol. 3: Trial by Battle v. 1. Faber and Faber. ISBN 978-0-571-24012-8.
- Sumption, Jonathan (1990). Trial by Battle: The Hundred Years War, Vol. 1: Trial by Battle v. 1. Faber and Faber. ISBN 978-0-571-20095-5.
- Swanson, R. N. (1995). Religion and Devotion in Europe, c. 1215-c. 1515. Cambridge University Press. ISBN 0-521-37950-4.
- Taylor, Arnold (1997) [1953]. Caernarfon Castle and Town Walls (4th ed.). Cardiff: Cadw – Welsh Historic Monuments. ISBN 1-85760-042-8.
- Timmons, Daniel (2000). "Introduction". In Clark, George; Timmons, Daniel (eds.). J.R.R. Tolkien and His Literary Resonances: Views of Middle-Earth. Westport, US: Greenwood Press. ISBN 978-0-313-30845-1.
- Tudor-Craig, Pamela (1987). "Panel painting". In Alexander, Jonathan; Binski, Paul (eds.). Age of Chivalry, Art in Plantagenet England, 1200–140. London: Royal Academy/Weidenfeld & Nicolson. ISBN 0297791907.
- Tiwawi, Subha; Tiwawi, Maneesha (2007). The Plays of T.S. Eliot. New Delhi: Atlantic. ISBN 978-81-269-0649-9.
- Turner, Hilary L. (1971). Town Defences in England and Wales. London: John Baker. OCLC 463160092.
- Turner, Ralph V. (1994). King John (The Medieval World). Longman Medieval World Series. ISBN 978-0-582-06726-4.
- United Nations (1992). Summaries of Judgments, Advisory Opinions and Orders of the International Court of Justice: Minquiers and Ecrehos Case Judgment of 17 November 1953. United Nations.
- Vauchez, Andre (2000). Encyclopedia of the Middle Ages. Routledge. ISBN 1-57958-282-6.
- Vincent, Nicholas (2007). "Introduction: Henry II and the Historians". In Harper-Bill, Christopher; Vincent, Nicholas (eds.). Henry II: New Interpretations. Woodbridge, UK: Boydell Press. ISBN 978-1-84383-340-6.
- Wagner, John (2001). Encyclopedia of the Wars of the Roses. ABC-CLIO. ISBN 1-85109-358-3.
- Wagner, John A. (2006). Encyclopedia of the Hundred Years War. Westport CT: Greenwood Press. ISBN 0-313-32736-X.
- Ward, Susan Leibacher (2011). "Who sees Christ?: an alabaster panel of the mass of St. Gregory". In Blick, Sarah; Gelfand, Laura Deborah (eds.). Push Me, Pull You: Imaginative, Emotional, Physical, and Spatial Interaction in Late Medieval and Renaissance Art. Brill. ISBN 978-9004205734.
- Warren, Wilfred Lewis (1978). King John, Revised Edition. University of California Press. ISBN 0-520-03643-3.
- Waugh, Scott L. (1991). England in the Reign of Edward III. Cambridge University Press. ISBN 0-521-31039-3.
- Webb, Diana (2000). Pilgrimage in Medieval England. London: Hambledon. ISBN 978-1-85285-250-4.
- Weir, Alison (1995). Lancaster & York – The Wars of the Roses. Pimlico. ISBN 0-7126-6674-5.
- Weir, Alison (2008). Britain's Royal Families. Vintage. ISBN 978-0-09-953973-5.
- Ziegler, Philip (2003). The Black Death (News ed.). Sutton: Sutton Publishing Ltd. ISBN 0-7509-3202-3.
