= London guild conflicts =

14th Century factional conflict

- Factional civic strife among London guilds Part of Urban politics in late medieval England during the reigns of Edward III and Richard II
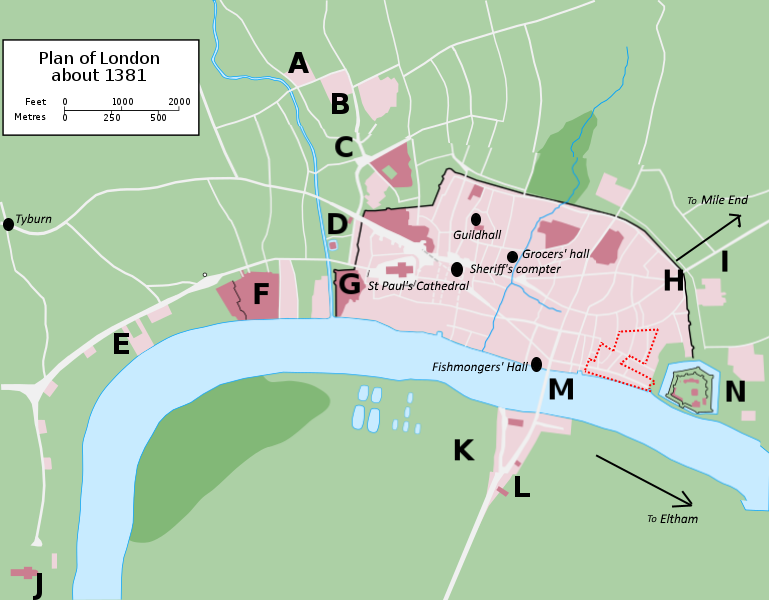
- Plan of London about 1381
- Date: 1370s–1380s
- Location: London, England; 51.5129°N 0.0918°W
- Caused by: Guild rivalries; Black Death; bullion shortage; heavy taxation; weak royal government; trade monopolies; disputes over civic self government
- Goals: Control of civic offices and policy; regulation of markets (e.g. fishmongers’ monopoly); protection or reform of city liberties
- Methods: Contested elections; petitions to Crown and Parliament; street mobilization and intimidation; legal prosecutions; occasional riots
- Status: Resolved by 1390s; factional turbulence diminished thereafter
- Result: Merchant oligarchy consolidated influence

Parties
Greater guilds (victuallers) — e.g. Grocers, Fishmongers; allies in royal administration	Lesser trades — e.g. cordwainers, butchers; reformers favouring wider participation and open markets; John of Gaunt

Lead figures
Nicholas Brembre; William Walworth; John Philipot; Nicholas Exton; later Richard Whittington	John Northampton, Nicholas Twyford, John More patron John of Gaunt

Casualties
- Arrested: Notably the arrest and exile of John Northampton (1384); other detentions during contested elections, and executions of John Constantine and Nicholas Brembre
- Overlapped with national crises including the Good Parliament (1376), Bad Parliament (1377), the Peasants' Revolt (1381), and the ascendancy of the Lords Appellant (1387–1388).

The London guild conflicts refer to period of intense civic conflict in the City of London during the 1370s and 1380s. The conflict was between rival political factions often centered on craft guilds or “misteries,” the predecessors of the later livery companies. These divisions reflected wider national divisions in the reigns of Edward III and Richard II and which largely centered around John of Gaunt's influence in the city.

== Background ==
=== Relations with the crown ===
The historian Michael Hicks has described late-medieval London as "the largest port, the largest market and retail outlet for luxuries and manufacture, and the largest employer" in Late Medieval England.

The Crown depended on the wealth of London's merchants for the subsidies and loans they provided particularly during times of war. Due to the precarious nature of government finances, London's access to cash meant that it was for the monarch important to be on good terms with the city, which was particularly the case after the collapse of Italian lenders to the crown. London also played a ceremonial role due to its proximity to Westminster.

For their part, London's citizens benefited from proximity to royal administration, justice, and patronage, with Parliament and the King's Council at Westminster. The city relied on the King to protect its trade abroad and its liberties at home.

Although a contemporary chronicler, Jean Froissart, believed Richard II favoured London at the expense of the rest of the kingdom, it is probable that King and city had poor opinions of the other.

=== Guilds and factions ===
As a large city London had been turbulent throughout the Middle Ages and had become increasingly so by the early 1370s. This violence was often diverted into City politics and London had been particularly riven with factional strife since the late 1370s. There were already rivalries between the merchant guilds who sold food into the city (victualling) and the other artisan guilds who were net consumers, as well as between London and non London based merchants. Other conflicts included those between the mercantile guilds, such as the Drapers and Grocers and conflicts within the guilds between masters.

In this period these rivalries were intensified by plague outbreaks with concomitant depopulation, a shortage of bullion and ready cash, combined with a high level of immigration and an as-yet undeveloped sense of community solidarity. Internal tension was exacerbated by weak central government, owing to Edward III's last years being characterised by illness and popular discontent, and his successor, Richard, being a minor, with rival factions vying to present themselves as defenders of the king’s interests. This was exacerbated by heavy taxation, French threats to foreign trade and royal interference in civic affairs.

These issues were to influence city politics until Richard lost his throne in 1399.

=== Administrative structure ===
London was governed and administered by men from its merchant class, who were organised by their trades into different guilds (or misteries). These men formed London's political upper class. They filled the offices of alderman, sheriff and Mayor. They governed through the Common Council. The council was omnicompetent, and dealt with the city's complex and often delicate relations with the King and royal government.

== History ==
=== Good Parliament ===
In 1372 the English suffered a naval defeat at La Rochelle which wool merchants feared left English wool exports undefended. In 1372 two large substantial wool merchants Nicholas Brembre and John Philipot were simultaneously elected as the Sheriffs of the City of London and Aldermen. This may have been the result of a deal with John Northampton's faction.

Richard Lyons dominated City politics in the mid 1370s and together with Adam Bury and John Pecche he had a monopoly on the sale of sweet wine in the city. This was lost at the Good Parliament of 1376 which in a generally anti-Gaunt mood saw the three impeached for corruption, an impeachment which weakened the power of Aldermen in London compared to the Common Council provoking a constitutional crisis in London. This loss of favour was partially reversed when they were pardoned by the Crown in March 1377 after Gaunt gained power after the death of his brother the Black Prince who had been the moving force behind the reforms of the Good Parliament.

In August 1376 the election of the Common Council was changed from being ward based to being based on the guilds gave the Common Council greater share in City government and prohibited Aldermen from standing for election the year after holding office which was supported by the lesser trades grouped around John of Northampton.

=== The Gaunt supremacy ===
Partly because of his support for John Wycliffe during which the Bishop of London, William Courtenay, was publicly threatened by Gaunt there were riots against John of Gaunt in 1377. A more substantive reason for the riots was an attempt by Gaunt in the Bad Parliament to replace the authority of the mayor with that of a captain appointed by the crown.

Gaunt insisted that Adam Stable, the mayor elected under the new and more democratic rules, be deposed. To placate Gaunt and to avoid a royally appointed captain in the aftermath of the riots, Stable was replaced with Nicholas Brembre who as a rich merchant was seen as more acceptable to Gaunt. Brembre was sworn in the same day as Stable was deposed. Ironically like his immediate successor John Philipot Brembre ended in the anti-Gaunt faction while those representing the "lesser trades" would become pro-Gaunt. The weakness of government and uncertainty about future direction meant that the City of London was unusually important compared to immediately earlier and later times.

Edward III died on 21 June 1377 and an influential deputation was sent to the new king Richard II and Joan of Kent his mother asking Richard to reconcile the City with the Duke of Lancaster.

In an attempt to preserve London's autonomy in late 1377 new charter for London was agreed. However a few months later there was a resurgence of mob violence against a king's uncle when a mob broke into the London home of Thomas of Woodstock which led to the charter's revocation.

In 1378 the wool merchant John Philipot fitted out at his own expense a small anti piracy naval squadron and captured the son of the pirate John Mercer which made him popular with the public. This very popularity made him unpopular with the nobles around John of Gaunt with Hugh Stafford, one of the Lords liaising with the Commons in the 1378 Parliament attempted to censure Philipot for mobilising a fleet without Crown approval - although Philipot replied that if the nobles had not left the country exposed to invasion he would never have interfered.

=== The clash of the greater and lesser trades ===
The anti-Gaunt fishmonger William Walworth held the mayoralty during the Peasants' revolt, and the decisive actions of this faction against Wat Tyler and the rebel army and in support of the Crown gained considerable favour with Richard II, including knighthoods. (Note: Those knighted were the Mayor William Walworth and four aldermen, John Philpot, Nicholas Brembre, Nicholas Twyford and Robert Launde. The only other Londoners knighted in the century were Richard de Refham around 1312 and Mayor John de Pulteney in 1337; after 1381, the next Londoner knighted was William Estfield nearly 60 years later, in 1439.) Also in the revolt, which was itself strongly hostile to Gaunt, Lyons was executed by the mob.

After the destruction of tax records following the Peasants Revolt, money was becoming an important issue and extraordinary taxes were proposed mostly through customs, with the 1382 Parliament asking that these be managed by a committee of prominent merchants half from London, increasing London's weight in the national political community.

In 1381 John Northampton, the leader of the lesser trades who had become friendly to Gaunt, held the mayoralty for two terms with the king writing to Londoners to back his re-election in 1382. Northampton managed to put an end to the fishmongers' monopoly, which although this was partially reversed when Brembre returned, Brembre still refused to fully restore the monopoly.

=== Brembre's rule ===
Brembre got the mayoralty back in 1383 with the king's support (partly because he owed Brembre money) and with force on both his side and Northampton's. According to a petition to the 1386 Parliament he had "secured the mayoralty by violence and by assembling a large body of supporters”. (Note: "ove forte main … et gñt multitude des gentz … feust fait maire", (Great Britain. Parliament 1767, p. 226) according to (Round 1886)) The nineteenth century constitutional authority William Stubbs said that this forcible election had "the importance of a constitutional episode." (Note: (Stubbs 1904, pp. 594–595), although (Round 1886) says that the election of 1386 that he refers to should be 1384)

Brembre had Northampton arrested on charges of sedition on 7 February 1384, and provoking a series of shop closures by supporters in the city on the 11th, which Brembre treated this as an insurrection and had one of the organisers John Constantine summarily executed.

Brembre's 1384 re-election was opposed by the goldsmith and future mayor Nicholas Twyford, who although not fully part of Northampton's faction was closer to closer to Northampton than to the victuallers. Brembre concealed armed men in London Guildhall while Richard had ensured that there was a general disarmament in London for the election for the election which meant that Twyford's supporters could be chased out. (Note: According to the original Anglo-Norman French of the petition: sailleront sur eux oue graunt noise criantz tuwez tuwez lour pursuiantz hydousement, (Round 1886) "the aforesaid armed men sprang out upon them with a great noise shouting 'Slaughter! Slaughter!', threateningly chasing them". In the same 2004 edition of the Oxford Dictionary of National Biography the article on Brember says that this was against Twyford in 1384 (Prescott 2004) while the article on Northampton says it was against Northampton in 1383 (Strohm 2004)) In 1384 Brembre also accused his rival John Northampton of sedition, although the death sentence was commuted to ten years with Northampton remaining a presence in London politics. 1384 also saw the election of the common council reverted to election by territorial wards rather than craft guilds, which favoured richer merchants.

Brembre was succeeded as Mayor by his ally, the fishmonger Nicholas Exton, in October 1386. Within the first few weeks of his term, on the City's behalf he made a loan to the crown of the sizeable sum of £4,000 partially repayable out of the money from the wool subsidy. The book of records of Northampton's reform legislation, the Jubilee Book, was burned by the then mayor Nicholas Exton in March 1387.

Brembre became a very close and trusted ally of Richard during Richard's attempts to escape limits on his rule, even after the Lords Appellant who had taken over effective government of the country. In 1387 Brembre attempted to get Londoners to swear oaths for Richard and raise troops in London against the Lords Appellant, but the City authorities under Exton, who although he was also favoured by the Crown was more equivocal in his support for Richard, refused to help raise an army and let Lords Appellant into London. Brembre, abandoned by his allies, was executed by the Merciless Parliament in 1388.

=== Post Brembre period ===
Nicholas Twyford became mayor in 1388. Richard II advised London to choose as mayor someone "trusty and loyal" —by which, of course, the King meant, loyal to him. However, the actual election of Nicholas Twyford was probably displeasing to Richard as although never a supporter of John Northampton the tribune of the lesser trades, Twyford had regularly been opposed to Exton. The Merciless Parliament held that year also, finally, stripped London of its right to monopolize the retail sale of goods. The next year the grocer William Venour became mayor, although there was contention with many citizens calling for Adam Bamme instead. Bamme did succeed Vemour in 1390 and during his first term negotiated the purchase of a very large quantity of grain which were sold on at fixed prices to those in need during national food shortages. This act was quite popular with the city's citizens, and helped gain Bamme a second term in 1397. There was also after the time of Brembre's execution a reluctance to loan money to the King, which led to tension between the King and the City.

In January 1392 as a result of the City authorities insisting on their sole right of arrest Richard ordered the Mayor to appear before him every day for a week or to forfeit a bond of £1,000. A few weeks later a a riot broke out in Fleet Street targeting the Lord High Treasurer, John Waltham, led to the mayor of London being summoned with other leading citizens to Richard in Nottingham Castle where the mayor and sheriffs were imprisoned and deposed although one of the sheriffs, John Shadworth did resist longer than others. There was later an inquiry into London's "misgovernment". This led to London losing its charter and thus its ability to self govern and Richard appointed a warden instead of a Lord Mayor.

Even after London's liberties and mayoral elections were restored, Richard still felt confident enough to appoint Richard Whittington as mayor when Adam Bamme died rather than let Londoners elect a replacement. Whittington then negotiated for London to repurchase its own liberties for £10,000.

London at the start of the fifteenth century settled into a more stable rule.

== Factions ==
=== The Vintners ===
In the mid-1370s John of Gaunt was associated with wealthy financiers such as Richard Lyons who with Adam Bury and John Pecche had a monopoly on the sale of sweet wine in the city. The members tended to have strong personal links to John of Gaunt. This monopoly was opposed by other merchants who would become the dominant "greater guilds" and condemned by the reformist Good Parliament of 1376, and who completely lost all hope of power after the execution of Lyons in the Peasants Revolt.

=== Greater Guilds ===
Historians have long debated the true nature of this faction’s interests—whether they represented the victualling trades, driven by immediate concerns over maintaining privileges over London food supply, or a merchant-capitalist interest intent on furthering their interests in international trade and lending money to the government. The faction had its strength among the greater guilds and more prosperous merchants, especially "victuallers" who supplied food to London, such as the then dominant grocers and the fishmongers. "Victuallers" was a pejorative term. associating the party with the then-high price of food in London; historian Barbara Hanawalt describes it as being part of a smear campaign.

The fishmongers had a valuable monopoly on supply of fish to the city that was resented by the other citizens. The factions' aim was to strengthen the existing oligarchy by depriving the lesser guilds of any voice in the city, and was consequently favourable to Richard's policy. It was generally hostile to John of Gaunt. Prominent members included William Walworth, Nicholas Brembre, John Philipot, Nicholas Exton, William Venour, John Fressh, John Hadle and later Richard Whittington.

The dominance at various times was evidenced by the fact that at the 1383 election there were sixteen aldermen who belonged to the Grocers' Company.

They could be seen as a merchant capitalist party in city politics. The two groups were roughly aligned along guild lines, with Brembre representing the non-productive victualling guilds―who made money from trade rather than goods―against the artisanal labouring guilds, (Note: The Marxist economic historian Rodney Hilton has described how "the manipulation involved in buying the product cheap from the artisan and selling dear on the market was not strictly analogous to the exercises of non-economic coercion by the landowner to extract feudal rent from the peasant, but it created similar antagonisms".) The group effectively controlled city government, and historian Pamela Nightingale has argued that "because the merchant-capitalists were most strongly represented in the grocers' and fishmongers' companies, the conflict took on the appearance of victualler against non-victualler".

=== Lesser Trades ===
The lesser trades have been portrayed as the party of the master craftsmen who wanted to break the virtual monopoly of city offices of the merchants in the Greater Guilds. and tended to be in craft guilds such as the cordwainers and butchers that weren't in the Great Companies and were far more likely to be tradesmen rather than merchants. They sought open civic markets and wider participation in London’s trade. This was led by John Northampton and in the 1370s opposed the dominance of the Gaunt supported Lyons faction but in the 1380s won Gaunt's support.

In the 1360s and early 1370s Northampton was arrested a number of times with the last incident in 1371 resulting in the mayor, aldermen and leading men from the guilds being summoned by Edward III to swear to keep the peace being arrested alongside other political figures such as John Hadle and John More and being imprisoned in the Tower of London. The disturbance may have been coordinated with disturbances at the same time among merchants in Norwich and the involvement of the royal, rather than the City of London, authorities was unusual and points to a national political dispute.

Northampton became a reformist Lord Mayor of London in 1381 and 1382, during dissension in favour of reform of its Common Council in the early years of Richard II's reign. When the anti-Gaunt faction were able to engineer Northampton's overthrow, even the book of records of reform legislation was burned, known as the Jubilee Book. The radical movements' mob politics heightened public reluctance to permit people's engagement in politics.

Due to intermittent support from John of Gaunt this faction was in the nineteenth and early twentieth century often portrayed as also supporting John Wycliffe due to Gaunt's patronage of Wycliffe, clashes with the Bishop of London and desire to take church land. However Northampton was a devout Catholic rather than a Lollard.

== Issues ==
=== Wool Trade ===
The victualers tended to be involved in the wool trade particularly at the Calais Staple. This would tend to make them both less belligerent than both lesser trades and the magnates, while also more sympathetic to the need for a stronger military to protect trade.

=== Lending to the Crown ===
The government in war, particularly since the bankruptcy of many Italian bankers due to Edward III's default, was dependent on loans from the City as a body or from individual wealthy merchants. This meant that many of the leaders of the victuallers were strongly royalist as they had often leant large amounts to the King, something made easier through their control of the wool subsidy which gave income to repay loans. Brembre in particular organised large corporate loans from the city to the Crown, beginning Richard's reign with one of £10000 (equivalent to £9,867,600 in 2025) and one in 1378 of £5000 (equivalent to £4,933,800 in 2025).

The periodic refusal of the City to loan funds to the crown was often a source of conflict with Richard.

== Historiography ==
George Unwin in 1908 posited the idea that the conflict between the guilds was a conflict between victualling and non-victualling guilds about whether the food trade should be controlled. Ruth Bird in 1949 maintained that the guild conflicts were a class conflict between small masters and Craftsmen against the dominant merchant-capitalists. This class based analysis tied in with later work by Barrie Dobson on English provincial town risings during the Peasants' Revolt.

== Sources ==
- Barron, Caroline M (1999). "Richard II and London". In Goodman, A.; Gillespie, J. L. (eds.). Richard II: The Art of Kingship. Oxford: Clarendon Press. pp. 129–154. ISBN 0-19-820189-3.
- Barron, C. M. (2000). "London 1300–1540". In Palliser, D. M.; Clark, P.; Daunton, M. J. (eds.). Cambridge Urban History of Britain 600-1540. Vol. I. Cambridge: Cambridge University Press. pp. 395–400. ISBN 978-1-10871-611-6.
- Barron, C. M. (2002). "Chivalry, Pageantry and Merchant Culture in Medieval London". In Coss, P. R. & Keen, M. (eds.). Heraldry, Pageantry and Social Display in Medieval England. Woodbridge: Boydell. pp. 219–242. ISBN 978-1-84383-036-8.
- Barron, C. M. (2005). London in the Later Middle Ages: Government and People 1200–1500. Oxford: Oxford University Press. ISBN 978-0-19928-441-2.
- Bird, R. (1949). The Turbulent London of Richard II. London: Longman. OCLC 644424997.
- Bolton, J. L. (1986). "The City and the Crown 1456–61". The London Journal: A Review of Metropolitan Society Past and Present. 12. OCLC 993072319.
- Carlson, D. (2004). Chaucer's Jobs. Basingstoke: Macmillan. ISBN 978-1-13703-914-9.
- Castor, Helen (2024). The Eagle and the Hart: The Tragedy of Richard II and Henry IV.
- Cohn, Samuel K. (2013). Popular Protest in Late Medieval English Towns. Cambridge: Cambridge University Press. ISBN 978-1-107-02780-0.
- Coleman, O. (1969). "The Collectors of Customs in London under Richard II". In Hollaender, A. E. J.; Kellaway, W. (eds.). Studies in London History Presented to Philip E. Jones. London: Hodder and Stoughton. pp. 181–194. OCLC 220501191.
- Dobson, R. B. (1984). "The Risings in York, Beverley and Scarborough, 1380–1381". In Hilton, R. H.; Aston, T. H. (eds.). The English Rising of 1381. Cambridge: Cambridge University Press. pp. 112–142.
- Duls, L. D. (1975). Richard II in the Early Chronicles. The Hague: Walter De Gruyter Inc. ISBN 902793326X.
- Gardner, John (1999). The Life and Times of Chaucer. New York: Barnes & Noble Books. ISBN 978-0-7607-1281-8. OCLC 41571383.
- Given-Wilson, C.; Brand, P.; Phillips, S.; Ormrod, M.; Martin, G.; Curry, A.; Horrox, R., eds. (2005b). "Introduction: Richard II: October 1386". British History Online. Parliament Rolls of Medieval England. Woodbridge.
- Goodman, A. (1971). The Loyal Conspiracy: The Lords Appellant Under Richard II. London: University of Miami Press. ISBN 0870242156.
- Hanawalt, B. (2017). Ceremony and Civility: Civic Culture in Late Medieval London. Oxford: Oxford University Press. ISBN 978-0-19049-043-0.
- Hatfield, Emma (2015). London's Lord Mayors: 800 Years of Shaping the City.
- Herbert, William (1836). The History of the Twelve Great Livery Companies of London. Self published.
- Hicks, M. A. (2002). The Wars of the Roses. Totton: Yale University Press. ISBN 978-0-30018157-9.
- Hilton, R. (July 1990). Class Conflict and the Crisis of Feudalism: Essays in Medieval Social History (2nd rev. ed.). London: Verso. ISBN 978-0-86091-998-8.
- Herbert, William (1834). The History of the Twelve Great Livery Companies of London. Vol. 1. London: William Herbert.
- Holmes, George (1975). The Good Parliament. Oxford, England: Clarendon Press. ISBN 019822446X.
- Mortimer, I. (2008). The Fears of Henry IV: The Life of England's Self-Made King. London: Vintage. ISBN 978-1844135295.
- Nightingale, P. (1989). "Capitalists, Crafts and Constitutional Change in Late Fourteenth-Century London". Past & Present. 124: 3–35. doi:10.1093/past/124.1.3.
- Norton, George (1829). Commentaries on the History, Constitution, & Chartered Franchises of the City of London.
- Oliver, C. (2010). Parliament and Political Pamphleteering in Fourteenth-century England. Woodbridge: Boydell & Brewer. ISBN 978-1-90315-331-4.
- Prescott, A. (1981). "London and the Peasants' Revolt: A Portrait Gallery". The London Journal: A Review of Metropolitan Society Past and Present. 7. OCLC 993072319.
- Postan, M. M. (1972). The Medieval Economy and Society (repr. ed.). London: Penguin. OCLC 7113198358.
- Rawcliffe, Carole (1993). "SHADWORTH, John (d.1430), of London". History of Parliament.
- Round, John Horace (1886). "Brembre, Nicholas" . In Stephen, Leslie (ed.). Dictionary of National Biography. Vol. 6. London: Smith, Elder & Co.
- Saul, Nigel (1997). Richard II. London: Yale University Press. ISBN 0-300-07003-9.
- Steel, A. (1974). "The Collectors of the Customs in the Reign of Richard II". In Hearder, H.; Loyn, H. R. (eds.). British Government and Administration: Studies Presented to S. B. Chrimes. Cardiff: University of Wales Press. pp. 27–39. ISBN 0708305385.
- Stubbs, William (1904). Constitutional History. Vol. 3 (fifth ed.).
- Sumption, Jonathan (2009). Divided Houses: Hundred Years War III. Vol. 3. London: Faber & Faber. ISBN 978-0-57124-012-8.
- Thompson, Edward Maunde, ed. (1874). Chronicon Angliæ, 1328–1388 (in Latin). London: Longman & Co.; Trübner.
- Thrupp, Sylvia L. (1989). The Merchant Class of Medieval London, 1300–1500. Ann Arbor: University of Michigan Press. ISBN 0472060724. OCLC 18559941.
- Unwin, George (1908). The gilds and companies of London.
- Wagner, J. (2006). Encyclopedia of the Hundred Years War (PDF). Westport, CT: Greenwood Press. ISBN 978-0-3133-2736-0. Archived from the original (PDF) on 16 July 2018.
- Workman, H. B. (1926). John Wyclif: A Study of the English Medieval Church. Vol. I. Oxford: Clarendon. OCLC 769417789.
- Rotuli Parliamentorum; ut et petitiones, et placita in Parliamento (in Anglo-Norman and Latin). Vol. 3. London: Record Commission / Great Britain Parliament. 1767. OCLC 695983551.

=== Oxford Dictionary of National Biography ===
- Prescott, Andrew (23 September 2004). "Brembre, Sir Nicholas". Oxford Dictionary of National Biography (online ed.). Oxford University Press. (Subscription, Wikipedia Library access or UK public library membership required.)
- Strohm, P. (2004a). "Exton, Nicholas (d. 1402)". Oxford Dictionary of National Biography (online ed.). Oxford University Press. doi:10.1093/ref:odnb/52173. (Subscription, Wikipedia Library access or UK public library membership required.)
- Axworthy, Roger L. (2004). "Lyons, Richard (d.1381), Oxford Dictionary of National Biography". Oxford Dictionary of National Biography (online ed.). Oxford University Press. doi:10.1093/ref:odnb/52191. (Subscription, Wikipedia Library access or UK public library membership required.)
- Strohm, Paul (2004). "Northampton [Comberton], John". Oxford Dictionary of National Biography (online ed.). Oxford University Press. doi:10.1093/ref:odnb/20322. (Subscription, Wikipedia Library access or UK public library membership required.)
- Nightingale, Pamela (2004a). "Philipot, Sir John". Oxford Dictionary of National Biography (online ed.). Oxford University Press. (Subscription, Wikipedia Library access or UK public library membership required.)
- Rawcliffe, Carole (2004). "Stafford, Hugh, second earl of Stafford". Oxford Dictionary of National Biography (online ed.). Oxford University Press. (Subscription, Wikipedia Library access or UK public library membership required.)
- Strohm, Paul (2004b). "Twyford, Sir Nicholas". Oxford Dictionary of National Biography (online ed.). Oxford University Press. (Subscription, Wikipedia Library access or UK public library membership required.)
- Nightingale, Pamela (23 September 2004). "Walworth, Sir William". Oxford Dictionary of National Biography (online ed.). Oxford University Press. (Subscription, Wikipedia Library access or UK public library membership required.)
- Sutton, Anne F. (2017). "Whittington, Richard [Dick]". Oxford Dictionary of National Biography (online ed.). Oxford University Press. (Subscription, Wikipedia Library access or UK public library membership required.)
