= John Philipot (MP) =

English merchant and alderman of London (died 1384)

Sir John Philipot
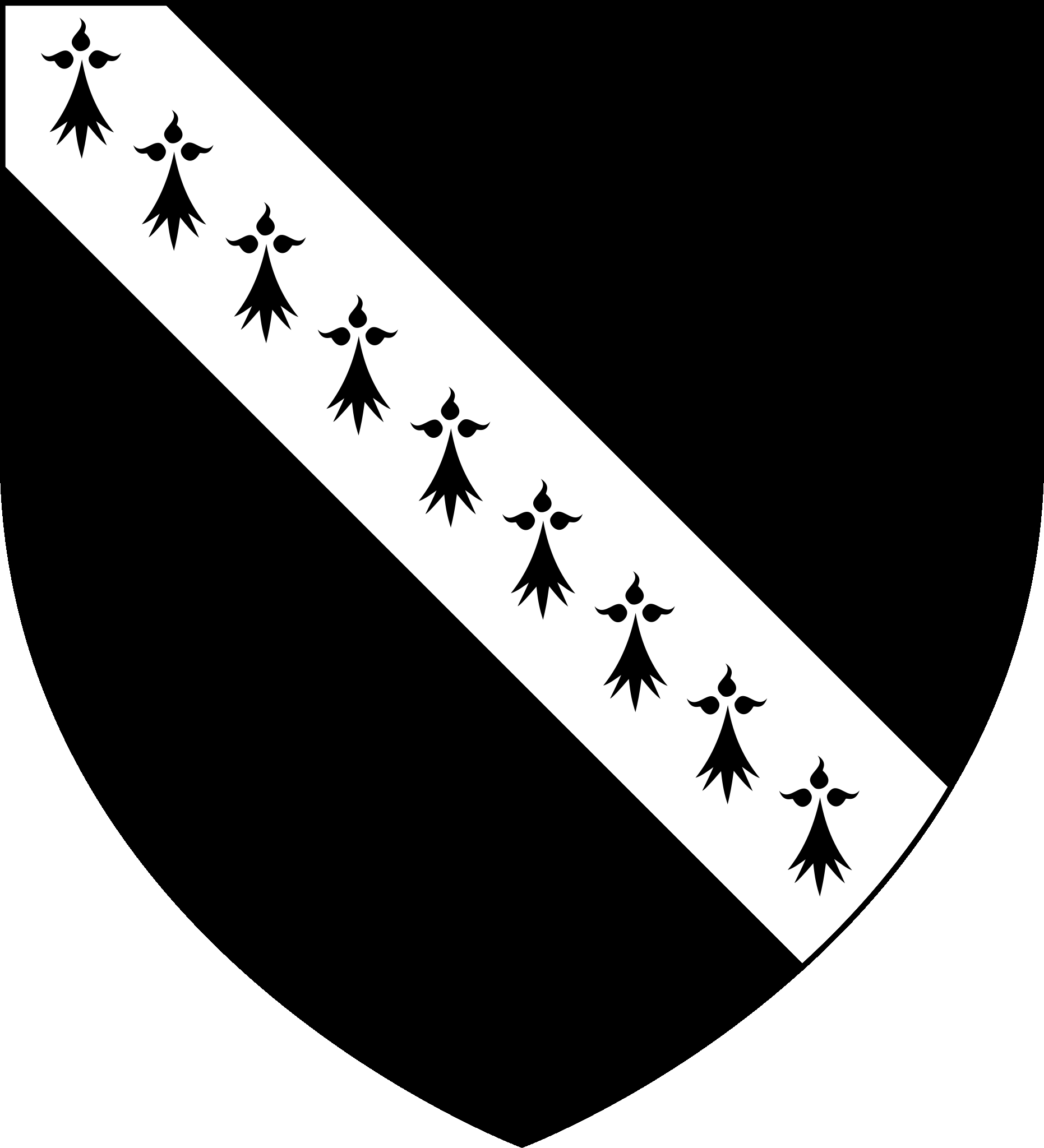
- Arms of Philipot: Sable, a bend ermine.

Lord Mayor of London
- In office 1378–1379
- Preceded by: Nicholas Brembre
- Succeeded by: John Hadle

Personal details
- Died: 1384

Sir John Philipot (Note: The name is also spelt Phelipot or Philpot.) (died 1384) was an English merchant and alderman of London. He was a member of the Grocers' Company, served as MP for London in 1371 and 1381, headed the opposition to John of Gaunt during the minority of Richard II, was appointed joint-treasurer for the war with France in 1377 at the request of the Commons, was Lord Mayor of London in 1378, and assisted Richard II during the Peasants' Revolt of 1381. Philpot Lane in London is named after him.

== Origins ==
John Philipot was no doubt a native of Kent, but the statement of Heath that he was born at Upton Court in the parish of Sibertswold or Shebbertswell, near Dover, cannot be correct, though the estate was held by his descendants. He bore the same arms—sable, a bend ermine—as the Philipots of Philpotts, near Tunbridge. His first wife brought him the manor of the Grench (Grange) at Gillingham, near Chatham.

== Reign of Edward III ==
Philipot became a member of the Grocers' Company of London, one of whose earliest members was a Phelypot Farnham, and he soon accumulated considerable wealth. Edward III gave him the wardship of the heir of Sir Robert de Ogle in 1362, appointed him in the following year a receiver of forfeitures on merchandise at Calais, and in 1364 licensed him to export thither wheat and other victuals. Philipot lent the King money and acted as his paymaster. He sat for London in the parliament of February 1371, in which the clerical ministers were removed, and in the great council summoned in June to remedy the miscalculations of their successors. In 1372 after the defeat at La Rochelle left English wool exports undefended, with Nicholas Brembre he was simultaneously elected one of the two Sheriffs of the City of London and an Alderman.

In the crisis after the Good Parliament, Philipot, with Nicholas Brembre, a fellow-grocer, and also connected with Kent, and William Walworth, headed the opposition of the ruling party in London to John of Gaunt, Duke of Lancaster. On the collapse of the Good Parliament the Duke of Lancaster proposed in the Bad Parliament which he packed in January 1377 to replace the mayor by a captain, and give the Marshal of England power of arrest within the city (19 February). Philipot is said to have risen and declared that the city would never submit to such an infraction of its liberties; but this must be a mistake, as he did not sit in this parliament. The proposal, coupled with the insult inflicted on the Bishop of London William Courtenay by Gaunt and the Marshal Henry Percy at the trial of John Wicliffe a few hours later, provoked a riot the following day, forcing Lancaster and Percy to flee for their lives. Lancaster failed to prevent the deputation of the citizens, headed by Philipot, from obtaining an interview with the old King, who heard their explanations and gave them a gracious answer. But the Duke was implacable, and the city officers sought to appease him by a somewhat humiliating reparation. The citizens as a body, however, would have nothing to do with it, and though the King, at Lancaster's instigation, turned out the mayor Adam Stable, they at once (21 March) chose Brembre in his stead.

== Reign of Richard II ==
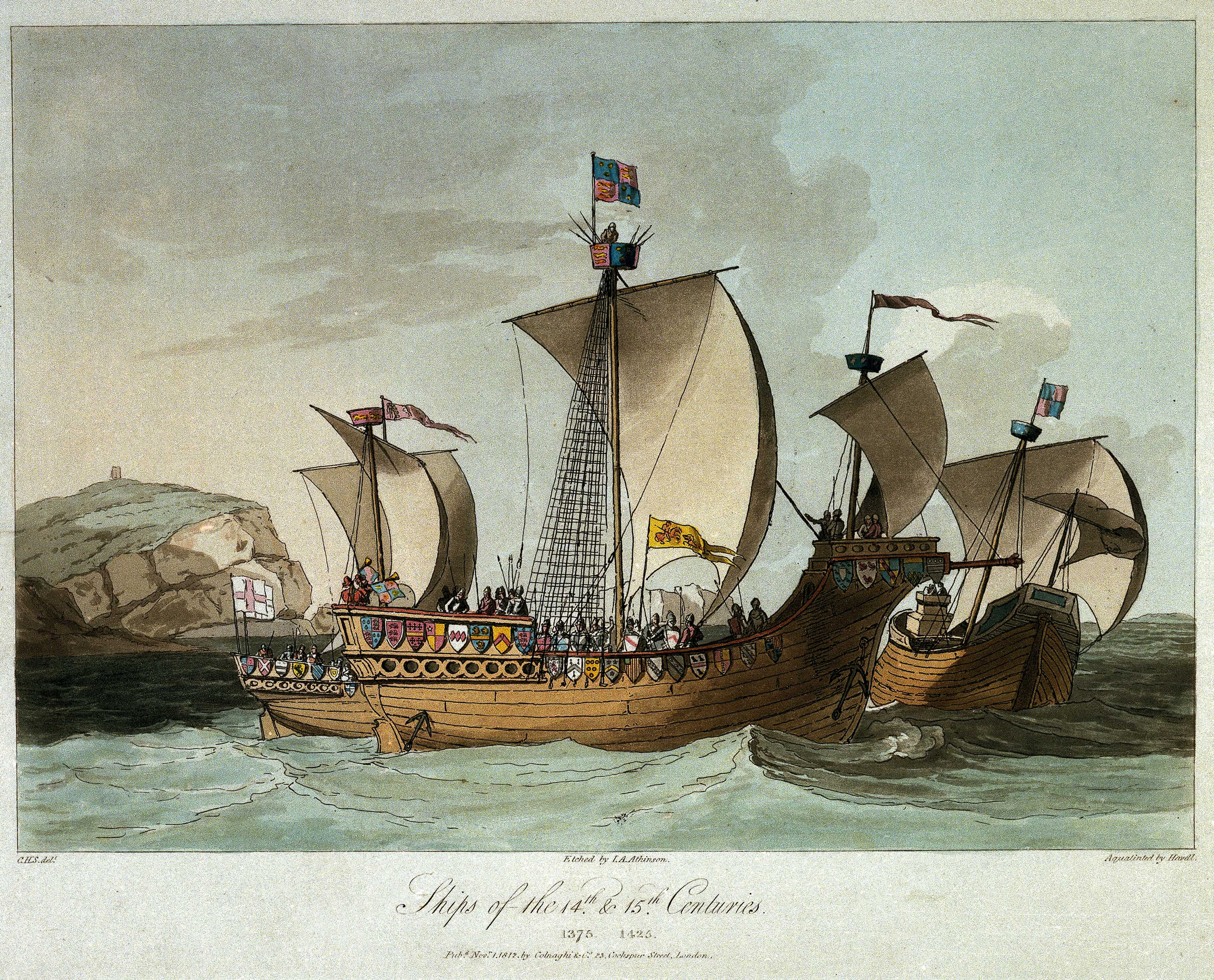
English ships of the 14th & 15th centuries, 1375, 1425

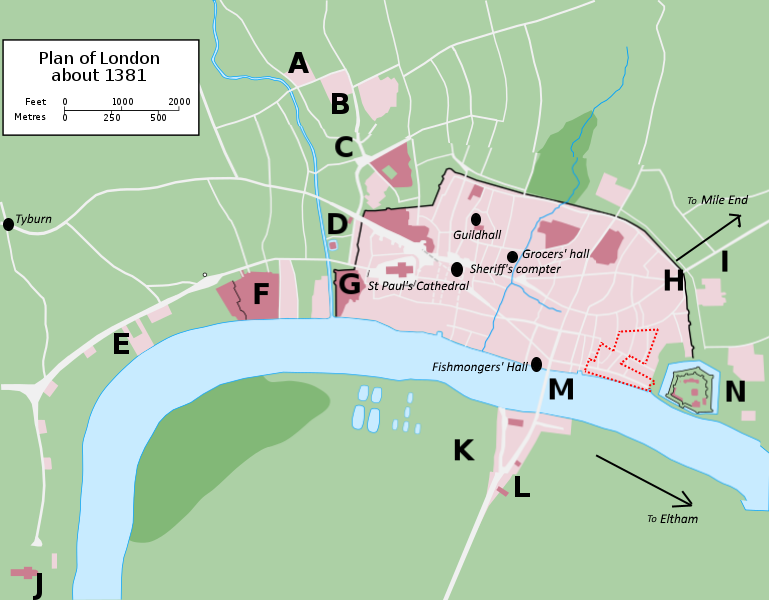
Plan of London about 1381

As soon as news of Edward III's death, on 21 June 1377, reached the city, an influential deputation was sent to the young prince Richard II and Joan of Kent his mother. Philipot acted as spokesman assuring him of the loyalty of the city, and begged him to reconcile them with the Duke of Lancaster. The triumph of the principles of the Good Parliament in the first parliament of the new reign was marked by the appointment in October 1377 of Philipot and Walworth, at the request of the commons, to be treasurers of the moneys granted for the war with France. They and other London merchants lent the king 10,000l. on the security of three crowns and other royal jewels.

In 1378 Philipot fitted out at his own expense a small anti piracy naval squadron and captured the son of the pirate John Mercer which made him popular with the public. This very popularity made him unpopular with the nobles around John of Gaunt with Hugh Stafford, one of the Lords liaising with the Commons in the 1378 Parliament attempted to censure Philipot for mobilising a fleet without Crown approval - although Philipot replied that if the nobles had not left the country exposed to invasion he would never have interfered. At the height of his popularity he was chosen mayor for 1378–9, and filled the office with his usual activity and generosity. He had the city ditch cleaned out, levying a rate of fivepence per household for the purpose, and enforced order and justice so admirably that his measures were taken as a precedent nearly forty years later.

Lord Beauchamp of Bletsho in December 1379 appointed Philipot one of his executors, bequeathing him 'my great cup gilt which the King of Navarre gave me'. In the year after his mayoralty he earned the effusive gratitude of the city by defraying the cost of one of two stone towers, sixty feet high, built below London Bridge, between which a chain was suspended across the river to assure the safety of the city and shipping against possible French attacks. He was a member of the commission appointed in March of that year, at the request of the Commons, to inquire how far the heavy taxation could be lightened by greater economy in administration. He may have sat in this parliament, but the London writs are wanting. In the summer he provided ships for the Earl of Buckingham's expedition to Brittany; and when the delay in starting forced many to pledge their armour, Philipot, as the St. Albans chronicler heard from his own lips, redeemed no fewer than a thousand jacks. It was to him that the intercepted correspondence of Sir Ralph Ferrers with the French was brought, and Ferrers being with John of Gaunt in the north, Philipot journeyed thither and saw him safely interned in Durham Castle.

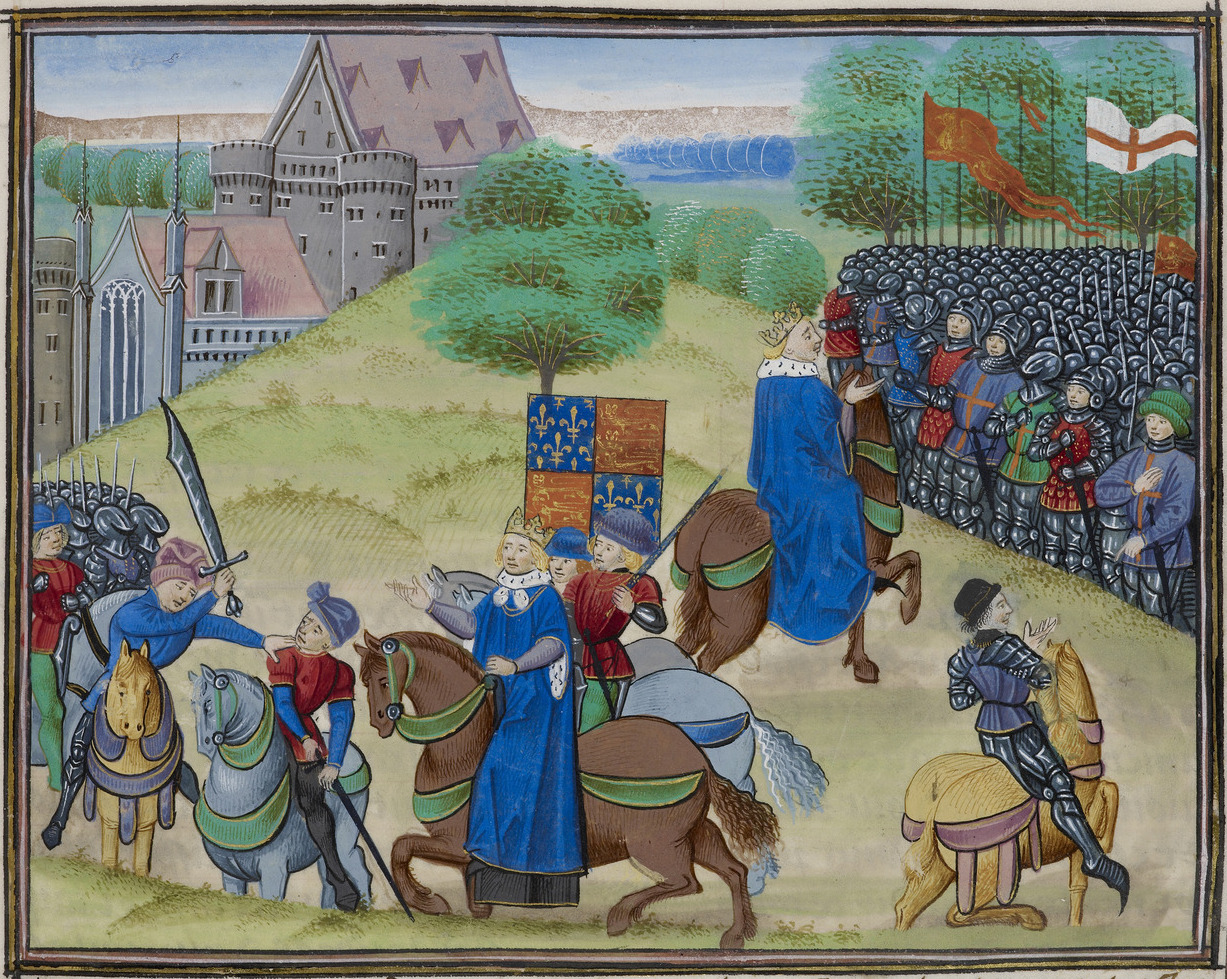
Depiction of the death of Wat Tyler, Froissart's Chronicles, c. 1475–83

At the crisis of the Peasants' Revolt, in June 1381, Philipot came with Mayor Walworth to the young King Richard's assistance, and Walworth having slain Tyler in Smithfield, he and four other aldermen were knighted with Walworth on the spot. (Note: With Philipot were the Mayor William Walworth and three other aldermen, Nicholas Brembre, Nicholas Twyford and Robert Launde. The only other Londoners knighted in the century were Richard de Refham around 1312 and Mayor John de Pulteney in 1337; after 1381, the next Londoner knighted was William Estfield nearly 60 years later, in 1439.) He was granted an augmentation of his coat-armour; and it may have been now that Richard gave him an estate of 40l. a year. In November he again represented London in parliament. Filling the same position in the May parliament of the next year, Philipot was put on a committee of merchants to consider the proposed loan for the King's expedition to France, and was appointed a 'receiver and guardian' of the tonnage and poundage appropriated to the keeping of the sea. But John of Northampton, who was now mayor and busy depressing the influence of the greater companies, had him deposed from his office of alderman. In the spring and summer of 1383 Philipot carried out the transport arrangements for Bishop Spencer and his crusaders, and sat for London in the October parliament.

== Death and legacy ==
He died in the summer of 1384, 'not leaving his like behind in zeal for the king and the realm', and was buried with (probably his second) wife before the entrance into the choir of the Greyfriars Church (now Christ Church), London. He left his manor at Gillingham to his second son, whose son John exchanged it, in 1433, for Twyford, Middlesex, with Richard, son of Adam Bamme, mayor of London in 1391 and 1397. A chapel which Philipot built there was used as a barn in Hasted's time, and is figured in the Bibliotheca Topographica Britannica. His house in London was in Langbourne Ward, on the site of the present Philpot Lane, which was named after him. He bequeathed lands to the city of London for the relief of thirteen poor people for ever.

Philipot was at least twice married—to Marjery Croydon, daughter of Richard Croydon, alderman of London, who brought him the manor at Gillingham; and to Jane Stamford. His third wife was the widow Margaret Berlingham. Hasted mentions two sons. A daughter, Margaret Philpot, married, first, T. Santlor, and, secondly, John Neyland, and dying after 1399, was buried in the church of the Greyfriars. Descendants of his dwelt at Upton Court, Sibertswold, near Dover, until the reign of Henry VII.

Coat of arms of Sir John Philipot
Notes (1 & 4) augmentation of honour granted by Richard II to Sir John Philipot; (2 & 3) arms of Philipot Escutcheon Quarterly, (1 & 4) gules, a cross between 4 swords erect argent hilted or; (2 & 3) sable, a bend ermine

== See also ==
- City of London (Parliament of England constituency)
- List of lord mayors of London
- List of parliaments of England#Parliaments of Edward III
- List of parliaments of England#Parliaments of Richard II
- Parliament of England#14th century

== Sources ==
- Barron, C. M. (2002). "Chivalry, Pageantry and Merchant Culture in Medieval London". In Coss, P. R. & Keen, M. (eds.). Heraldry, Pageantry and Social Display in Medieval England. Woodbridge: Boydell. pp. 219–242. ISBN 978-1-84383-036-8.
- Devon, Frederick (1835). Issue Roll of Thomas de Brantingham. London: John Rodwell. p. 145.
- Devon, Frederick (1836). Issues of the Exchequer; … From King Henry III to King Henry VI Inclusive. Pell Records. London: John Murray. pp. lvi, 194, 208, 222.
- Dugdale, William (1676). The Baronage of England. Vol. 2. London: Tho[mas] Newcomb. p. 262.
- Fabyan, Robert (1811). Ellis, Henry (ed.). The New Chronicles of England and France, in Two Parts. London. p. 531.
- Gairdner, James, ed. (1876). The Historical Collections of a Citizen of London in the Fifteenth Century. Westminster: Camden Society. p. 254.
- Hasted, Edward (1798). The History and Topographical Survey of the County of Kent. Vol. 4. 2nd ed. Canterbury: W. Bristow. pp. 236–239.
- Hasted, Edward (1798). The History and Topographical Survey of the County of Kent. Vol. 5. 2nd ed. Canterbury: W. Bristow. p. 224.
- Hasted, Edward (1800). The History and Topographical Survey of the County of Kent. Vol. 9. 2nd ed. Canterbury: W. Bristow. p. 377.
- Heath, John Benjamin (1829). Some Account of the Worshipful Company of Grocers of the City of London. London. pp. 47, 56, 182–184.
- Nicolas, Nicholas Harris (1826). Testamenta Vetusta. Vol. 1. London: Nichols and Son. p. 104.
- Nightingale, Pamela (2004). "Philipot, Sir John (d. 1384), merchant and alderman of London". Oxford Dictionary of National Biography (online ed.). Oxford University Press. doi:10.1093/ref:odnb/22107. (Subscription, Wikipedia Library access or UK public library membership required.)
- Rawcliffe, Carole (2004). "Stafford, Hugh, second earl of Stafford". Oxford Dictionary of National Biography (online ed.). Oxford University Press. (Subscription, Wikipedia Library access or UK public library membership required.)
- Riley, Henry Thomas, ed. (1859). Liber Albus. Munimenta Gildiiallae Londoniensis 1. London: Longman, Brown, Green, Longmans, and Roberts. pp. 522, 682.
- Riley, Henry Thomas, ed. (1868). Memorials of London and London Life, in the XIIIth, XIVth, and XVth Centuries. London: Longmans, Green, and Co. pp. 444, 451.
- Rymer, Thomas (1830). Fœdera. Vol. 3. Part 2. London: [publisher not identified]. pp. 693, 741, 1076.
- Rymer, Thomas (1869). Fœdera. Vol. 4. London: [publisher not identified]. pp. 31–32.
- Stow, John (1720). A Survey of the Cities of London and Westminster. Strype, John (ed.). London. Book 1, pp. 12, 261; Book 3, p. 133; Book 5, p. 114.
- Thompson, Edward Maunde, ed. (1874). Chronicon Angliæ, 1328–1388 (in Latin). London: Longman & Co.; Trübner.
- Walsingham, Thomas (1864). Historia Anglicana. Vol. 2. Riley, Henry Thomas (ed.). London: Longman, Green, Longman, Roberts, and Green. p. 71.
- Members of Parliament: Return to Two Orders of the Honorable the House of Commons, Dated 4 May 1876 and 9 March 1877. Part 1. London, 1878 [Krause Reprint, 1980]. pp. 185–186, 196, 208, 218.
- Rotuli Parliamentorum, ut et Petitiones, et Placita in Parliamento Tempore Ricardi R. II. Vol. 3. [1771]. pp. 7, 34, 123–124, 373.

Attribution:

- This article incorporates text from a publication now in the public domain: Tait, James (1896). "Philipot, John (d.1384)". In Lee, Sidney (ed.). Dictionary of National Biography. Vol. 45. London: Smith, Elder & Co. pp. 159–161.
