= Nicholas Twyford =

Lord Mayor of London 1388-1389

Sir Nicholas Twyford

Lord Mayor of London
- In office 1388–1389
- Preceded by: Nicholas Exton
- Succeeded by: William Venour

Sheriff of London
- In office 1377–1378

Alderman of Coleman Street
- In office 1376–1390

Personal details
- Occupation: Goldsmith

Sir Nicholas Twyford (died 1390) was a goldsmith who served as Lord Mayor of London.

He was a warden of the Goldsmiths' Company and in 1360 became Goldsmith in Ordinary to King Edward III and also carried out work for Richard II and John of Gaunt. He was seen as the most prominent goldsmith of that generation giving him access to the royal court.

He was active in London politics, becoming an Alderman for Coleman Street in 1376 and during the reformist Good Parliament backed John Northampton's reforms to give greater power to the lesser trades. He became a Sherriff in 1377 but following a riot in Cheapside in March 1378 between Twyford's goldsmiths and the mayor Nicholas Brembre's Guild of Pepperers, he was dismissed by Brembre for attempting to prevent the arrest of one of the Goldsmiths involved in the riot, although he was immediately reinstated after a group of goldsmiths guaranteed a 500 mark bond.

With four colleagues, he was knighted by Richard II following the death of Wat Tyler at Smithfield in June 1381 with the Mayor William Walworth and three other aldermen, John Philpot, Nicholas Brembre and Robert Launde. London merchants, even wealthy ones, were rarely knighted in this period.

Twyford stood against Nicholas Brembre when he stood for re-election in 1384. There were two major factions at that time in London, the wealthier victuallers around Brembre who were close to the king and the lesser trades around John Northampton who were closer to John of Gaunt. Twyford wasn't fully part of either faction but was closer to Northampton's. Brembre secured his victory by concealing armed men in London Guildhall and Twyford's supporters were chased out.

He did replace Brembre's ally Nicholas Exton as mayor in 1388. Richard II advised London to choose as mayor someone "trusty and loyal" but Twyford's election may have displeased Richard as although never a supporter of John Northampton the tribune of the lesser trades, Twyford had regularly opposed Exton. The Merciless Parliament held that year also, finally, stripped London of its right to monopolize the retail sale of goods.

He was buried in the Goldsmith's guild church, St John Zachary in Maiden Lane, Covent Garden.

== Sources ==
- Barron, Caroline M (1999). "Richard II and London". In Goodman, A.; Gillespie, J. L. (eds.). Richard II: The Art of Kingship. Oxford: Clarendon Press. pp. 129–154. ISBN 0-19-820189-3.
- Barron, C. M. (2002). "Chivalry, Pageantry and Merchant Culture in Medieval London". In Coss, P. R. & Keen, M. (eds.). Heraldry, Pageantry and Social Display in Medieval England. Woodbridge: Boydell. pp. 219–242. ISBN 978-1-84383-036-8.
- Bird, R. (1949). The Turbulent London of Richard II. London: Longman. OCLC 644424997.
- Pollard, Albert Frederick (1899). "Twyford, Nicholas" . Dictionary of National Biography. London: Smith, Elder & Co.
- Prescott, Andrew (23 September 2004). "Brembre, Sir Nicholas". Oxford Dictionary of National Biography (online ed.). Oxford University Press. (Subscription, Wikipedia Library access or UK public library membership required.)
- Round, John Horace (1886). "Brembre, Nicholas" . In Stephen, Leslie (ed.). Dictionary of National Biography. Vol. 6. London: Smith, Elder & Co.
- Strohm, Paul (2004b). "Twyford, Sir Nicholas". Oxford Dictionary of National Biography (online ed.). Oxford University Press. (Subscription, Wikipedia Library access or UK public library membership required.)
