= William Walworth =

Mayor of London who killed Wat Tyler

Sir William Walworth
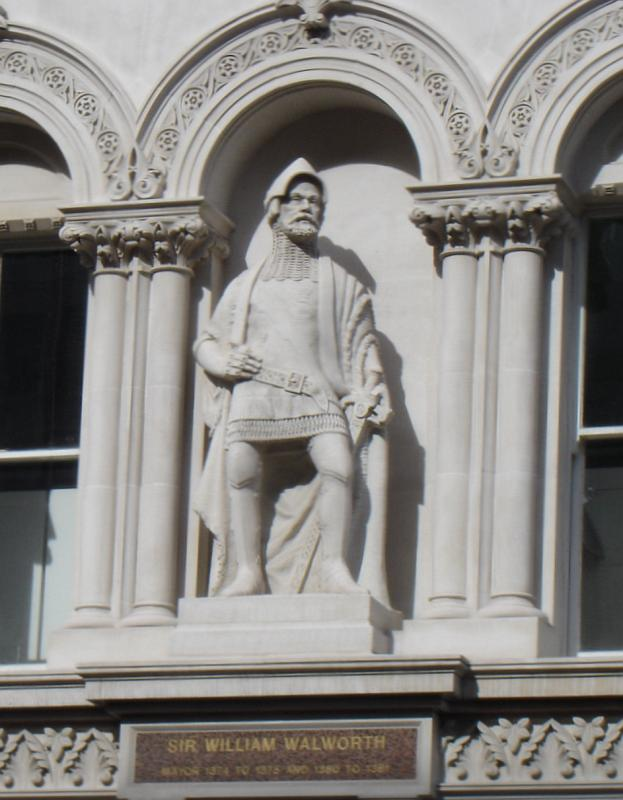
- Commemorative statue on Holborn Viaduct in London

23rd and 29th Lord Mayor of London
- In office 1374–1375
- Preceded by: Adam de Bury
- Succeeded by: John Warde
- In office 1380–1381
- Preceded by: John Hadle
- Succeeded by: John Northampton

Personal details
- Died: 1385

Sir William Walworth (died in 1385) was an English nobleman, politician, and a member of the Fishmonger's Guild in London. During his years as a political figure, he served twice as Lord Mayor of London (1374–75 and 1380–81) which led to much of his fame from today as the man who killed Wat Tyler (Leader of the Peasants' Revolt of 1381). This act was responsible for massively hindering the revolt.

== Career ==
=== Guild career ===
William Walworth was a member of the Fishmongers Guild in London before he entered politics. We know that he would have been well off due to this position as a fishmonger. A fishmonger is not someone who fishes, but rather, they are in control of the sale of fish which makes them comparable to a modern grocer. The guild had a monopoly on selling fish which would have proven to be lucrative for many. Additionally, because the medieval church did not allow eating meat on many Fridays of the year for fasting purposes, they would get significantly more sales on these days.

Walworth's career as a fishmonger is a setup for his life after. Here, he gained a lot of power as a successful merchant which would put him in a grey area between being upper class and lower class. There is not a clear way to describe who he was which complicates the traditional medieval narrative of the upper class vs. the lower class.

=== Political career ===
Walworth was an apprentice under John Lovekyn (also a member of the Fishmongers Guild) whom he succeeded as Alderman of Bridge ward in 1368 after his death. This opportunity allowed Walworth to gain power beyond his career as a fishmonger. One side effect of this was Walworth's marriage to Lovekyn's widow. Whether this was a financial decision or not is unclear, but this is a possibility due to their situations — she would have been left Lovekyn's business after his death and Walworth was a growing member of the economy who would seek to grasp an opportunity like that.

This rise in the ranks made him a more prominent figure in London politics. Walworth became Sheriff of London in 1370 and Lord Mayor of London in 1374. He was a Member of Parliament for the City of London in 1371, 1376, 1377, and 1383, as one of the two aldermanic representatives of the city. As Lord Mayor of London, Walworth would have had more power than he did as a fishmonger and his wealth would have grown with this power. What some scholars would consider the origins of the modern state were beginning to form and with that was a growing focus on a centralised set of powers. The Lord Mayor of London would have been included in this set of powers, at least in England.

There was strong factionalism in the city of London during Walworth's time, and a faction of wealthy food merchants attracted complaints in the House of Commons for conspiring to inflate food prices. They were also generally opposed to the influence of the King's uncle John of Gaunt. This uptick in dissatisfaction is what helped to inspire the Peasants' Revolt.

== Peasants' Revolt ==
=== Causes for the Peasants' Revolt ===
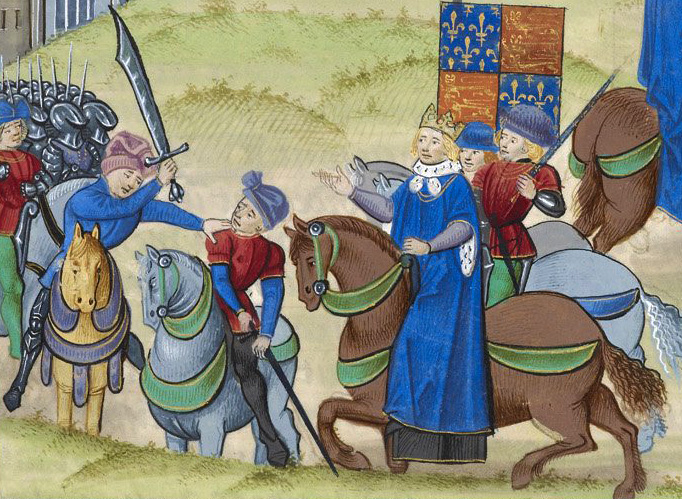
The death of Wat Tyler, by Jean Froissart. Left to right: Sir William Walworth (wielding sword), Wat Tyler, Richard II, and Sir John Cavendish (bearing decorated sword)

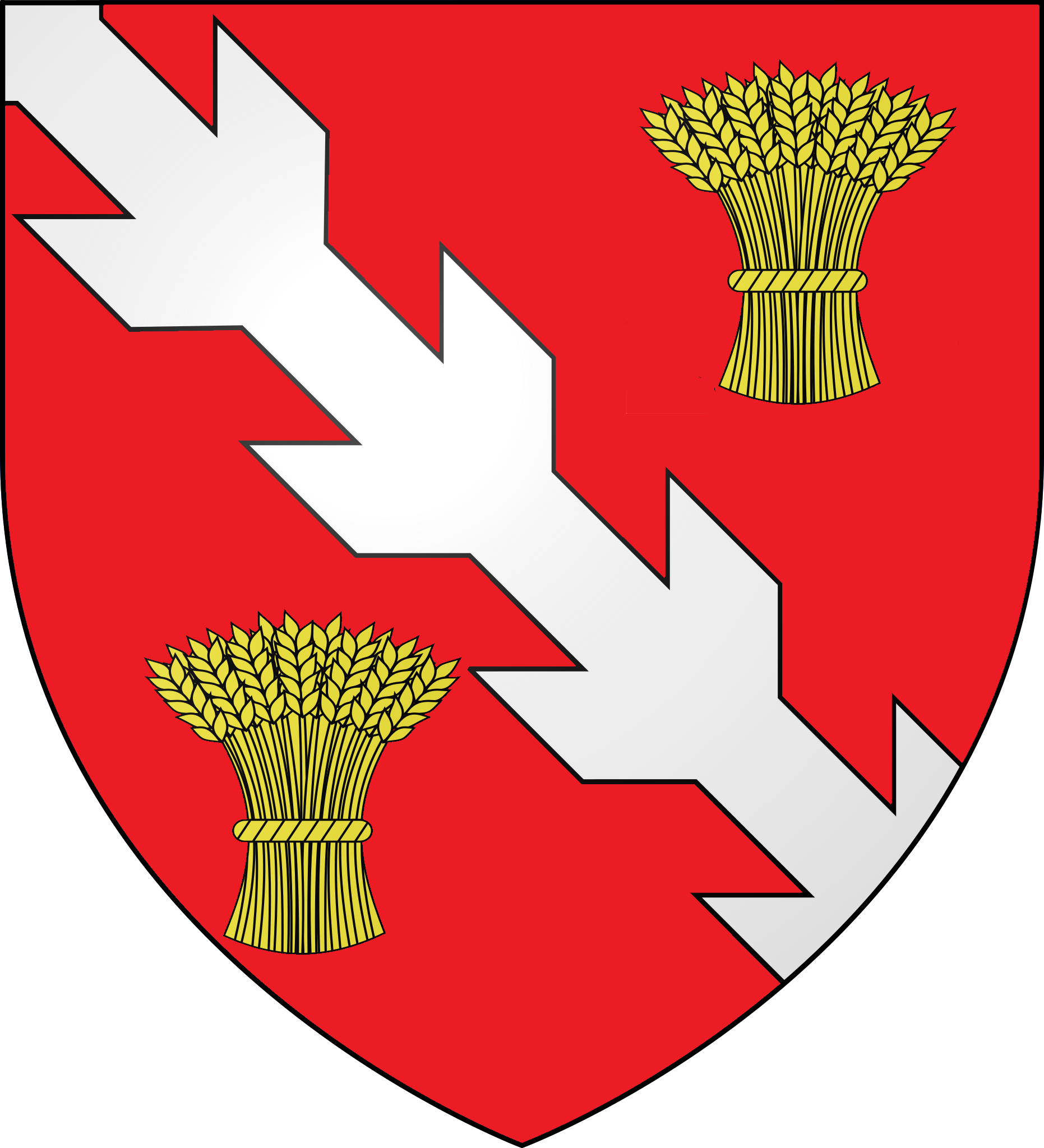
Coat of arms for Sir William Walworth

During Walworth's time, England (and most of Europe for that matter) was in a period of uncertainty. They were not a state by any means, but they were not as scattered as they had once been. This was causing the people to turn towards those in power for guidance rather than the church which had historically been a moral compass for many. Additionally, the Plague had swept through Europe in the middle of the 14th century and caused quite a few issues. The population was a fraction of what it used to be which meant that those in power needed more money from each individual person to fund their various wars, buildings, etc. This led to Walworth's most famous exploit — his encounter with Wat Tyler (the leader of the revolt) during the English peasants' revolt of 1381 in his second term as Lord Mayor.

=== Assassination of Wat Tyler ===
In June of that year, when Tyler and his followers entered South London, Walworth defended London Bridge against their revolt. During this encounter, Walworth killed Tyler in front of his people, but the method that Walworth used to kill Tyler is debated because the accounts are messy to the point that one scholar went on to compare it to the assassination of John F. Kennedy. JFK's assassination is notorious for multiple, contradicting accounts and a number of unanswered questions. Some scholars would suggest that Walworth slashed him heroically and he fell over half dead while others would suggest an alternate story that portrays Tyler and the other peasants as the heroes.

=== Aftermath ===
Walworth rode immediately back to London to raise the city bodyguard in the king's defence, for which service he was rewarded by knighthood and a pension. With four colleagues, he was knighted by Richard II following the death of Wat Tyler at Smithfield in June 1381, making him one of a few Londoners to be so elevated in the 14th century. With Walworth were four other aldermen, Nicholas Brembre, John Philpot, Nicholas Twyford and Robert Launde. The only other Londoners knighted in the century were Richard de Refham around 1312 and Mayor John de Pulteney in 1337; after 1381, the next Londoner knighted was William Estfield nearly 60 years later, in 1439.

== Death and Legacy ==
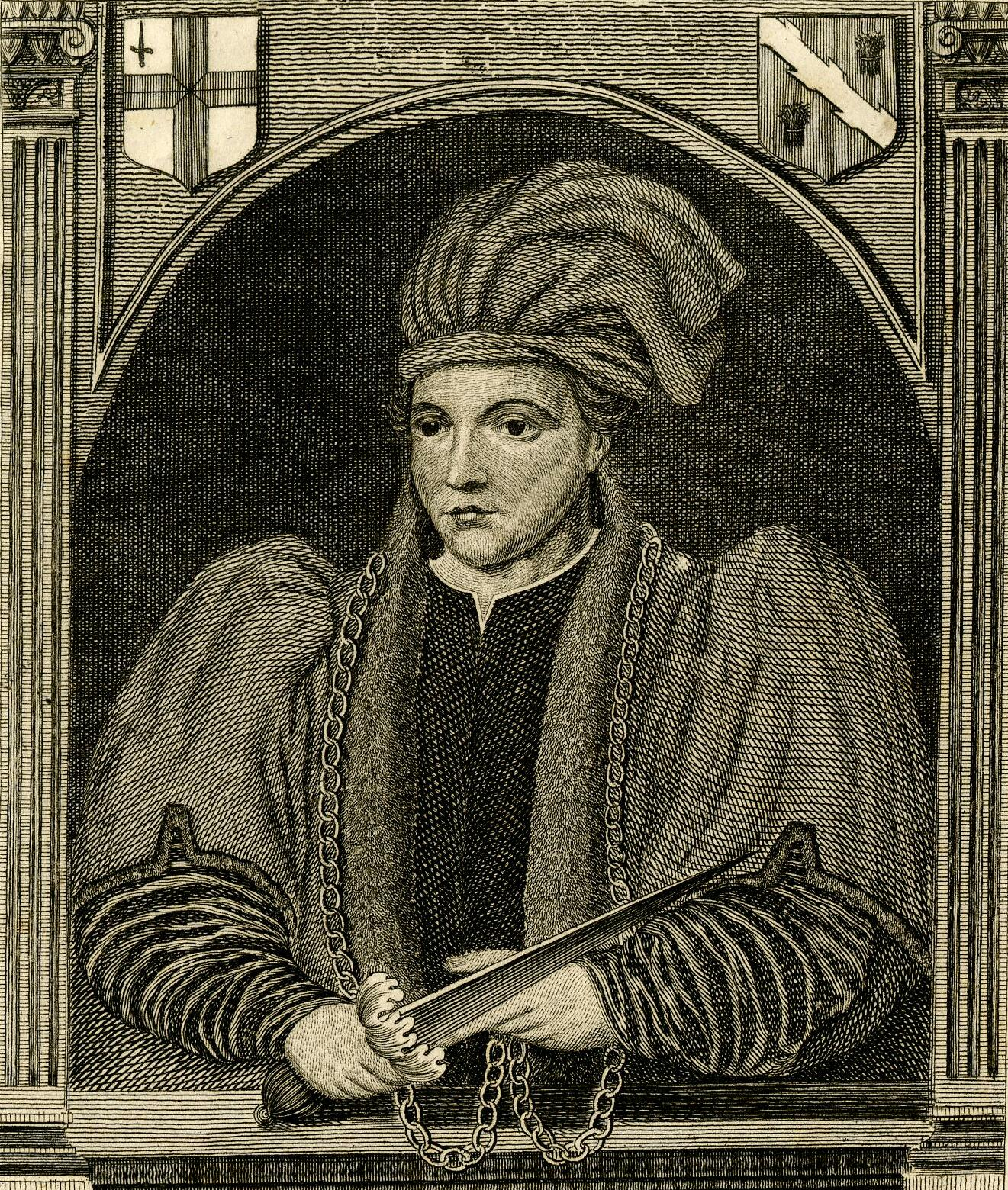
Imaginative posthumous portrait of Walworth, 1784

Sir William Walworth died in 1385, and was buried in the church of St. Michael, Crooked Lane, of which he was a considerable benefactor. His wife, Margaret (Lovekyn's widow), survived him and died sometime before 1413.

=== Walworth Memorabilia ===
The Fishmongers Guild considers him to be a hero and uses his legacy to their benefit, and he invariably figured in the pageants prepared by them when one of their members attained the mayoralty. Additionally, there were a number of references and commemorative artpieces made in his honor years after his death in 1385:

- 1592 — Walworth becomes a favorite hero in popular tales, and appeared in Richard Johnson's Nine Worthies of London
- 1603 — A survey of London and Westminster was written which depicts him as a hero
- 1868 — A statue is erected of him at the Holborn Viaduct that has him posed heroically
- 1914 — One of the six houses at the Kingston Grammar School bears Walworth's name
- Unknown Year — A statue of William Walworth is erected in the Fishmonger's Guild Hall that has him posed with the knife that he used to kill Wat Tyler
