= Atkey =

Atkey is a surname, and may refer to:

- Walter atte Keye (late 14th century), Brewer of Wood Street, City of London, England
- Albert Atkey (1867–1947), British politician
- Alfred Atkey (1894–1971), Canadian pilot of World War I
- Mel Atkey (born 1958), Canadian-English musical theatre composer and lyricist
- Ron Atkey (1942–2017), Canadian lawyer and politician
- Connor Atkey (born 1993), British Dj and producer
