= John Northampton =

Member of the Parliament of England

John Northampton (also known as John Comberton) (died 1398) was a reformist Lord Mayor of London in 1381 and 1382, during dissension in favour of reform of its Common Council in the early years of Richard II's reign. He had also served as Sheriff of London in 1376-77.

== Family ==
Northampton was raised in London, son of Thomas and Mariota Northampton. He is known to have had two brothers, William and Robert, and two sisters, Petronilla and Agnes.

He was twice married. His first wife, living in 1371, was named Johanna, his second, to whom he was married by 1375, Petronilla, daughter of John Preston and Margaret Constantine (also spelt Constantyn). By one of those marriages he left a son named James, who later became a Member of Parliament.

Northampton became alternatively known as John Comberton in the writings of chroniclers playing on the word comber (trouble) in reflection of the trouble that opponents thought his policies caused London.

Although he was a supporter of John of Gaunt, who also was an ally of John Wycliffe which led to speculation about his faction's religious views, Northampton was a devout Catholic rather than a Lollard.

== Career to 1381 ==
Northampton came early into business in the city, being named as one of four 'upholders' of the Drapers' Guild in 1361. His business was in Cordwainer Ward.

Outside his work he may have gained a turbulent reputation for he was bound over the keep the peace and refrain from affrays in the streets in 1365, 1369 and 1371. The 1369 incident may have had political overtones as the others in Northampton's group were all either Drapers or Mercers and one of the Mercers was John More, later to be a very close political ally. The incident in 1371 resulted in Edward III summoning the mayor, aldermen and leading men from the guilds to Guildford to swear to keep the peace in the city and Northampton along with eleven others being sent to the Tower of London.

Although he was probably financially qualified to be an Alderman in 1370, it was likely he was blocked for his perceived radicalism. He entered city politics as Alderman for the Cordwainer Ward from 1375 to 1377. He became leader of the lesser trades faction within London that supported John of Gaunt in contrast to the victuallers led by William Walworth and John Philipot.

Following the Good Parliament of 1376, he was one of a cohort of Londoners who ousted Richard Lyons and others from city offices and introduced the rule that Common Council members be chosen according to craft guild affiliations rather than by city ward. In 1376 he also became Sheriff of the City of London.

In 1378 he was elected as Member of Parliament for the City in that year's parliament.

== Mayoralty ==
He served two terms as Lord Mayor from 1381 to 1383, characterized by measures to help London's less prosperous citizens. He was opposed to the monopoly of the fishmongers, and broke this by enacting ordinances to open the markets to non-resident tradesmen and forbidding the wholesale purchase of fish for profit. He later applied such measures to trade in bread, ale, wine and poultry. He increased the circulation of farthings by reminting £80 into 76,000 coins, ordered bakers to make farthing measures of bread for sale, and ordered that traders, mass priests and others accept payments in the coin or give their services free. There were also moralistic ordinances made against prostitution, misrepresentation and false practices in business.

== Arrest, imprisonment, pardon ==
At the election in 1383 Northampton was ousted by Nicholas Brembre, who had King Richard's support.

Brembre had Northampton arrested on charges of sedition on 7 February 1384, and provoking an 'insurrection' in the city on the 11th, involving shop closures by supporters. His kinsman, John Constantine, was executed for his part in leading this. Northampton and two associates, John More and Richard Norbury, were tried by the King and council at Reading. Northampton unsuccessfully appealed to John of Gaunt. They were sentenced to death but this was commuted to 10 years' imprisonment, each man to be held in a separate prison at least 100 leagues outside London. Northampton, possibly through the influence of Cornish judge Sir Robert Tresilian, was confined at Tintagel.

A servant of Northampton's during his mayoralty was Thomas Usk who, after being arrested in 1384 by Northampton's rival Nicholas Brembre, gained release by informing on his former master through a legal appeal.

In 1386 the King pardoned Northampton but he remained banished from the city. Following the Merciless Parliament, as a result of which Brembre and Usk were executed in 1388, his situation improved with a full pardon granted in December 1390 and a full restoration of his citizenship in 1395.

== Last years ==
When the oligarchic leaders of London were able to engineer the overthrow of his faction, even the book of records of reform legislation was burned, known as the Jubilee Book by the mayor Nicholas Exton. The radical movements' mob politics heightened public reluctance to permit people's engagement in politics.

Northampton died in 1398 and was buried in the church of the Hospital of St Mary de Elsyngspital, Cripplegate. He had prospered to the extent of leaving property valued about £5,000, enabling him to be a benefactor to the Charterhouse monastery, to whose monks he made gifts of dates, figs and raisins during Lent.

== See also ==
- Thomas Usk

== Sources ==
- Leland, John L. (2004). "Tresilian, Sir Robert". Oxford Dictionary of National Biography (online ed.). Oxford University Press. doi:10.1093/ref:odnb/27715. (Subscription, Wikipedia Library access or UK public library membership required.)
- Nightingale, P. (1989). "Capitalists, Crafts and Constitutional Change in Late Fourteenth-Century London". Past & Present. 124: 3–35. doi:10.1093/past/124.1.3.
- Rawcliffe, Carole (1993). "NORTHAMPTON, James (d.1409), of London and Shoreditch, Mdx.". History of Parliament.
- Round, John Horace (1886). "Brembre, Nicholas" . In Stephen, Leslie (ed.). Dictionary of National Biography. Vol. 6. London: Smith, Elder & Co.
- Strohm, Paul (2004). "Northampton [Comberton], John". Oxford Dictionary of National Biography (online ed.). Oxford University Press. doi:10.1093/ref:odnb/20322. (Subscription, Wikipedia Library access or UK public library membership required.)
- Strohm, P. (2004a). "Exton, Nicholas (d. 1402)". Oxford Dictionary of National Biography (online ed.). Oxford University Press. doi:10.1093/ref:odnb/52173. Archived from the original on 12 June 2018. (Subscription, Wikipedia Library access or UK public library membership required.)
