= Fishmongers' monopoly =

The Fishmongers' monopoly was the monopoly held by the Fishmongers' Company over the sale and provision of fish into medieval London.

The monopoly of fresh fish sales in London arose through the combination of London citizen’s exclusive right to retail, and the right of Fishmonger guild members to judge market disputes involving fish in their manor court.

The monopoly's roots were in the early years of London's fishmongers' guild which started managing London's salted or "fresh" fish trade (as opposed to dry fish) according to their defined set of rules and regulation. The monopoly was lucrative as the medieval church forbade the consumption of meat on many days of the year for the purpose of fasting. The earliest evidence of the monopoly dates back to 1154, when a number of London fishmongers were fined for trading without Royal Warrant with the Fishmongers' Company receiving its first Royal Charter from Edward I in 1272 and securing approval for their "ordinances" or detailed market regulations in 1280.

The fishmongers were among the wealthiest of the London guilds in the reign of Edward III shown by a very lavish gift before he went to war in 1363. A 1364 Royal Charter from King Edward III further reinforced this control. It was which stipulated that "anyone wishing to sell fish were required to lodge with a Fishmonger during their stay in the City". The fishmongers' monopoly was at the center of the factional politics in the City of London during the 1370s and 1380s with the lesser trades agitating for more competition and a more conservative faction around the victuallers (of which the fishmongers were a core part) upholding the monopoly.

In 1376 the City of London's Franchise, or ability to manage its affairs. This meant that the fishmongers monopoly was re-established at a time of increasing tension within the city.

John Northampton, the leader of the lesser trades, became Lord Mayor in 1381. He persuaded the Common Council to declare that the Fishmongers should no longer have the power to monopolise London's trade in fish, enacting ordinances to open the markets to non-resident tradesmen and forbidding the wholesale purchase of fish for profit, which was reaffirmed by Parliament. Although some of the restrictions on the fishmongers, such as the ban on fishmongers becoming mayor, were subsequently overturned by Northmapton's successor, Nicholas Brembre, and a victualler ally of the fishmongers, he refused to reinstate the monopoly. However the lifting of the ban on a fishmonger mayor meant that his successor, Nicholas Exton could be elected.

However in 1399 Richard II granted a Royal Charter confirming the grants of Edward III and restoring all the fishmonger' privileges.

== Sources ==
- Barron, C. M. (1999). "Richard II and London". In Goodman, A.; Gillespie, J. L. (eds.). Richard II: The Art of Kingship. Oxford: Clarendon Press. pp. 129–154. ISBN 0-19-820189-3.
- Billington, S. (1990). "Butchers and Fishmongers: Their Historical Contribution to London's Festivity". Folklore. 101: 97–103. doi:10.1080/0015587X.1990.9715782. JSTOR 1259887. OCLC 1015879463.
- Capon, Peter; O'Mahony, Keeley, eds. (2022). What it Means to be a Fishmonger (PDF). London: Fishmongers' Company.
- Colson, J. (2014). "London's Forgotten Company? Fishmongers, their Trade and their Networks in Later Medieval London". In Barron, C. M.; Sutton, A.F. (eds.). The Medieval Merchant: Proceedings of the 29th Harlaxton Medieval Symposium. Donnington: Shaun Tyas. pp. 20–40. ISBN 978-0948695629.
- Herbert, William (1836). The History of the Twelve Great Livery Companies of London. Self published.
- Prescott, Andrew (23 September 2004). "Brembre, Sir Nicholas". Oxford Dictionary of National Biography (online ed.). Oxford University Press. (Subscription, Wikipedia Library access or UK public library membership required.)
- Strohm, Paul (2004). "Northampton [Comberton], John". Oxford Dictionary of National Biography (online ed.). Oxford University Press. doi:10.1093/ref:odnb/20322. (Subscription, Wikipedia Library access or UK public library membership required.)
- Timbs, John (1865), "Curiosities of the Fishmongers' Hall", Walks and talks about London, Lockwood
