= John More (MP for City of London) =

John More (fl. 1383–1384), was an English Member of Parliament (MP).

He was a Member of the Parliament of England for City of London 1383–1384. He was a close ally of the radical John Northampton in City politics at the time and had been arrested in a brawl with him before they both entered political office. In 1371 he was arrested in an incident that resulted in Edward III summoning the mayor, aldermen and leading men from the guilds to Guildford to swear to keep the peace in the city and More along with eleven others being sent to the Tower of London.

== Sources ==
- Nightingale, P. (1989). "Capitalists, Crafts and Constitutional Change in Late Fourteenth-Century London". Past & Present. 124: 3–35. doi:10.1093/past/124.1.3.
