= Robert Launde =

Sir Robert Launde was an Alderman of the City of London. As a companion of Richard II in the peasants' revolt he was one of a small number of Londoners to be knighted in the Middle Ages.

In 1376 he served as a Sheriff of the City of London with John Northampton. In 1380 he acted as a Member of Parliament for London.

With four colleagues, he was knighted by Richard II following the death of Wat Tyler at Smithfield in June 1381 with the Mayor William Walworth and three other aldermen, John Philpot, Nicholas Brembre and Nicholas Twyford. The only other Londoners knighted in the century were Richard de Refham around 1312 and Mayor John de Pulteney in 1337; after 1381, the next Londoner knighted was William Estfield nearly 60 years later, in 1439.

He was appointed on a commission to restore order after the peasants' revolt.

== Sources ==
- Barron, C. M. (2002). "Chivalry, Pageantry and Merchant Culture in Medieval London". In Coss, P. R. & Keen, M. (eds.). Heraldry, Pageantry and Social Display in Medieval England. Woodbridge: Boydell. pp. 219–242. ISBN 978-1-84383-036-8.
- Dunn, Alastair (2002). The Great Rising of 1381: the Peasants' Revolt and England's Failed Revolution. Stroud, UK: Tempus. ISBN 978-0-7524-2323-4.
