= Richard Lyons (Warden of the Mint) =

Member of the Parliament of England (1310 – 1381)

Sir Richard Lyons MP (1310 – 14 June 1381) was a City of London merchant, shipowner, and landowner who held a monopoly on the sale of sweet wine in London until he was impeached by the Good Parliament in 1376. He was an alderman, a member of the Worshipful Company of Vintners, and both sheriff of London and member of parliament for Essex. He was killed by Wat Tyler during the Peasants' Revolt.

Lyons was a lifelong friend of the poet Geoffrey Chaucer and of Chaucer’s father, who was a fellow vintner. Lyons employed Geoffrey Chaucer who repeatedly certified to the Exchequer, in 1374 and 1375, that no fraud was committed by Lyons. Lyons was also a lifelong friend of John of Gaunt.

== Career ==
Lyons was a merchant (in wine, wool, cloth, iron, and lead), shipowner, and landowner. He had business interests in Flanders and was extensively involved in maritime trade. Lyons was deeply involved in the politics of 1370s London, he was an alderman of the City of London, a member of the Worshipful Company of Vintners, and served as sheriff of London. Lyons was knighted and served as privy counsellor and as King Edward III's financial agent. He was also the head of a commission to investigate an attack on Portuguese merchant ships in 1371; keeper of the king’s monies at the Tower of London in 1375; collector of the petty customs in 1373; and collector of customs and subsidies in 1375. Lyons secured a practical monopoly on the London wine market that lasted until his impeachment: he leased, from the city the only three taverns in London that were permitted to sell sweet wines. It has been assumed that he acted as a broker for the Bardi banking family of Florence, from whom he took a commission.

Lyons was extremely rich: he owned lands in Essex, Kent, Suffolk, Surrey, Sussex, Middlesex, Hertfordshire, in addition to several properties in London: including a large house that contiguous with the Guildhall of the Hanse of Germany in Thames Street; and property in Cosyn Lane in the Ropery. Historian John Stow notes that Lyons’s effigy, at St Martin Vintry, London, represented a large purse: because, in the words of historian D. Carlson, ‘the man was a wallet’.

Together with his fellow Privy Counsellor William Latimer, 4th Baron Latimer, the king’s chamberlain, Lyons was involved in economic frauds, including the deliberate retardation of the market at several ports, the increase of the prices of foreign imports throughout the kingdom, and the abuse of his position as collector of the wool subsidy to export his wool otherwise than through the staple at Calais to avoiding duties. For this, Lyons and Latimer were impeached by the Good Parliament, in the first case of impeachment in English law, in response to which Lyons attempted to bribe Edward the Black Prince, to whom he sent £1,000 disguised as a barrel of sturgeon, but Edward refused to accept the bribe and imprisoned Lyons. However, Edward died later in 1376 after which Lyons, due to his favour with John of Gaunt, was pardoned.

Lyons served as member of parliament for Essex in 1380. Lyons established a perpetual chantry foundation at the Church of St James Garlickhithe, to which he donated vestments embroidered with lions, at which he is commemorated.

== Death ==
Lyons was beheaded at Cheapside on 14 June 1381 by Wat Tyler during the Peasants’ Revolt. 14th century historian Jean Froissart contends that Lyons was killed in revenge for his mistreatment of Tyler; but historian Knighton presumes that the peasants targeted Lyons as a consequence of his fraudulent wealth.
