= John Hadle =

14th–15th century English merchant, alderman, and Member of Parliament

John Hadle (also Hadele, Hadley; fl. 1360s–1400s, died c. 1410) was an English merchant, alderman, and politician in the City of London. He served as a prominent member of the Grocers' Company, as Lord Mayor of London twice, represented London in Parliament eleven times, and held civic office for more than thirty years.

== Early life and trade ==
Hadle was a successful grocer and an influential member of the Grocers' Company. He served as Master of the Company in 1383–1384.

== Parliamentary career ==
Hadle first entered national politics as a Member of Parliament for the City of London in 1369. According to the History of Parliament, his election may have been connected to his “strong and articulate opposition” to certain royal financial policies.

He went on to represent London in eleven parliaments (1369, 1377, 1378, 1379, 1381, twice in 1384, 1385, 1386, 1390, and 1402), making him one of the most frequently elected London MPs of the late fourteenth century.

== Civic offices ==
Hadle was elected Sheriff of London for 1375–1376 and became an alderman in March 1375, initially for Tower Ward. He later served as alderman for Lime Street Ward between 1384 and 1392, before returning to Tower Ward, where he remained until 1407.

He served two terms as Lord Mayor of London. The first of these was in 1379–1380, and then again in 1393–1394. Hadle also acted as a City Auditor in 1373, 1379, and 1391.

== Political context ==
Hadle’s long career spanned a period of intense political upheaval. He was active during the Good Parliament (1376) and the Bad Parliament (1377), and he remained in office during the Peasants' Revolt of 1381. Although not a leading figure in the suppression of the revolt, he was part of the civic establishment that restored order in the city.

The History of Parliament records that in 1371 he was arrested alongside the reformist leader John Northampton after a violent affray, an incident serious enough that King Edward III summoned the mayor, aldermen, and leading guildsmen to Guildford to swear to keep the peace. This episode suggests that Hadle was involved in the factional politics of the period, though he later distanced himself from Northampton’s more radical positions.

Hadle survived the political purges associated with the fall of Nicholas Brembre and the Merciless Parliament (1388), and he continued to hold office into the early years of the Lancastrian regime.

== Death ==
Hadle’s will was dated 8 January 1406 and proved on 8 February 1410, thus suggesting that he died between those dates.

== Offices held ==
- Alderman
  - Tower Ward: 1375–77, 1378–79, 1380–81, 1382–83, 1394–1407
  - Lime Street Ward: 1384–92
- Sheriff of London: 1375–76
- Lord Mayor of London: 1379–80; 1393–94
- Member of Parliament for the City of London: 1369, 1377, 1378, 1379, 1381, 1384 (twice), 1385, 1386, 1390, 1402
- City Auditor: 1373, 1379, 1391
- Master of the Grocers’ Company: 1383–84
