= John Constantine (cordwainer) =

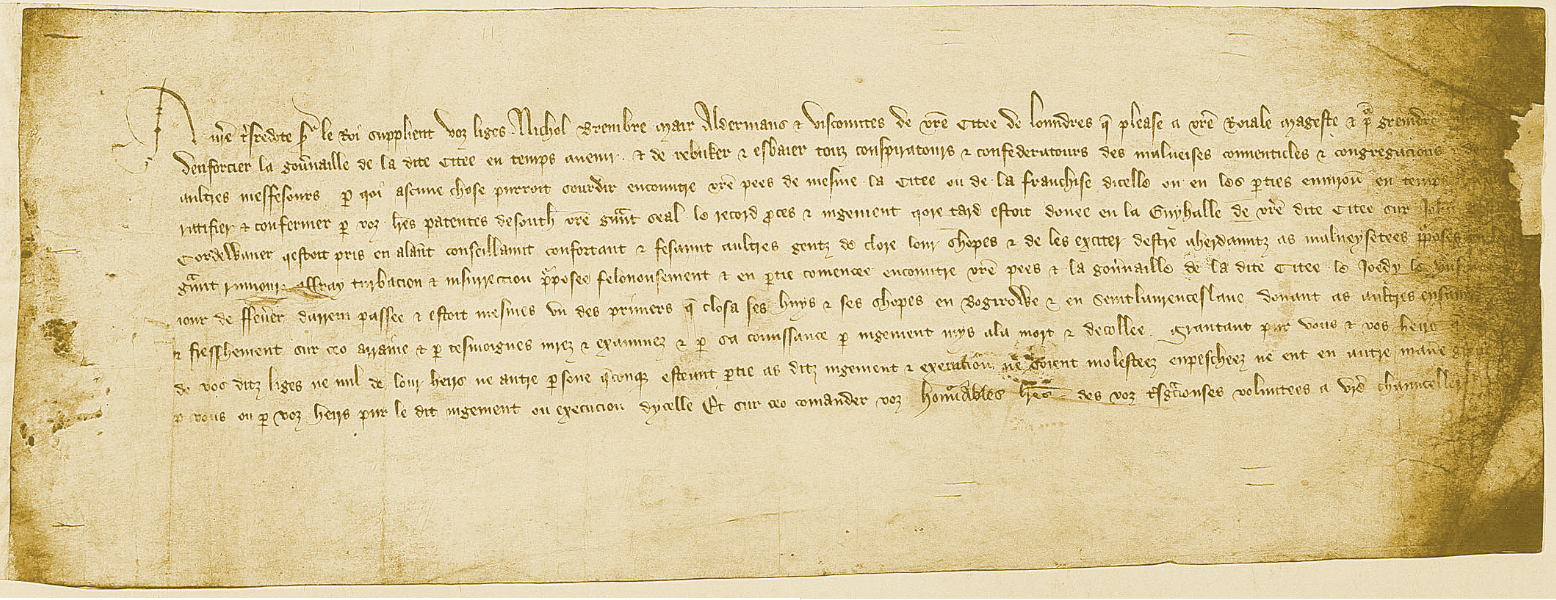
Petition of Brembre, April 1484, requesting the Royal council's ratification of the mayoral court's judgment on Constantine for inciting riots in the city; the petition also requests immunity from prosecution for those officials involved.

John Constantine was a cordwainer and a close advisor and relative by marriage of the Lord Mayor of London John Northampton who had just lost a contested re-election to Nicholas Brembre for which he was summarily executed.

At the election in 1383 Northampton was ousted by Brembre, who had King Richard's support. Brembre had Northampton arrested on charges of sedition on 7 February 1384, and provoking an 'insurrection' in the city on the 11th, involving shop closures by supporters.

On 11 February 1384 Constantine organised a campaign of shop closures by Northampton's supporters. "Excited as some will have it, by a spirit sent from the Devil, careered through the streets of London urging the populace to rise against the Mayor [Brembre], whom he declared to be bent on smashing all those who supported John of Northampton", as the Westminster Chronicle puts it. Brembre treated this as an insurrection and had Constantine summarily executed in Cheapside and his head set above Newgate.

Three months later, a grocer was accused of speaking against Brembre―for "falsely and iniquitously" revenging himself upon Constantine—and in all over sixty people appeared before the mayoral court on such charges. Indeed, they provide the bulk of Brembre's court business.

Northampton and two associates, John More and Richard Norbury, were tried by the King and council at Reading. Northampton unsuccessfully appealed to John of Gaunt. They were sentenced to death but this was commuted to 10 years' imprisonment, each man to be held in a separate prison at least 100 leagues outside London. Northampton, possibly through the influence of Cornish judge Sir Robert Tresilian, was confined at Tintagel.

== Sources ==
- Barron, C. M (1971). "Richard II's Quarrel with London". In Du Boulay, F. R. H.; Barron, C. M. (eds.). The Reign of Richard II: Essays in Honour of May McKisack. London: University of London, Athlone Press. pp. 173–201. OCLC 265036853.
- Cohn, S. K. (2013). Popular Protest in Late Medieval English Towns. Cambridge: Cambridge University Press. ISBN 978-1-10702-780-0.
- Hanawalt, B. (2017). Ceremony and Civility: Civic Culture in Late Medieval London. Oxford: Oxford University Press. ISBN 978-0-19049-043-0.
- TNA. "SC 8/183/9147" (1384) [manuscript]. Special Collections: Ancient Petitions, Series: SC 8, p. Petitioners: Nicholas Brembre, mayor of London; Aldermen and sheriffs of London. Kew: The National Archives.
