= Walter atte Keye =

English brewer

The Indictment of Walter atte Keye, November 1381

...Walter atte Keye, leading a company of other malefactors, came to the house of Andrew Vernoun, brewer, at Paul's Wharf, London, on the said Friday [14 June]. Walter criminally and treasonably forced his way into the said house unless the latter paid a fine to him. In the face of these threats, and in fear of his life, Andrew paid a fine of 3s 4d which Walter received despite its criminal and treasonable form. Accordngly Walter was a common malefactor to take such fines, as he did with many men in the said city of London.

– The National Archives, coram rege rolls: KB 27/482/43

Walter atte Keye was a late-fourteenth-century brewer of Wood Street in the City of London. He is best known as one of the leaders of the 1381 Peasants' Revolt in London.

On 14 June 1381 Keye attempted to steal and destroy the Common Council's book of ordinances, called le Jubyle, or Jubilee Book. (Note: The Jubilee Book (so-called due to is compilation during Edward III's jubilee year, 1376-7), substantially and radically revised the city's ordinances, although due to its later destruction by Mayor Exton, the book's precise contents remain necessarily vague.) It was stored in a sheriff's compter. The rebels also attacked the Guildhall and other civic buildings first and at least the former he attempted to burn down. Since the book was subsequently burned by a later Mayor of London, Nicholas Exton, little is known of its contents of the book. Historians have been unable to ascertain Keye's motive for his "frenzied" search for it. Keye also appears to have personally led a small armed force to the Milk Street sheriff's compter, which they assaulted and despoiled. Keye also took advantage of the general turmoil of the time to extort money from fellow brewers. He and his associates have been described by Barrie Dobson as showing that there was at least one rebel group "prepared to challenge the authority of the civic hierarchy as well as that of royal officials and agents."
