= Adam de Bury =

Adam de Bury was twice Lord Mayor of London and an MP for London in the fourteenth century.
