= Craft guild =

Type of medieval artisans' organisation

Craft guilds were associations of skilled artisans in medieval Europe that regulated production, training, and quality within specific trades, while also shaping the economic and civic life of urban communities.

They transmitted skills through formal systems of apprenticeship, journeymanship and mastery, and oversaw the production of goods ranging from textiles and metalwork to glassmaking and baking. In major cities in medieval Europe such as Florence, Paris, Barcelona, and the German free cities, guilds became central to economic and civic life, often numbering in the dozens or even hundreds.

== See also ==
- Craft Unionism

== Bibliography ==
- Braudel, Fernand (1992) [1982]. The Wheels of Commerce. Civilization & capitalism, 15th–18th century. Vol. 2. University of California Press. ISBN 978-0-520-08115-4.
