= William Venour =

William Venour was a Lord mayor of London and a Member of Parliament for the City of London in the fourteenth century.

He was a grocer and also served as collector of the wool subsidy.

== Sources ==
- Coleman, O. (1969). "The Collectors of Customs in London under Richard II". In Hollaender, A. E. J.; Kellaway, W. (eds.). Studies in London History Presented to Philip E. Jones. London: Hodder and Stoughton. pp. 181–194. OCLC 220501191.
