= Good Parliament =

Name given to the English parliament of 1376

←	45th Parliament of King Edward III	Bad Parliament	→
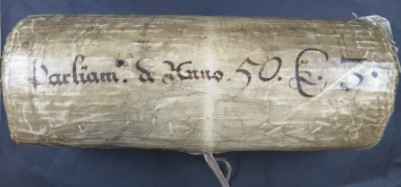
- Parliament Roll for the Good Parliament (National Archives), with regnal year Anno 50 E 3

Overview
- Legislative body: Parliament of England
- Meeting place: Palace of Westminster
- Term: 28 April 1376 – 10 July 1376

Painted Chamber

The Good Parliament is the name traditionally given to the English Parliament of 1376. Sitting in Westminster from April 28 to July 10, it was the longest Parliament up until that time. It turned into a parliamentary revolution, with the Commons (supported to some extent by the Lords) venting their grievances at decades of crippling taxation, misgovernment, and suspected endemic corruption among the ruling classes.

It took place during a time when the English court was perceived by much of the English population to be corrupt, and its traditional name was due to the sincere efforts by its members to reform the government. It had a formidable enemy, however, in John of Gaunt, fourth son of Edward III and the effective ruler of England at the time.

== In session ==
Parliament had not met since November 1373, two and a half years previously, the longest period without a Parliament since 1305. Although Edward III and his councillors recognised the danger of calling a parliament during a period of dissatisfaction, due to reversals in the Hundred Years' War the need for funds was so pressing in 1376 that another parliament was necessary.

Once the members were assembled, they were determined to clean up the corrupt Royal Council. Peter de la Mare, a knight of the shire representing Herefordshire, had been elected as Speaker by the House of Commons, and on the first day he delivered an address criticising England's recent military failures, condemning the corruption at court, and calling for close scrutiny of the royal accounts.

The Commons refused to grant money for the war unless most of the great officers of state were dismissed. Richard Lyons and Lord Latimer, who were believed to be robbing the treasury, were called before Parliament and then imprisoned. Latimer's impeachment is the earliest recorded in Parliament. The king's mistress Alice Perrers, another focus of popular resentment, was barred from any further association with him and removed from the court.

With the Black Prince supporting reform, John of Gaunt was left isolated. Parliament then imposed a new set of councillors on the king including Edmund Mortimer, the Earl of March; and William of Wykeham, Bishop of Winchester.

The Black Prince's death on June 8 robbed the Parliament of one of its strongest supports. Due to fears of John of Gaunt claiming the throne Parliament summoned Edward III's grandson Richard and acknowledged him as heir to the throne.

But even after the government acceded to virtually all their demands, the Commons then refused to authorise any funds for the war, losing the sympathy of the Lords as a result.

Parliament was dissolved on 6 July.

== Aftermath ==
The following autumn, John of Gaunt attempted to undo its work. He barred the admission of the new councillors assigned to the king. He threw Peter de la Mare into prison at Nottingham. He dismissed the new council and recalled Latimer. Alice of Perrers was restored to the company of the king. John also attacked William of Wykeham.

In 1377, John had another parliament convene, the Bad Parliament. John had the Good Parliament declared void and its acts removed from the books. However the Parliament got the name the "Good Parliament" due to its popularity outside the court for addressing large number of individual grievances with the removal of unpopular royal advisers.

== See also ==
- List of parliaments of England

== Sources ==
- Castor, Helen (2024). The Eagle and the Hart: The Tragedy of Richard II and Henry IV.
- Highfield, J.R.L.; Tout, Thomas Frederick (1999). "The years of decline: 1360–77". britannica.com.
- Kleineke, Hannes (18 June 2019). "The Good, the Bad and the Wonderful: The dramatic Parliaments of the late 14th century (Part One)". historyofparliament.com.
- Kingsford, Charles Lethbridge (1892). "Latimer, William (1329?-1381)" . Dictionary of National Biography. London: Smith, Elder & Co.
- Leach, Arthur Francis (1911). "William of Wykeham" . In Chisholm, Hugh (ed.). Encyclopædia Britannica (11th ed.). Cambridge University Press.
- McNeill, Ronald John (1911). "March, Earls of" . In Chisholm, Hugh (ed.). Encyclopædia Britannica. Vol. 17 (11th ed.). Cambridge University Press. pp. 685–688.
- Thompson, Edward Maunde (1888). "De la Mare, Peter" . Dictionary of National Biography. London: Smith, Elder & Co.
