= Richard II's gyration =

Richard II's gyration was a tour of England by Richard II in 1387 to muster support against oversight by a commission of three Lords appointed by the Wonderful Parliament.

The word gyrare is used by the contemporary chronicler Henry Knighton.

Despite a fear of a French invasion in October 1386 the Wonderful Parliament, with the support of senior Lords, refused a request for very high taxes until the chancellor Michael de la Pole was removed. The King initially replied that he would not dismiss as much as a kitchen scullion at parliament's request. and only when threatened with deposition did Richard remove Pole. A commission was set up to review and control royal finances for a year.

Richard saw this commission as an affront to the royal prerogative, and from February to November 1387 went on a "gyration" of the country to muster support for his cause. This prolonged absence from London was intended to allow the King to consolidate his popular support in areas where loyalty to the Crown was particularly strong. By installing Robert de Vere as Justice of Chester, he began the work of creating a loyal military power base around the Midlands and in Cheshire. Much of the funding came from Nicholas Brembre, a rich wool merchant and recent Mayor of London. He also secured a legal ruling from Chief Justice Robert Tresilian that parliament's conduct had been unlawful and treasonable.

It ended with the formation of the Lords Appellant to oppose Richard's move which they did in the Merciless Parliament.

== Sources ==
- Bennett, M. J. (1999). "Richard II and the Wider Realm". In Goodman, A.; Gillespie, J. L. (eds.). Richard II: The Art of Kingship. Oxford: Clarendon. pp. 187–204. ISBN 978-0-19820-189-2.
- Chrimes, S. B. (1956). "Richard II's questions to the judges". Law Quarterly Review. lxxii: 365–390.
- Given-Wilson, C.; Brand, P.; Phillips, S.; Ormrod, M.; Martin, G.; Curry, A.; Horrox, R., eds. (2005). "Introduction: Richard II: October 1386". British History Online. Parliament Rolls of Medieval England. Woodbridge.
- Goodman, Anthony (1971). The Loyal Conspiracy: The Lords Appellant under Richard II. London: Routledge. ISBN 0-7100-7074-8.
- Harriss, Gerald (2005). Shaping the Nation: England, 1360–1461. Oxford University Press. ISBN 0-1982-2816-3.
- McKisack, May (1959). The Fourteenth Century: 1307–1399. Oxford University Press. ISBN 0-1982-1712-9.
- Roskell, J. S. (1984). The Impeachment of Michael de la Pole, Earl of Suffolk in 1386: In the Context of the Reign of Richard II. Manchester: Manchester University Press. ISBN 978-0-71900-963-1.
- Sanderlin, S. (1988). "Chaucer and Ricardian Politics". The Chaucer Review. 22: 171–184. OCLC 43359050.
- Saul, Nigel (1997). Richard II. New Haven: Yale University Press. ISBN 978-0-300-07003-3.
- Tuck, Anthony (1985). Crown and Nobility 1272–1461: Political Conflict in Late Medieval England. London: Fontana. ISBN 0-0068-6084-2.
- Tuck, Anthony (2004). "Richard II (1367–1400)". Oxford Dictionary of National Biography. Oxford University Press. doi:10.1093/ref:odnb/23499.
