= Wonderful Parliament =

English parliament of 1386

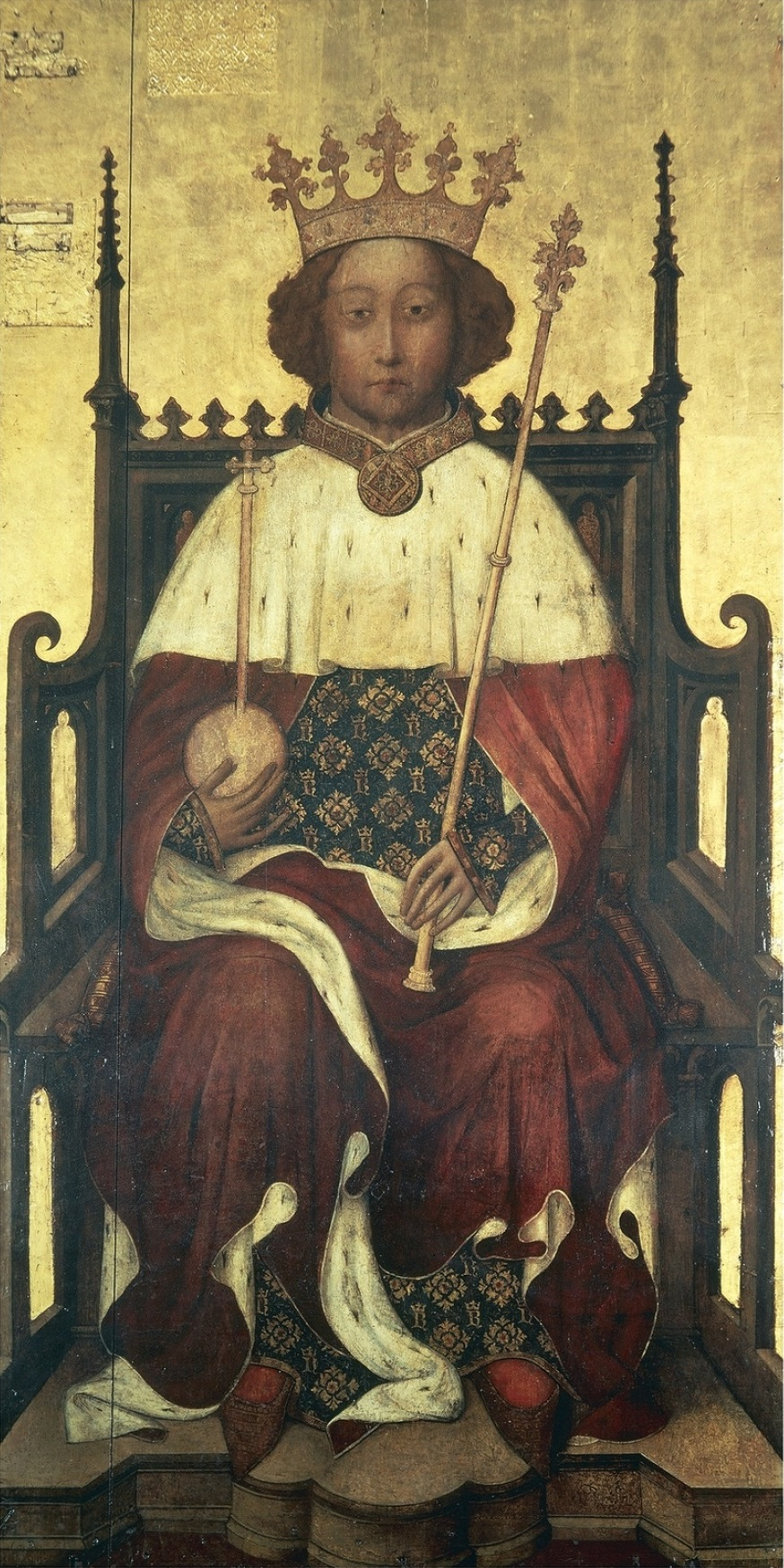
King Richard II of England, from the portrait in Westminster Abbey.

The Wonderful Parliament was a session of the English parliament held from October to November 1386 in Westminster Abbey. Originally called to address King Richard II's need for money, it quickly refocused on pressing for the reform of his administration. The King had become increasingly unpopular because of excessive patronage towards his political favourites combined with the unsuccessful prosecution of war in France. Further, there was a popular fear that England was soon to be invaded, as a French fleet had been gathering in Flanders for much of the year. Discontent with Richard peaked when he requested an unprecedented sum to raise an army with which to invade France. Instead of granting the King's request, the houses of the Lords and the Commons effectively united against him and his unpopular chancellor, Michael de la Pole, 1st Earl of Suffolk. Seeing de la Pole as both a favourite who had unfairly benefited from the King's largesse, and the minister responsible for the King's failures, parliament demanded the earl's impeachment.

At first, the King refused to attend the parliament, instead attempting—unsuccessfully—to dissolve the sitting. Richard requested the Commons send a delegation to negotiate with him at Eltham Palace; they, fearing an ambush, sent two lords instead. One of them, the Duke of Gloucester (Richard's uncle) threatened Richard with deposition unless the King agreed to return to Westminster and do parliament's bidding. He was forced to sack the unpopular de la Pole and was restricted to advisers vetted and appointed by parliament. The King was incensed at what he perceived to be an unnatural restriction on his God-given right to appoint his own ministers and advisers; he left Westminster almost immediately. He spent much of the following year gathering support, ignoring his parliament-imposed council, and taking legal advice on how to annul the constraints on his rule. During this time de la Pole was returned to royal favour. Although the King managed to overturn most of the restrictions the Wonderful Parliament placed upon him, within a few years the crisis had resurged, even worse than in 1386. Armed conflict broke out between crown and nobility, eventually resulting in de la Pole's exile, and the execution of many of his supporters.

== Political background ==
In 1386 ... when the king should have first blossomed into manhood, a certain archbishop of York called Alexander Neville, Robert de Vere, Duke of Ireland, Michael de la Pole, earl of Suffolk and chancellor of England, Robert Tresilian, the king's chief justice, and Sir Nicholas Brembre, formerly mayor of the city of London, were the king's rulers and closest advisers. They were men of vicious character who deceived the king, having an eye to the business neither of the king nor kingdom, but they grasped to themselves the riches of iniquity by many evil deeds. The impoverished king was put into the shadow of their sin, and so the realm was smitten by the levying of a great plague of tenths and subsidies.

— Thomas Favent's short chronicle of the parliament, probably composed c. 1388, describes the background to the session. (Note: McHardy describes Favent as politically sympathetic to the King's enemies and of "strong opinions... loquacious and convoluted", but valuable in its detail.)

Richard II succeeded to the throne in 1377 on the death of his grandfather, Edward III, but his unpopularity had been growing since Richard's suppression of the Peasants' Revolt in 1381. He was increasingly criticised for his patronage of a few select royal favourites, to an extent that has been described as "lavish to the point of foolishness" by a biographer, historian Anthony Tuck. Parliament was also coming to the view that the King needed to rule as economically as was possible, and they observed with displeasure the King's distribution of extravagant patronage to a limited circle, the greatest recipient of which was Michael de la Pole, Earl of Suffolk. Furthermore, the Hundred Years' War was going poorly for England. Several expeditions had left for France in the early years of Richard's reign to defend English territory, but they were almost all military and political failures. (Note: For example, the Bishop of Norwich's 1383 expedition to Bruge which was widely criticised at the time.) In spite of these setbacks, parliament faced requests from the King for increased subsidies to pay for the war. The King was also unpopular because of his choice of advisers, particularly de la Pole, the chancellor, who was felt to exert too much influence on foreign policy and so became inextricably linked with its failure. One 20th-century historian, Clementine Oliver, has described de la Pole as a "staunch loyalist"; he had been elevated to the peerage as Earl of Suffolk only the previous year, the first of his family to receive a peerage. He advocated peace overtures to the French. Tuck has argued that, while probably the most sensible policy the government could have adopted, pacificism was unpopular with much of the English nobility, as a martial career such as their fathers had enjoyed was expected to be financially and chivalrically profitable. Some young nobles—such as the Earls of Arundel and Warwick—had "been kept in good humour since 1376 only by a lavish distribution of crown perquisites and war salaries", argues scholar M. V. Clarke".

In the event, as Tuck has said, subsequent royal attempts at a "policy of rapprochement with France made little headway". This may, combined with his uncle John of Gaunt's 1385 invasion of Castile, have provoked the planned French invasion of England of 1386. Further, France had recently renewed the Auld Alliance with Scotland, by which the former promised the latter an expeditionary force and 40,000 gold florins. Gaunt was the wealthiest man in England besides the king, and had often put his money to Richard's use. With Gaunt absent in Spain, he could use neither his wealth nor his retinue in defence of his nephew the King when the attacks of the Wonderful Parliament came. Either way, the war with France, being both exorbitantly expensive and producing few military successes for it, was the immediate cause of the parliament. For Richard, as historian J. S. Roskell put it, it also had the result of creating an "adversely critical attitude towards the government" that reflected negatively upon the King.

On top of the expense and failure of the campaign in France, the King urgently needed funds to defend the border with Scotland, and the kingdom from a possible French invasion. Medievalist Nigel Saul has argued that due to these threats, in summer 1386 "panic was taking hold of the south-eastern counties". The chronicler Thomas Walsingham described how like "timid mice they scurried hither and thither... This behaviour from men, who had showed up well in the tranquillity of peace with their fierce bravery, did not set an example to be followed of what should be done when they thought that battle was at hand and danger imminent." The absence of Gaunt probably increased the sense of hysteria. Gaunt was not to return to England for another three years, and Richard took advantage of Gaunt's absence to advance his favoured courtiers further up the peerage.

=== Parliament and parliamentary commissions ===
The previous parliament had attempted to force a commission upon the King in an effort to reform the royal household and especially its expenditure. This commission was effectively a regency council for the King. However, Richard limited the duration of the council's powers to one year, and it had expired by the time of the 1386 parliament. This commission criticised the King's distribution of patronage and also attempted to prevent him from elevating his choice of men to the ranks of the upper nobility. The King did not approve of the commission or its advice that he listen to more judicious counsellors, and ignored it. By the time parliament sat in October 1386, an atmosphere of political crisis was apparent to all.

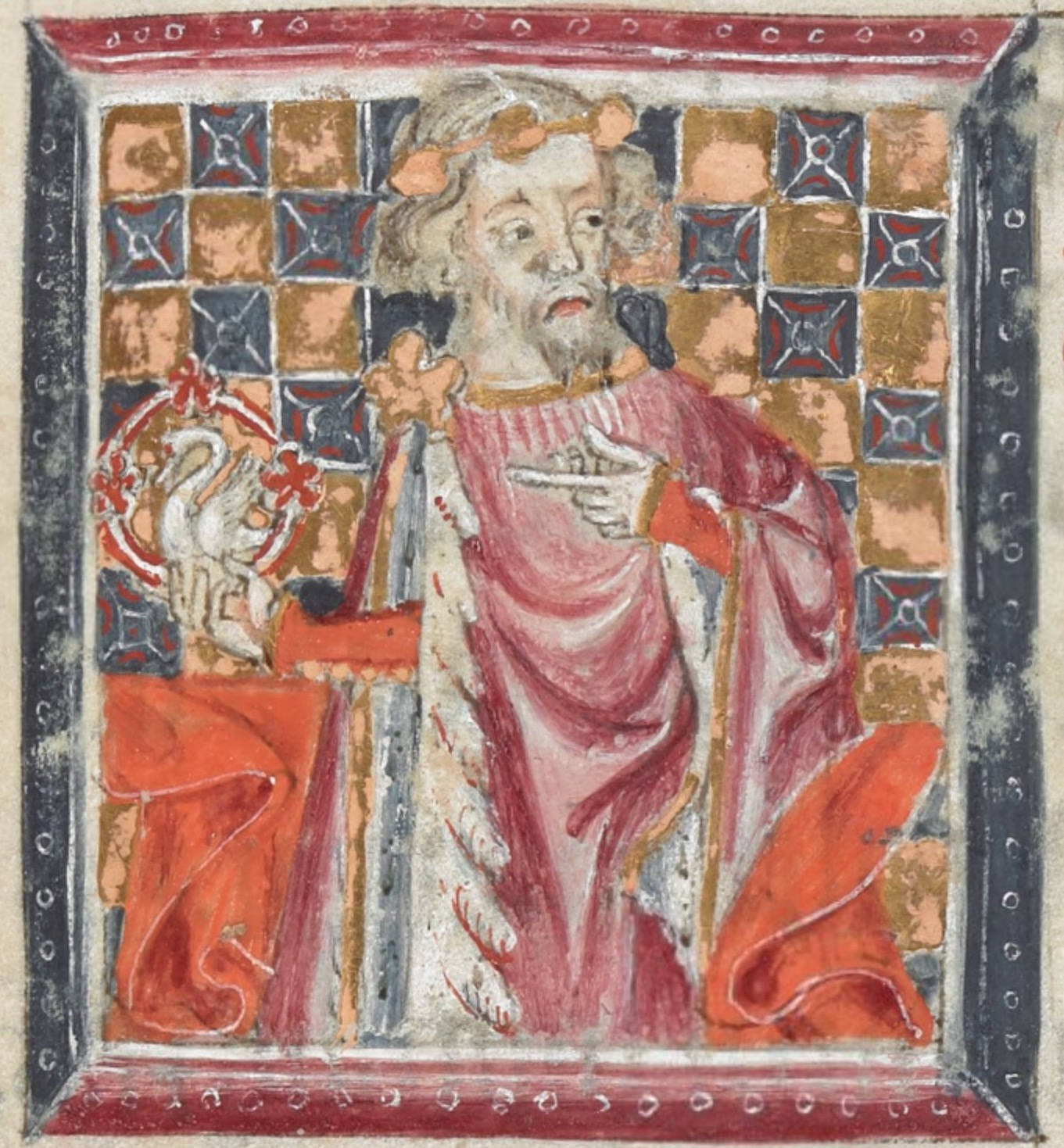
Thomas of Woodstock, Duke of Gloucester, threatened to depose Richard in 1386.

No military successes had been achieved since the previous parliament, despite an extensive—and expensive—campaign in 1385. (Note: The previous year's invasion had resurrected the ancient feudal levy, a by-then moribund form of scutage. Unused since 1327, the levy was particularly unpopular with the commons as it contained an element of forced recruitment. Historians G. L. Harriss and May McKisack described the campaign as "ignominious" and "inglorious" respectively, while Christopher Fletcher argues that "only those who have approached events from the perspective of Scotland or the French invaders have granted [the campaign] much importance". The English army resorted to pillaging for sustenance, and destroyed much of Lothian, while showing little quarter to Scottish prisoners.) For the King personally, not only did he fall out badly with his uncle, John of Gaunt, but his financial and military impotence was exposed to all and sundry. If the campaign had been a success, on the other hand, then the king, as a returning conqueror would have drawn comparisons in martial prowess with his father and grandfather. By 1386, "the Commons had no good reason to overlook the excessive generosity of the King or to acquiesce in his government's arbitrary taxation" as historian John Palmer put it. Most of the criticisms raised by the 1386 parliament had already been complained of in that of 1385. Little had been done to resolve them by either King or chancellor, and when the 1386 parliament convened, continues Palmer, it "nursed a number of very substantial grievances".

In terms of domestic politics, there was a financial crisis; this was blamed on Suffolk and the King's perceived extravagance. Regarding foreign policy, the biggest issue was the threat of imminent French invasion. King Charles VI of France had, after six years of siege, finally taken Ghent and crushed its revolt in December 1385. His victory now gave him the time and resources to plan an invasion of England, and in March 1386 he began gathering a large fleet at Sluys. By September it was reckoned in England to be on the verge of sailing. The King convened the royal council to Osney Abbey, in Oxfordshire in August and it was decided to summon a parliament in face of this threat. Writs of summons were issued to the Lords Spiritual and Lords Temporal (including Richard's newly elevated favourites (Note: They had all been elevated in 1385, and were Robert de Vere as Marquis of Dublin, Michael de la Pole, Earl of Suffolk, Edmund of Langley, Duke of York and Thomas of Woodstock, Duke of Gloucester; the latter two were the King's younger uncles.)), as well as nearly 300 commoners, the same month. In the meantime an army of 10,000 men had been gathered to surround London and protect it from the expected invasion, and it was that army, and the concomitant necessity for urgent funds, that provided the main reason for parliament being called.

Parliament opened on 1 October 1386, with a notably small number of ecclesiastics attending. Those that did—such as Bishop Courtenay, brother of one of Richard's most outspoken critics—were regarded by the King as partisans against him. Michael de la Pole, as chancellor, made the customary opening speech; it would be the last occasion on which he would do so. In his speech, he claimed that it had been decided in Oxfordshire that the King would personally lead a foreign expedition to defend his claim to the French throne and prosecute the war with France with increased vigour. He also covered a number of other topics, including the possibility of revaluing the currency—on account, supposedly, of it being taken out of the realm and circulation too often—and moving the Calais Staple to Westminster. But de la Pole had severely misread his audience.

== Attack on the royal prerogative ==
The first—and for the King, most important—item of business on the parliamentary agenda was his request for a subsidy, or tax of movable goods, of four fifteenths and two-tenths, which was calculated to bring in the large sum of around £155,000. (Note: Economic historian Roger Schofield has argued that, by the late middle ages "the fifteenth and tenth was universally regarded as the normal form of parliamentary taxation", with the Commons declaring at the parliament of 1475 that And for asmoch as wee remembre, that the moost easy, redy and prone payment, of any charge to be born within this Reame, by the Commens of the same, is by Graunt of Xvcs and xcs all the Levie whereof amongs your people is so useuell. Originally a tax on moveable goods, it had become sufficiently prone to evasion and avoidance that by Richard II's reign it was being levied as a fixed sum, being negotiated with each town and borough by royal officials.)

Saul has argued that "never before had such a sum been demanded, and it was this that precipitated Suffolk's fall. There was an immediate—and concerted—assault by the Commons and the Lords, who were "with one mind... complaining grievously". The Commons, to some degree representing public opinion, "demanded a scapegoat", says May McKisack. The Lords, encouraged by their most powerful members such as Thomas Beauchamp, Earl of Warwick and Richard Fitzalan, Earl of Arundel, the Archbishop of Canterbury and the Bishops of Winchester and Exeter, would have, it has been said, "presented a formidable opposition to a boy of nineteen", as the King was. The precise political manoeuvrings of the various parties are now obscured, but no royal business was transacted. At some point the discussions moved from the question of tax to that of the King's chancellor. However it came about, it certainly resulted in the King making a spirited defence of his right to choose his own ministers and of the royal prerogative. Conversely, the Commons demanded that the King appoint his councillors in parliament, effectively placing them under parliamentary oversight.

=== Attack on Michael de la Pole ===
It is possible that the original plan was to impeach Robert de Vere, who was felt to have at least as much influence with the King as Suffolk, if not more. However, that the attack was eventually launched on the chancellor is probably down to the simple fact that he was seen as more of a parvenu and thus, of the two, the easier target. Whatever the original tactics, the plan that was finally acted upon were to impeach de la Pole, and thus to attack the King indirectly; but the articles of impeachment were sloppily prepared (Note: It was only the second time in its history that parliament had attempted to impeach anyone. It had previously impeached royal ministers in 1376, when Edward III had been incapacitated by his final illness, but this was the first time such censure had been used while a compos mentis monarch occupied the throne.)—although the charges themselves were neither inconsequential nor insignificant, argues Roskell. As a result of poor preparation, the most general charges were unprovable. Others (for example, the conduct of the war with France) were shown to be the joint responsibility of the royal council, and so not solely Suffolk's fault; N. B. Lewis has questioned the validity of the claims against de la Pole, suggesting that they were "trivial or unfounded... merely pretexts for dismissing the chief minister of an unpopular King". In any case, the parliament itself became increasingly focused on personally attacking the earl and the perceived abuse of the authority of the chancellorship, even down to the supposed theft of a charter from Dover Castle. The affair ended up "dragg[ing] on for at least a month [and] degenerated into three badly sustained and trivial charges, behind each of which motives of malice or private interest may be suspected," one commentator has written. De la Pole's main defence was two-pronged: on the one hand, he accused his accusers of expecting a higher morality from him than from the King's other advisers, and on the other hand, that he could not be held solely responsible for what were collective decisions.

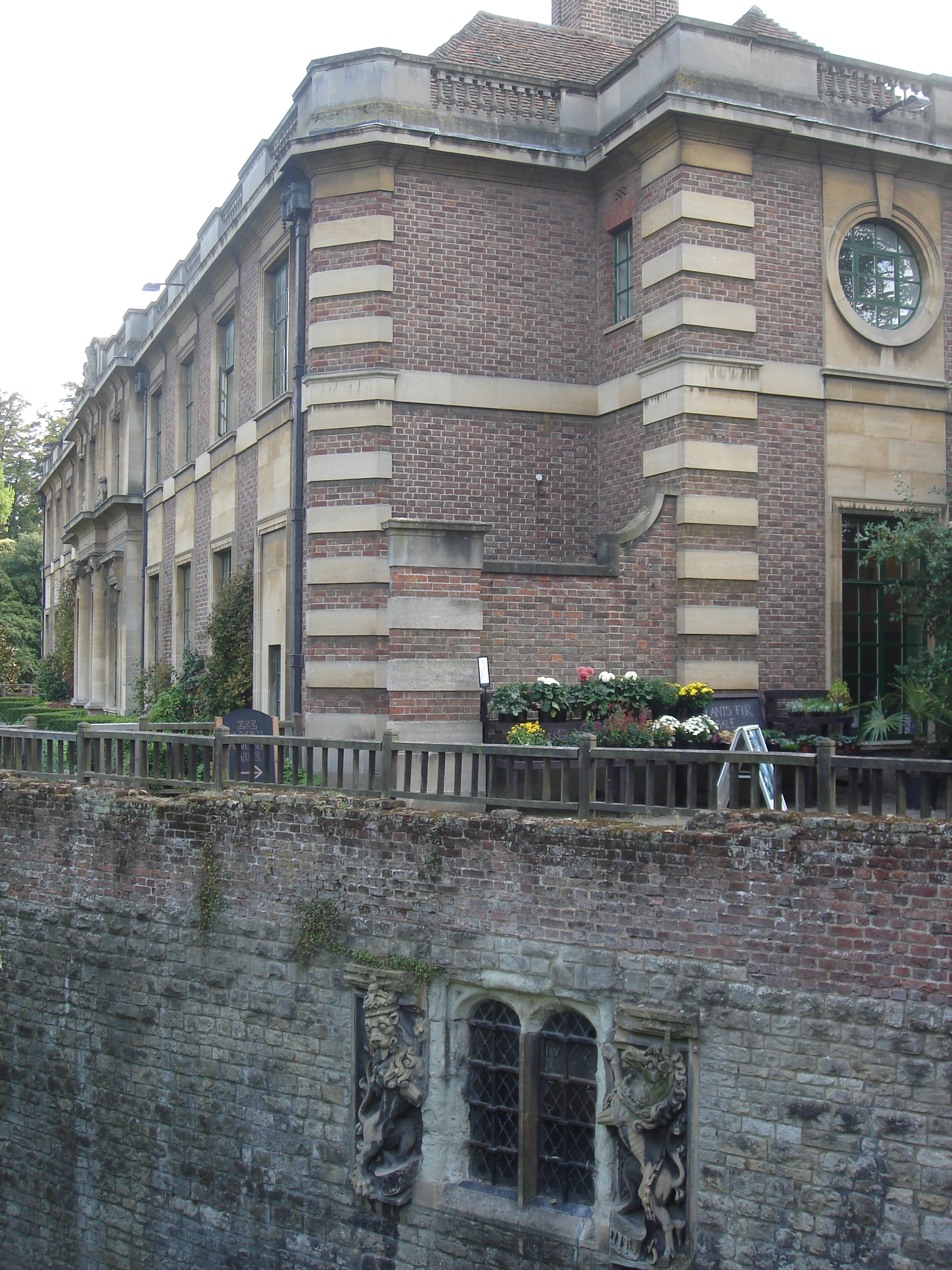
Part of Eltham Palace in Kent, where Richard sat out most of the parliament.

King Richard had not attended the parliament in person, having retired—possibly in anger—to the royal palace at Eltham, and he refused to obey its demands for impeachment. According to one contemporary chronicler, he declared he would not get rid of a kitchen scullion on the grounds that parliament asked him to. According to the author of another chronicle, the Eulogium Historiarum, he even tried to dissolve parliament at this point, but the Commons refused to leave. Richard's behaviour at this point, says the medievalist Phil Bradford, was "strongly reminiscent" of Edward II's attempts to frustrate his own parliaments earlier in the 14th century, a point not lost on the noble opposition in 1386.

=== Richard's absence ===
Until now, Richard had a good record in attending parliament: he had only missed one day in 1379, and now the Commons reported to him that they could achieve little without his presence. In response, the King sent for a deputation of forty of them to finalise discussions at Eltham. However, the St Albans Chronicler, Thomas Walsingham, reports that the King was planning to have the parliamentary group arrested or even ambushed and killed, and that the Mayor of London, Nicholas Exton had discovered the plan and warned them. This was described by Henry Knighton as the "occultus rumor", whereby the King intended to invite forty members of that parliament to a dinner—and then destroy them. (Note: Knighton's precise phrase is "nam occultus rumor aures secretius asperserat, quod eorum interitus per insidias imaginaretur", or "an evil rumour had been spread, that the King wished them ambushed and destroyed". Knighton's Chronicle, comments Alison McHardy, is "easily the most complete chronicle account" of the 1386 parliament, containing much detail—Gloucester and Arundel's mission to Eltham, for example—not contained elsewhere.) This may well have merely been a rumour, as Knighton suggests—perhaps reflecting the extent to which the King's reputation had declined—but parliament was taking no chances: they sent the King's uncle, the Duke of Gloucester and the Bishop of Ely in their stead. This indicates that parliament agreed that the King's absence would emasculate its negotiating power.

Gloucester and the bishop spoke, in Saul's words, "eloquently, if fictitiously" to the King on how they perceived his duty, which they supported by reference to ahistoric—"fictitious"—statutes and traditions. Saul describes these as "outrageous remarks"—they claimed to have these statutes in their possession at the time—while Tuck notes the implicit threat. Gloucester appears ultimately to have made a threat of deposition against Richard or at least raised the spectre of Edward II (under a supposedly "ancient law" which dictated that, without a King's presence in an annual parliament, the Commons could go home, facing no punishment for leaving parliamentary business unfinished—in this case, Richard's war tax). The Eulogium Historiarum chronicler also describes these events:

The king did not want to come to parliament. They even sent for that statute by which the middle Edward [Edward II] was judged, and under pain of that statute they compelled the king to attend.

The chronicler alleged that Richard even threatened to appeal to the King of France for aid against his domestic enemies, until the Duke and the Bishop said that the King of France himself was England's greatest enemy. According to Richard Grafton's chronicle:

The king aunswered by these wordes: Well, we do consider that our people and Commons go about to rise against us: wherefore we thinke we can do no better then to aske ayde of our Cosyn the French king, and rather submit us unto him, then unto our owne subjectes.

Lordes aunswered, Sir that counsaile is not best, but a way rather to bring you into daunger: For it is well knowen that the French king is your auncient enemie, and your greatest adversarie. And if he set foote once within your realme, he will rather dispoyle you, and invade you, and depose you from your estate royall, then put any hande to helpe you.

The lords reminded Richard that both Richard's father and grandfather had "toke great laboures uppon them... to conquere the realme of France", rather than appealing to it for assistance. Knighton also relates how, in parliament, the Lords sent for "the statute by which Edward [II] had been adjudged", which had forced the choice upon Edward in 1327 of either resigning the throne or his son, later Edward III, being disinherited. As a result of this manoeuvre Richard became melancholic, and agreed to return to parliament and accept the Commons' petitions.

In a final political misjudgement, the King had promoted de Vere from Earl of Oxford to Marquess of Dublin on 13 October. This enraged people all the more: Chris Given-Wilson, for example, argues that "there can be little doubt that few thought him worthy of the honour". The King eventually dismissed de la Pole as Chancellor ten days later, and appointed the Bishop of Ely the next day. Also dismissed alongside de la Pole were the Treasurer—the Bishop of Durham—and the Keeper of the Privy Seal, Walter Skirlaw. The Parliament Rolls of Medieval England (PROME) project, notes that at least two of Richard's proposed creations—John, Lord Neville and the under chamberlain to the royal household, Simon Burley, to the earldoms of Cumberland and of Huntingdon respectively—were so unpopular that the King was forced to withdraw them. De Vere's elevation was not ratified until December, perhaps further indicating its controversy.

Parliament was dissolved on 28 November. The remainder of the session was taken up with the establishment of another commission to oversee the King. PROME notes that "Richard was furious, and not surprisingly: at the age of nineteen, he was in effect being placed back in tutelage". (Note: This was the seventh such commission/council that parliament had attempted to impose on the King in five years.)

== Aftermath and King Richard's response ==
The Parliament had long-ranging consequences which would reverberate through the rest of Richard's reign. Saul has described it as "the worst political crisis of the reign to date" and a direct assault on the traditional principle that medieval kings governed by personal prerogative. It marks the first stage in an ongoing power struggle between Richard and a set of magnates who became known as the Lords Appellant. On 19 November, Richard appointed his councillors in Parliament as the Commons had requested; this was described as a "great and continual council," composed of eleven peers and three principal officials. They included Alexander Neville, Archbishop of York, William Courtenay, Archbishop of Canterbury, the Bishops Wykeham and Brantingham, Abbot Morice of Waltham Abbey, the Dukes of York and Gloucester, the Earl of Arundel, and Lords Cobham, Scrope and Devereaux. However, Richard was also able to limit their terms of office to a year only, as well as to ensure that the majority of the members were men who already had a history of loyalty to him. This amounted to a concession from Parliament; further, except for the Duke of Gloucester and the Earl of Arundel, none of the future Appellants were appointed. The Commons did not appear to believe the King to be sufficiently restrained by these measures and continued to call for further concessions from the Crown.

Parliament had concluded, almost immediately, that Richard was denouncing the appointed council when he made it clear that he would consult only when absolutely necessary, and preferably not at all. Following his impeachment, de la Pole had his royal grants of land reversed (although retaining his earldom) and was sentenced to imprisonment, probably in Corfe Castle. The King soon overturned these judgments; not only was de la Pole released, he joined the King for the Christmas festivities at Windsor later that year. Richard is recorded as having treated him with "ostentatious warmth". In New Year 1387, the King left London for a prolonged period on what contemporaries called his "gyration" around the country. (Note: The word gyrare is used by the contemporary chronicler Henry Knighton.) His priority was to consolidate and expand his support in the regions, mostly in the Midlands where loyalty to the Crown was particularly strong. Richard ignored his Parliament-imposed council and, while he was out of London, held councils of his own. Since the royal commission was unable to follow him everywhere, this had the effect of removing the royal household from their oversight.

By August 1387, Richard was in Shrewsbury, where he summoned the royal justices. Presenting to them a number of "Questions for the Judges", Richard intended establishing once and for all the parameters and extents of the liberties and prerogatives of the Crown. Moreover, he wanted an explicit condemnation that those responsible for the weakening of his power should be regarded as traitors with a ruling that, therefore, they should die as traitors. Michael de la Pole was personally involved in both drawing up the questions for the judges and subsequently attesting to them. Most importantly, he intended to establish whether the law passed imposing a council upon him was "derogatory... to the lord King." Richard clearly intended, despite the constraints Parliament had set on his authority, to regain political pre-eminence. The judges gave him the answers he required, although the role that Chief Justice Robert Tresilian played in the proceedings is unclear. According to one contemporary, de la Pole personally threatened Tresilian with execution if he refused to seal the document. On the other hand, argues Saul, Tresilian's subsequent loyalty to the King suggests it was Tresilian who drafted the questions to his judges. Saul describes him as "a thinker of some originality", who deliberately turned what had up until then been solely a political controversy in Parliament into a legal dispute to be resolved in court. (Note: Saul notes that, in the long term, allowing courts to comment on political questions was a step towards the rudiments of constitutional law. In the short term, however, "it had a less lofty significance", allowing Richard to attack his opponents juridically with the most heinous of all offences: high treason.) The King's campaign received further encouragement when Archbishop Neville resigned from the parliamentary council and re-pledged his allegiance to Richard, and by August 1387, de la Pole had returned to his position as the King's closest adviser, entering London with the King on his return to the capital in November that year.

=== Later conflict ===
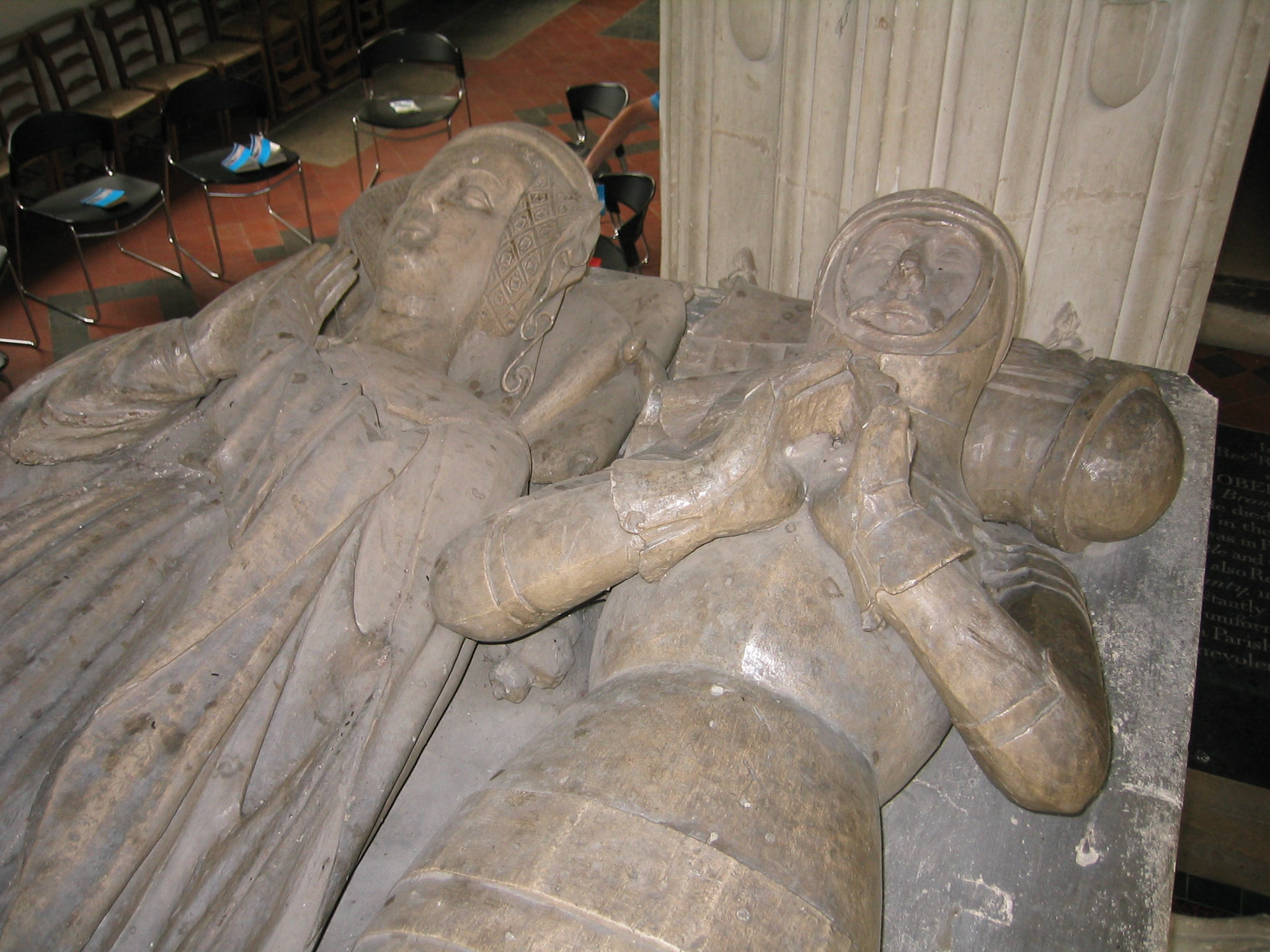
Tomb of the son of Richard's favourite, also called Michael de la Pole, in St Andrew's Church, Wingfield, Suffolk.

The Wonderful Parliament has been described as setting "the political stage for the rest of Richard's reign". As the first outright conflict between the King and his magnates, Richard, looking back in 1397, personally saw it as more damaging to him than the 1388 Merciless Parliament. While it was the King's first political defeat, it was not to be his last. Richard's defiant response to the 1386 parliament, and attempts to convict its promoters of treason, turned, says the scholar Alison McHardy, "the king's critics from angry into desperate men". This ultimately led to the Battle of Radcot Bridge on 19 December 1387 between troops loyal to Richard, led by de Vere, and an army captained by Henry Bolingbroke, Earl of Derby. Bolingbroke won, and de Vere fled into exile. Then the following year's Parliament ordained the exile or executions of several royal supporters. Palmer has commented that "it is generally recognised that all the constitutional and political troubles of Richard II's reign can be traced back to the Wonderful Parliament".

Although the court party was swept from power in 1386—when, as J. S. Roskell put it, "the exercise of royal authority was virtually handed over to a parliamentary commission"—Richard had a "violent reaction" to the proceedings. Roskell also suggests that the affair was not so much an argument about who should rule, King or Parliament, as the answer to that being anyone other than the King would have been anachronistic. Rather, it was regarding whose attitude towards Parliament would prevail: the King, who saw Parliament as being a tool of royal authority, or Parliament, who saw themselves in an advisory role to the King. In 1388, a number of men close to the King, including Burley and the Mayor of London, Nicholas Brembre were hanged at Tyburn, while Tresilian was discovered hiding in sanctuary in Westminster Abbey. He was dragged into court with cries of 'We have him!' from the mob and, having already been convicted by the Lords Appellant, was summarily hanged naked before his throat was cut. De la Pole avoided such a fate. Even before Radcot Bridge, he had escaped to Calais, where his brother Edmund was Captain. This was to no avail, as the governor of the town, Sir William Beauchamp, returned him under armed escort to the King. From there—with royal permission—he made his way to Hull and took ship for Dordrecht. Arriving in Paris by December 1387, he died there in 1389 and, in the same year, Richard resumed his personal authority.

Although the epithet 'wonderful' is widely applied to this Parliament—stemming from the use of the Latin mirabilis by a contemporary chronicler to describe it—the term was originally coined to refer to the 1388 assembly. Although the Parliament of 1386 was described by Favent as having "wrought wonders," recent scholarship has been more critical. (Note: For example, George B. Stowe, writing in 1985, noted that "in the proceedings of the 'Wonderful Parliament' of October 1386 historians have detected the beginning of the end for Richard II", while more recently Clementine Oliver wrote that "historians have long regarded the Wonderful Parliament as the first significant political defeat suffered by Richard Il, sparking the bitter feud... that would come to shape the ruinous course of the king's reign".) John McCall and George Rudisill have argued that the Parliament demonstrated the "inanity of the proceedings and the vindictiveness that motivated them, the weakness of the King's government and the inability of anyone to do anything about it". It is no surprise, argues the Parliament Rolls of Medieval England project, that for the rest of Richard's reign, England "witnessed a political crisis such as had not been seen since the reign of Edward II".

The councils imposed by Parliament on Richard set a precedent which continued into the reign of his successor Henry IV, who deposed Richard in 1399. Henry was frequently ill in his later years which led to the reintroduction of a form of conciliar government based on the models described in 1385 and 1386.

== Chaucer's attendance and literary depictions ==
One member of the Wonderful Parliament was Geoffrey Chaucer, elected as shire knight for Kent. Chaucer by that point was well known both as a poet and as a public servant. Although his personal position regarding the events he witnessed is unknown, it has been suggested that he used the experience of this and the Merciless Parliament (which he was also elected to attend) as a basis for his work The Parliament of Foules. Literary scholar Britton Harwood has suggested that Chaucer based his character Symkyn—who is portrayed as "absurdly pretentious" before public humiliation—in The Reeve's Tale on de la Pole, who, like Chaucer, had a non-aristocratic background before attaining gentility. Chaucer's attendance has also been suggested as having influenced the Trojan Court scene in his later epic poem, Troilus and Criseyde, in which it is the assembled Parliament, rather than the King or the Trojan princes, that is responsible for the subsequent political calamity.

Recent commentators have suggested that his depictions show how Chaucer was "astounded at the vindictiveness of some of [the King's] political adversaries". This work is a more cynical treatment of parliamentary affairs than his previous Parliament of Foules. Chaucer was probably personally affected by the goings-on of the 1386 parliament and particularly its bloody consequences, it has been argued, as he was not only a royal appointee to his post of London customs' controller, but also a personal friend to some of those under attack, such as Burley, with whom Chaucer had worked since 1376 and was probably a close friend. Chaucer may also have felt personally endangered by the attack on the King's prerogative. One petition, for example, presented to the Parliament demanded that customs controllers of the ports be dismissed from their posts on account of their "manifest corruption". Chaucer was customs controller of the Port of London, from which the leader of the opposition, Gloucester, was owed £500; as a result, speculates Peter Ackroyd, Chaucer may have felt the accusation of corruption personally targeted him.
