= Thomas Usk =

14th-century English civil servant

Thomas Usk (died 4 March 1388) was an English civil servant and writer, briefly appointed the under-sheriff of London by Richard II in 1387, but hanged in the following year. He was the author of The Testament of Love, formerly ascribed to Chaucer.

== Biography ==
Born in London, Usk was a petty bureaucrat, scrivener, and author. The Westminster Chronicle records his inglorious death.

Usk had been servant to John Northampton when the latter was Lord Mayor of London from 1381 to 1383. In 1384, he was arrested and released by Northampton's rival Nicholas Brembre in exchange for informing against Northampton, for he had no desire, he said, to be "a stinking martyr." This earned him the enmity of the party led by the Duke of Gloucester.

When Gloucester's party gained power through the Merciless Parliament Usk was prosecuted in 1388 and sentenced to be drawn, hanged, and beheaded, with his head put up over Newgate.

The Testament of Love is an allegorical prose work written in prison to seek aid. Walter Skeat found that the initial letters of the sections formed an acrostic saying, "MARGARET OF VIRTU HAVE MERCI ON TSKNVI." Properly decoded, the last word is "THINUSK," or "thin[e] Usk."

Usk had been a Lollard, but he was brought back to the Roman Catholic Church while in prison. He was hanged at Tyburn in March 1388, and after his body was taken down it was decapitated after thirty strokes of the axe.

== Author of The Testament of Love and Contemporary of Chaucer ==
Born in London, he is the author of The Testament of Love, which was once thought to be by Geoffrey Chaucer. Usk was a Collector of Customs from 1381 to 1384, when Geoffrey Chaucer was the Comptroller of Customs. If they were not familiar with each other, Usk at least was familiar with Chaucer's poetry. In The Testament of Love, the god of Love praises "mine own true servant, the noble philosophical poet in English" who had written a poem on Troilus (i.e. Chaucer).

== Works ==
- The Testament of Love Ed. by R. Allen Shoaf. TEAMS Middle English Text Series.
