= 1377 London riots =

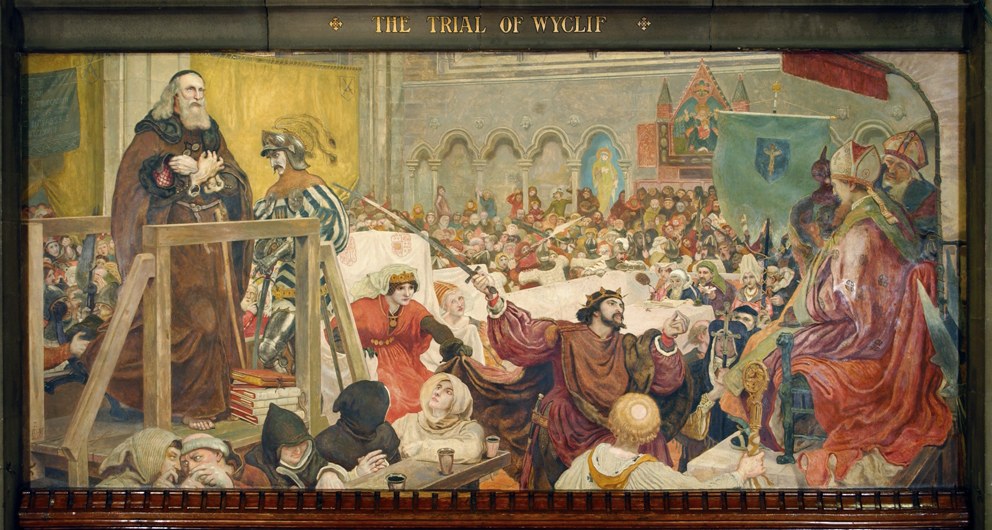
Mural depicting John Wycliffe's trial by Ford Madox Brown. Gaunt's physical threats towards the Bishop of London were a major provocation for the riot

The 1377 London riots were riots in London against John of Gaunt's high handed behaviour towards London and his defence of the reformer John Wycliffe. They were part of the wider London guild conflicts of the 1370s and 1380s.

== Background ==
In the last years of Edward III, his third son John of Gaunt had become the effective ruler of England. He was unpopular both in London and in the wider country. Edward the Black Prince, Edward's heir, led a reform effort that culminated in the Good Parliament, which put in a number of reforms in the management of the country generally unfavourable to Gaunt, including impeaching his key London ally Richard Lyons and bringing in a new system of electing the Court of Common Council.

However towards the end of the Good Parliament the Black Prince died, leading the way for John of Gaunt to reassert control over government.

== Bad Parliament ==
Part of Gaunt's reaction was to call a new Parliament, known as the Bad Parliament packed with his supporters aiming to repeal the reform measures of the Good Parliament and to reassert Gaunt's control over the government.

Within this Parliament Gaunt proposed on 19 February to replace the Lord Mayor of London, elected by the citizens of London, with a captain appointed by the crown. At the same time he proposed giving the Marshal of England - at that time his ally Henry Percy - power of arrest within the city.

== Insulting the Bishop of London ==
This was also coupled with insulting behaviour from Gault and Percy towards William Courtenay the Bishop of London at the trial of John Wycliffe a few hours after his proposals in Parliament. Wycliffe believed that church wealth was damaging to the church, which coincided with Gaunt's views that church wealth could fund the government's military needs. However Wycliffe was correctly suspected by much of the English population of being a more advanced heretic from church dogma than were apparent in his writings at the time which made him unpopular, including with the population of London.

Wycliffe's attack on church wealth in De civili dominio led to him being summoned to a church convocation before William Courtenay, the Bishop of London, on 19 February 1377 at St Paul's Cathedral. Wycliffe was accompanied to St Pauls by Gaunt and Percy and a number of armed supporters. A hostile crowd gathered at the church, and at the entrance and there was an angry exchange between the Bishop of London and John of Gaunt about whether Wycliffe could sit.

Gaunt declared that he would humble the pride of the English clergy and their partisans, hinting at the intent to secularise the possessions of the Church. He started to trade insults with Courtenay, although when Courtenay won this Gaunt moved to physical threats. It was widely believed at the time - although it's doubted by many historians - that Gaunt was overheard saying to Percy that he would take the Bishop out by his hair. The assembly broke up and Gaunt and his partisans departed with Wycliffe.

== Riots ==
Riots started in London the following day. Gaunt's arms were reversed or defaced wherever they were displayed. Protestors also pasted up lampoons on Gaunt's supposedly dubious birth. Gaunt and Percy was forced to take refuge with Joan of Kent, the King's mother, across the Thames, while his Savoy Palace only just escaped looting.

During the riots the Duke's coat of arms was reversed in Cheapside, which was used to signal that a man was a condemned traitor.

== Aftermath ==
Due to Gaunt's uncontested power in the government of the ailing Edward III after the death of Edward the Black Prince, the City authorities tried to make peace. Gaunt failed to prevent the deputation of the citizens, headed by the former mayor John Philipot, from getting an audience with Edward who treated them well. But Gaunt insisted that the King depose Adam Stable as mayor, which was done on 21 March. The citizens of London at once replaced Stable with Nicholas Brembre. Like Richard Lyons, Brembre was a rich merchant although ironically he and his faction of rich merchants, the victuallers, would become enemies of Gaunt while those from the "lesser trades" would become Gaunt's allies.

In an attempt to preserve London's autonomy in late 1377 new charter for London was agreed. However a few months later there was a resurgence of mob violence against a king's uncle when a mob broke into the London home of Thomas of Woodstock, Duke of Gloucester which led to the charter's revocation.

== Sources ==
- Castor, Helen (2024). The Eagle and the Hart: The Tragedy of Richard II and Henry IV.
- Cohn, Samuel K. (2013). Popular Protest in Late Medieval English Towns. Cambridge: Cambridge University Press. ISBN 978-1-107-02780-0.
- Conti, Alessandro (6 May 2025). "John Wyclif". Stanford Encyclopedia of Philosophy.
- Lechler, Gotthard Victor (1904). John Wycliffe and His English Precursors. Religious Tract Society. ISBN 9780404162351.
- Prescott, Andrew (23 September 2004). "Brembre, Sir Nicholas". Oxford Dictionary of National Biography (online ed.). Oxford University Press. (Subscription, Wikipedia Library access or UK public library membership required.)
- Sumption, J. (19 March 2009). The Hundred Years War 3: Divided Houses. London: Faber & Faber. ISBN 978-0-571-13897-5.
- Rashdall, Hastings (1900). "Wycliffe, John". Dictionary of National Biography. Vol. 63.
- Urquhart, Francis (1912). "John Wyclif" . In Herbermann, Charles (ed.). Catholic Encyclopedia. Vol. 15. New York: Robert Appleton Company.
- Workman, H. B. (1926). John Wyclif: A Study of the English Medieval Church. Vol. I. Oxford: Clarendon. OCLC 769417789.
