= 16th Parliament of King Richard II =

The 16th Parliament of King Richard II, also known as the Cambridge Parliament, was a session of the Parliament of England held at Barnwell Priory, Cambridge in 1388.

== Background ==
The Parliament was held in the shadow of the Lords Appellant's coup d'état at the Merciless Parliament in February of that year. The power of the Appellants rested on popular support from the House of Commons, but by the end of 1388 this support had begun to wane. It's argued that after the Appellants had destroyed various members of Richard II's court they ceased to concern themselves with the governance of England and that the appellants were divided.

The Parliament was needed as the government were running out of money partly due to failed military ventures.

== Proceedings ==
The Parliament was held between 10 September and 17 October 1388.

The principal business of the Cambridge Parliament was the examination of the conduct of government in the aftermath of the Merciless Parliament. The Commons presented a series of complaints criticising the Lords Appellant for ineffective administration and their failure to provide stable governance once their political enemies had been eliminated. Although the Appellants retained control of government, the tone of the Commons’ petitions indicated a growing dissatisfaction with their rule and a decline in the popular support that had sustained them earlier in the year.

They granted only a single fifteenth and tenth in tax, and this was for defence for the north rather than also for ventures in France.

The Statute of Cambridge which limited labour mobility after the Peasants' Revolt was passed at this parliament.

As part of the Cambridge Parliament, guilds across England were required to submit returns detailing their ordinances and membership, producing the Guild Returns of 1388, an important contemporary source for the study of medieval English craft organisation and urban society.

== Aftermath ==
In 1389 John of Gaunt returned to England, leading to a gradual consolidation of Richard II's power and the eventual exile and execution of most of the Appellants in the 1390s until Henry Bolingbroke, one of the appellants, usurped Richard's throne in 1399.

== See also ==
- Acts Passed in the Cambridge Parliament

== Sources ==
- Bone, J. H. A. (March 1877). "Old English Guilds and Trade Unions". The Atlantic.
- Castor, Helen (2024). The Eagle and the Hart: The Tragedy of Richard II and Henry IV.
- Tuck, J. A. (1969). "The Cambridge Parliament, 1388". The English Historical Review. 84 (331): 225–243.
