= Merciless Parliament =

English parliamentary session

←	Wonderful Parliament	16th Parliament of King Richard II	→
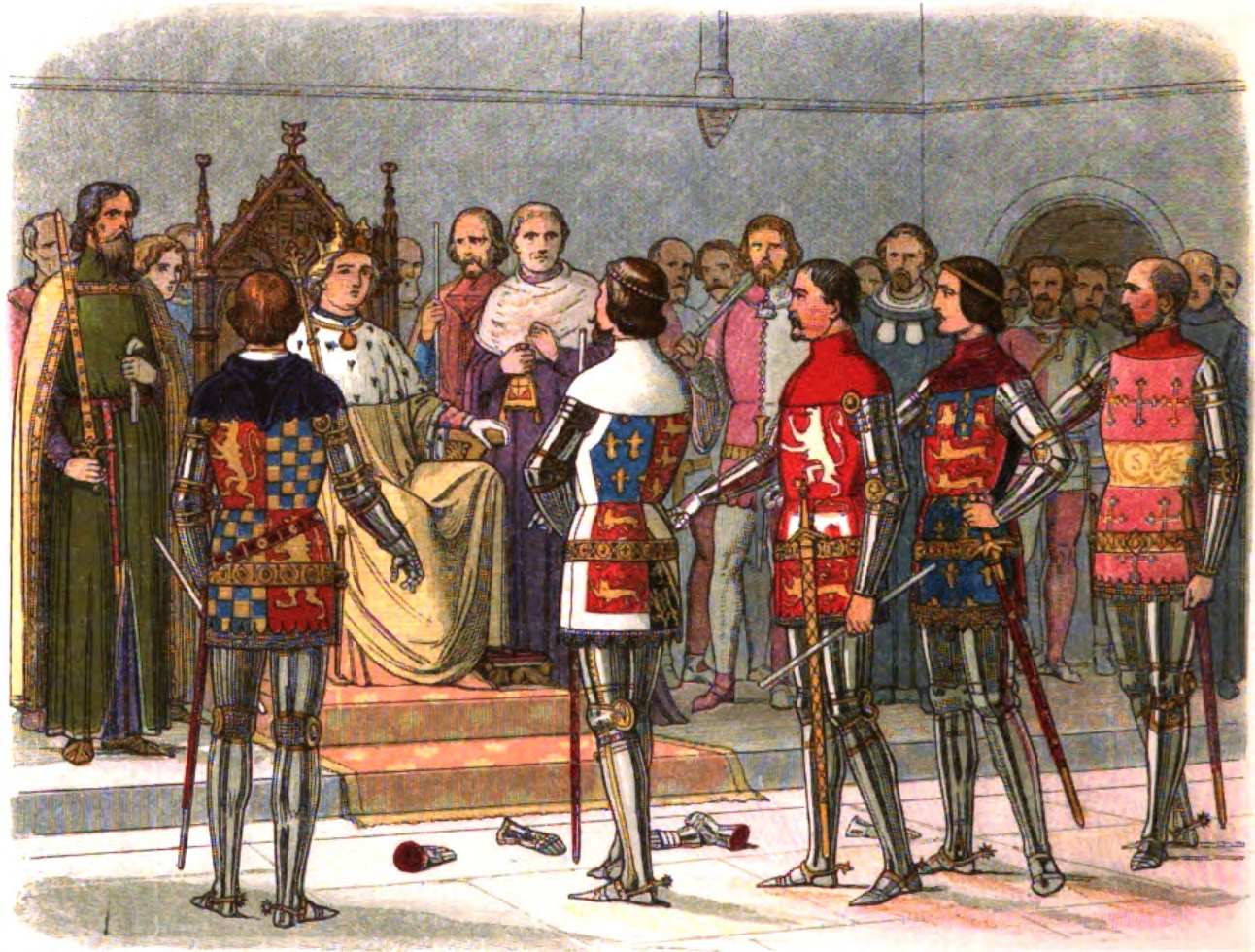
- The Lords Appellant throw down their gauntlets before Richard II of England, to stop him speaking in defence of Nicholas Brembre

Overview
- Legislative body: Parliament of England
- Term: 3 February 1388 – 4 June 1388

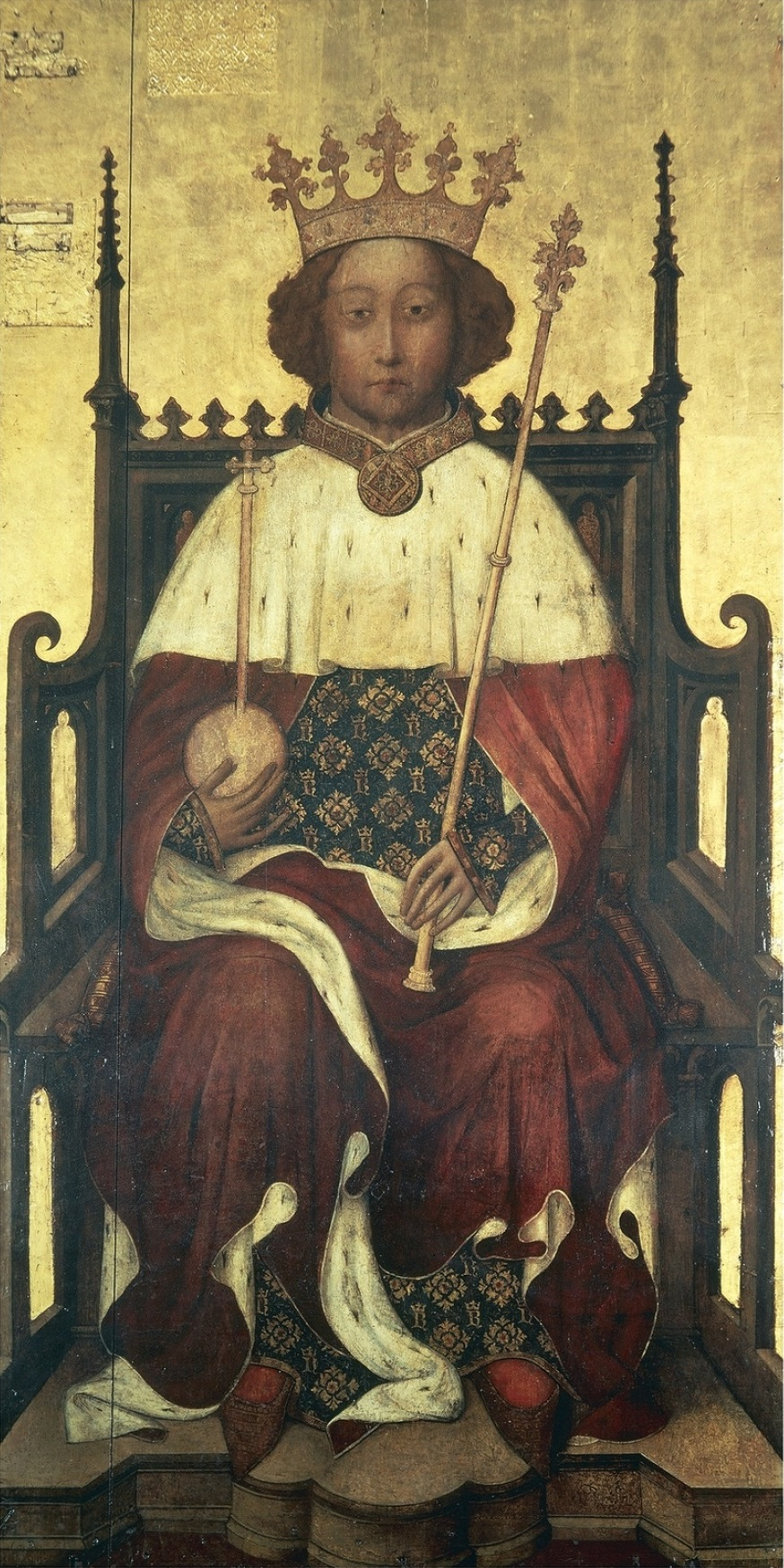
Richard II of England, who presided over the session

The Merciless Parliament was an English parliamentary session lasting from 3 February to 4 June 1388, at which many members of King Richard II's court were convicted of treason. The session was preceded by a period in which Richard's power was revoked and the kingdom placed under the regency of the Lords Appellant. Richard had launched an abortive military attempt to overthrow the Lords Appellant and negotiate peace with the kingdom of France so he could focus all his resources against his domestic enemies. The Lords Appellant counteracted the attempt and called the parliamentary session to expose his attempts to make peace. Parliament reacted with hostility and convicted almost all of Richard's advisers of treason. Most were executed and a few exiled. Parliament was dissolved after violence broke out in Kent and the Duke of York and his allies began objecting to some executions. The term "merciless" was coined by Augustinian chronicler Henry Knighton.

== Background ==
The kingdom of England was in the midst of the Hundred Years' War with the kingdom of France, and the English had been consistently losing territory to the French since 1369. The losses were a politically sensitive topic and led to a shift in the English position after the death of Edward III, with his successor Richard II favoring peace while many of the landed nobility wanted to continue the war. The Wonderful Parliament in 1386 blamed the young King Richard's advisers for the military failures and accused them of misappropriating funds intended for the war. They authorized a commission of nobles known as the Lords Appellant to effectively take over management of the kingdom and act as Richard's regents. Richard refused to acknowledge the authority of the commission but lacked the power to challenge them. He began to devise a plan to secure his authority over the kingdom by raising an army among his allies and to do this he went on a "gyration" around the country to raise troops and escape the scrutiny of the Lords Appellant in London. To help with this he tried to negotiate a secret peace with France so he could focus all his military forces against his domestic enemies.

Richard began negotiations with the French in June 1387 using his agents in Hainault as intermediaries. He agreed to surrender all of England's possessions in northern France, including Calais, and make peace. In exchange, the French agreed to restore most of the Duchy of Aquitaine to Richard, provided he would pay homage to the king of France for it. Richard agreed to seal the treaty at a personal meeting with Charles VI of France. Richard's enemies soon learned of the attempt and decided to move against him to prevent the peace treaty from being formalised.

In August 1387, to establish a legal basis for overthrowing the appellants, Richard called seven judges of the superior courts to answer a series of questions regarding their legitimacy. Under significant duress, each of the judges agreed that the appellants had no authority and were guilty of treason and signed a statement authorizing their arrest. Armed with the legal ruling, Richard called the sheriffs of several counties to inform them they were no longer to answer to the Lords Appellant. Working with his ally Robert de Vere, Duke of Ireland and Earl of Oxford, an army was raised in Chester and reinforced with royal retainers from East Anglia, the Midlands and eastern Wales. Although rumored to his enemies to be an army of 20,000, it contained no more than 4,000 men. De Vere was put in command.

The Lords Appellant became aware of Richard's dealings with the French, and later of his attempt to raise an army. Rumours began to circulate that Richard had agreed to accept military support from France, and that he would place England under French military occupation. Thomas of Woodstock, Duke of Gloucester, and several lesser nobles mobilized an army of their retainers numbering 4,500 and marched on de Vere's army.

In December 1387, the two armies met at Radcot-on-Thames where the Lords Appellant's army won the Battle of Radcot Bridge against the forces of Robert de Vere. The victory placed the anti-Ricardian Lords Appellant in a position of incontestable strength. Richard fled Westminster for London and barricaded himself in the Tower of London. On 27 December the Lords Appellant's army reached the tower in full battle array and forced Richard to surrender. When the leading Appellants, the Duke of Gloucester (Thomas of Woodstock) and the Earls of Arundel, Warwick, Derby (Henry Bolingbroke, later Henry IV) and Nottingham, met with Richard on an improvised throne, they seized him and threatened to execute him for his dealings with France. Ultimately they decided against it, instead forcing him to call a session of Parliament.

== Session ==
The parliamentary session began on 3 February 1388. The term "Merciless Parliament" was first employed by a local chronicler, Henry Knighton, who was referring to the ruthless manner in which many were convicted and executed.

=== Purge of the Five Advisers ===
During the parliament, the Appellants pursued their earlier accusations against Richard and his inner circle, almost wholly unopposed. They levelled a series of charges against Richard's advisers, accusing them of offering to surrender English-held fortresses in France and widespread embezzlement from the treasury. Most of the charges were likely false.

This meant that a number of Richard's intimate associates, namely Michael de la Pole, Nicholas Brembre, Robert de Vere, Alexander Neville, and Chief Justice Robert Tresilian, were found guilty of "living in vice, deluding the said king ... embracing the mammon of iniquity for themselves". None were given formal trials. Neville was a bishop and spared execution, but all his assets were seized and he was exiled. The rest were ordered drawn and hanged.

However on 19 February 1388 after the verdict Robert Tresilian was discovered hiding in sanctuary in Westminster. He was dragged into court with cries of 'We have him!' from the mob and, as he was already convicted, was summarily executed, being hanged naked before his throat was cut.

=== Execution of Nicholas Brembre ===
Of the five advisesrs, only Nicholas Brembre, the former Lord Mayor of London, was available before the verdicts were passed. Brembre, a staunch loyalist of Richard's, had unsuccessfully attempted to raise forces within the City of London while Richard was nearby in the royal stronghold of the Tower of London. After fleeing London Brembre was captured in Wales and imprisoned first at Gloucester and then moved to the Tower of London.

On 17 February Brembre was taken from the Tower to the White Chamber to be tried before Parliament. He was refused a copy of the allegations and so entered the plea that he was "guilty of nothing". He was styled throughout the trial as the "so called knight of London". and his demand that as a knight he had the right to trial by combat was refused. Among the standard treason charges there was a specific charge that he had beheaded without trial twenty-two inmates of Newgate Prison at the "Foul Oke" in Kent.

When Richard attempted to speak in his ally's support, as the King traditionally had a right to do in treason trials, the Lords Appellant threw down their gauntlets joined by around 300 other Lords and Commoners in Parliament, a threat of armed rebellion. A committee of 12 noblemen headed by Edmund of Langley were deputised to examine the case but they claimed to find no case for a death penalty. The Lords Appellants next asked representatives of the London guilds to say if Brembre was guilty but this produced no result and on 20 February they called the City of London's mayor, recorder and aldermen who needed to be asked leading questions to give an answer that would suffice to be used to convict him and on the same day he was sentenced and hanged at Tyburn.

=== Purge of the Royal Household ===
The purge continued deep into the administration, dozens of retainers, clerks, chaplains, and secretaries to Richard were summarily condemned and executed. The seven judges who authorized Richard's actions under duress were arrested. The judges were the only men to be given formal trials before the House of Lords, but despite their pleas for leniency, they too were convicted and executed. As the purge continued, men less obviously involved in the plot were arrested. Richard's confessor, Thomas Rushhook, Bishop of Chichester, was accused of being involved in the plot, but the House of Lords refused to try him and the parliament adjourned on 6 March and resumed on 12 March.

The session continued through April and May as Richard's chamber knights were tried and executed. Richard's intermediaries who had been negotiating with France were discovered and executed. By the end of April, most of what remained of Richard's staff had fled to the countryside or left the country altogether and many were convicted in absentia. The session began to come to an end with the trial of a knight named Simon Burley, who was accused of involvement in the plot. He was a veteran of the war and had been an adviser of the Black Prince, Richard's father. He had friends among the nobility and was a close friend of Edmund Langley, Duke of York. Langley was an influential lord who represented a significant bloc, and rose to defend Burley. The Duke of Gloucester endorsed Burley's condemnation. The two men became increasingly hostile in the first week of May. The King, who was presiding during the entire session, rose for the first time to join the Duke of York in resisting the effort. Gloucester and the King began quarreling and nearly came to blows. Before the entire council, Gloucester informed the King that if he wished to retain his crown, he should stop attempting to defend his friends. The King gave in. Burley was condemned and executed. Gloucester brought Rushhook before Parliament again and he was convicted of treason and exiled to Ireland.

Among the members of King Richard's retinue to be condemned, were John Beauchamp of Holt, James Baret, and John Salisbury, who were all hanged and beheaded; Robert Bealknap (Belknap), Roger Fulthorp, William Burgh, John Locton and Sir John Cary Chief Baron of the Exchequer who were exiled to Ireland. Thomas Usk (author of The Testament of Love) and John Blake, members of Brembre's and Tresilian's households respectively, were also put to death.

=== War with France ===
At the session's start, the Lords Appellant repudiated all of Richard's deals with France. The commanders of the English garrisons in France were replaced with men loyal to the Appellants, who began to pursue an aggressive war policy. Parliament however, was unwilling to grant a significant tax grant to pay for military operations. On 21 February Parliament grudgingly agreed to a subsidy equal to half the normal subsidy granted, amounting to about £30,000 and authorized a fleet to be hired to patrol the English Channel for the year. Philip the Bold, Duke of Burgundy, acting as agent for the French government, sent emissaries requesting that the English abide by Richard's agreement, but they were sent away without a reply.

=== End of the Session ===
The Duke of York was furious over the treatment of Burley, threatening to break the coalition of lords, leading Gloucester to support ending the parliament. A series of peasant revolts broke out in Kent and southwest England, necessitating military action in late April. A second recess was agreed to after Easter and resumed on 20 May. The remainder of the session was spent dealing with financial issues and the parliament was finally dissolved on 4 June.

== Aftermath ==
After this virtual coup d'état, the Appellants continued to dominate English politics for the next year. Richard was effectively their puppet until the return of John of Gaunt from his Spanish campaigns in 1389. The power of the Appellants rested on popular support from the Commons in Parliament, but by the end of 1388 this support had already begun to wane. In the subsequent Parliament held at Cambridge in September 1388, the Commons were highly critical of the Appellants' record in government. Indeed, it has been argued that the Appellants were predominantly concerned with the task of destroying various members of Richard II's court, and after this objective had been achieved they ceased to concern themselves with the governance of England. Richard immediately began formulating plans for revenge and afterwards finally enacted a de facto peace with France with the Truce of Leulinghem. Most of the Appellants were executed during the 1390s. Gloucester was exiled to Calais where he was suffocated, probably on the orders of Richard. Bolingbroke and many other lords were eventually exiled. In 1399 Bolingbroke led a group of exiles back to England, seized the country, forced Richard to abdicate, and then starved Richard to death. Bolingbroke, Richard's cousin, was crowned Henry IV.

== See also ==
- Wonderful Parliament
- Truce of Leulinghem

== Sources ==
- Castor, Helen (2024). The Eagle and the Hart.
- Prescott, Andrew (23 September 2004). "Brembre, Sir Nicholas". Oxford Dictionary of National Biography (online ed.). Oxford University Press. (Subscription, Wikipedia Library access or UK public library membership required.)
- Round, John Horace (1886). "Brembre, Nicholas" . In Stephen, Leslie (ed.). Dictionary of National Biography. Vol. 6. London: Smith, Elder & Co.
- Sumption, Jonathan (2009). The Hundred Years War: Divided Houses. University of Pennsylvania Press. ISBN 978-0-8122-4223-2.
- Tuck, J. A. (1969). "The Cambridge Parliament, 1388". The English Historical Review. 84 (331): 225–234. doi:10.1093/ehr/LXXXIV.CCCXXXI.225. JSTOR 564518.
- Tuck, Anthony (1985). Crown and Nobility 1272–1461: Political Conflict in Late Medieval England. London: Fontana. ISBN 0-0068-6084-2.
- Rotuli Parliamentorum; ut et petitiones, et placita in Parliamento (in Anglo-Norman and Latin). Vol. 3. London: Record Commission / Great Britain Parliament. 1767. OCLC 695983551.
