= Adam Stable =

14th-century Lord Mayor of London

Adam Stable or Adam Staple was Lord Mayor of London who also served as an MP for the City of London in 1373. He was a Mercer.

He had been convicted in the 1360s for threatening a jury and which may have meant that he was involved in an opposition faction agitating against the Crown.

He was elected by a new electoral system brought in under the anti-John of Gaunt atmosphere surrounding the Good Parliament that I'm London was seen as favouring the lesser trades. He was deposed in 1377 in the aftermath of riots against John of Gaunt to placate Gaunt and was replaced by the rich merchant Nicholas Brembre.

== Sources ==
- Nightingale, P. (1989). "Capitalists, Crafts and Constitutional Change in Late Fourteenth-Century London". Past & Present. 124: 3–35. doi:10.1093/past/124.1.3.
- Prescott, Andrew (23 September 2004). "Brembre, Sir Nicholas". Oxford Dictionary of National Biography (online ed.). Oxford University Press. (Subscription, Wikipedia Library access or UK public library membership required.)
- Round, John Horace (1886). "Brembre, Nicholas" . In Stephen, Leslie (ed.). Dictionary of National Biography. Vol. 6. London: Smith, Elder & Co.
