= Nicholas Brembre =

Lord Mayor of London, 1377, 1383–1385

Sir Nicholas Brembre

Lord Mayor of London
- In office 1377–1378
- Preceded by: Adam Stable
- Succeeded by: William Walworth
- In office 1383–1386
- Preceded by: John Northampton
- Succeeded by: Nicholas Exton

Member of the Parliament of England for the City of London
- In office 1383–1384

Personal details
- Born: c. 14th century Unknown
- Died: 20 February 1388 Tyburn, London, England
- Cause of death: Execution by hanging
- Spouse: Idonia Stodey
- Occupation: Merchant, politician
- Profession: Grocer and wool exporter
- Known for: Ally of Richard II of England; executed by the Merciless Parliament

Sir Nicholas Brembre (died 20 February 1388) was an important figure in late 14th-century London and an ally of King Richard II during his dispute with his rebel Lords Appellant in the 1380s. Nothing is known of Brembre’s birth, but he was probably of humble origins. At some point, he became a merchant and joined the Grocers' Company, an important London guild. He became extremely wealthy through involvement in the wool trade. His wealth enabled him to make substantial cash loans to the Crown, and this, in turn, granted him access to the highest levels of government.

Brembre was highly active in London’s civic political life, serving on commissions, as an alderman, sheriff and for four terms as Mayor of London. Much of the latter years were spent in a bitter dispute with a mercantile rival, John Northampton, who also became Mayor. Northampton attacked the traditional processes of city politics, including the traditional monopolies of the major guilds, and this became a source of both political and physical unrest in London. Brembre eventually managed to overturn Northampton's mayoral policies and get his rival arrested and expelled from the city. Brembre was also elected Member of Parliament for the City of London.

Following his last term as Mayor, he became increasingly identified with the court party against the rebels, whose ire he earned when he attempted to raise an army against them, in the King's name. The Appellants eventually gained control of Richard's government and proceeded to dismantle the King's household, many of whom were arrested and executed during the Merciless Parliament of 1388. This included Brembre, who, accused of treason, corruption and judicial murder—and despite the King's personal support—was hanged at Tyburn on 20 February that year.

== Political background ==
=== London ===
The historian Michael Hicks has described late-medieval London as "the largest port, the largest market and retail outlet for luxuries and manufacture, and the largest employer" in Late Medieval England. Nationally and financially, it was the most important trading post in the country, and in the late medieval period was handling over 60 per cent of English trade abroad. Throughout the period, maintaining control of—and influence in―the city was of fundamental importance for every monarch. (Note: "London was, moreover, the capital of England in part because of its proximity to Westminster. So kings processed through the city before their coronations and ... London crowds provided the required collaudatio for usurpers such as Henry IV in 1399 and Edward IV in 1461".) For their part, London's citizens benefited from proximity to royal administration, justice, and patronage, with Parliament and the King's Council at Westminster. The city, though, was also hit heaviest by the King's poll taxes of 1376–1381, damaging the King's relations with the city.

=== Relations with the crown ===
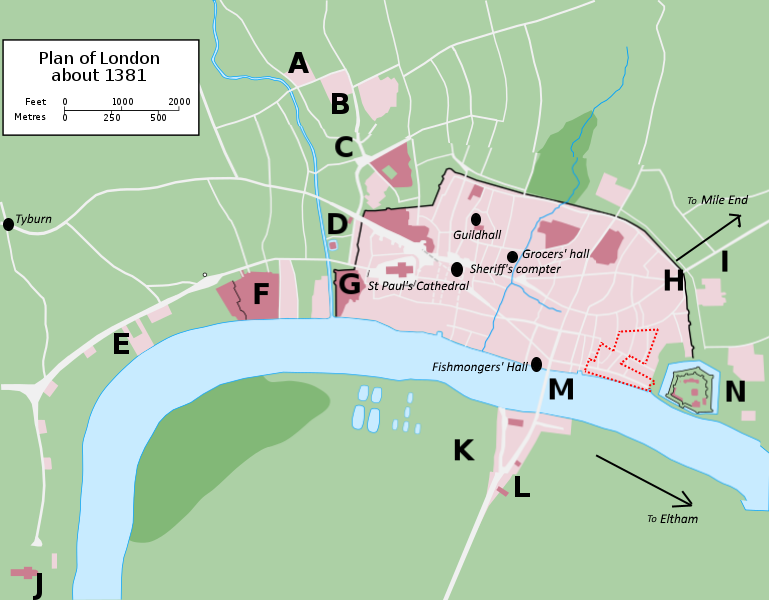
Plan of London about 1381

London was governed and administered by men from its merchant class, who were organised by their trades into different guilds (or misteries). These men, among whom Brembre was numbered, formed London's political upper class. They filled the offices of alderman, sheriff, and Mayor, and governed through the Common Council. The council was omnicompetent, and dealt with the city's complex and often delicate relations with the King and royal government. The city was politically turbulent at this time. (Note: Particularly following the Good Parliament of 1376. Barron points out that actually, "for most of its history, London had been turbulent".) Although a contemporary chronicler, Jean Froissart, believed Richard II favoured London at the expense of the rest of the kingdom, it is probable that King and city had poor opinions of the other. But, they had to live with each other: the Crown depended on the wealth of London's merchants for the subsidies and loans they provided, and the city relied on the King to protect its trade abroad and its liberties at home.

Relations were not only strained between city and Crown, but also suffered internecine tension, having been riven with factional strife since the late 1370s. Always prone to violence, the city had become increasingly so by the early 1370s. This had several causes, including a shortage of bullion and ready cash, the aftermath of plague outbreaks with concomitant depopulation, followed by different guilds vying for power, combined with a high level of immigration and an as-yet undeveloped sense of community solidarity. Internal tension was exacerbated by weak central government, owing to Edward III's last years being characterised by illness and popular discontent, and his successor, Richard, being a minor. By 1381, London's ruling class was itself engaged in a bitter internal feud for political dominance on the council and was thus unstable and divided. These issues were to influence city politics throughout Brembre's lifetime, until Richard lost his throne in 1399. Brembre was part of a merchant capitalist party in city politics which was known pejoratively as victuallers. (Note: The label "victualler" associated Brembre et al. with the then-high price of food in London; historian Barbara Hanawalt describes it as being part of a smear campaign.) The two groups were roughly aligned along guild lines, with Brembre representing the trading and non-productive victualling guilds - primarily the Vintners, Fishmongers and Grocers - against the artisanal labouring guilds, Brembre's group effectively controlled city government.

== Early life ==
It is unknown when Nicholas Brembre was born, and nothing is known of his early life or background, although he was likely of relatively humble origins, possibly, according to the early-19th-century antiquarian Edward Hasted, a son of one John Brembre. His most recent biographer, Andrew Prescott, has speculated that Brembre was related to Sir Thomas Brembre (also Bramber), an influential and wealthy Chancery clerk, receiver of the King's chamber and associate of the courtier Guy Brian. By 1369, Nicholas Brembre had married Idonia, the eldest daughter and coheir of the oligarch Vintner John Stodey, to whom Brembre appears to have been close, in 1371, for example, standing surety to Stodey over the latter's grant of a wardship and receiving custody of Stodey's youngest daughter, Joan, on Stodey's death. Brembre's marriage cemented his position in the upper echelons of London society. He established his primary residence as a mansion near Knightrider Street, not far from the Grocers' Company headquarters. Brembre also amassed a considerable property portfolio; tenements in the city were worth around £60 (equivalent to £61,800 in 2025), and included, per historian Sylvia L. Thrupp, "two large houses and several blocks of shops, four cellars, eleven chambers, two stables, a wharf, and a crane". He also purchased manors in Kent, such as at Mereworth, Maplescomb and West Peckham.

== Career ==
At a date now unknown, but probably not before 1365, Brembre joined and re-founded the Grocers' Company, although his primary business interests were in the wool trade. He became the biggest exporter of wool in London by 1365, when he traded over 1,400 sacks. His marriage also brought him close links to other merchants, particularly among the Merchants of the Staple and the various victualling companies. He was still a large exporter of wool in 1380 both from London (Note: Brembre was the third largest exporter to Calais with 286 sacks, and although this was much less than 1365 for context the then Mayor of the Staple, fishmonger William Walworth exported only 11.) and Hull. (Note: In 1379 he exported at least 66 sacks of wool from Kingston upon Hull)

Brembre first entered politics in 1372 after an English naval defeat at La Rochelle left English wool exports undefended. He was elected one of the two Sheriffs of the City of London and an alderman for the ward his home ward Bread Street which may have been the result of a deal with John Northampton. There had been rioting in the city shortly before his election. He was to be an Alderman office on five occasions, and still held the office on his death. He may have been motivated to do so through commercial concerns; the recent English defeat at the Battle of La Rochelle gave France control of the Bay of Biscay and allowed France to disrupt the safe passage of trade between England, Gascony and Spain. (Note: As a result, trade could now only take place under the protection of massive escorts, and a heavy levy was placed on wine imports to pay for them.) This endangered both London's trade and its food supply. In 1373, Brembre was elected Mayor of the Westminster Staple, which furthered his business interests and allowed him to make new commercial contacts.

Brembre maintained close relations with the leading merchants of the day, such as the Mercer John Pyel―to whose son Brembre stood godfather—and John Fressh, who regularly brokered Brembre's wool at the Middelburg Staple. Brembre was also on good terms with the wealthy and influential Fishmonger, John Philipot, with whom he had been elected sheriff in 1372; Brembre arranged the marriage of Philipot to Brembre's sister-in-law, Margaret Stodey. He was connected to Geoffrey Chaucer who as Comptroller of Customs was responsible for supervising the accounts of the Keepers of the Customs, including Brembre, who had been appointed in around 1372 as a collector of the wool subsidy for the Port of London. A commons petition to the 1388 parliament suggests that this office was popularly seen as a sinecure for those willing to take bribes and other corrupt practices. Still, the position also strengthened Brembre's influence among the London citizenry. He also maintained close links with leading government administrators, such as John Fitznichol, who had long been associated with Edward III's son-in-law John, Duke of Brittany, and who in 1384 married Philipot's widow, Brembre's sister-in-law, probably through Brembre's influence.

Brembre has been described as part of a "new and ... ambitious generation" that established itself in the royal circle from Richard's coronation—what Favent called gubernatores et proximi conciliarii regis—and as such Brembre became a royal favourite early on. He gained entry to the royal circle by virtue of several large loans to the Crown, which continued over the course of his career. In 1382, he lent Richard over £1300 (equivalent to £1,291,600 in 2023), in December 1384 nearly £1000 (equivalent to £989,400 in 2025) and this was followed the following year later by £666 (equivalent to £686,000 in 2025). In 1387 he helped fund Richard's "gyration" around the Midlands, Brembre also organised large corporate loans from the city to the Crown, beginning Richard's reign with one of £10000 (equivalent to £9,867,600 in 2025) and one in 1378 of £5000 (equivalent to £4,933,800 in 2025).

== Mayoralty and political career ==
=== First term ===
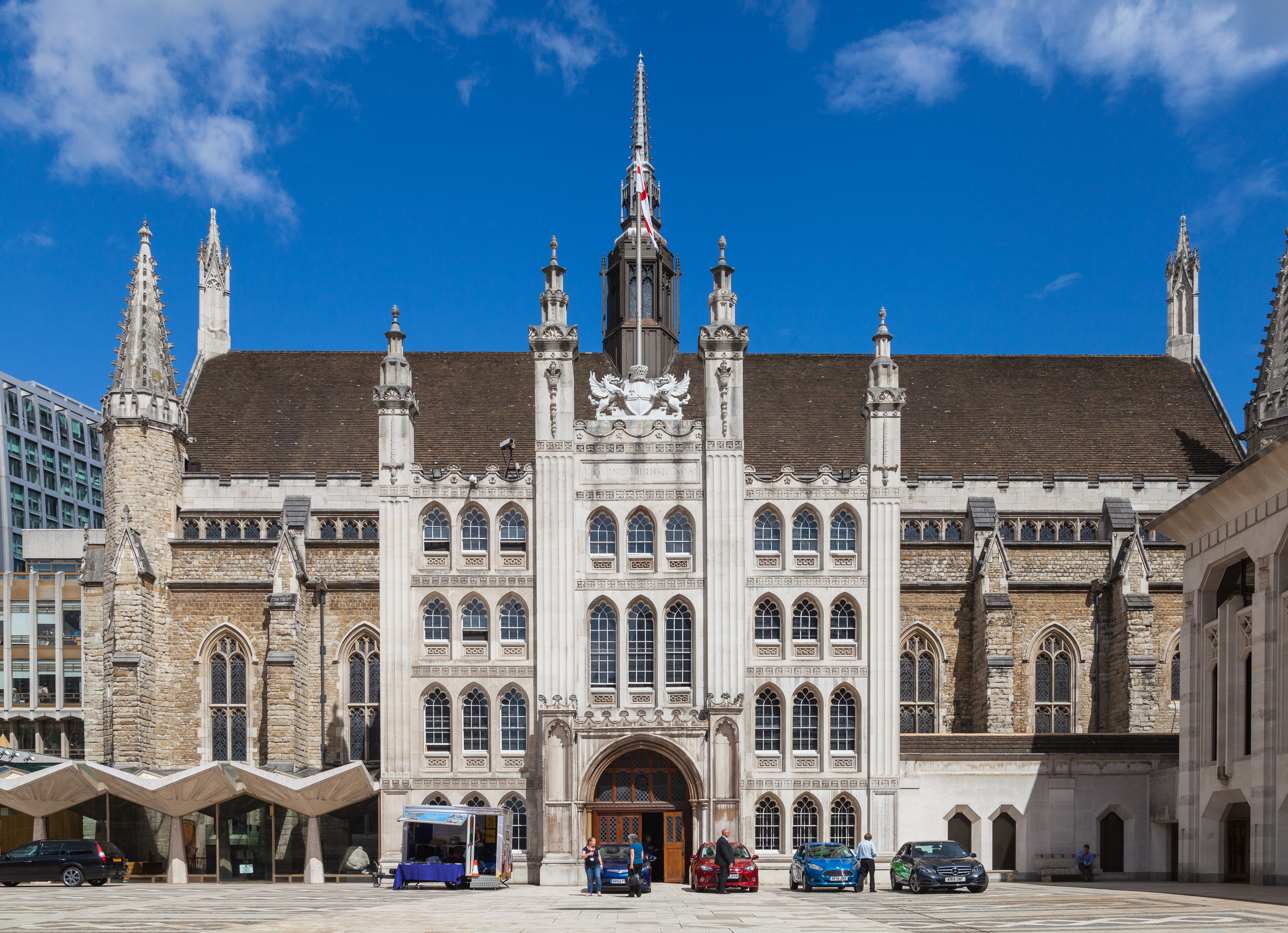
London's Guildhall, seen in 2014. Construction of the current building began in the early fifteenth century. Parts, such as the crypts, where interrogations were held, date from the 14th century.

Brembre served four terms as Mayor, three of them wholly under Richard II. His first began in 1377. In that year the King's uncle, John of Gaunt, proposed a Bill to the Bad Parliament to replace the elected Mayor with a captain appointed by the Crown, the combination of which caused severe rioting in the city. Mayor Adam Stable was deprived of office on 21 March by King Edward at Gaunt's instigation. In the city government's bid to reconcile with a Gaunt dominated government, it put Brembre forward as a candidate more acceptable to John of Gaunt. Brembre was sworn in the same day as Stable was deposed. (Note: Mayoral terms usually ran, notwithstanding exceptional cases such as Stable's, for 365 days from 28/29 October.)

He obtained a charter from the King in December, which guaranteed the city's liberties―including the right to alter their own charter―and restricted the right of aliens to trade. In April the following year Brembre, with other royal justices, oversaw the treason trial of Sir John Minsterworth within the Guildhall. Minsterworth, previously a loyal soldier fighting for Edward III in France, had recently been captured fighting for the French, although it is unknown whether he was present through choice or coercion. Minsterworth was found guilty of supporting a proposed French invasion of England and encouraging the Welsh rebel Owain Lawgoch. This was deemed "willful support of the King's enemies"; found guilty, Minsterworth was drawn, hanged and quartered at Tyburn. In March 1378, following a riot between the rival goldsmith and pepperer guilds, Brembre dismissed one of the sheriffs, goldsmith Nicholas Twyford, for attempting to prevent the arrest of a rioter. Several people had been wounded and took refuge in St Paul's Churchyard. Around the same time, a mob attacked the Earl of Buckingham's house and injured one of his servants. At the 1378 parliament held in Gloucester later that year, Buckingham threatened to impeach Brembre as Lord Mayor. Brembre bought the Earl off with a gift of 100 marks, but the charter he had recently gained for London was rescinded.

=== Peasants' Revolt and John Northampton ===
Brembre was succeeded by the fishmonger, and so fellow victualler, William Walworth in 1381. In May 1381 the Peasants' Revolt broke out in Essex and Kent, which saw a rebel army march on London the following month. Prescott argues that Brembre "displayed strength of character" during the crisis, probably raising both the militia and a personal retinue, certainly confronting the rebels at Smithfield, and being commissioned to hunt down rebels in the revolt's aftermath. With four colleagues, he was knighted by Richard II following the death of Wat Tyler at Smithfield in June 1381, making Brembre one of the few Londoners to be so elevated in the 14th century. (Note: With Brembre were the Mayor William Walworth and three other aldermen, John Philpot, Nicholas Twyford and Robert Launde. The only other Londoners knighted in the century were Richard de Refham around 1312 and Mayor John de Pulteney in 1337; after 1381, the next Londoner knighted was William Estfield nearly 60 years later, in 1439.) Brembre took as his seal, a letter B, crowned, with an escutcheon and crest

In 1381 Walworth was succeeded by Brembre's rival, John Northampton, the first of two terms he served as Mayor. Brembre, by now head of the Grocers' Company, argues Oliver, "worked tirelessly to further the economic advancement of his fellow grocers and merchant capitalists" by way of ensuring monopolies. This made him an opponent of Northampton, who was elected on a populist and radical agenda; Northampton was also backed by John of Gaunt. Northampton's policies included one-year terms for aldermen, an opening up to competition among he victualling trades and new election procedures. These set him on a collision course with the powerful Fishmongers' Company, whose head was Brembre's close political ally and business partner Nicholas Exton. For religious reasons, people fasted for around 90 days each year, and accordingly, London required a plentiful supply of cheap, fresh fish. Northampton's stance was popular, because the Fishmongers were seen as supplying low-quality produce. (Note: The city records condemned the Fishmongers' high prices for produce described as "putrid and corrupt, unwholesome as food for man, and an abomination".)

Although Brembre was not mayor or an MP at the time, the 1382 Parliament put Brembre on a commission of prominent merchants to advise on revenue raising after the Peasant's revolt. Brembre was elected as a Member of Parliament for London in the February 1383 election, although nothing is known of his contribution to the session.

=== Mayor 1383–1386 ===
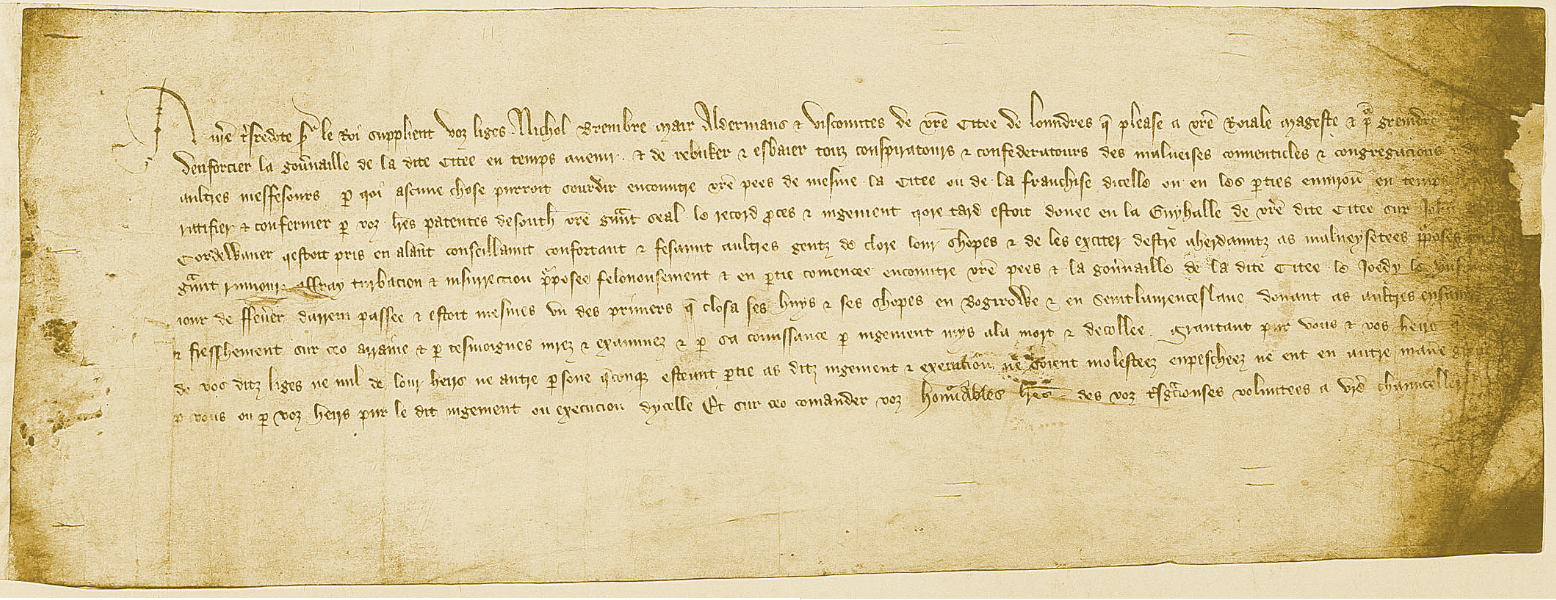
Petition of Brembre, April 1384, requesting the Royal council's ratification of the mayoral court's judgment on Constantine for inciting riots in the city; the petition also requests immunity from prosecution for those officials involved.

When Northampton stood for a third mayoral term in October 1383, Brembre stood against him; the election was tense—a contemporary records it as having been conducted "with a strong hond"—and Northampton likely used threats against opposition voters. However, Brembre won—according to the Westminster Chronicle—because he had the King's personal backing. His success may have come about due to fears over the security of the wool trade—late the previous year, France had invaded Flanders, bringing the trade to a halt—and was probably helped by his packing the Guildhall with armed supporters.

Northampton challenged the result and appealed to his patron, John of Gaunt, but this merely alienated the King. The opening weeks of Brembre's term were marked by severe public disorder in London, fomented by Northampton's supporters in protest at the election result. On 7 February 1384, Northampton himself led a crowd of around 500 people from West Cheap to Ludgate. Brembre was dining with Walworth, Philipot and other aldermen at Sir Richard Waldegrave's house when he heard the news. (Note: So around midday.) They caught up with Northampton at the Whitefriars, Fleet Street. When he ordered Northampton to return with him, the latter refused, and was promptly arrested for sedition, along with his brother, and then incarcerated in Brembre's house.

On 11 February there was a campaign of shop closures by Northampton's supporters organised by the cordwainer John Constantine, a close advisor and relative by marriage of Northampton's. "Excited as some will have it, by a spirit sent from the Devil, careered through the streets of London urging the populace to rise against the Mayor [Brembre], whom he declared to be bent on smashing all those who supported John of Northampton", as the Westminster Chronicle puts it. Brembre treated this as an insurrection and had Constantine summarily executed in Cheapside and his head set above Newgate. Three months later, a grocer was accused of speaking against Brembre―for "falsely and iniquitously" revenging himself upon Constantine—and in all over sixty people appeared before the mayoral court on such charges. Indeed, they provide the bulk of Brembre's court business.

By now recognised as an extreme factionalist, Northampton's reforms were annulled in quick succession by Brembre, who was directly responsible for Northampton's fall and disgrace in February 1384; he petitioned the King, accusing Northampton of treason. The scrivener and poet Thomas Usk―previously Northampton's private secretary―wrote a lengthy presentation to parliament detailing Northampton's conspiracy. According to Usk, it was only after Brembre had him arrested that he realised the falseness of his master's position; following Northampton's conviction, Usk was allowed to stay in Brembre's house and gradually received royal commissions. Tried in Reading in August—witnessed by Brembre and aldermen, who were in attendance—Northampton was sentenced to hang, although this was commuted. In the event he was exiled from the city, stripped of his citizenship and to be imprisoned no less than 100 leagues from London, (Note: So around 300 miles (480 km).) ending up in Tintagel Castle, Cornwall. He was never again to hold political office. Brembre passed several city ordinances against unlawful assembly, and several Northampton supporters were arrested for speaking "indecent" words against Brembre.

Early in Brembre's second term, Exton petitioned the Common Council against his condemnation in 1382. His appeal was, unsurprisingly, successful, and all records of Exton's previous conviction were struck through in the Council's Letter Book. In November 1383, following a substantial corporate loan to the Crown, Brembre obtained a new charter, which overturned the exclusion of victuallers from high office. However, in spite of his partisanship towards the Fishmongers' Company, he refused to reinstate their earlier monopoly which Northampton had ended perhaps as a measure to draw Northampton's supporters to him. Brembre also had official documents of Northampton's mayoralty destroyed. He caused discontent among the guilds by ordaining that their ordinances be presented at the Guildhall for verification. This caused sufficient resentment for him to be challenged for the office in October 1384 by Nicholas Twyford. The election proved controversial. Brembre had already safeguarded against opposition the previous year by passing an ordinance against "congregacions". Once again, Brembre resorted to strong arm tactics, concealing armed men around the Guildhall—a later petition claimed that "in the nyght ... he did carye grete quantitee of Armure to the Guyldehalle"―who rushed Twyford's supporters as his candidacy was announced; once again, he was elected rege favente, with the full support of the King. His opponents subsequently complained how

When free men of the Citee come to chese her Mair [Brembre's followers] breken up armed cryinge with loude voice "sle! sle!" folwyng hem; wherthourgh the peple for feere fledde to houses & other hidynges as in londe of werre.

Brembre blamed much of the disorder on innkeepers, whom he accused of allowing "larcenies and diverse evil deeds" to be plotted on their premises. While Mayor, Brembre continued to sit on Royal commissions such as that of de walliis et fossatis, (Note: Or walls and ditches. Such commissions were the principal method by which central government could impose drainage and other anti-flooding schemes over local objection. This was a particular concern in London, which was surrounded to the east and south by marshy, flood-prone land.) in the Stratford Langthorne area, approximately 5 miles (8.0 km) to the east in 1384. The populace vigorously protested against the Abbey's attempts to make them contribute to the costs; this had been an issue for the last three years.

At some point in 1385, Brembre oversaw judgment on one Elizabeth Brouderer—also called Moryng—who was accused of pretending to maintain young and vulnerable girls sub colore as apprentices in embroidery, while actually pimping them out to "friars, chaplains, and other men". She had been caught after one of her girls, a maid called Joan, who was instructed to "...go with the said chaplain to his chamber to carry a lantern for him ... with the intention that the said Joan would spend the night there" says the interrogation record. Joan went back the following night to rob the man in lieu of payment and stole a breviary. This Morying sold for eightpence. Brembre had her expelled from the city following her conviction. (Note: She appears to have moved to a house in Bishopsgate and was, therefore, outside the city walls, if only by a hundred yards or so.)

In October 1386, Brembre came to the end of his fourth term of office, and his close associate Exton was elected in his stead. Just before Exton was elected―by possibly a matter of a few days―Brembre had visited the King at Eynsham Abbey, where he may have encouraged Richard to expect and rely on London's support in the King's on-going struggle against the Lords Appellant. The Appellants later claimed that he was intending to raise an army 50,000-strong for the King in London.

== Last years and downfall ==
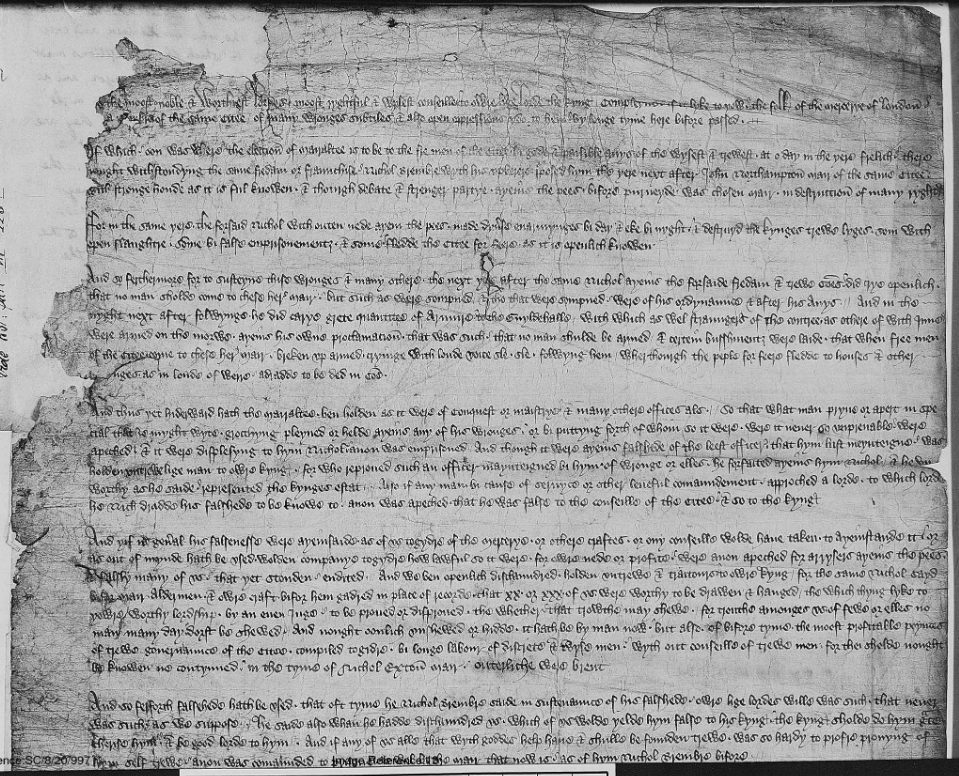
Scan of a 1388 petition from the Mercers' Company accusing Brembre of several offences, including "many wronges subtiles & also open oppressions", making "dyuerse enarmynges bi day & eke bi nyght", taking "grete quantitee of Armure to the Guyldehalle with which as wel straungers of the contree", and that any who "were displesyng to hym Nichol' anon was emprisoned". (Note: Transcribed and published by John Fisher in 1984.)

Following Exton's election, Brembre became more involved in national, rather than civic, politics, and became drawn into the King's dispute with several of his lords—who became known as the Lords Appellant (Note: So called because they invoked a legal procedure called an appeal to begin prosecution: the favourites, including Brembre, were charged under an "appeal of treason", a device borrowed from English civil law.)—as part of the king's council. This made him those lords' bitter enemy.

The lords in turn saw aligning with the Northampton party as a way to attack Brembre, who still had enemies in the city. Several guilds petitioned against Brembre in 1386, including the Mercers, whose petition is one of the few extant documents written in the vernacular in the 14th century. They accused him of openly declaring that 20 or 30 of them "were worthy to be drawen [sic] and hanged". The mercers, in turn, accused Brembre of being "a cause ... of dyvysion" in the city, who accused men of things that were not, in fact, illegal.

Other guilds which petitioned against Brembre were the Cordwainers, Founders, Saddlers, Painters, Armourers, Pinners, Embroiderers, Spinners, and the Blacksmiths, who complained that he used force to intimidate his opponents. (Note: The perceived continuity of the regime could be seen in the Cordwainers petition during Exton's mayoralty, which argued that Brembre's methods of "conquest" were still being used to maintain Exton in power. tenuz par conquest et maistrie from the Cordwainers Norman French petition to Parliament (Great Britain. Parliament 1767, pp. 226–227) in (Round 1886)) The same year, the Tailors' Company requested the return of their charter, which they said Brembre had illegally annulled. Medievalist Matthew Davies summarises that Brembre was accused of "exceeding his authority as Mayor, of creating a claustrophobic and fearful city where a word out of place could result in imprisonment or worse by a tyrannical regime. He was accused moreover of having accroached royal authority, through his exercise of summary justice in the city."

Brembre was still close to the King, and in August 1387 he attended a royal council in Nottingham that Richard had called to plan a strategy against the Appellants; returning to London, Brembre attempted to drum up support for the King among the citizenry and to swear oaths promising to rise against the Lords Appellant. It was traditional to attack not the King but his advisors who misled him, and this was the Appellants' approach against Brembre; Brembre probably attracted even more ire from the lords for involving himself in high politics , although only being, in social status, a merchant.

As far back as 1384, in recognition of his politically precarious position, he had tied up most of his assets in a complicated series of recognizances and conveyances. On 13 November 1387, in expectation of his impending arrest, he transferred his estates to feoffees, who included his brothers-in-law, John Vanner and Thomas Goodlake and Waldegrave. The next day, he was accused of treason by the Appellants.

Late in 1387 Richard went to the royal stronghold of the Tower of London to await forces to take on the Lords Appellant who had taken over his government. Brembre went with Richard to London, attempting to raise forces for Richard in the city but was unsuccessful due to the opposition of his successor and former ally Exton. The Ricardian faction, under de Vere, had been decisively defeated at the Battle of Radcot Bridge, and Brembre, holding the city against the victors, was their next target. He was charged among other things of having it "proclaimed in the city of London that no person should be so bold as to speak or utter an evil word or comment against the said malefactors and traitors, on pain of forfeiting whatsoever they could forfeit to our lord the King; thus accroaching to themselves royal power", while also turning Richard against his "loyal lords". On 1 January Brembre was arrested and imprisoned in Gloucester Castle.

== Trial ==
Also, the aforesaid Nicholas Brembre, while in office as Mayor of London for one day, snatched 22 people all of whom had been arrested and incarcerated in London's Newgate prison for various offences, some accused, some felons, and some chaplains. He took them, their arms bound, in the silence of night by force to a place called Foul Oak in Kent, and without the voice of a judge they were mercilessly allotted a capital sentence, and their blood ran in rivulets from their veins, except for one who escaped alive by means of some barely plausible excuse.

— Thomas Favent, Historia siue narratio de modo et forma mirabilis parliament

Brembre's trial, in the Merciless Parliament, began on 17 February 1388. He was the only one of the accused present. The Clerk of the Crown, Geoffrey Martin, took nearly two hours to announce the charges. Brembre's co-accused were Robert de Vere, Duke of Ireland; Michael de la Pole, Earl of Suffolk, Chancellor of England (1383–1386); Alexander Neville, Archbishop of York; and Robert Tresilian, Chief Justice of the King's Bench. Of these, de Vere, Neville de la Pole had fled the country and Tresilian was in hiding. Favent reported how "there was a mass of people filling the hall even to the corners"; but he also questioned, "where do you suppose was to be found the aforesaid false lords and their adherents? There was only Nicholas Brembre, who had previously been captured and roughly thrown into the prison of Gloucester".

The first day of the trial was spent on the charges against Brembre. He was called a "false knight" and accused of judicial murder, having allegedly had 22 prisoners from Newgate summarily executed at Foul Oak in Kent. (Note: Now part of Deptford; Chaucer was to be robbed by footpads there in 1390.) While there is some doubt as to the veracity of these charges, Bird has pointed out that Foul Oak was only around one mile from Brembre's manor of Lewisham, which is, she suggests, "to say the least, an interesting coincidence". The charge of treason stated all the accused―present or otherwise―were "traitors to the King and Kingdom, [who] have often taken large gifts in the King's name from various parties for the maintenance of causes, and sometimes from both parties", and that they had been "living in vice, deluding the said King ... embracing the mammon of iniquity for themselves". Other charges accused Brembre of malfeasance in office, extortion of the guilds, accroaching Royal authority and illegal distribution of livery. The chronicler Thomas Walsingham reports that Brembre was also popularly supposed to have wished to have changed the city's name to Troy or Little Troy, although this was never an official charge and was probably just a rumour intended to make Brembre look foolish. Other outlandish accusations included that Brembre desired to massacre thousands of citizens and make himself Duke of London.

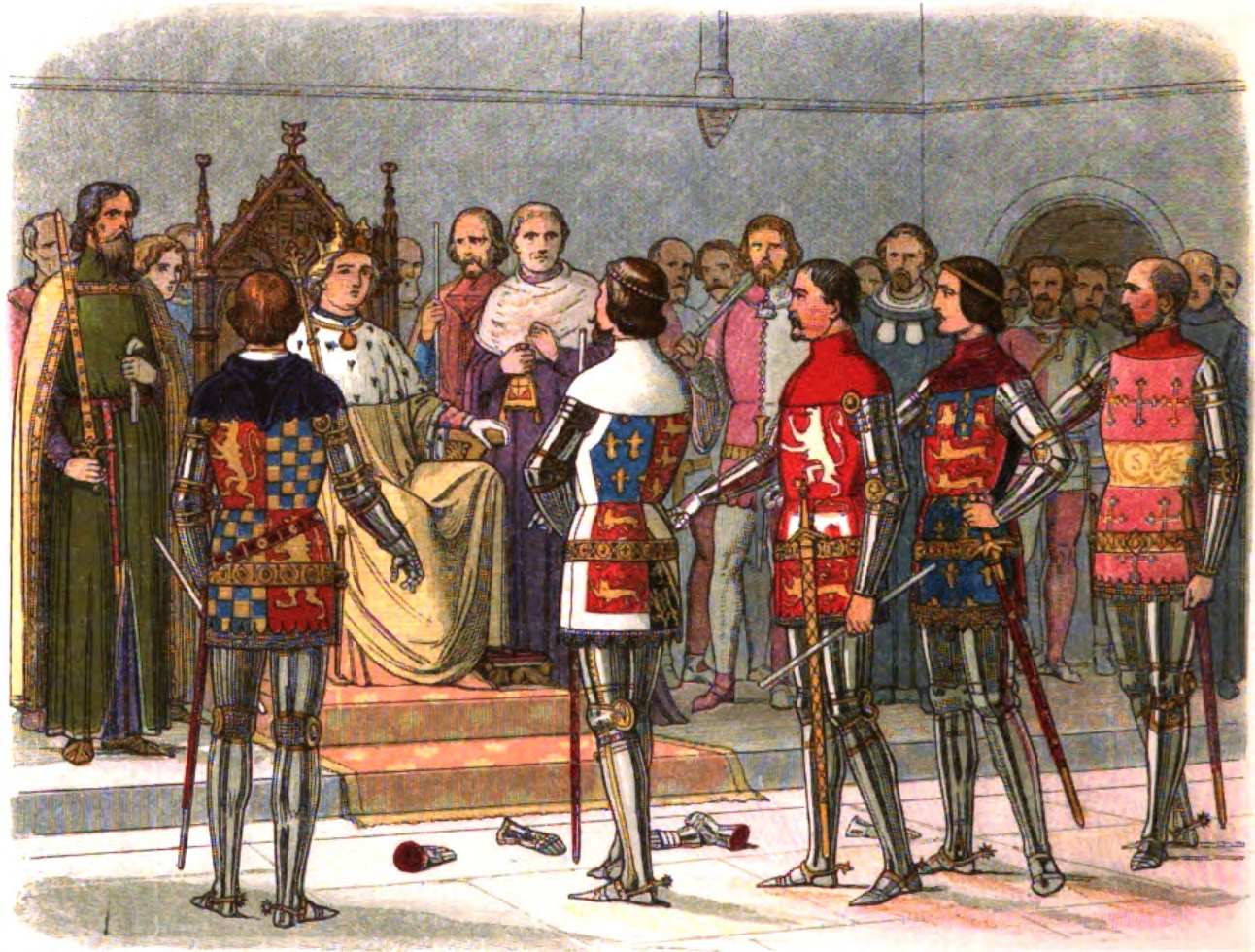
The Lords Appellant throw down their gauntlets before Richard II of England, to stop him speaking in defence of Brembre during the Merciless Parliament (1388)

On the second day of the trial, the King tried to speak for Brembre, as kings traditionally had a right to do in treason trials. Many lords present—according to the Westminster Chronicle, 305—threw down their gauntlets in protest. The King's support is in contrast to Brembre's family, of whom the medievalist Carole Rawcliffe notes, "however much they may have made out of him while he lived, [none] were able or willing to take a stand on his behalf". Brembre was denied a copy of the charges, but his trial was not the foregone conclusion that the Appellants may have expected, however. He protested his innocence vigorously, pleading "guilty of nothing" to each charge, taking legal counsel and even offering himself for trial by combat: "Whosoever inflicts on me such charges, I attest that I am ready to fight him in the lists to prove these things false". The Appellants originally agreed to this, stating "we pledge a duel for proving on your head that the things said are true", although this was soon withdrawn. They were forced to appoint a committee to examine the evidence against him. It included the Duke of York and the Earls of Kent, Salisbury, and Northumberland. The committee's deliberations, however, revealed the divisions among the peers. The committee―even though chosen exclusively by the Appellants―found Brembre innocent. There was no legal precedent for hearing an appeal of treason in parliament, and it did not require Royal assent to bring an appeal.

The third day of Brembre's trial, Wednesday 19th, witnessed a diversion when Tresilian was discovered in Westminster and dragged from sanctuary. He was brought into parliament, but having already been condemned in absentia, no trial was deemed necessary, and he was swiftly removed and, within a few hours, hanged at Tyburn. After the removal of Tresilian, and following the committee's failure to convict, the Appellants summoned two members of each London guild to testify against Brembre. This also failed to achieve its purpose (the Westminster Chronicle reports how "after spending some time in needless chatter these people at length returned home with nothing accomplished"). Eventually, the Appellants summoned Brembre's erstwhile colleague and business partner, Exton, and the city recorder, William Cheyne. Both had been leading members of Brembre's Ricardian faction. Exton, however, appears to have deserted Brembre by December 1387, when he rode out to greet the Appellants outside London. Adding insult to injury, eight aldermen who also testified against him were from Brembre's own Grocers' Guild. Questioned as to whether Brembre could be could have realised that his actions were treasonous, Exton allegedly replied that he "supposed he [Brembre] was aware rather than ignorant of them"—or, as May McKisack put it, was "more likely to be guilty than not". Either way, it was this judgment that persuaded the Appellant Lords to condemn Brembre. Brembre's fate had been sealed by his own erstwhile colleagues: "those that knew him best", says Oliver, however reluctantly they might have opined; said Favent, "Brembre then stood undone at last". Oliver argues that, as a result, Brembre was no longer being tried as a pro-Ricardian or on the Appellants' charges, but rather, by the citizenry of London for offences committed while Mayor. The King, meanwhile, was formally declared to be unsullied by the accusations against his supporters, merely that he had been led astray "through his tender age and innocence".

=== Execution ===
Favent reports how, following Brembre's condemnation, he was executed the next day, 20 February. Men of knightly status could generally look forward to the relatively quicker and more painless death by beheading, in turn saving their honour, but Brembre was sentenced to hang like a common criminal. On 20 February 1388 he was taken from the Tower of London, tied to a hurdle and dragged, via Cornhill, Cheapside, past the Guildhall and St Paul's, to Tyburn. The hurdle halted periodically for him to beg forgiveness from the crowds: "He asked for mercy from God and men, against whom he had committed great wrongs in time past, and many pitying him prayed". Such ambivalence suggests Brembre still had friends in the city, possibly as many as he had enemies. "Brembre died bravely", says Prescott. Even as the rope was placed around his neck, Brembre continued repenting, confessing to the ill-treatment of Northampton—whose son was in the Tyburn crowd (Note: Northampton was not, having been banished from London in 1384 and would not be permitted to return until 1390)—through his own arrogance, and begging forgiveness. Hanged until dead, his throat was afterwards cut: Favent commented, "behold how good and pleasant it is to be raised up to honours!"None were given formal trials. Neville was a bishop and was spared execution, but all his assets were seized, and he was exiled. The rest were ordered drawn and hanged, with Mowbray overseeing the executions with "the aid and authority of the Mayor, sheriffs, and aldermen of London". Mowbray was to take the condemned to the Tower and "'from there drag him through the city of London as far as the gallows at Tyburn, and there hang him by the neck".

Brembre's downfall and execution caused his colleagues substantial financial losses. John Fressh, for example, had not yet been paid by Brembre for his brokering of the latter's wool abroad at the time of Brembre's death, a sum amounting to £400 (equivalent to £400,000 in 2025).

== Aftermath ==
The Merciless Parliament continued the Appellants' purge of Ricardian loyalists. Royal retainers, clerks, chaplains, and secretaries to Richard were summarily condemned and executed. The bloodletting came to a head with the appeal of Sir Simon Burley, of involvement in the plot. He was a veteran of the Hundred Years' War, had been an adviser to the Black Prince, Richard's father, and a tutor to Richard himself. He had friends among the nobility and was a close friend of Edmund Langley, Duke of York. Such connections were insufficient to save him, however, and he and several other household knights were beheaded on Tower Hill. Thomas Usk, who had switched loyalty to Brembre from Northampton would also be accused of treason by the Appellants and hanged in March 1388.

One of the final acts of the Merciless Parliament was to lift all trading restrictions in London—as Northampton had agitated for and Brembre had vehemently opposed—for foreigners.

Brembre's dealings with the Crown, and his execution, made the city wary of further close relations with the King, and it ceased making government loans for the next four years. This, in turn, led to a crisis, called by historians Richard II's "quarrel with London". The city incurred the King's displeasure to such an extent that he suspended its liberties, including the ancient right to elect its own Mayor, and imposed a fine of £100,000 (equivalent to £94,400,000 in 2025). For a short period, the city was held directly by the King, who installed Sir Baldwin Raddington as its keeper. The King was attempting to gain the money through fines that he had requested several times in loans, yet had been refused.

The fall of Brembre led to the establishment of a new centrist alignment within city politics. Brembre's successor, Exton, had a similarly divisive mayoralty to Brembre—albeit without sharing his fate. However, subsequent Mayors such as Twyford and Adam Bamme steered a course between the rival parties. In 1390 a Bamme issued a proclamation "that no person shall speak or give his opinion as to either Nicholas Brembre or John Norhamptone" to silence the ongoing political dispute between the two mayors' supporters.

Brembre died wealthy. He left 150 sacks of wool and over £1000 (equivalent to £1,000,000 in 2025) in gold nobles on his death. However, the Appellants were determined to overturn Brembre's last enfeoffment, and although Vanner and Fitznichol were able to keep several manors in Kent from them, the struggle to recoup the bulk of Brembre's estates was still ongoing on the latter's death in 1391. They were not to be restored in bulk to his widow until 1396. Brembre was buried in the choir of the Christ Church Greyfriars. Brembre and Idiona had no children, and she later married the comptroller of the King's wardrobe and important Royal householdman, Baldwin Raddington. After Philipot's death in 1384, his sister-in-law Margaret had married Brembre's feoffee Fitznichol; when Fitznichol died seven years later, she married the then-Mayor―and former associate of John Northampton―Adam Bamme.

== Reputation ==
Brembre was a controversial figure to his contemporaries and remains so to modern historians. The chronicler Thomas Favent described Brembre as one of the King's rulers and closest advisers, but also a man

Of vicious character who deceived the King, having an eye to the business neither of the King nor Kingdom, but [he] grasped to [himself] the riches of iniquity by many evil deeds. The impoverished King was put into the shadow of [his] sin, and so the realm was smitten by the levying of a great plague of tenths and subsidies. (Note: McHardy describes Favent as politically sympathetic to the King's enemies and of "strong opinions ... loquacious and convoluted", but valuable in its detail.)

Rawcliffe has described Brembre as "one of the most powerful and controversial figures of the period [and] a man of spectacular wealth and ambition". Prescott suggests that while he was "Clearly a man of great ability [with] the pre-eminent virtue of loyalty", his treatment of Constantine and the Newgate prisoners―if true―demonstrate a capacity for brutality when deemed necessary, while Thrupp suggests he was "the most hated and unfortunate of the royal supporters", while to Anne Sutton he is "one of the over-mighty merchants in the tradition of Richard Lyons", a powerful royal financiar who had been impeached by the 1376 Good Parliament and then killed by Wat Tyler five years later. Such was the shadow that Brembre cast over city politics that even three years after his death, Mayor Adam Bamme prohibited any public mention of Brembre on pain of the culprit spending a year and a day in Newgate Prison.

== See also ==
- List of Sheriffs of the City of London
- List of Lord Mayors of London
- City of London (elections to the Parliament of England)

== Bibliography ==
- Astell, A. W. (1999). Political Allegory in Late Medieval England. en: Cornell University Press. ISBN 978-0-80147-465-1.
- Axworthy, R. L. (2004). "Lyons, Richard (d.1381)". Oxford Dictionary of National Biography (online ed.). Oxford University Press. doi:10.1093/ref:odnb/52191. ISBN 978-0-19-861412-8. (Subscription, Wikipedia Library access or UK public library membership required.)
- Barker, J. (2014). 1381: The Year of the Peasants' Revolt. New Haven: Harvard University Press. ISBN 978-0-67436-814-9.
- Barron, C. M (1971). "Richard II's Quarrel with London". In Du Boulay, F. R. H.; Barron, C. M. (eds.). The Reign of Richard II: Essays in Honour of May McKisack. London: University of London, Athlone Press. pp. 173–201. OCLC 265036853.
- Barron, C. M. (1974). The Medieval Guildhall of London. London: Corporation of London. ISBN 978-0-84260-828-2.
- Barron, C. M. (1981). Revolt in London: 11th to 15th June 1381. London: Museum of London. ISBN 978-0-90481-805-5.
- Barron, C. M. (1999). "Richard II and London". In Goodman, A.; Gillespie, J. L. (eds.). Richard II: The Art of Kingship. Oxford: Clarendon Press. pp. 129–154. ISBN 0-19-820189-3.
- Barron, C. M. (2000). "London 1300–1540". In Palliser, D. M.; Clark, P.; Daunton, M. J. (eds.). Cambridge Urban History of Britain 600-1540. Vol. I. Cambridge: Cambridge University Press. pp. 395–400. ISBN 978-1-10871-611-6.
- Barron, C. M. (2002). "Chivalry, Pageantry and Merchant Culture in Medieval London". In Coss, P. R. & Keen, M. (eds.). Heraldry, Pageantry and Social Display in Medieval England. Woodbridge: Boydell. pp. 219–242. ISBN 978-1-84383-036-8.
- Barron, C. M. (2003). "London and St Paul's Cathedral in the Later Middle Ages". In Backhouse, J. (ed.). The Medieval English Cathedral: Papers in Honour of Pamela Tudor-Craig. Proceedings of the 1998 Harlaxton Symposium. Donington: Shaun Tyas. pp. 126–149. ISBN 978-1-90028-955-9.
- Barron, C. M. (2005). London in the Later Middle Ages: Government and People 1200–1500. Oxford: Oxford University Press. ISBN 978-0-19928-441-2.
- Beaven, A. B. (1908). The Aldermen of the City of London. London: Eden Fisher. OCLC 4513239.
- Bennett, M. J. (1999). "Richard II and the Wider Realm". In Goodman, A.; Gillespie, J. L. (eds.). Richard II: The Art of Kingship. Oxford: Clarendon. pp. 187–204. ISBN 978-0-19820-189-2.
- Besant, W. (1906). Mediaeval London. Vol. II: Ecclesiastical. London: Adam & Charles Black. OCLC 221561795.
- Bolton, J. L. (1986). "The City and the Crown 1456–61". The London Journal: A Review of Metropolitan Society Past and Present. 12. OCLC 993072319.
- Bellamy, J. G. (1970). The Law of Treason in England in the Later Middle Ages. Cambridge: Cambridge University Press. ISBN 978-0-52107-830-6.
- Bird, R. (1949). The Turbulent London of Richard II. London: Longman. OCLC 644424997.
- Bloore, P.; Martin, E. A., eds. (2015). Wingfield College and Its Patrons: Piety and Patronage in Medieval Suffolk. Woodbridge: Boydell & Brewer. ISBN 978-1-84383-832-6.
- Brewer, D. (2000). The World of Chaucer (repr. ed.). Woodbridge: Boydell & Brewer. ISBN 978-0-85991-607-3.
- Carlson, D. (2004). Chaucer's Jobs. Basingstoke: Macmillan. ISBN 978-1-13703-914-9.
- Castor, H. (2024). The Eagle and the Hart: The Tragedy of Richard II and Henry IV. London: Simon and Schuster. ISBN 978-1-98213-922-3.
- Chapman, A. (2015). Welsh Soldiers in the Later Middle Ages, 1282–1422. Woodbridge: Boydell. ISBN 978-1-78327-031-6.
- City of London (England). Corporation (1868). Memorials of London and London Life, in the XIIIth, XIVth, and XVth Centuries: Being a Series of Extracts, Local, Social, and Political, from the Early Archives of the City of London, A.D. 1276–1419. London: Longmans, Green, and Co.
- Cohn, S. K. (2013). Popular Protest in Late Medieval English Towns. Cambridge: Cambridge University Press. ISBN 978-1-10702-780-0.
- Coleman, O. (1969). "The Collectors of Customs in London under Richard II". In Hollaender, A. E. J.; Kellaway, W. (eds.). Studies in London History Presented to Philip E. Jones. London: Hodder and Stoughton. pp. 181–194. ISBN 978-0-340-10836-9. OCLC 220501191.
- Davies, M. (2012). "Crown, City and Guild in Late Medieval London". In Davies, M.; Galloway, J. A. (eds.). London and Beyond: Essays in Honour of Derek Keene. London: University of London Press. pp. 247–268. ISBN 978-1-90516-570-4.
- Dinshaw, C. (1999). Getting Medieval: Sexualities and Communities, Pre- and Postmodern. London: Duke University Press. ISBN 978-0-82232-365-5.
- Dodd, G. (2011). "Was Thomas Favent a Political Pamphleteer? Faction and Politics in Later Fourteenth-century London". Journal of Medieval History. 37 (4): 397–418. doi:10.1016/j.jmedhist.2011.09.003. OCLC 39167361. S2CID 154945866.
- Dodd, G. (2011a). "The Spread of English in the Records of Central Government, 1400-1430". In Salter, E.; Wicker, H. (eds.). Vernacularity in England and Wales c. 1300–1550. Turnhout: Brepols. pp. 225–268. ISBN 978-2-50352-883-0.
- Ellis, R. (2012). Verba Vana: Empty Words in Ricardian London (PhD thesis). Vol. 1. Queen Mary, University of London.
- Favent, T. (2002). "History or Narration Concerning the Manner and Form of the Miraculous Parliament at Westminster". In Steiner, E.; Barrington, C. (eds.). The Letter of the Law: Legal Practice and Literary Production in Medieval England. Translated by Galloway, A. Ithaca: Cornell University Press. pp. 231–252. ISBN 978-0-80148-770-5.
- Ferster, J. (1996). Fictions of Advice: The Literature and Politics of Counsel in Late Medieval England. Philadelphia: University of Pennsylvania Press. ISBN 978-1-51280-552-9.
- Firth Green, R. (2002). A Crisis of Truth: Literature and Law in Ricardian England. The Middle Ages. Philadelphia: University of Pennsylvania Press. ISBN 978-0-81221-809-1.
- Fisher, J. H. (1984). An Anthology of Chancery English. Knoxville: University of Tennessee Press. ISBN 978-0-87049-433-8.
- French, K. L. (2021). Household Goods and Good Households in Late Medieval London: Consumption and Domesticity after the Plague. Philadelphia: University of Pennsylvania Press. ISBN 978-0-81229-953-3.*
- Galloway, J. A. (2012). "'Tempests of Weather and Great Abundance of Water': The Flooding of the Barking Marshes in the Later Middle Ages". In Davies, M.; Galloway, J. A. (eds.). London and Beyond: Essays in Honour of Derek Keene. London: University of London Press. pp. 67–84. ISBN 978-1-90516-570-4.
- Galloway, J. A.; Potts, J. S. (2007). "Marine Flooding in the Thames Estuary and Tidal River c. 1250–1450: Impact and Response". Area. 39 (3): 370–279. Bibcode:2007Area...39..370G. doi:10.1111/j.1475-4762.2007.00753.x.
- Given-Wilson, C.; Brand, P.; Phillips, S.; Ormrod, M.; Martin, G.; Curry, A.; Horrox, R., eds. (2005). "Introduction: Richard II: October 1386". British History Online. Parliament Rolls of Medieval England. Woodbridge.
- Given-Wilson, C.; Brand, P.; Phillips, S.; Ormrod, M.; Martin, G.; Curry, A.; Horrox, R., eds. (2005a). "Introduction: Richard II: February 1388". British History Online. Parliament Rolls of Medieval England. Woodbridge.
- Goldberg, J. (2014). "John Rykener, Richard II, and the Governance of London". Leeds Studies in English. 45: 49–70. OCLC 819172511.
- Goodman, A. (1971). The Loyal Conspiracy: The Lords Appellant Under Richard II. London: University of Miami Press. ISBN 0870242156.
- Goodman, A. J. (1992). John of Gaunt: The Exercise of Princely Power in Fourteenth-century Europe. Harlow: Longman. ISBN 978-0-58209-813-8.
- Hanawalt, B. (2017). Ceremony and Civility: Civic Culture in Late Medieval London. Oxford: Oxford University Press. ISBN 978-0-19049-043-0.
- Harriss, G. L. (2005). Shaping the Nation: England 1360–1461. Oxford: Clarendon Press. ISBN 978-0-19822-816-5.
- Hicks, M. A. (2002). The Wars of the Roses. Totton: Yale University Press. ISBN 978-0-30018157-9.
- Holmes, G. (1975). The Good Parliament. London: Clarendon Press. ISBN 978-0-19822-446-4.
- Kagay, D. J.; Villalon, L. J. A. (2021). Conflict in Fourteenth-Century Iberia: Aragon vs. Castile and the War of the Two Pedros. Leiden: Brill. ISBN 978-9-00442-505-7.
- Karras, R. M. (1998). Common Women: Prostitution and Sexuality in Medieval England. Oxford: Oxford University Press. ISBN 978-0-19535-230-6.
- Kleineke, H. (2001). "Carleton's book: William FitzStephen's "Description of London" in a Late Fourteenth-century Common-place Book". Historical Research. 74 (183): 117–126. doi:10.1111/1468-2281.00120.
- Lee, J. (2013). "From Defacement to Restoration: Inquisition, Confession and Thomas Usk's Appeal and Testament of Love". In Flannery, M. C.; Walter, K. L. (eds.). The Culture of Inquisition in Medieval England. Woodbridge: D. S. Brewer. pp. 94–111. ISBN 978-1-84384-336-8.
- LeLand, J. (2004). "Tresilian, Robert (d.1388)". Oxford Dictionary of National Biography (online ed.). Oxford University Press. doi:10.1093/ref:odnb/27715. ISBN 978-0-19-861412-8. (Subscription, Wikipedia Library access or UK public library membership required.)
- Lindenbaum, S. (1999), "London Texts and Literate Practice", in Wallace, D. (ed.), The Cambridge History of Medieval English Literature, Cambridge: Cambridge University Press, pp. 284–310, ISBN 978-0-52144-420-0
- Lloyd, T. H. (1977). The English Wool Trade in the Middle Ages. Cambridge: Cambridge University Press. ISBN 978-0-52121-239-7.
- Lobel, M. D. (1990). The British Atlas of Historic Towns: City of London from Prehistoric Times to c.1520. Vol. III. Oxford: Clarendon. ISBN 978-0-19822-979-7.
- McHardy, A. K. (2012). The Reign of Richard II: From Minority to Tyranny 1377–97. Manchester: Manchester University Press. ISBN 978-0-71903-852-5.
- McKelvie, G. (2020). Bastard Feudalism, English Society and the Law: The Statutes of Livery, 1390–1520. Woodbridge: Boydell Press. ISBN 978-1-78327-477-2.
- McKisack, M. (1962). The Parliamentary Representation of the English Boroughs during the Middle Ages (repr. ed.). London: F. Cass. OCLC 290021.
- McSheffrey, S. (2018). "Liberties of London: Social Networks, Sexual Disorder, and Independent Jurisdiction in the Late Medieval English Metropolis". In Butler, S. M.; Kesselring, K. J. (eds.). Crossing Borders: Boundaries and Margins in Medieval and Early Modern Britain: Essays in Honour of Cynthia J. Neville. Later Medieval Europe. Vol. 17. Leiden: Brill. pp. 216–236. ISBN 978-9-00436-495-0.
- McKisack, M. (1991). The Fourteenth Century (repr. ed.). Oxford: Oxford University Press. ISBN 978-0-19285-250-2.
- McVitty, E. A. (2014). "False Knights and True Men: Contesting Chivalric Masculinity in English Treason Trials, 1388–1415". Journal of Medieval History. 40 (4): 458–477. doi:10.1080/03044181.2014.954139.
- McVitty, E. A. (2020). Treason and Masculinity in Medieval England: Gender, Law and Political Culture. Woodbridge: Boydell & Brewer. ISBN 978-1-78327-555-7.
- Myers, A. R. (1988). London in the Age of Chaucer. Norman: University of Oklahoma Press. ISBN 978-0-80612-111-6.
- Nightingale, P. (1995). A Medieval Mercantile Community: The Grocers' Company and the Politics and Trade of London, 1000—1485. New Haven: Yale University Press. ISBN 978-0-30006-325-7.
- Nightingale, P. (1989). "Capitalists, Crafts and Constitutional Change in Late Fourteenth-Century London". Past & Present (124): 3–35. doi:10.1093/past/124.1.3. JSTOR 650891.
- Nightingale, P. (2000). "Knights and Merchants: Trade, Politics and the Gentry in Late Medieval England". Past & Present (169): 36–62. doi:10.1093/past/169.1.36.
- Nightingale, P. (2004). "Philipot, Sir John (d. 1384)". Oxford Dictionary of National Biography (online ed.). Oxford University Press. doi:10.1093/ref:odnb/22107. ISBN 978-0-19-861412-8. (Subscription, Wikipedia Library access or UK public library membership required.)
- Oliver, C. (2010). Parliament and Political Pamphleteering in Fourteenth-century England. Woodbridge: Boydell & Brewer. ISBN 978-1-90315-331-4.
- Orme, N. (1984). Medieval Children. London: Yale University Press. ISBN 978-0-30009-754-2.
- Postan, M. M. (1972). The Medieval Economy and Society (repr. ed.). London: Penguin. OCLC 7113198358.
- Prescott, A. (1981). "London and the Peasants' Revolt: A Portrait Gallery". The London Journal: A Review of Metropolitan Society Past and Present. 7. OCLC 993072319.
- Prescott, A. (2004). "Brembre, Nicholas (d. 1388)". Oxford Dictionary of National Biography.
- Prestwich, M. (1996). Armies and Warfare in the Middle Ages: The English Experience. New Haven: Yale University Press. ISBN 978-0-30007-663-9.
- Putter, A. (2001). "In Search Of Lost Time: Missing Days in Sir Cleges and Sir Gawain and the Green Knight". In Humphrey, C.; Ormrod, W. M. (eds.). Time in the Medieval World. Woodbridge: Boydell Press. pp. 119–136. ISBN 978-1-90315-308-6.
- Rawcliffe, C. R. (1993). "Frosh, John (d.1397), of London". The History of Parliament Online. Woodbridge: Boydell and Brewer.
- Rawcliffe, C. (1994). "Margaret Stodeye, Lady Philipot (d. 1431)". In Barron, C. M.; Sutton, A. F. (eds.). Medieval London Widows 1300–1500. Cambridge: Cambridge University Press. pp. 85–98. ISBN 978-1-85285-085-2.
- Rawcliffe, C. (2013). Urban Bodies: Communal Health in Late Medieval English Towns and Cities. Woodbridge: Boydell and Brewer. ISBN 978-1-84383-836-4.
- Reames, S. (2001). "Litugical Offices for the Cult of St Thomas Becket". In Head, Thomas F. (ed.). Medieval Hagiography: An Anthology. London: Routledge. pp. 561–594. ISBN 978-0-41593-753-5.
- Robertson, D. W. (1968). Chaucer's London. New Dimensions in History. London: John Wiley. OCLC 955943939.
- Rodger, N. A. M. (2004). The Safeguard of the Sea: A Naval History of Britain. 660–1649. Vol. I. London: Penguin. ISBN 978-0-14029-724-9.
- Rose, J. (2017). Maintenance in Medieval England. Cambridge: Cambridge University Press. ISBN 978-1-10821-023-2.
- Roskell, J. S. (1983). Parliament and Politics in Late Medieval England. Vol. III. London: Bloomsbury. ISBN 978-0-90762-830-9.
- Roskell, J. S. (1984). The Impeachment of Michael de la Pole, Earl of Suffolk in 1386: In the Context of the Reign of Richard II. Manchester: Manchester University Press. ISBN 978-0-71900-963-1.
- Rotuli Parliamentorum; ut et petitiones, et placita in Parliamento (in Anglo-Norman and Latin). Vol. 3. London: Record Commission / Great Britain Parliament. 1767. OCLC 695983551.
- Round, John Horace (1886). "Brembre, Nicholas" . In Stephen, Leslie (ed.). Dictionary of National Biography. Vol. 6. London: Smith, Elder & Co.
- Sanderlin, S. (1988). "Chaucer and Ricardian Politics". The Chaucer Review. 22: 171–184. OCLC 43359050.
- Saul, Nigel (1997). Richard II. New Haven: Yale University Press. ISBN 978-0-300-07003-3.
- Scase, W. (2007). Literature and Complaint in England 1272–1553. Oxford: Oxford University Press. ISBN 978-0-19153-378-5.
- Steel, A. (1974). "The Collectors of the Customs in the Reign of Richard II". In Hearder, H.; Loyn, H. R. (eds.). British Government and Administration: Studies Presented to S. B. Chrimes. Cardiff: University of Wales Press. pp. 27–39. ISBN 0708305385.
- Strohm, P. (2004). "Northampton [Comberton], John (d. 1398)". Oxford Dictionary of National Biography (online ed.). Oxford University Press. doi:10.1093/ref:odnb/20322. ISBN 978-0-19-861412-8. (Subscription, Wikipedia Library access or UK public library membership required.)
- Strohm, P. (2006). Hochon's Arrow: The Social Imagination of Fourteenth-Century Texts. Princeton: Princeton University Press. ISBN 978-0-69101-501-9.
- Strohm, P. (2015). The Poet's Tale: Chaucer and the year that made The Canterbury Tales. London: Profile Books. ISBN 978-1-84765-899-9.
- Sumption, Jonathan (2009). Divided Houses: Hundred Years War. Vol. 3. London: Faber & Faber. ISBN 978-0-57124-012-8.
- Sutton, A. F. (2005). The Mercery of London: Trade, Goods and People, 1130–1578. London: Routledge. ISBN 978-0-75465-331-8.
- Thomson, J. A. F. (2014). The Transformation of Medieval England 1370-1529. London: Routledge. ISBN 978-1-31787-260-3.
- Thrupp, S. L. (1989). The Merchant Class of Medieval London, 1300–1500 (repr. ed.). Ann Arbor: University of Michigan Press. ISBN 978-0-47206-072-6.
- TNA. "SC 8/183/9147" (1384) [manuscript]. Special Collections: Ancient Petitions, Series: SC 8, p. Petitioners: Nicholas Brembre, mayor of London; Aldermen and sheriffs of London. Kew: The National Archives.
- TNA. "SC 8/20/997" (1388) [manuscript]. Special Collections: Ancient Petitions, Series: SC 8, p. Petitioners: ercers of London. Addressees: Council. Kew: The National Archives.
- Tuck, A. (1999). Crown and Nobility: England 1272–1461 (2nd ed.). Oxford: Blackwell. ISBN 978-0-63121-466-3.
- Tuck, A. (2004). "Richard II (1367–1400)". Oxford Dictionary of National Biography (online ed.). Oxford University Press. doi:10.1093/ref:odnb/23499. ISBN 978-0-19861-412-8. (Subscription, Wikipedia Library access or UK public library membership required.)
- Tuck, A. (2004a). "Lords appellant (act. 1387–1388)". Oxford Dictionary of National Biography (online ed.). Oxford University Press. doi:10.1093/ref:odnb/53093. ISBN 978-0-19861-412-8. (Subscription, Wikipedia Library access or UK public library membership required.)
- Turner, M. M. (2007). Chaucerian Conflict: Languages of Antagonism in Late Fourteenth-Century London. Oxford: Oxford University Press. ISBN 978-0-19920-789-3.
- Villalon, A.; Kagay, D. (2017). To Win and Lose a Medieval Battle: Nájera (April 3, 1367), A Pyrrhic Victory for the Black Prince. Leiden: Brill. ISBN 978-9-00434-580-5.
- Wallace, D. (1997). Chaucerian Polity: Absolutist Lineages and Associational Forms in England and Italy. Stanford: Stanford University Press. ISBN 978-0-80472-724-2.
- Walsingham, T. (2005) [1863–1864]. Clark, J. G. (ed.). The Chronica Maiora of Thomas Walsingham, 1376–1422. Translated by Preest, D. Woodbridge: Boydell Press. ISBN 978-1-84383-144-0.
- Workman, H. B. (1926). John Wyclif: A Study of the English Medieval Church. Vol. I. Oxford: Clarendon. OCLC 769417789.
