= Lords Appellant =

Rebel lords under King Richard II

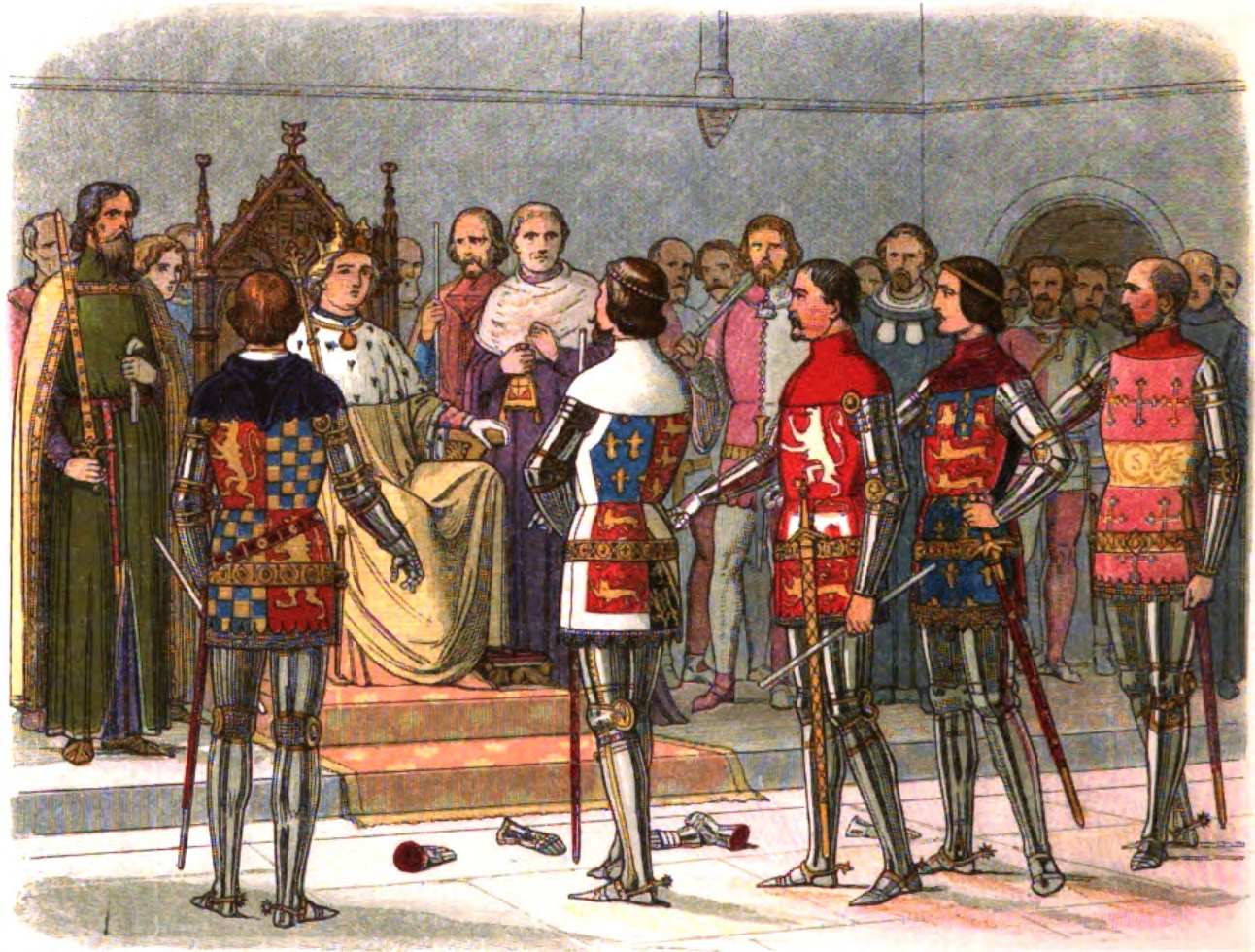
A Victorian depiction of the Lords Appellant throwing down their gauntlets to King Richard II to stop him speaking in defence of Nicholas Brembre. From left to right: Arundel; Gloucester; Mowbray; Bolingbroke (later Henry IV); and Warwick.

The Lords Appellant were a group of nobles in the reign of King Richard II, who, in 1388, sought to impeach five of the King's favourites in order to restrain what was seen as tyrannical and capricious rule. The word appellant — still used in a legal context in modern English — simply means '[one who is] appealing'. It is the older (Norman) French form of the present participle of the verb appeler, the equivalent of the English 'to appeal'. The group was called the "Lords Appellant" because its members invoked a legal procedure called an "appeal" to begin prosecution: the favourites were charged under an "appeal of treason", a device borrowed from English civil law, which led to some procedural complications.

== Members ==
There were originally three Lords Appellant:

- Thomas of Woodstock, Duke of Gloucester, youngest son of Edward III and thus the king's uncle;
- Richard FitzAlan, Earl of Arundel and of Surrey; and
- Thomas de Beauchamp, Earl of Warwick.

These were later joined by:

- Henry Bolingbroke, Earl of Derby (the future king Henry IV) and
- Thomas de Mowbray, Earl of Nottingham (later Duke of Norfolk).

== Success ==
Upon the successful conviction of the King's favourites at trial, the Lords Appellant formed themselves into an extralegal "Commission" starting on 19 November 1386 to check Richard II's power. The following year, 1387, an attempt by Robert de Vere, Earl of Oxford to overthrow the Commission and reestablish Richard as sole ruler ended in a royal defeat at the skirmish of Radcot Bridge, outside Oxford. Richard was thus reduced to a figurehead; he had no real power and was forced to acknowledge the supremacy of the Commission. Towards the end of the Lords Appellant's term Richard attempted to raise forces against them, with the Lord Mayor of London Sir Nicholas Brembre unsuccessfully attempting to raise forces in London.

The Lords Appellant proceeded to punish the King's disgraced favourites by calling the "Merciless Parliament" of 1388 to pass judgement. The nominal governor of Ireland, de Vere, and Richard's Lord Chancellor, Michael de la Pole, Earl of Suffolk, who had fled abroad, were sentenced to death in absentia. Alexander Neville, Archbishop of York, had his estate confiscated. The Lord Chief Justice, Sir Robert Tresilian, was executed, as were the mayor Brembre, courtiers John Beauchamp of Holt, Sir James Berners, and Sir John Salisbury. Sir Simon Burley was found guilty of exercising undue influence over the king and was sentenced to death. Derby and Nottingham, together with the Duke of York, tried to win a reprieve for him, but he was executed on 5 May.

== Aftermath ==
The Cambridge Parliament followed in the same year due to a lack of government funds, and more dissatisfaction was heard from the Commons. In 1389, Richard's uncle, John of Gaunt, returned from campaigning in Spain. His influence enabled Richard to slowly rebuild his power until 1397, when he reasserted his authority and destroyed the principal three among the Lords Appellant, Gloucester, Arundel and Warwick.

Richard never forgave the Lords Appellant. His uncle Gloucester was murdered in captivity in Calais; he was killed on Richard's orders. The Earl of Arundel was beheaded. Warwick lost his title and his lands and was imprisoned on the Isle of Man until Richard was overthrown by Henry Bolingbroke.

Henry Bolingbroke, John of Gaunt's son, was set to duel Thomas Mowbray (Duke of Norfolk) in Coventry in 1398 over treason charges (including plotting the death of Gloucester), but King Richard II dramatically stopped the trial by combat just before it began, exiling Bolingbroke for ten years (reduced to six) and Mowbray for life, a pivotal event leading to Bolingbroke's eventual return and seizure of the throne. The behaviour of the two junior Lords Appellant probably influenced Richard's decision in 1398 not only to exile them both but to also revoke the permission he had given them to sue for any inheritance which fell due, as it did in relation to Mowbray's grandmother and, more significantly, of John of Gaunt.

However, in 1399 Richard was deposed by Bolingbroke, partly as a result of the royal confiscation of Gaunt's estate on his death. Bolingbroke succeeded him as Henry IV.

== Sources ==
- Burt, Caroline; Partington, Richard (2024). Arise England: Six kings and the making of the English state. London: Faber. ISBN 978-0-571-31198-9.
- Castor, Helen (2024). The Eagle and the Hart.
- Goodman, Anthony (1971). The Loyal Conspiracy: The Lords Appellant under Richard II. University of Miami Press.
- Roskell, J. S.; Clark, Linda; Rawcliffe, Carole (1993). "Stafford, Sir Humphrey I (d. 1413)". In Roskell, J. S.; Clark, Linda; Rawcliffe, Carole (eds.). The History of Parliament: the House of Commons 1386–1421. London: History of Parliament Trust.
- Tuck, Anthony (2004). "Lords appellant (act. 1387–1388)". Oxford Dictionary of National Biography (online ed.). Oxford University Press. (Subscription, Wikipedia Library access or UK public library membership required.)
