= Richard II of England =

King of England from 1377 to 1399

Richard II
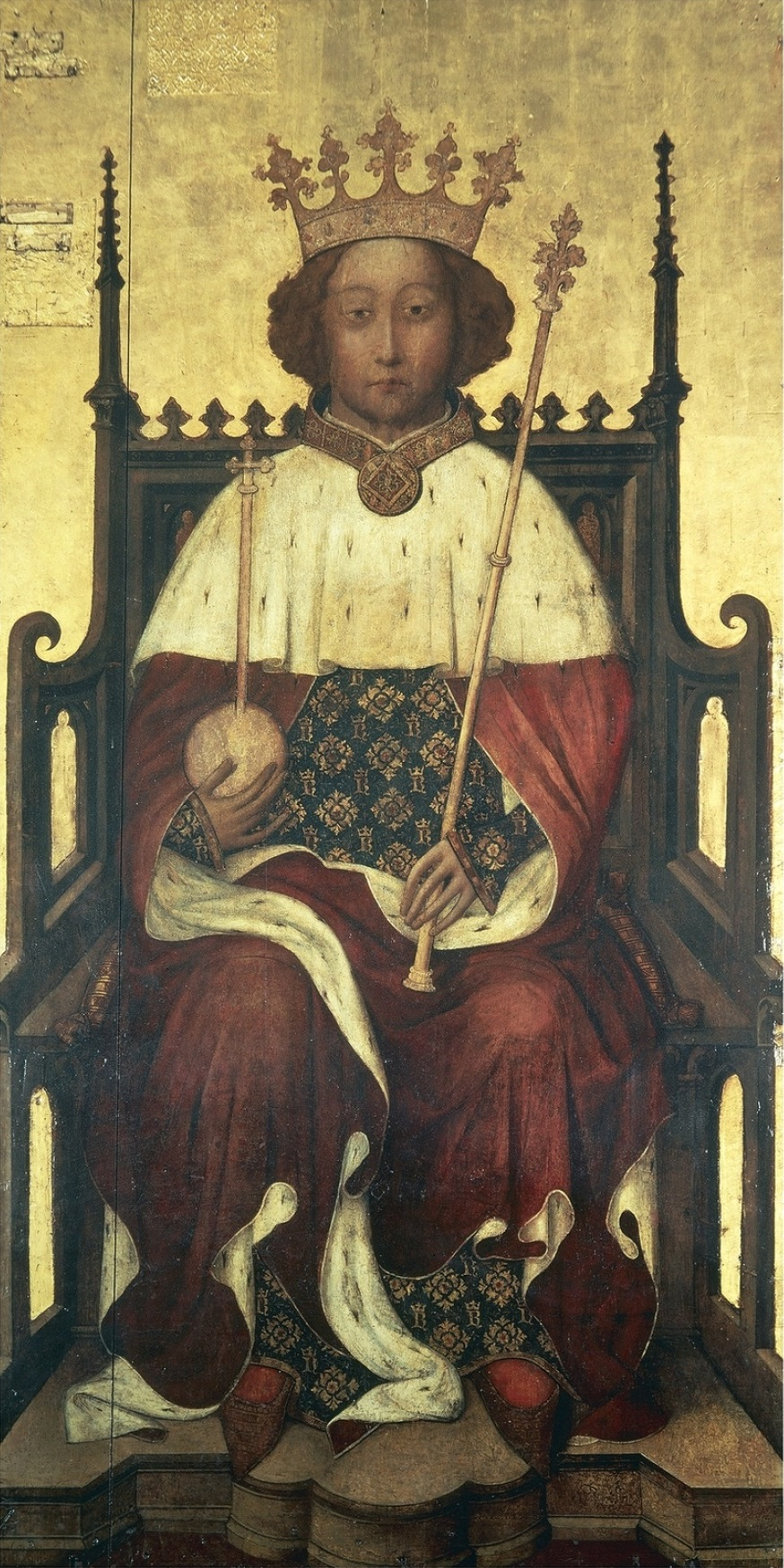
- Portrait at Westminster Abbey, mid-1390s (Note: This is the earliest known portrait of an English monarch.)

King of England
- Reign: 21 June 1377 – 29 September 1399
- Coronation: 16 July 1377
- Predecessor: Edward III
- Successor: Henry IV
- Born: 6 January 1367; Bordeaux, France
- Died: c. 14 February 1400 (aged 33); Pontefract Castle, Yorkshire, England
- Burial: Dominican Friary, Kings Langley, Hertfordshire (1400–1413); Westminster Abbey, London (since 1413)
- Spouses: Anne of Bohemia (m. 1382; died 1394); Isabella of Valois (m. 1396)
- House: Plantagenet
- Father: Edward the Black Prince
- Mother: Joan of Kent

Richard II (6 January 1367 – c. 14 February 1400), also known as Richard of Bordeaux, was King of England from 1377 until he was deposed in 1399. He was the son of Edward the Black Prince and Joan of Kent. The Black Prince died in 1376, leaving Richard as heir apparent to his grandfather, King Edward III. Upon the King's death, the 10-year-old Richard succeeded to the throne.

During Richard's first years as king, government was in the hands of a series of regency councils influenced by Richard's uncles, John of Gaunt and Thomas of Woodstock. England faced various problems, most notably the Hundred Years' War. A major challenge of the reign was the Peasants' Revolt in 1381, and the young king played a central part in the brutal suppression of this crisis. Less warlike than either his father or grandfather, he sought to bring an end to the Hundred Years' War. A firm believer in the royal prerogative, Richard restrained the power of the aristocracy and relied on a private retinue for military protection instead. In contrast to his grandfather, Richard cultivated a refined atmosphere centred on art and culture at court, in which the king was an elevated figure.

His dependence on a small number of courtiers caused discontent among the nobility, and in 1387 control of government was taken over by a group of aristocrats known as the Lords Appellant. By 1389 Richard had regained control, and for the next eight years governed in relative harmony with his former opponents. In 1397, he took his revenge on the Appellants, many of whom were executed or exiled. The next two years have been described by historians as Richard's "tyranny". In 1399, after John of Gaunt died, the King disinherited Gaunt's son Henry Bolingbroke, who had previously been exiled. Henry invaded England in June 1399 with a small force that quickly grew in numbers. Meeting little resistance, he deposed Richard and had himself crowned king as Henry IV. Richard is thought to have been starved to death in captivity, although questions remain regarding his final fate.

Richard's posthumous reputation has been shaped to a large extent by William Shakespeare, whose play Richard II portrayed Richard's misrule and his deposition as responsible for the 15th-century Wars of the Roses. Modern historians do not accept this interpretation, while not exonerating Richard from responsibility for his own deposition. Although probably not insane, as many historians of the 19th and 20th centuries believed him to be, he may have had a personality disorder, particularly manifesting itself towards the end of his reign. Most authorities agree that his policies were not unrealistic or even entirely unprecedented, but that the way in which he carried them out was unacceptable to the political establishment, leading to his downfall.

== Early life ==
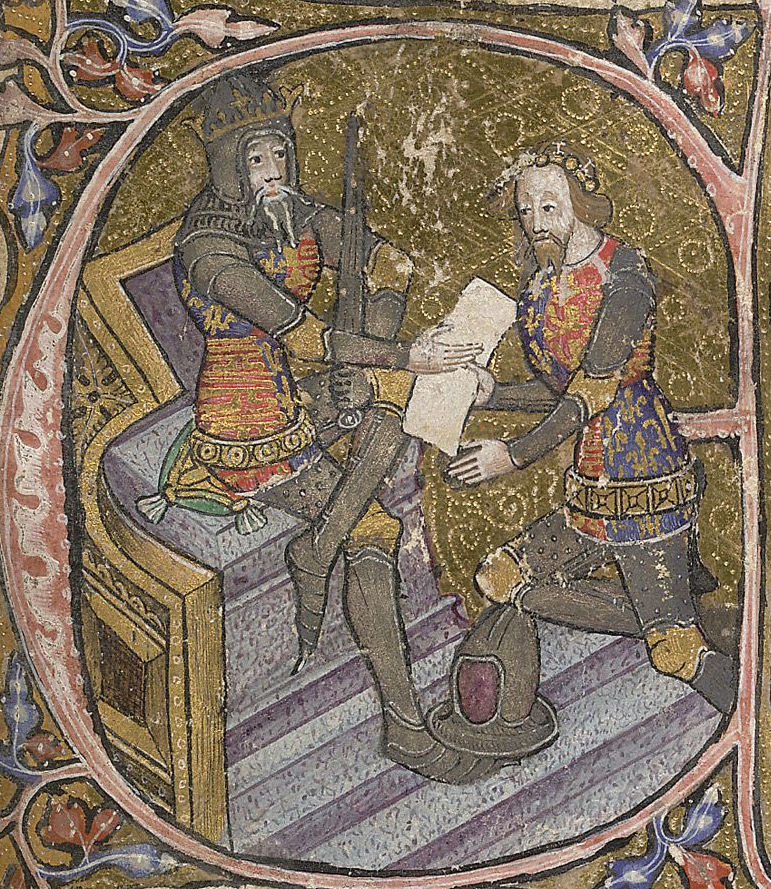
Edward, Prince of Wales, kneeling before his father, King Edward III

Richard of Bordeaux was the younger son of Edward, Prince of Wales, and Joan, Countess of Kent. Edward, known as the Black Prince, eldest son of Edward III and heir apparent to the throne of England, had distinguished himself as a military commander in the early phases of the Hundred Years' War, particularly in the Battle of Poitiers in 1356. After further military adventures, however, he contracted dysentery in Spain in 1370. He never fully recovered and had to return to England the next year.

Richard was born at the Archbishop's Palace of Bordeaux, in the duchy of Aquitaine, on 6 January 1367, reportedly prematurely due to Joan's stress caused by the Black Prince's departure on Spanish campaign. According to contemporary sources, three kings, "the King of Castile, the King of Navarre and the King of Portugal", were present at his birth. This anecdote, and the fact that his birth fell on the feast of Epiphany, was later used in the religious imagery of the Wilton Diptych, where Richard is one of three kings paying homage to the Virgin and Child.

Richard's elder brother, Edward of Angoulême, died near his sixth birthday in 1370.

The Prince of Wales finally succumbed to his long illness in June 1376. The Commons in the Good Parliament genuinely feared that Richard's uncle, John of Gaunt, would usurp the throne. For this reason, Richard was quickly invested with the princedom of Wales and his father's other titles and publicly recognised as heir.

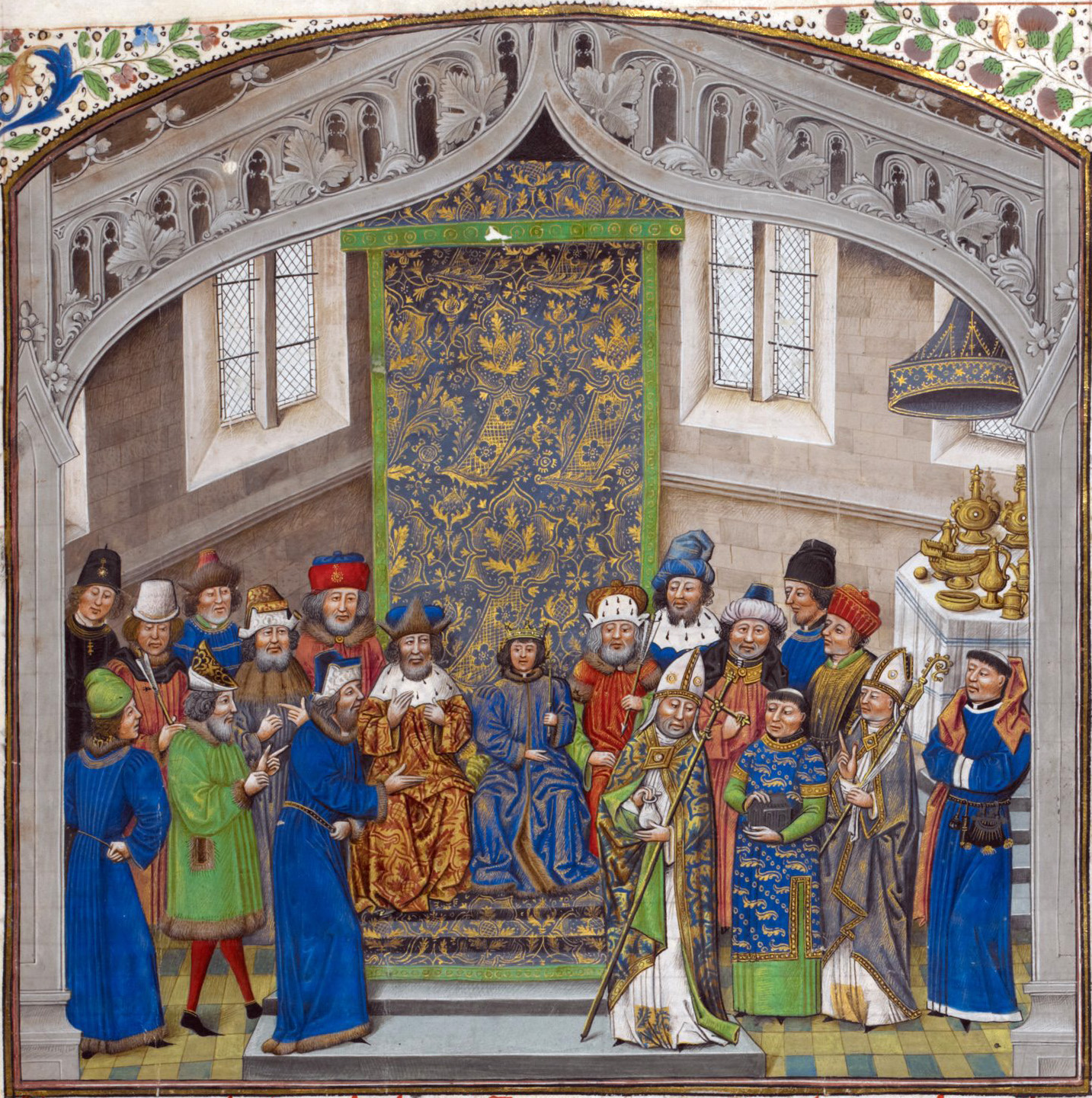
Coronation of Richard II aged ten in 1377, from the Recueil des croniques of Jean de Wavrin. British Library, London.

On 21 June 1377, King Edward III, who was for some years frail and decrepit, died after a 50-year reign. This resulted in the 10-year-old Richard succeeding to the throne. He was crowned on 16 July at Westminster Abbey. Again, fears of John of Gaunt's ambitions influenced political decisions, and a regency led by the King's uncles was avoided. Instead, the King was nominally to exercise kingship with the help of a series of "continual councils", from which Gaunt was excluded.

Gaunt, together with his younger brother Thomas of Woodstock, Earl of Buckingham, still held great informal influence over the business of government, but the King's councillors and friends, particularly Sir Simon de Burley and Robert de Vere, 9th Earl of Oxford, increasingly gained control of royal affairs.

In a matter of three years, these councillors earned the mistrust of the Commons to the point that the councils were discontinued in 1380. Contributing to discontent was an increasingly heavy burden of taxation levied through three poll taxes between 1377 and 1381 that were spent on unsuccessful military expeditions on the continent. By 1381, there was a deep-felt resentment against the governing classes in the lower levels of English society.

== Early reign ==
=== Peasants' Revolt ===
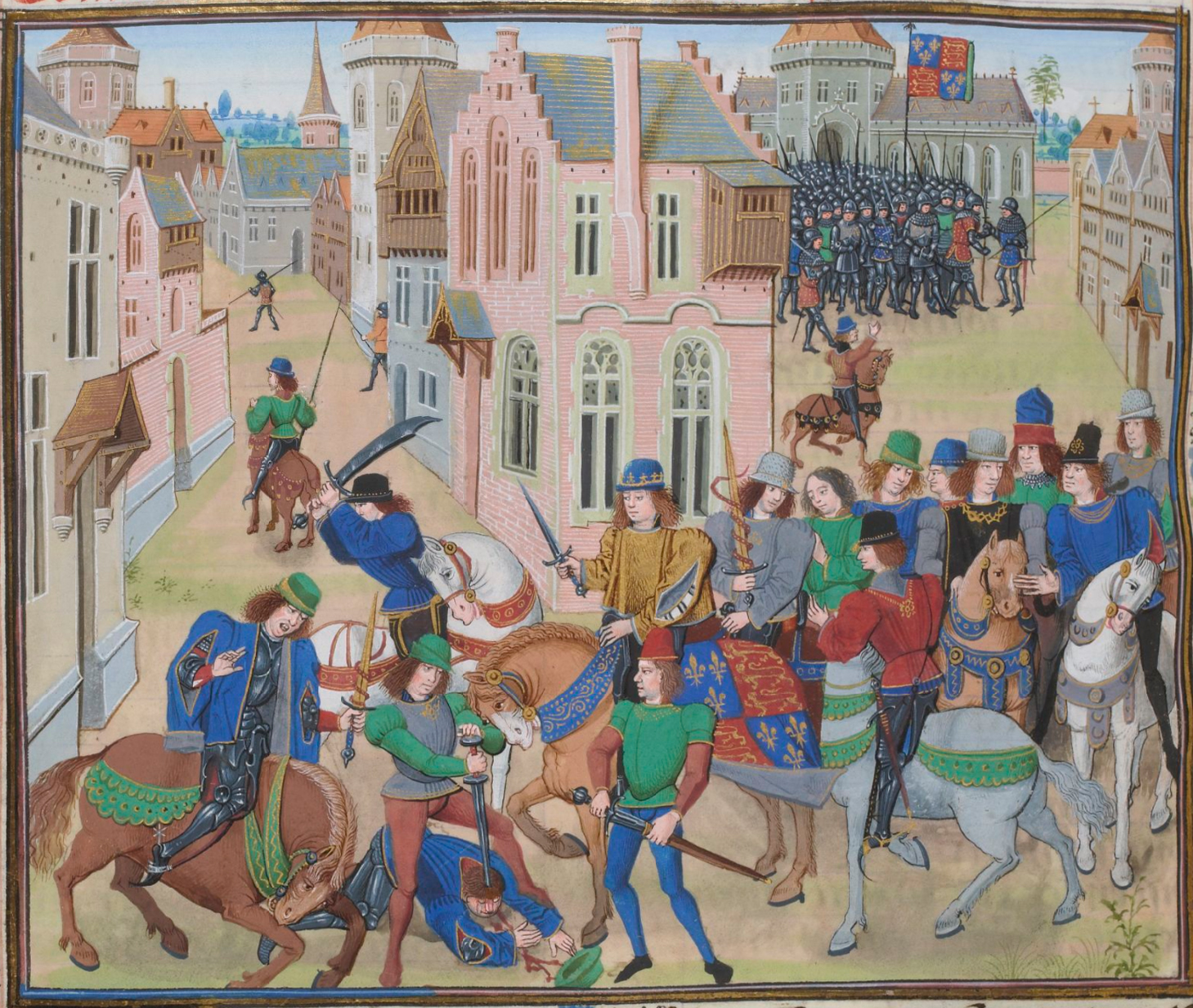
Richard II watches Wat Tyler's death and addresses the peasants in the background: taken from the Gruuthuse manuscript of Froissart's Chroniques (c. 1475)

Whereas the poll tax of 1381 was the spark of the Peasants' Revolt, the root of the conflict lay in tensions between peasants and landowners precipitated by the economic and demographic consequences of the Black Death and subsequent outbreaks of the plague. The rebellion started in Kent and Essex in late May, and on 12 June, bands of peasants gathered at Blackheath near London under the leaders Wat Tyler, John Ball, and Jack Straw. John of Gaunt's Savoy Palace was burnt down. The Archbishop of Canterbury, Simon Sudbury, who was also Lord Chancellor, and Lord High Treasurer Robert Hales were both killed by the rebels, who were demanding the complete abolition of serfdom. The King, sheltered within the Tower of London with his councillors, agreed that the Crown did not have the forces to disperse the rebels and that the only feasible option was to negotiate.

It is unclear how much Richard, who was still only fourteen years old, was involved in these deliberations, although historians have suggested that he was among the proponents of negotiations. The King set out by the River Thames on 13 June, but the large number of people thronging the banks at Greenwich made it impossible for him to land, forcing him to return to the Tower. The next day, Friday, 14 June, he set out by horse and met the rebels at Mile End. He agreed to the rebels' demands, but this move only emboldened them; they continued their looting and killings. Richard met Wat Tyler again the next day at Smithfield and reiterated that the demands would be met, but the rebel leader was not convinced of the King's sincerity. The King's men grew restive, an altercation broke out, and William Walworth, the Lord Mayor of London, pulled Tyler down from his horse and killed him. The situation became tense once the rebels realised what had happened, but the King acted with calm resolve and, saying "I am your captain, follow me!", he led the mob away from the scene. (Note: It has been speculated that the whole incident surrounding the killing of Wat Tyler was in fact planned in advance by the council, in order to end the rebellion.) Walworth meanwhile gathered a force to surround the peasant army, but the King granted clemency and allowed the rebels to disperse and return to their homes.

The King soon revoked the charters of freedom and pardon that he had granted, and as disturbances continued in other parts of the country, he personally went into Essex to suppress the rebellion. On 28 June at Billericay, he defeated the last rebels in a small skirmish and effectively ended the Peasants' Revolt. In the following days rebel leaders, such as John Ball, were hunted down and executed. Despite his young age, Richard had shown great courage and determination in his handling of the rebellion. It is likely, though, that the events impressed upon him the dangers of disobedience and threats to royal authority, and helped shape the absolutist attitudes to kingship that would later prove fatal to his reign.

=== Coming of age ===
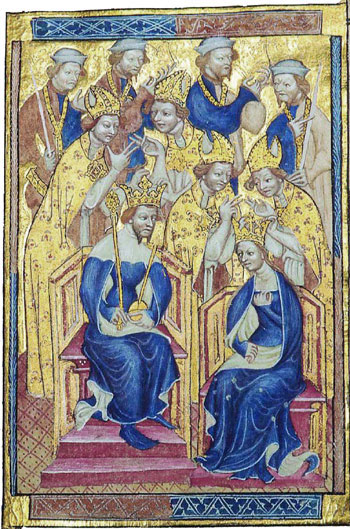
Anne and Richard's coronation in the Liber Regalis of Westminster Abbey

It is only with the Peasants' Revolt that Richard starts to emerge clearly in the annals. One of his first significant acts after the rebellion was to marry Anne of Bohemia, daughter of Holy Roman Emperor Charles IV, on 20 January 1382. It had diplomatic significance; in the division of Europe caused by the Western Schism, Bohemia and the Holy Roman Empire were seen as potential allies against France in the ongoing Hundred Years' War. (Note: While both England and the Empire supported Pope Urban VI in Rome, the French sided with the Avignon Papacy of Clement VII.) This marriage was negotiated by the Silesian Duke and Bohemian Viceroy, Przemyslaus I Noszak, Duke of Cieszyn, based at the Silesian castle of Fryštát in the present-day Czech town of Karviná. This duke also led diplomatic missions between Richard II and Charles IV. Nonetheless, the marriage was not popular in England. Despite great sums of money awarded to the Empire, the political alliance never resulted in any military victories. Furthermore, the marriage was childless. Anne died from the plague in 1394, greatly mourned by her husband.

Michael de la Pole had been instrumental in the marriage negotiations; he had the King's confidence and gradually became more involved at court and in government as Richard came of age. De la Pole came from an upstart merchant family. (Note: A complaint in parliament claimed that he had been "raised from low estate to the rank of earl") When Richard made him chancellor in 1383, and created him Earl of Suffolk two years later, this antagonised the more established nobility. Another member of the close circle around the King was Robert de Vere, Earl of Oxford, who in this period emerged as the King's favourite. Richard's close friendship to de Vere was also disagreeable to the political establishment. This displeasure was exacerbated by the earl's elevation to the new title of Duke of Ireland in 1386. The chronicler Thomas Walsingham suggested the relationship between the King and de Vere was of a homosexual nature, due to a resentment Walsingham had toward the King.

Tensions came to a head over the approach to the war in France. While the court party preferred negotiations, Gaunt and Buckingham urged a large-scale campaign to protect English possessions. Instead, a so-called crusade led by Henry le Despenser, Bishop of Norwich, was dispatched, which failed miserably. Faced with this setback on the continent, Richard turned his attention instead towards France's ally, the Kingdom of Scotland. In 1385, the King himself led a punitive expedition to the north, but the effort came to nothing, and the army had to return without ever engaging the Scots in battle. Meanwhile, only an uprising in Ghent prevented a French invasion of southern England. The relationship between Richard and his uncle Gaunt deteriorated further with military failure, and Gaunt left England to pursue his claim to the throne of Castile in 1386 amid rumours of a plot against his person. With Gaunt gone, the unofficial leadership of the growing dissent against the King and his courtiers passed to Buckingham – who had by now been created Duke of Gloucester – and Richard Fitzalan, 4th Earl of Arundel.

=== First crisis of 1386–1388 ===
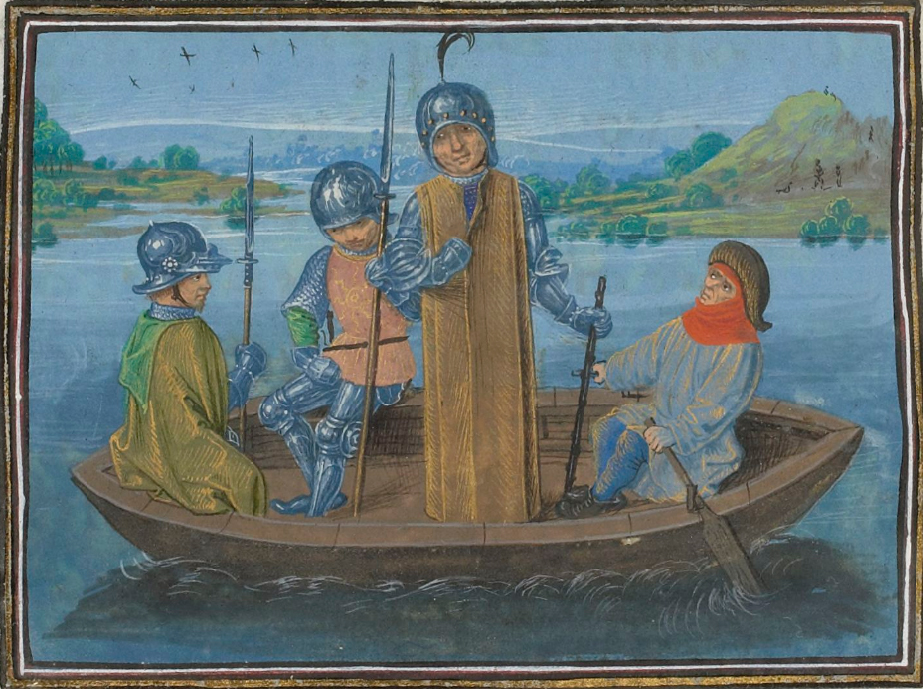
Robert de Vere fleeing the Battle of Radcot Bridge, from the Chroniques of Jean Froissart

The threat of a French invasion did not subside, but instead grew stronger into 1386. At the parliament of October that year, Michael de la Pole – in his capacity of chancellor – requested taxation of an unprecedented level for the defence of the realm. Rather than consenting, the parliament responded by refusing to consider any request until the chancellor was removed. The parliament (later known as the Wonderful Parliament) was presumably working with the support of Gloucester and Arundel. The King famously responded that he would not dismiss as much as a scullion from his kitchen at parliament's request. Only when threatened with deposition was Richard forced to give in and let de la Pole go. A commission was set up to review and control royal finances for a year.

Richard was deeply perturbed by this affront to his royal prerogative, and from February to November 1387 went on a "gyration" (tour) of the country to muster support for his cause. By installing de Vere as Justice of Chester, he began the work of creating a loyal military power base in Cheshire. He also secured a legal ruling from Chief Justice Robert Tresilian that parliament's conduct had been unlawful and treasonable.

On his return to London, the King was confronted by Gloucester, Arundel and Thomas de Beauchamp, 12th Earl of Warwick, who brought an appeal (Note: This "appeal" – which would give its name to the Lords Appellant – was not an appeal in the modern sense of an application to a higher authority. In medieval common law the appeal was a criminal charge, often one of treason.) of treason against de la Pole, de Vere, Tresilian, and two other loyalists: the mayor of London, Nicholas Brembre, and Alexander Neville, the Archbishop of York. Richard stalled the negotiations to gain time, as he was expecting de Vere to arrive from Cheshire with military reinforcements. The three peers then joined forces with Gaunt's son Henry Bolingbroke, Earl of Derby, and Thomas de Mowbray, Earl of Nottingham – the group known to history as the Lords Appellant. On 20 December 1387 they intercepted de Vere at Radcot Bridge, where he and his forces were routed and he was obliged to flee the country.

Richard now had no choice but to comply with the appellants' demands; Brembre and Tresilian were condemned and executed, while de Vere and de la Pole – who had by now also left the country – were sentenced to death in absentia at the Merciless Parliament in February 1388. (Note: Neville, as a man of the clergy, was deprived of his temporalities, also in absentia. The proceedings went further, and a number of Richard's chamber knights were also executed, among these Burley.) The appellants had now succeeded completely in breaking up the circle of favourites around the King.

== Later reign ==
=== A fragile peace ===
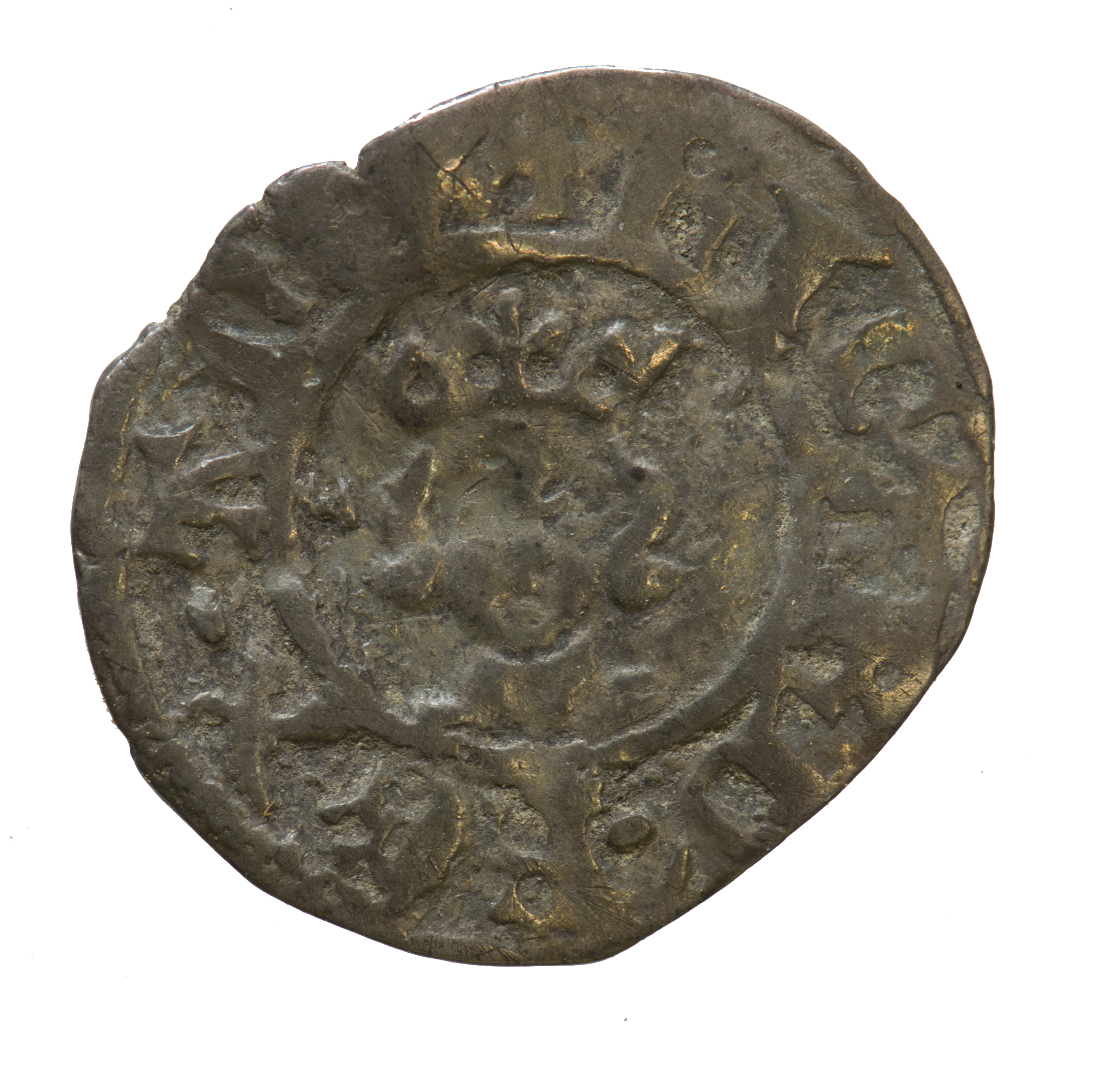
Silver half penny of Richard II, York Museums Trust

Richard gradually re-established royal authority in the months after the deliberations of the Merciless Parliament. The aggressive foreign policy of the Lords Appellant failed when their efforts to build a wide, anti-French coalition came to nothing, and the north of England fell victim to a Scottish incursion. Richard was now over twenty-one years old and could with confidence claim the right to govern in his own name. Furthermore, John of Gaunt returned to England in 1389 and settled his differences with the King, after which the old statesman acted as a moderating influence on English politics. Richard assumed full control of the government on 3 May 1389, claiming that the difficulties of the past years had been due solely to bad councillors. He outlined a foreign policy that reversed the actions of the appellants by seeking peace and reconciliation with France, and promised to lessen the burden of taxation on the people significantly. Richard ruled peacefully for the next eight years, having reconciled with his former adversaries. Still, later events would show that he had not forgotten the indignities he perceived. In particular, the execution of his former teacher Sir Simon de Burley was an insult not easily forgotten.

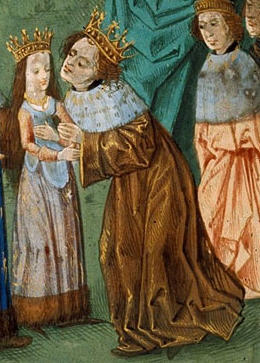
Richard and Isabella on their wedding day in 1396. She was six – he was 29.

With national stability secured, Richard began negotiating a permanent peace with France. A proposal put forward in 1393 would have greatly expanded the territory of Aquitaine possessed by the English Crown. However, the plan failed because it included a requirement that the English king pay homage to the King of France—a condition that proved unacceptable to the English public. Instead, in 1396, a truce was agreed to, which was to last 28 years. As part of the truce, Richard agreed to marry Isabella of Valois, daughter of Charles VI of France, when she came of age. There were some misgivings about the betrothal, in particular, because the princess was then only six years old and thus would not be able to produce an heir to the throne of England for many years. (Note: As it turned out, she never did produce an heir: just four years later, Richard was dead.)

Although Richard sought peace with France, he took a different approach to the situation in Ireland. The English lordships in Ireland were in danger of being overrun by the Gaelic Irish kingdoms, and the Anglo-Irish lords were pleading for the King to intervene. In the autumn of 1394, Richard left for Ireland, where he remained until May 1395. His army of more than 8,000 men was the largest force brought to the island during the late Middle Ages. The invasion was a success, and a number of Irish chieftains submitted to English overlordship. It was one of the most successful achievements of Richard's reign, and strengthened his support at home, although the consolidation of the English position in Ireland proved to be short-lived.

In 1395 Richard II adopted the attributed arms of King Edward the Confessor and impaling the royal arms of England, denoting a mystical union.

=== Second crisis of 1397–1399 ===
The period that historians refer to as the "tyranny" of Richard II began towards the end of the 1390s. The King had Gloucester, Arundel and Warwick arrested in July 1397. The timing of these arrests and Richard's motivation are not entirely clear. Although one chronicle suggested that a plot was being planned against the King, there is no evidence that this was the case. It is more likely that Richard had simply come to feel strong enough to safely retaliate against these three men for their role in events of 1386–1388 and eliminate them as threats to his power.

Arundel was the first of the three to be brought to trial, at the parliament of September 1397. After a heated quarrel with the King, he was condemned and executed. Gloucester was being held prisoner by the Earl of Nottingham at Calais while awaiting his trial. As the time for the trial drew near, Nottingham brought news that Gloucester was dead. It is thought likely that the King had ordered him to be killed to avoid the disgrace of executing a prince of the blood.

Warwick was also condemned to death, but his life was spared and his sentence reduced to life imprisonment. Arundel's brother Thomas Arundel, the Archbishop of Canterbury, was exiled for life. Richard then took his persecution of adversaries to the localities. While recruiting retainers for himself in various counties, he prosecuted local men who had been loyal to the appellants. The fines levied on these men brought great revenues to the crown, although contemporary chroniclers raised questions about the legality of the proceedings.

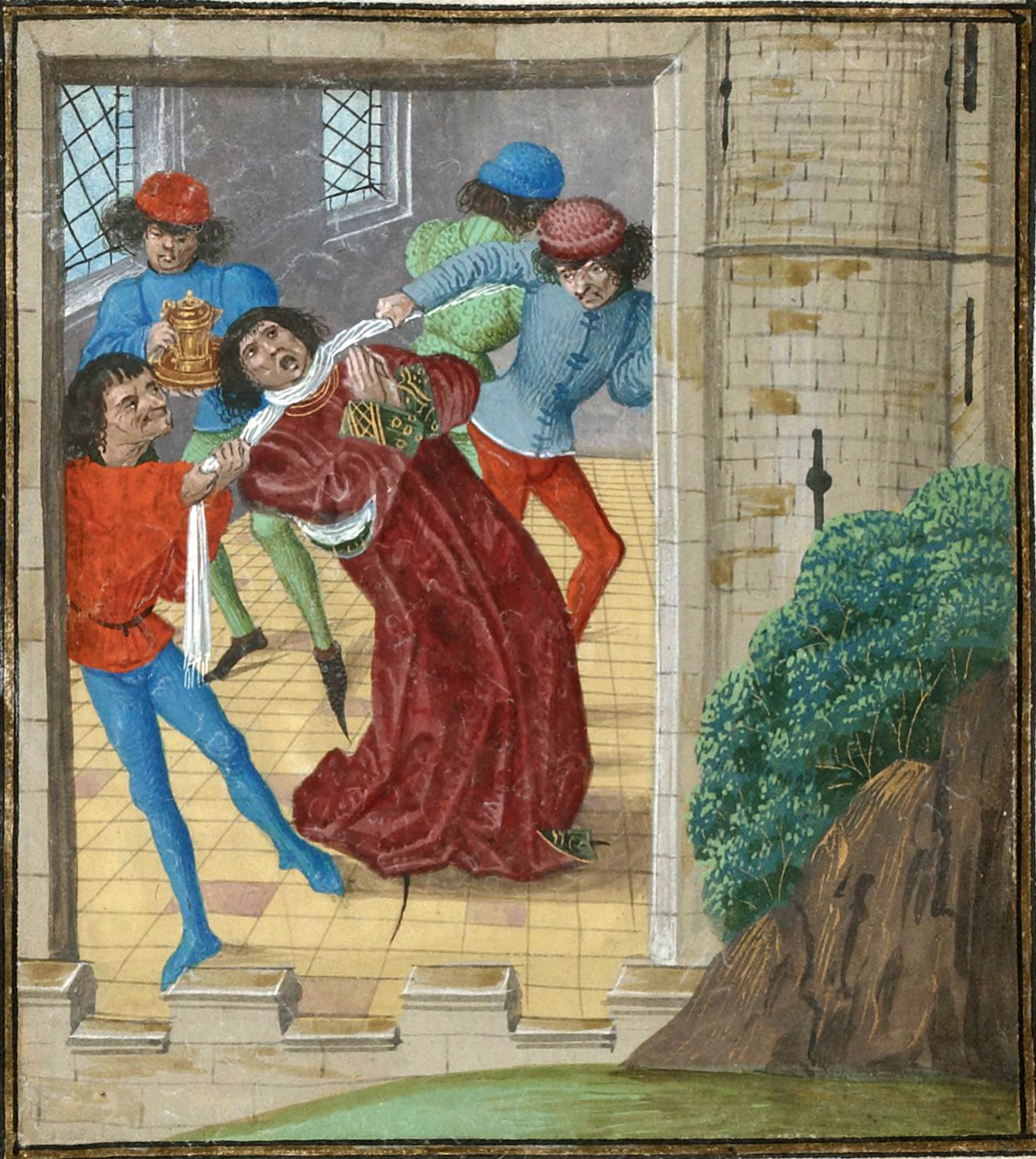
Murder of Thomas of Woodstock in Calais in 1397

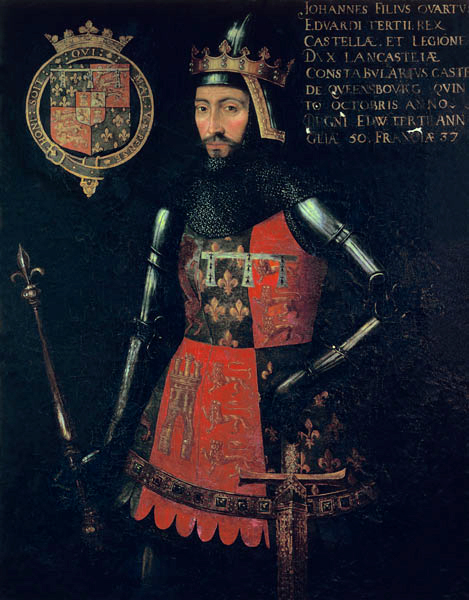
John of Gaunt had been at the centre of English politics for over thirty years, and his death in 1399 led to insecurity.

These actions were made possible primarily through the collusion of John of Gaunt, but with the support of a large group of other magnates, many of whom were rewarded with new titles, and were disparagingly referred to as Richard's "duketti". These included the former Lords Appellant

- Henry Bolingbroke, Earl of Derby, who was made Duke of Hereford, and
- Thomas de Mowbray, Earl of Nottingham, who was created Duke of Norfolk.

Also among them were

- John Holland, the King's half-brother, promoted from Earl of Huntingdon to Duke of Exeter
- Thomas Holland, the King's nephew, promoted from Earl of Kent to Duke of Surrey
- Edward of Norwich, Earl of Rutland, the King's cousin, who received Gloucester's French title of Duke of Aumale
- Gaunt's son John Beaufort, 1st Earl of Somerset, who was made Marquess of Somerset and Marquess of Dorset
- John Montacute, 3rd Earl of Salisbury
- Lord Thomas le Despenser, who became Earl of Gloucester. (Note: John Beaufort was the oldest of John of Gaunt's children with Katherine Swynford; illegitimate children whom Richard had given legitimate status in 1390. He was made Marquess of Dorset; marquess being a relatively new title in England up until this point. Rutland, heir to the Duke of York, was created Duke of Aumale. John Montacute had succeeded his uncle as Earl of Salisbury earlier the same year. Thomas Despenser, the great-grandson of Hugh Despenser the Younger, Edward II's favourite who was executed for treason in 1326, was given the forfeited earldom of Gloucester.)

With the forfeited lands of the convicted appellants, the King could reward these men with lands suited to their new ranks.

A threat to Richard's authority still existed, however, in the form of the House of Lancaster, represented by John of Gaunt and his son Henry Bolingbroke, Duke of Hereford. The House of Lancaster not only possessed greater wealth than any other family in England, they were of royal descent and, as such, likely candidates to succeed the childless Richard.

Discord broke out in the inner circles of court in December 1397, when Bolingbroke and Mowbray became embroiled in a quarrel. According to Bolingbroke, Mowbray had claimed that the two, as former Lords Appellant, were next in line for royal retribution. Mowbray vehemently denied these charges, as such a claim would have amounted to treason. A parliamentary committee decided that the two should settle the matter by battle, but at the last moment Richard exiled the two dukes instead: Mowbray for life, Bolingbroke for ten years.

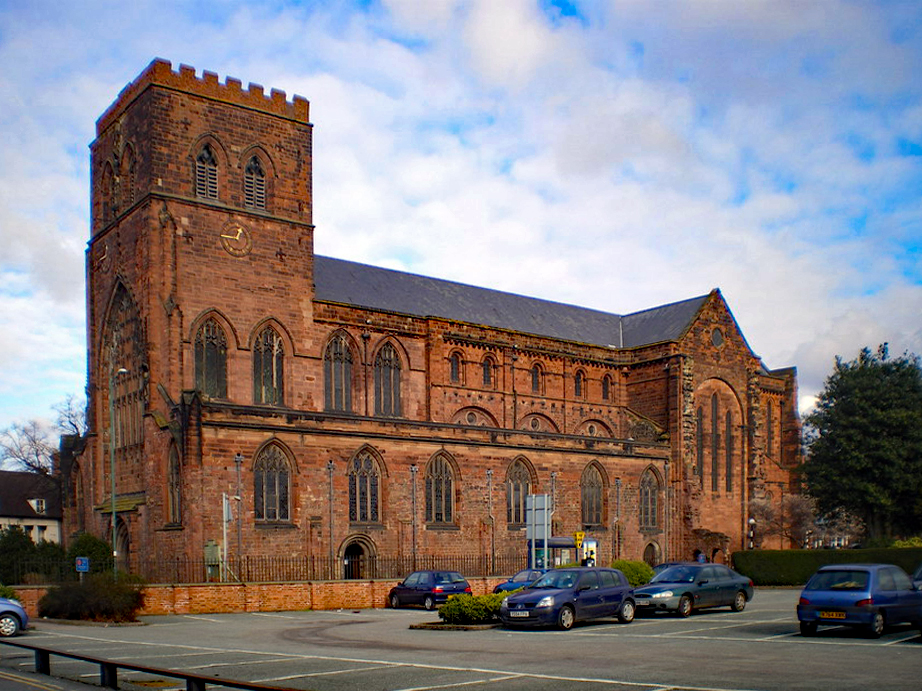
Shrewsbury Abbey, thought to be the venue of the Revenge Parliament, which was prorogued in Westminster and moved to Shropshire

In 1398 Richard summoned the Parliament of Shrewsbury, often called the Revenge Parliament and understood to have met in the Abbey of that town, which declared all the acts of the Merciless Parliament to be null and void, and announced that no restraint could legally be put on the King. It delegated all parliamentary power to a committee of twelve lords and six commoners chosen from the King's friends, making Richard an absolute ruler unbound by the necessity of gathering a Parliament again.

On 3 February 1399, Gaunt died. Rather than allowing Bolingbroke to succeed, Richard extended the term of his exile to life and expropriated his properties. The King felt safe from Bolingbroke, who was residing in Paris, since the French had little interest in any challenge to Richard and his peace policy. Richard left the country in May for another expedition in Ireland.

=== Court culture ===
In the last years of Richard's reign, and particularly in the months after the suppression of the appellants in 1397, the King enjoyed a virtual monopoly on power in the country, a relatively uncommon situation in medieval England. In this period a particular court culture was allowed to emerge, one that differed sharply from that of earlier times. A new form of address developed; where the King previously had been addressed simply as "highness", now "royal majesty", or "high majesty" were often used. It was said that on solemn festivals Richard would sit on his throne in the royal hall for hours without speaking, and anyone on whom his eyes fell had to bow his knees to the King. The inspiration for this new sumptuousness and emphasis on dignity came from the courts on the continent, not only the French and Bohemian courts that had been the homes of Richard's two wives, but also the court that his father had maintained while residing in Aquitaine.

Richard's approach to kingship was rooted in his strong belief in the royal prerogative, the inspiration of which can be found in his early youth, when his authority was challenged first by the Peasants' Revolts and then by the Lords Appellant. Richard rejected the approach his grandfather Edward III had taken to the nobility. Edward's court had been a martial one, based on the interdependence between the king and his most trusted noblemen as military captains. In Richard's view, this put a dangerous amount of power in the hands of the baronage. To avoid dependence on the nobility for military recruitment, he pursued a policy of peace towards France. At the same time, he developed his own private military retinue, larger than that of any English king before him, and gave them livery badges with his White Hart. He was then free to develop a courtly atmosphere in which the king was a distant, venerated figure, and art and culture, rather than warfare, were at the centre.

== Patronage and the arts ==
The Wilton Diptych, showing Richard venerating the Virgin and Child, accompanied by his patron saints: Edmund the Martyr, Edward the Confessor, and John the Baptist. The angels in the picture wear the White Hart badge. National Gallery, London.

As part of Richard's programme of asserting his authority, he also tried to cultivate the royal image. Unlike any other English king before him, he had himself portrayed in panel paintings of elevated majesty, of which two survive: an over life-size Westminster Abbey portrait (c. 1390), and the Wilton Diptych (1394–1399), a portable work probably intended to accompany Richard on his Irish campaign. It is one of the few surviving English examples of the courtly International Gothic style of painting that was developed in the courts of the Continent, especially Prague and Paris. Richard's expenditure on jewellery, rich textiles and metalwork was far higher than on paintings, but as with his illuminated manuscripts, there are hardly any surviving works that can be connected with him, except for a crown, "one of the finest achievements of the Gothic goldsmith", that probably belonged to his wife Anne.

Among Richard's grandest projects in the field of architecture was Westminster Hall, which was extensively rebuilt during his reign, perhaps spurred on by the completion in 1391 of John of Gaunt's magnificent hall at Kenilworth Castle. Fifteen life-size statues of kings were placed in niches on the walls, and the hammer-beam roof by the royal carpenter Hugh Herland, "the greatest creation of medieval timber architecture", allowed the original three Romanesque aisles to be replaced with a single huge open space, with a dais at the end for Richard to sit in solitary state. The rebuilding had been begun by Henry III in 1245, but had by Richard's time been dormant for over a century.

The court's patronage of literature is especially important because this was the period in which the English language took shape as a literary language. There is little evidence to tie Richard directly to the patronage of poetry, but it was nevertheless within his court that this culture was allowed to thrive. The greatest poet of the age, Geoffrey Chaucer, served the King as a diplomat, a customs official and a clerk of The King's Works while producing some of his best-known work. Chaucer was also in the service of John of Gaunt, and wrote The Book of the Duchess as a eulogy to Gaunt's wife Blanche. Chaucer's colleague and friend John Gower wrote his Confessio Amantis on a direct commission from Richard, although he later grew disenchanted with the King.

Richard was interested in occult topics such as geomancy, which he viewed as a greater discipline that included philosophy, science, and alchemic elements and commissioned a book on, and sponsored writing and discussion of them in his court.

== Downfall ==
=== Deposition ===
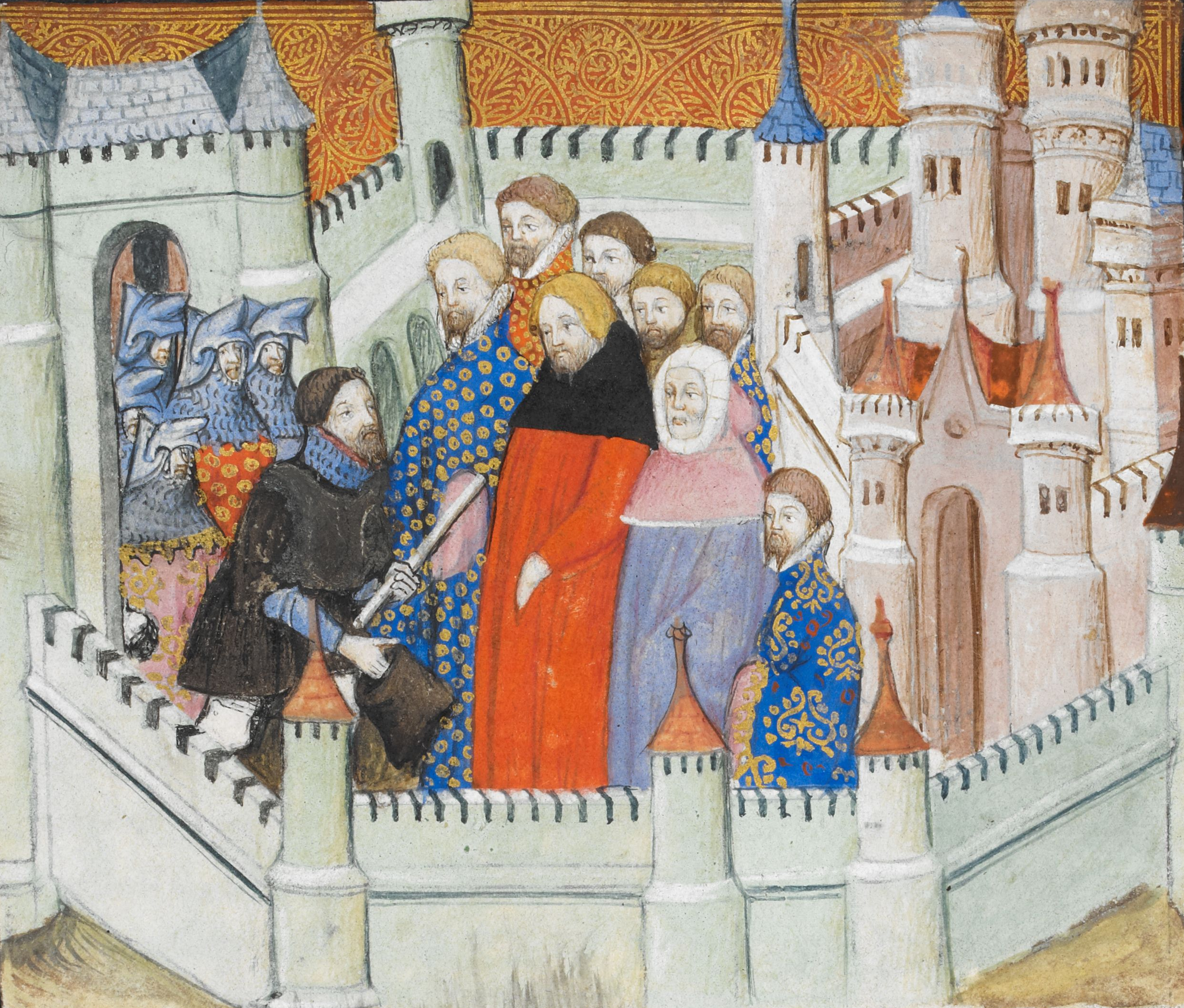
Richard's surrender to Henry at Flint Castle in Wales

In June 1399, Louis I, Duke of Orléans, gained control of the court of the insane Charles VI of France. The policy of rapprochement with the English crown did not suit Louis's political ambitions, and for this reason he found it opportune to allow Bolingbroke to leave for England. With a small group of followers, Bolingbroke landed at Ravenspurn in Yorkshire towards the end of June 1399. Insisting that his only object was to regain his own patrimony, Bolingbroke received the support of both of the preeminent northern magnates, Henry Percy, Earl of Northumberland, and Ralph Neville, Earl of Westmorland. The King had taken most of his household knights and the loyal members of his nobility with him to Ireland, so Bolingbroke experienced little resistance as he moved south. The Keeper of the Realm, Edmund, Duke of York, had little choice but to side with Bolingbroke. Meanwhile, Richard was delayed in his return from Ireland and did not land in Wales until 24 July. He made his way to Conwy, where on 12 August he met with Northumberland for negotiations. On 19 August, Richard surrendered to Bolingbroke at Flint Castle, promising to abdicate if his life were spared. Both men then made their way to Chester Castle where Richard was held in the crypt of the Agricola Tower. On the journey to London, the indignant king had to ride all the way behind Bolingbroke. On arrival, he was imprisoned in the Tower of London on 1 September.

It was now argued that Richard, through his tyranny and misgovernment, had rendered himself unworthy of being king. According to the normal law of primogeniture, the heir to the throne at this point would have been Edmund Mortimer, Earl of March, great-grandson of Edward III's second son to reach adulthood, Lionel, Duke of Clarence, through Lionel's daughter Philippa. Bolingbroke's father, John of Gaunt, was Edward's next eldest son. However, in 1376 Edward had entailed the succession to heirs male, bypassing Philippa and her descendants in favour of his next eldest son, John of Gaunt, and thence his son Henry Bolingbroke. Richard's own view of the question during his reign is uncertain, but his assignment in 1397 of the highest place in the order of precedence to Bolingbroke suggests endorsement of his status as heir presumptive.

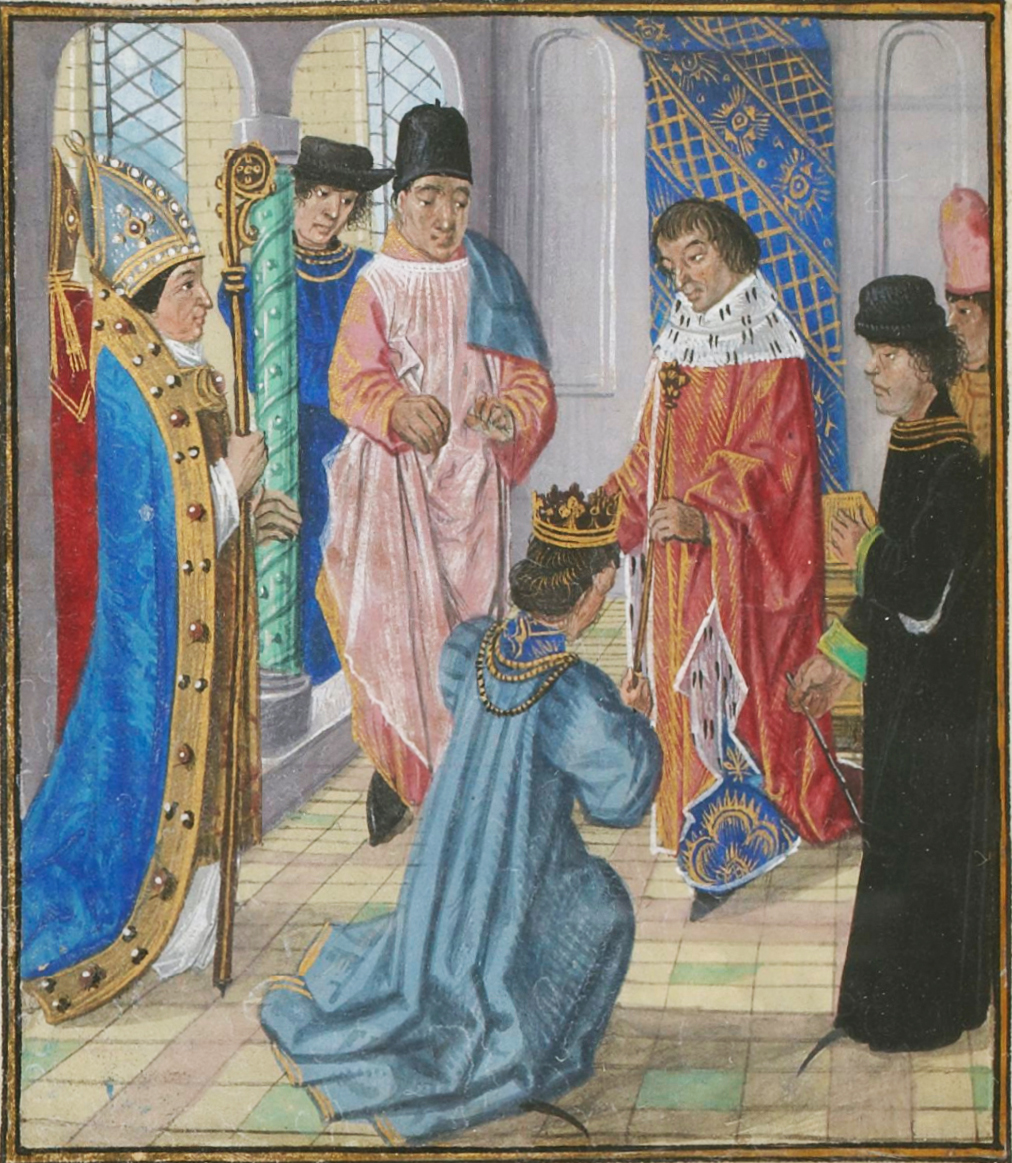
Richard surrendering the crown to Henry

According to the official record, read by the Archbishop of Canterbury during an assembly of lords and commons at Westminster Hall on Tuesday 30 September, Richard gave up his crown willingly and ratified his deposition citing as a reason his own unworthiness as a monarch. In contrast, the Traison et Mort Chronicle suggests otherwise. It describes a meeting between Richard and Henry that took place one day before the parliament's session. The King succumbed to blind rage, ordered his own release from the Tower, called his cousin a traitor, demanded to see his wife, and swore revenge, throwing down his bonnet, while Henry refused to do anything without parliamentary approval. When parliament met to discuss Richard's fate, John Trevor, Bishop of St Asaph, read thirty-three articles of deposition that were unanimously accepted by lords and commons. On 1 October 1399, Richard II was formally deposed. On 13 October, the feast day of Edward the Confessor, Henry was crowned king.

=== Death ===
Henry had agreed to let Richard live after his abdication. This changed when it was revealed that the earls of Huntingdon, Kent, and Salisbury, and Lord Despenser, and possibly also the Earl of Rutland – all now demoted from the ranks they had been given by Richard – were planning to murder the new king and restore Richard in the Epiphany Rising. Although averted, the plot highlighted the danger of allowing Richard to live. He is thought to have died of starvation while in captivity in Pontefract Castle on or around 14 February 1400, although there is some question over the date and manner of his death. His body was taken south from Pontefract and displayed in St Paul's Cathedral on 17 February before burial in Kings Langley Priory on 6 March.

Rumours that Richard was still alive persisted, but never gained much credence in England; in Scotland, however, a man identified as Richard came into the hands of Regent Albany, lodged in Stirling Castle, and served as the notional – and perhaps reluctant – figurehead of various anti-Lancastrian and Lollard intrigues in England. Henry IV's government dismissed him as an impostor, and several sources from both sides of the border suggest the man had a mental illness, one also describing him as a "beggar" by the time of his death in 1419, but he was buried as a king in Blackfriars, Stirling, the local Dominican friary. Meanwhile, Henry V – in an effort both to atone for his father's act of murder and to silence the rumours of Richard's survival – had decided to have the body at Kings Langley reinterred in Westminster Abbey on 4 December 1413. Here Richard himself had prepared an elaborate tomb, where the remains of his wife Anne were already entombed.

== Character and assessment ==
Contemporary writers, even those less sympathetic to the King, agreed that Richard was a "most beautiful king", though with an unmanly "face which was white, rounded and feminine." He was athletic and tall; when his tomb was opened in 1871, he was found to be six feet (1.82 m) tall. He was also intelligent and well read, and when agitated he had a tendency to stammer. While the Westminster Abbey portrait probably shows a good similarity of the King, the Wilton Diptych portrays him as significantly younger than he was at the time; it must be assumed that he had a beard by this point. Religiously, he was orthodox, and particularly towards the end of his reign he became a strong opponent of the Lollard heresy. He was particularly devoted to the cult of Edward the Confessor, and around 1395 he had his own coat of arms impaled with the mythical arms of the Confessor. Though not a warrior king like his grandfather, Richard nevertheless enjoyed tournaments, as well as hunting.

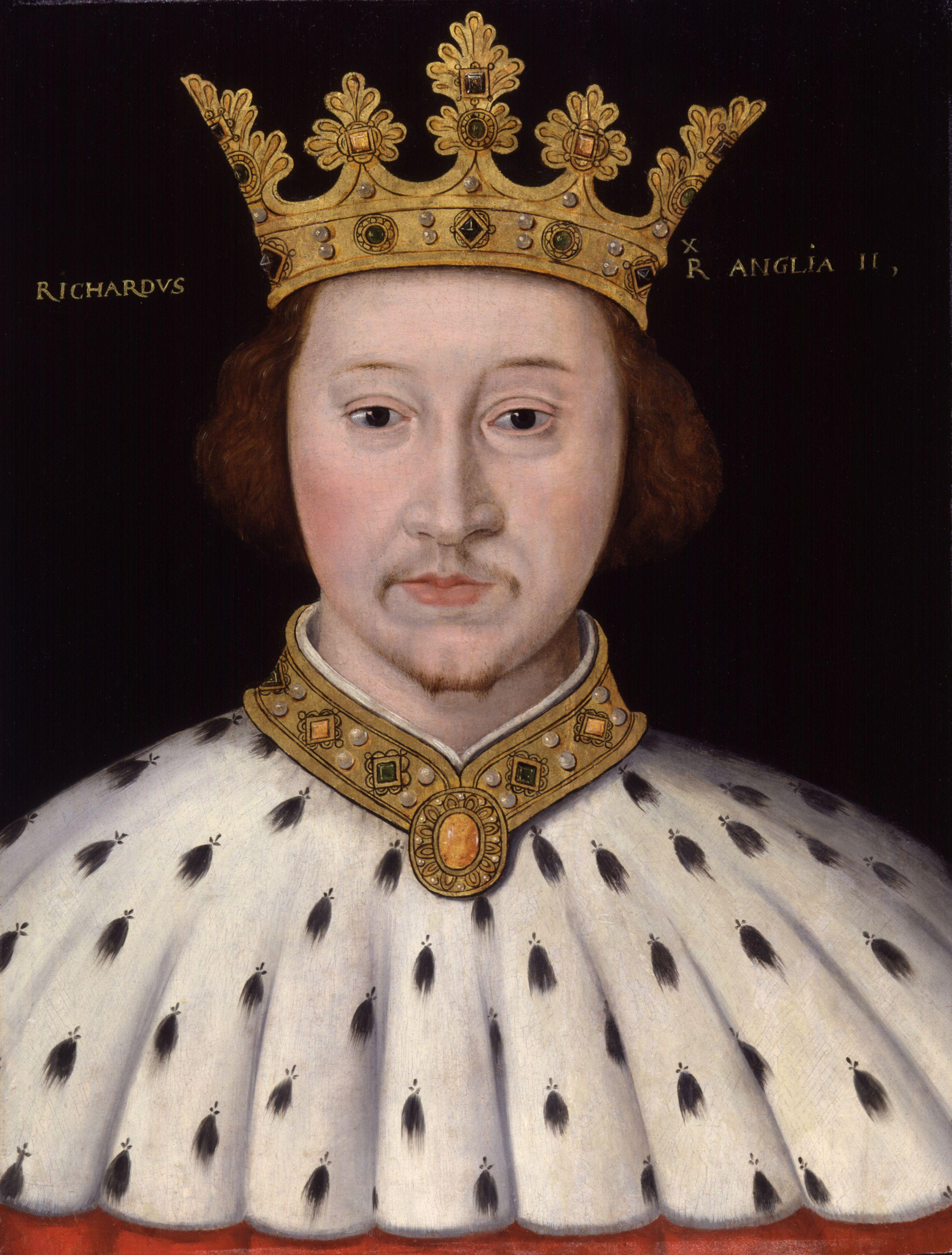
Anonymous artist's impression of Richard II in the 16th century. National Portrait Gallery, London.

The popular view of Richard has more than anything been influenced by Shakespeare's play about the King, Richard II. Shakespeare's Richard was a cruel, vindictive, and irresponsible king, who attained a semblance of greatness only after his fall from power. Writing a work of fiction, Shakespeare took many liberties and made great omissions, basing his play on works by writers such as Edward Hall and Samuel Daniel, who in turn based their writings on contemporary chroniclers such as Thomas Walsingham. Hall and Daniel were part of Tudor historiography, which was highly unsympathetic to Richard, although it also viewed his deposition as a misdeed which provoked divine retribution. The Tudor orthodoxy, reinforced by Shakespeare, saw a continuity in civil discord starting with Richard's misrule that did not end until Henry VII's accession in 1485. The idea that Richard was to blame for the later-15th century Wars of the Roses was prevalent as late as the 19th century, but came to be challenged in the 20th. Some recent historians prefer to look at the Wars of the Roses in isolation from the reign of Richard II.

Richard's mental state has been a major issue of historical debate since the first academic historians started treating the subject in the 19th century. One of the first modern historians to deal with Richard II as a king and as a person was Bishop Stubbs. Stubbs argued that towards the end of his reign, Richard's mind "was losing its balance altogether." Historian Anthony Steel, who wrote a full-scale biography of the King in 1941, took a psychiatric approach to the issue, and concluded that Richard had schizophrenia. This was challenged by V. H. Galbraith, who argued that there was no historical basis for such a diagnosis, a line that has also been followed by later historians of the period, such as Anthony Goodman and Anthony Tuck. Nigel Saul, who wrote an academic biography of Richard II in 1997, concedes that – even though there is no basis for assuming the King had a mental illness – he showed clear signs of a narcissistic personality, and towards the end of his reign "Richard's grasp on reality was becoming weaker."

One of the primary historiographical questions surrounding Richard concerns his political agenda and the reasons for its failure. His kingship was thought to contain elements of the early modern absolute monarchy as exemplified by the Tudor dynasty. More recently, Richard's concept of kingship has been seen by some as not so different from that of his antecedents, and that it was exactly by staying within the framework of traditional monarchy that he was able to achieve as much as he did. Yet his actions were too extreme and too abrupt. For one, the absence of war was meant to reduce the burden of taxation, and so help Richard's popularity with the Commons in parliament. However, this promise was never fulfilled, as the cost of the royal retinue, the opulence of court and Richard's lavish patronage of his favourites proved as expensive as war had been, without offering commensurate benefits. As for his policy of military retaining, this was later emulated by Edward IV and Henry VII, but Richard II's exclusive reliance on the county of Cheshire hurt his support from the rest of the country. Simon Walker writes: "What he sought was, in contemporary terms, neither unjustified nor unattainable; it was the manner of his seeking that betrayed him."

== Family tree ==
Ancestors of Richard II of England

8. Edward II of England
4. Edward III of England
9. Isabella of France
2. Edward the Black Prince
10. William I, Count of Hainaut
5. Philippa of Hainaut
11. Joan of Valois
1. Richard II of England
12. Edward I of England
6. Edmund of Woodstock, 1st Earl of Kent
13. Margaret of France
3. Joan, 4th Countess of Kent
14. John Wake, 1st Baron Wake
7. Margaret Wake, 3rd Baroness Wake
15. Joan Fiennes

Family of Richard II of England

Edmund of Woodstock; Earl of Kent | Edward of Windsor Edward III r. 1327–1377
Thomas Holland; Earl of Kent | Joan; Countess of Kent | Edward of Woodstock; The Black Prince | Lionel of Antwerp; Duke of Clarence | John of Gaunt; Duke of Lancaster | Edmund of Langley; Duke of York | Thomas of Woodstock; Duke of Gloucester
John Holland; Duke of Exeter | Thomas Holland; Earl of Kent | Richard of Bordeaux Richard II r. 1377–1399 | Philippa of Clarence; Countess of Ulster | Henry Bolingbroke Henry IV r. 1399–1413 | Edward of Norwich; Duke of York
Thomas Holland; Duke of Surrey | Alianore Holland; Countess of March | Roger Mortimer; Earl of March | Henry of Monmouth Henry V r. 1413–1422
Edmund Mortimer; Earl of March

== See also ==
- Cultural depictions of Richard II of England
- List of earls in the reign of Richard II of England

== Sources ==
- Alexander, Jonathan; Binski, Paul, eds. (1987). Age of Chivalry, Art in Plantagenet England, 1200–1400. London: Royal Academy / Weidenfeld & Nicolson.
- Allmand, Christopher (1988). The Hundred Years War: England and France at War c. 1300 – c. 1450. Cambridge University Press. ISBN 0-5213-1923-4.
- Bennett, Michael (1998). "Edward III's Entail and the Succession to the Crown, 1376–1471". The English Historical Review. 113 (452): 580–609. doi:10.1093/ehr/CXIII.452.580.
- Bennett, Michael J. (1999). Richard II and the Revolution of 1399. Stroud: Sutton Publishing. ISBN 0-7509-2283-4. OL 15298680M.
- Castor, Helen (2000). The King, the Crown, and the Duchy of Lancaster: Public Authority and Private Power, 1399–1461. Oxford University Press. pp. 8–21. ISBN 0-1982-0622-4.
- Dodd, Gwilym, ed. (2000). The Reign of Richard II. Stroud: Tempus. ISBN 0-7524-1797-5.
- Froissart, Jean (1978). Brereton, Geoffrey (ed.). Chronicles. London: Penguin. ISBN 0-1404-4200-6.
- Gillespie, James; Goodman, Anthony, eds. (1997). The Age of Richard II. Stroud: Sutton Publishing. ISBN 0-7509-1452-1.
- ——; ——, eds. (1998). Richard II: The Art of Kingship. Oxford: Clarendon Press. ISBN 0-1982-0189-3.
- Given-Wilson, Chris, ed. (1993). Chronicles of the Revolution, 1397–1400: The Reign of Richard II. Manchester: Manchester University Press. ISBN 0-7190-3526-0.
- Goodman, Anthony (1971). The Loyal Conspiracy: The Lords Appellant under Richard II. London: Routledge. ISBN 0-7100-7074-8.
- —— (1992). John of Gaunt: The Exercise of Princely Power in Fourteenth-Century Europe. Burnt Mill, Harlow, Essex: Longman. ISBN 0-5820-9813-0.
- Harriss, Gerald (2005). Shaping the Nation: England, 1360–1461. Oxford University Press. ISBN 0-1982-2816-3.
- Hilton, Rodney (1973). Bond Men Made Free: Medieval Peasant Movements and the English Rising of 1381. London: Temple Smith. ISBN 0-8511-7039-0. OL 21441508M.
- Jones, Michael, ed. (2000). The New Cambridge Medieval History, vol. 6: c. 1300 – c. 1415. Cambridge University Press. ISBN 0-5213-6290-3.
- Keen, Maurice (1973). England in the Late Middle Ages. London: Methuen. ISBN 0-4167-5990-4.
- Knighton, Henry (1995). Martin, G.H. (ed.). Knighton's Chronicle 1337–1396. Oxford: Clarendon Press. ISBN 0-1982-0503-1.
- Levey, Michael (1971). Painting at Court. London: Weidenfeld and Nicolson.
- McKisack, May (1959). The Fourteenth Century: 1307–1399. Oxford University Press. ISBN 0-1982-1712-9.
- Mortimer, Ian (2007). The Fears of King Henry IV: The Life of England's Self-Made King. London: Jonathan Cape. ISBN 978-0-2240-7300-4.
- Saul, Nigel (1997). Richard II. New Haven: Yale University Press. ISBN 0-3000-7003-9. OL 997357M.
- —— (2005). The Three Richards: Richard I, Richard II and Richard III. London: Hambledon. ISBN 1-8528-5286-0.
- Steel, Anthony (1941). Richard II. Cambridge University Press.
- Stow, George B., ed. (1977). Historia Vitae et Regni Ricardi Secundi. Philadelphia: University of Pennsylvania Press. ISBN 0-8122-7718-X.
- Tuck, Anthony (1985). Crown and Nobility 1272–1461: Political Conflict in Late Medieval England. London: Fontana. ISBN 0-0068-6084-2.
- Walsingham, Thomas (1862–1864). Riley, H.T. (ed.). Historia Anglicana. London: Longman, Roberts, and Green. OL 15966037W.

Richard II of England House of Plantagenet Born: 6 January 1367 Died: 14 February 1400
Regnal titles
| Preceded by Edward III | King of England; Lord of Ireland; 1377–1399 | Succeeded by Henry IV |
| Preceded by Edward III | Duke of Aquitaine; 1377–1390 | Succeeded by John of Gaunt |
Peerage of England
| Vacant Title last held by English title:Edward the Black Prince; Welsh title: Dafydd ap Gruffudd (1283) | Prince of Wales; 1376–1377 | Vacant Title next held by English title:Henry of Monmouth; Welsh title: Owain Glyndwr (Pretender 1400/15) |
