= Richard Tuck =

British academic

Richard Francis Tuck FBA (born 9 January 1949) is a British academic, political theorist and historian of political thought.

== Life and career ==
Tuck was born in 1949, the son of Professor J. P. and Jane Tuck and the younger brother of Anthony Tuck. He was educated at the Royal Grammar School, Newcastle upon Tyne, and Jesus College, Cambridge, where he read history and graduated with BA and PhD degrees. He taught at the University of Cambridge from 1973 to 1995, where he was a Fellow of Jesus College. He then joined the faculty of Harvard University, where he teaches as the Frank G. Thomson Professor of Government. He was elected a Fellow of the British Academy in 1994.

== Views on Brexit and the European Union ==
In his opinion-article, "The Left Case for Brexit" published by the Dissent, Tuck maintains that "the left’s natural position should still be one of opposition to the EU," and that Brexit would open up political possibilities for the Left. In a 17 July, 2017 talk at the Policy Exchange entitled "Brexit: A Prize in Reach for the Left," Tuck advocates for a "genuine Brexit followed by a Labour government" that would both tactically "stall the movement towards independence in Scotland" and politically allow Britain to enact leftist policies, free from the "far-reaching restrictions which the EU imposes on traditional socialism." Tuck also co-authored a November 2017 "Brexit Proposal" with Dr. Christopher Bickerton of Cambridge University. Tuck favours historical international organisations such as the International Labour Organization (ILO) and domestic institutions such as the National Health Service (NHS), which promote socialist goals without compromising democratic processes. In contrast, he cautions against European Union (EU)'s imposition of neo-liberal structures that meet right-wing goals. Tuck criticises the technocratic elite, and regards Brexit referendum as the expression of democratic sovereignty.

== Books ==
- Natural Rights Theories: Their Origin and Development. Cambridge: Cambridge University Press, 1979
- Hobbes: A Very Short Introduction. Oxford: Oxford University Press, 1989 ISBN 978-0-19287668-3
- Philosophy and Government 1572–1651. Cambridge: Cambridge University Press, 1993
- Rights of War and Peace: Political Thought and the International Order from Grotius to Kant. Oxford: University of Oxford Press, 1999
- Free Riding. Cambridge: Harvard University Press, 2008
- The Sleeping Sovereign. Cambridge: Cambridge University Press, 2016

== Interviews ==
- "Democratic Sovereignty and Brexit: A Conversation with Richard Tuck on Political Theory and Practice" International Critical Thought Volume 8, issue 4, 2018.
- "Richard Tuck on Free Riding" Philosophy Bites podcast, Feb. 10. 2008.
