= David Ditchburn =

Scottish historian

David Ditchburn is a Scottish historian. He is a senior lecturer at Trinity College Dublin.

== Publications ==
- Aberdeen before 1800: A New History, East Linton: Tuckwell Press, 2002 [co-edited with Patricia Dennison and Michael Lynch, Edinburgh] ISBN 1862321140
- Scotland and Europe: The Medieval Kingdom and its Contacts with Christendom, c.1215-1545. Volume 1: Religion, Culture and Commerce. East Linton: Tuckwell Press, 2001. ISBN 1-86232-172-8.
- Freedom and Authority: Scotland, c.1050-1650. East Linton: Tuckwell Press, 2000. [co-edited with Terry Brotherstone, Aberdeen]
- Atlas of Medieval Europe. London: Routledge, 1997. [co-edited with Angus Mackay, Edinburgh] ISBN 0415122317 Also published in Spanish edition as Atlas de Europa Medieval, Madrid: Cátedra, 1999
- 'Medieval Scotland, 1100-1560', in R.A. Houston and W. Knox (eds.), The New Penguin History of Scotland. London: Penguin, 2001. [with Alastair J Macdonald, Aberdeen] ISBN 0-14-026367-5
