= Terry Brotherstone =

British historian

Terry Brotherstone is a historian based in Scotland. He is a senior lecturer at the University of Aberdeen. The current staff directory page of the university website gives his designation as "Honorary Research Fellow, DHP School Administration". The "DHP" is the School of Divinity, History and Philosophy at the university.

== Publications ==
- These Fissured Isles: Ireland, Scotland and British History, 1798-1848. Eds., Terry Brotherstone, Anna Clark and Kevin Whelan. John Donald, Edinburgh. 2005. Pp. 256. Illus. ISBN 978-1-904607-50-2.
- Freedom and Authority: historical and historiographical essays. East Linton: Tuckwell, 2000. [co-edited with David Ditchburn, Aberdeen]
- Gendering Scottish History: an international approach. Glasgow: Cruithne Press, 1999 [co-edited with Deborah Simonton and Oonagh Walsh, Aberdeen]
- History, Economic History and the Future of Marxism. London: Porcupine Press, 1996 [co-edited with Geoff Pilling, Middlesex]
- The City and its Worlds: Aberdeen's history since 1792. Glasgow: Cruithne Press, 1996 [co-edited with Don Withrington, Aberdeen]
- The Trotsky Reappraisal. Edinburgh: EUP, 1992 [co-edited with Paul Dukes, Aberdeen]
- Covenant, Charter and Party: traditions of revolt and protest in modern Scottish history. Aberdeen: AUP, 1989 [editor]
