= Anthony Tuck =

British historian

Anthony Tuck (born 14 November 1940) is Emeritus Professor of Medieval History at the University of Bristol. He was educated at the Royal Grammar School, Newcastle upon Tyne (1948–59) and at Jesus College, Cambridge, where he received his BA and PhD degrees. From 1965 to 1978 he was Senior Lecturer in Medieval History at Lancaster University. He was then appointed Master of Collingwood College at the University of Durham, remaining in that role until 1985. His published work focuses on the relationship between the king and nobility in late medieval England. His younger brother is the historian Richard Tuck.

== Select publications ==
- Tuck, A. (1973), Richard II and the English Nobility, London: Edward Arnold, ISBN 0-7131-5708-9
- Tuck, A. (1985), Crown and Nobility 1272-1461: Political Conflict in Late Medieval England, London: Fontana, ISBN 0-00-686084-2
- Tuck, A.; Goodman, A., eds. (1992), War and Border Societies in the Middle Ages, London: Routledge, ISBN 0-415-08021-5
