= Alastair Macdonald (historian) =

Scottish historian

Dr Alastair Macdonald is a Scottish historian. He is the Mackie Lecturer in History at the University of Aberdeen.

His field of research is Scotland-England relations during the late medieval period (1369-1403), particularly the development of "Frontier societies" and Scotland's place in the wider world during this period. His current research is "to examine the nature and impact of war on state and society in later medieval Scotland".

He is also a cricketer who has played as a fast bowling all rounder playing mainly for Aberdeen Grammar School FPs. He recorded a hat trick in a match against Inverurie and has contributed with both bat and ball throughout his career. Despite being affected by injury in recent seasons, MacDonald has still continued to score on runs in the lower leagues competitions.

== Selected publications ==
- Border Bloodshed: Scotland and England at War, 1369–1403 (Tuckwell Press, 2000)
- "Approaches to Conflict in the Late Fourteenth-Century Anglo-Scottish Borders", in Ships, Guns and Bibles in the North Sea and Baltic States (2000)
- Medieval Scotland 1100-1560, R. A. Houston & W. J. Knox (eds), The New Penguin History of Scotland. London: Penguin, 2001 (with co-editor David Ditchburn)
- "Courage, Fear and the Experience of the Later Medieval Scottish Soldier", Scottish Historical Review (2013)
- "Trickery, Mockery and the Scottish Way of War", Proceedings of the Society of Antiquaries of Scotland (2014)
- "Good King Robert's Testament? Guerrilla Warfare in Later Medieval Scotland", in Unconventional Warfare from Antiquity to the Present Day (2017)
- "Two Kinds of War? Brutality and Atrocity in Later Medieval Scotland", in Killing and Being Killed (2017)
- "Henry V and the Scots: A Study in Failure", in Kingship, Lordship and Sanctity in Medieval Britain (2022)
