= Nigel Saul =

British scholar and historian

Nigel Saul (born 1952) is a British academic who was formerly the Head of the Department of History at Royal Holloway, University of London (RHUL). He retired in 2015 and is now emeritus professor. He is recognised as one of the leading experts in the history of medieval England.

Saul has written numerous books including Knights and Esquires. The Gloucestershire Gentry in the Fourteenth Century (1981), and The Oxford Illustrated History of Medieval England (1997). His major biography Richard II (1997) was the product of ten years' work and was acclaimed by P. D. James as "unlikely to be surpassed in scholarship, comprehensiveness, or in the biographer's insight into his subject's character". In 2011, he published a comprehensive survey of English chivalry, For Honour and Fame. Chivalry in England, 1066–1500 (2011). More recently, he has written on the history of church monuments. His English Church Monuments in the Middle Ages: History and Representation (2009) earned wide praise as a successful attempt to tackle the subject from a historical perspective. He is a Fellow of the Society of Antiquaries of London and served as President of the Monumental Brass Society between 1995 and 2002.

Saul served as Honorary President of Royal Holloway's Conservative Future Society.

== Selected publications ==
- Knights and Esquires. The Gloucestershire Gentry in the Fourteenth Century (Oxford, 1981)
- Scenes From Provincial Life. Knightly Families in Sussex 1280–1400 (Oxford, 1986)
- "Richard II and the Vocabulary of Kingship", English Historical Review, 110 (1995)
- Richard II (New Haven and London, 1997); (pbk., 1999)
- Death, Art and Memory in Medieval England. The Cobham Family and their Monuments 1300–1500 (Oxford, 2001)
- The Three Richards (Hambledon and London, 2005)
- English Church Monuments in the Middle Ages. History and Representation (Oxford, 2009)
- For Honour and Fame: Chivalry in England 1066–1500 (London, 2011)
- Lordship and Faith: the English Gentry and the Parish Church in the Middle Ages (Oxford, 2017)
- Decorated in Glory. Church Building in Herefordshire in the Fourteenth Century (Logaston, 2020)
