= Anthony Goodman (historian) =

Anthony Eric Goodman (1936–2016) was an English professor emeritus of medieval and renaissance studies at the University of Edinburgh. His main field of interest was late medieval England, and he published books on subjects such as John of Gaunt and the Wars of the Roses.

He died on 3 October 2016.

== Select publications ==
- The Loyal Conspiracy: The Lords Appellant under Richard II (London: Routledge, 1971), ISBN 0-7100-7074-8.
- A History of England from Edward II to James I (London : Longman, 1977), ISBN 0-582-48282-8.
- The Wars of the Roses: Military Activity and English Society, 1452-97 (London: Routledge, 1981), ISBN 0-7100-0728-0.
- John of Gaunt: The Exercise of Princely Power in Fourteenth-Century Europe (Harlow: Longman, 1992), ISBN 0-582-50218-7.
- Katherine Swynford (Lincoln: Honywood, 1994), ISBN 1-870561-07-4.
- The Wars of the Roses: The Soldiers' Experience (Tempus, 2005) ISBN 0-7524-1784-3
- Joan, the Fair Maid of Kent, A Fourteenth Century Princess and her World, (The Boydell Press, 2017), ISBN 978-1-78327-176-4.
