= Holland family =

Medieval English noble family

Arms of Holland: Azure semée-de-lys argent, a lion rampant of the second

The Holland family was a medieval-era English noble family. Many Hollands were Dukes, Earls, Knights and Barons in medieval England, and they played significant roles in the struggles for the crown in the fourteenth and fifteenth century.

== Origin and ennoblement ==
The first recorded Holland was Matthew de Holland of Upholland, possibly the son of Siward 'the Warrior' de Longworth and grandson of Ulfe de Longworth, however this is no more than oft-repeated conjecture, as there are no credible Y-DNA genealogies tracing further back than Matthew at this time. What is historically certain, however, is that Matthew's great-grandson was a knight named Sir Robert de Holland of Upholland. Robert had a son, another Robert, born around 1283, who became a favourite knight of Thomas, 2nd Earl of Lancaster. After fighting for Thomas in the Banastre Rebellion, a civil war started by rival barons, he acquired large plots of land and was created Baron Holand in 1314. He fought with Lancaster against king Edward II of England at the Battle of Boroughbridge in 1322 and after briefly being imprisoned twice and escaping, he continued in rebellion until Queen Isabella's Invasion of England. In 1328 Henry, 3rd Earl of Lancaster's followers declared Robert a traitor over the events of the Banastre Rebellion more than a decade earlier, and he was taken prisoner and beheaded. Robert's eldest son, Robert, would succeed him as 2nd Baron Holand, and whose 1373 death, after that of his son Robert, his heir was his granddaughter Maud, wife of John Lovel, 5th Baron Lovel. It was the younger sons of the 1st Baron, Thomas Holland and Sir Otho Holland, who gained prominence.

== Founding of the Order of the Garter ==
Arms of the Holland Earls of Kent, inherited from the earlier Earls of the royal family, the Royal arms of England with a silver border

Sir Thomas Holland and his brother, Sir Otho Holland, fought side by side in the Hundred Years' War, against the French. They were both daring commanders of the English army, and both saw intense action at the battles of Caen and Crécy. The brothers later left duty in France and returned home to England, where they became two of the founding knights of the Order of the Garter, which remains England's highest order of chivalry. Thomas married Joan of Kent, daughter of Edmund of Woodstock, 1st Earl of Kent, and granddaughter of king Edward I. Thomas was summoned to Parliament in 1354, thus becoming Baron Holland, of a second creation distinct from that held by his father. Otho died childless in 1359, and Thomas died the next year, but not before being made Earl of Kent in right of his wife, who was Countess of Kent in her own right. Thomas and Joan had two sons who were prominent members of the nobility. Their eldest son, Thomas, inherited the earldom, while John first became Earl of Huntingdon and then Duke of Exeter.

== Elevation and fall ==
Thomas inherited his father's title of Earl of Kent, becoming the 2nd Earl of Kent, and like his predecessors, Thomas was a keen warrior. When he grew up, he fought in many battles, most notably the Battle of Nájera, in which he served under his stepfather, Edward, the Black Prince. He became influential in the court of his half-brother, Richard II of England, and like his father became a Knight of the Garter in 1375, dying in 1397. His eldest son Thomas Holland, 3rd Earl of Kent would be created Duke of Surrey months after succeeding his father as reward for his support of Richard II, but with that king's downfall in 1399 he was forced to forfeit the Dukedom. He would join his uncle John and other supporters of Richard in the Epiphany Rising, and was captured and executed in January 1400. He was succeeded by his brother Edmund Holland, 4th Earl of Kent, who became Knight of the Garter in 1403 and was killed fighting for Henry IV at Île-de-Bréhat in 1408, without legitimate issue, his heirs being several sisters married into the highest ranks of the English nobility, including both the Lancastrian and York houses that would contest the War of the Roses.

Arms of John Holland, 1st Duke of Exeter

Arms of the later Holland Dukes of Exeter

John Holland, second son of the 1st Earl of Kent also became a Knight of the Garter, in 1383. He was deprived of his lands in 1385 over his murder of the son of the Earl of Stafford, but was restored the next year and married to a cousin of the king, Elizabeth, daughter of John of Gaunt, Duke of Lancaster, under whom he would fight in Spain. He was made Earl of Huntingdon in 1388, and as close supporter of his half-brother King Richard, was made Duke of Exeter in 1397. He was stripped of the title in 1399 by his brother-in-law Henry IV of England, and after his participation in the Epiphany Rising was attainted and executed. His eldest surviving son John would be restored to his father's lands and earldom and made Knight of the Garter in 1416 after distinguishing himself at the Battle of Agincourt, and he continued to support the Lancastrian kings, being member of the Privy Council from 1423. The Dukedom of Exeter was returned to the family in 1444 with an elevated precedence falling only behind that of the Duchy of York, and he died in 1447.

His son Henry Holland, 3rd Duke of Exeter would succeed, and though he married the daughter of Richard, Duke of York, he remained a staunch Lancastrian in the War of the Roses. He was a commander in the Lancastrian victories at Wakefield (1460) and St Albans (1461), before being defeated at Towton and attainted while in exile, and his properties awarded to his wife, the sister of Edward IV, who had separated from Holland. With the Readeption of Henry VI in 1470, Holland was restored to his lands but was again defeated at Barnet, deprived and divorced. He drowned under mysterious circumstances in 1475, his only child having predeceased him.

== Titled members of the Holland family ==
=== Barons Holland, created 1314, in abeyance 1372/3 ===
- Robert de Holland, 1st Baron Holand, 1314–1328
- Robert de Holland, 2nd Baron Holand, 1328–1373
- Maud de Holland, 3rd Baroness Holand, 1373

=== Barons Holand (new creation), created 1354, extinct 1408 ===
- Thomas Holland, 1st Baron Holand, 1354–1360, also 1st Earl of Kent
- Thomas Holland, 2nd Baron Holand, 1350–1397, also 2nd Earl of Kent
- Thomas Holland, 3rd Baron Holand, 1372 – 1400, also 1st Duke of Surrey & 3rd Earl of Kent
- Edmund Holland, 4th Baron Holand, 1400–1408, also 4th Earl of Kent

=== Earls of Kent, created 1360, extinct 1408 ===
- Thomas Holland, 1st Earl of Kent, 1360, also 1st Baron Holand (1354 creation)
- Thomas Holland, 2nd Earl of Kent, 1360–1397, also 2nd Baron Holand (1354 creation)
- Thomas Holland, 3rd Earl of Kent, 1372 – 1400, also 1st Duke of Surrey & 3rd Baron Holand (1354 creation)
- Edmund Holland, 4th Earl of Kent, 1400–1408, also 4th Baron Holand (1354 creation)

=== Duke of Surrey, created 1397, forfeited 1399 ===
- Thomas Holland, 1st Duke of Surrey, 1397–1399, also 3rd Earl of Kent & 3rd Baron Holand (1354 creation)

=== Earl of Huntingdon, created 1388, forfeited 1400, restored 1416, forfeited 1461 ===
- John Holland, 1st Earl of Huntingdon, 1388–1400, also 1st Duke of Exeter
- John Holland, 2nd Earl of Huntingdon, 1416–1447, also 2nd Duke of Exeter
- Henry Holland, 3rd Earl of Huntingdon, 1447–1461, also 3rd Duke of Exeter

=== Duke of Exeter, created 1397, forfeited 1399, restored 1444, forfeited 1461 ===
- John Holland, 1st Duke of Exeter, 1397–1399, also 1st Earl of Huntingdon
- John Holland, 2nd Duke of Exeter, 1444–1447, also 2nd Earl of Huntingdon
- Henry Holland, 3rd Duke of Exeter, 1447–1461, 3rd Earl of Huntingdon
