= Armorial of the House of Plantagenet =

List of heraldry from an English dynasty

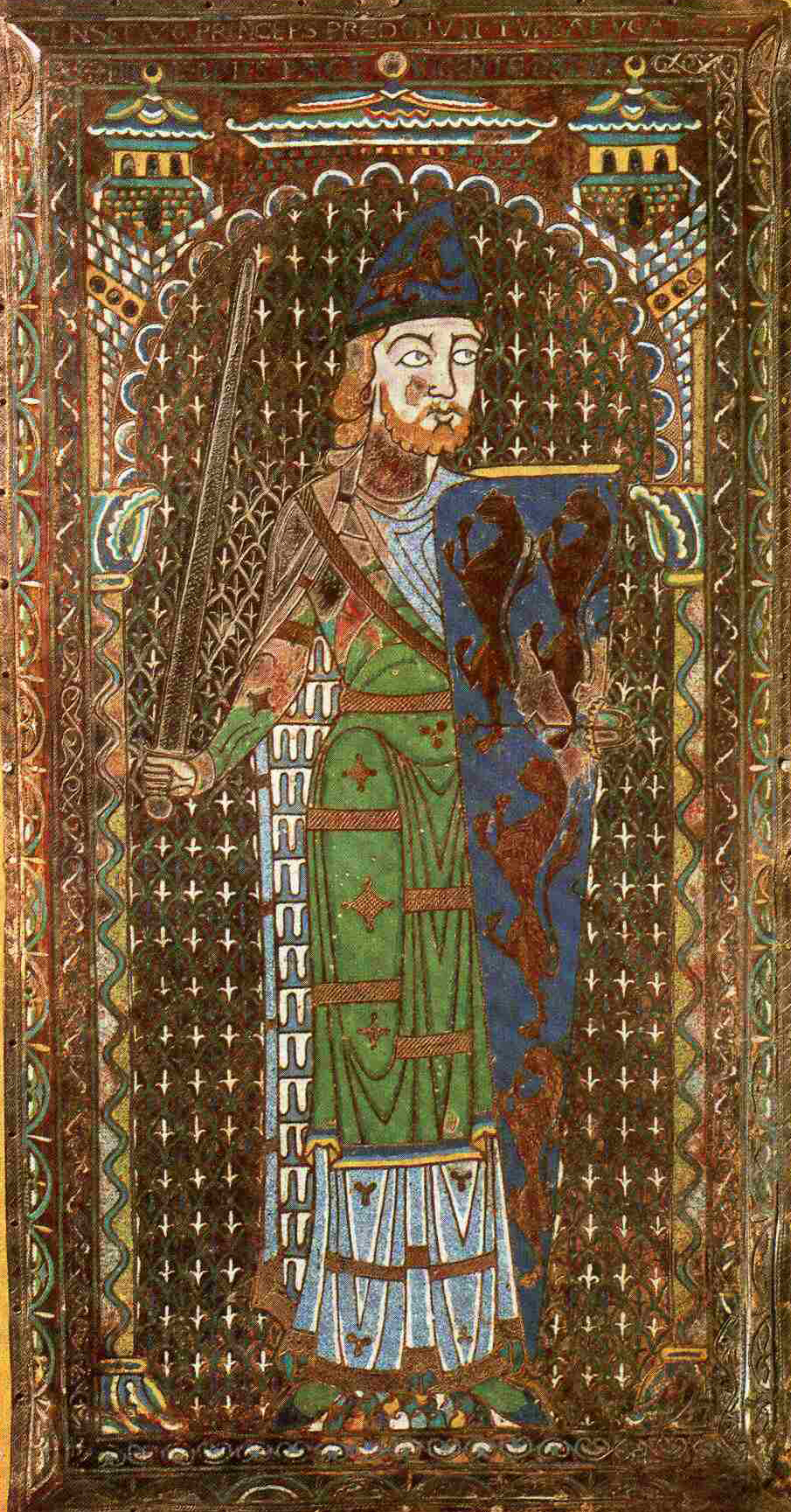
Enamel portrait of Geoffrey Plantagenet, Count of Anjou (1113/17–1151), formerly on his tomb in Le Mans Cathedral, Anjou, France, now in the Museum of Archeology and History in Le Mans. Visible on half his shield of azure are four lions rampant or, arranged in a manner reminiscent of the full-shield of six lions rampant (3,2,1) borne by his grandson William Longespée, 3rd Earl of Salisbury

The House of Plantagenet was the first truly armigerous royal dynasty of England. Their predecessor, Henry I of England, had presented items decorated with a lion heraldic emblem to his son-in-law, Plantagenet founder Geoffrey, Count of Anjou, and his family experimented with different lion-bearing coats until these coalesced during the reign of his grandson, Richard I (1189–1199), into a coat of arms with three lions on a red field, formally Gules, three lions passant guardant or (armed and langued azure), that became the Royal Arms of England, and colloquially those of England itself. The various cadet branches descended from this family bore differenced versions of these arms, while later members of the House of Plantagenet would either quarter or impale these arms with others to reflect their political aspirations.

== Overview of Plantagenet arms ==
=== Before Edward III ===
Arms of dynastic founder and kings
Geoffrey Plantagenet, Count of Anjou; William Longespée, 3rd Earl of Salisbury, illegitimate son of King Henry II	Henry II of England (possible); William FitzEmpress (possible); Richard I of England (1189–1198) (likely)	Henry II of England (possible); John, prior to becoming king Richard FitzRoy, John's illegitimate son	Kings of England; 1198–1340, 1360–1369

Arms of the sons of kings and their issue
Prince of Wales	Richard, 1st Earl of Cornwall, son of King John	Edmund Crouchback, 1st Earl of Lancaster, son of Henry III	Henry, 3rd Earl of Lancaster, son of Edmund Crouchback (1322–1326) (later inherited his father's arms)
Thomas of Brotherton, 1st Earl of Norfolk, son of Edward I	Edmund of Woodstock, 1st Earl of Kent, son of Edward I	John of Eltham, Earl of Cornwall, son of Edward II	

=== After Edward III ===
Arms of Kings
Kings of England; 1340–1360, 1369–1395, 1399–1406	Richard II of England, 1395–1399	Kings of England; 1406–1422, 1461–1470, 1471–1485	Henry VI of England, 1422–1461, 1470–1471

Arms of the sons of Edward III
Edward, the Black Prince	Lionel of Antwerp, 1st Duke of Clarence	John of Gaunt, 1st Duke of Lancaster	Edmund of Langley, 1st Duke of York	Thomas of Woodstock, 1st Duke of Gloucester

Arms of the grandsons of Edward III
	Sons of John of Gaunt: House of Lancaster Sons of Edmund of Langley: House of York	
Richard of Bordeaux, son of the Black Prince, until 1376	Sons of John of Gaunt: House of Lancaster Sons of Edmund of Langley: House of York	Humphrey, 2nd Earl of Buckingham, son of Thomas, Duke of Gloucester

==== House of Lancaster ====
Arms of John of Gaunt, 1st Duke of Lancaster		Arms of Henry of Bolingbroke, eldest son of John of Gaunt	
As Duke of Lancaster	As claimant King of Castile (1371)	As Duke of Hereford	As Duke of Hereford and Lancaster

House of Henry IV
Princes of Wales	Thomas of Lancaster, 1st Duke of Clarence	John of Lancaster, 1st Duke of Bedford	Humphrey, Duke of Gloucester

Arms of the House of Beaufort, legitimized sons of John of Gaunt
John Beaufort, 1st Earl of Somerset			Thomas Beaufort, Duke of Exeter	
Before 1396	After legitimation, 1396	France moderne adopted	After legitimation, 1396	France moderne adopted

==== House of York ====
Arms of the sons of Edmund of Langley
Edward of Norwich, as Earl of Rutland	Edward of Norwich, as Duke of York	Duke of York since the adoption of France moderne	Richard of Conisburgh, 3rd Earl of Cambridge

Arms of the sons of Richard, 3rd Duke of York
Edward, Earl of March	Edmund, Earl of Rutland	George, Duke of Clarence	Richard, Duke of Gloucester

Arms of the grandsons of Richard, 3rd Duke of York
Edward, Prince of Wales, son of Edward IV	Richard of Shrewsbury, Duke of York, son of Edward IV	Edward Plantagenet, 17th Earl of Warwick, son of George, Duke of Clarence	Edward of Middleham, Prince of Wales, son of Richard III

=== Non-Plantagenet families ===
The heiresses of Norfolk and Kent transmitted the Plantagenet arms to non-Plantagenet families:

Mowbrays and Hollands
Mowbray Dukes of Norfolk	Holland Earls of Kent	John Holland, 1st Duke of Exeter	John Holland, 2nd Duke of Exeter

Henry VI of England granted differenced versions of the Plantagenet arms to his maternal half-brothers. This was an extraordinary grant, since they were not descended from the English royal family.

House of Tudor
Edmund Tudor, 1st Earl of Richmond	Jasper Tudor, Duke of Bedford

== House of Plantagenet ==
Colour key
(Line of descent)
Monarchs
Paternal descent
Maternal descent
Consorts
Illegitimate descent
Collaterals

=== Descendants of Geoffrey Plantagenet, Count of Anjou ===
Arms

Name
Geoffrey of Anjou
Life
1113–1151
Blazon
Azure, six lions rampant Or, three, two and one
Notes
Son of: Fulk, King of Jerusalem and Ermengarde, Countess of Maine.

Married to: Empress Matilda; 1128–1151.

Progenitor of the Plantagenet dynasty.

Arms	Name	Life	Blazon	Notes
	King Henry II	1133–1189	Possible: Gules, a lion rampant (? contourné) Possible: Gules, two lions passant	Son of: Geoffrey of Anjou and Empress Matilda. No contemporary account provides him with arms, though attempts have been made to extrapolate what he may have used based on those of his sons and other kin. In French blazoning, the lion passant guardant was often termed a léopard. However, this usage was never widespread in England, and is long obsolete.
	Queen Eleanor	1124?–1204	Attributed:Gules, a lion passant guardant in pale Or	Daughter of: William X, Duke of Aquitaine, Duke of Aquitaine and Aenor de Châtellerault. Married to: King Henry II; 1152–1189. There is not surviving contemporary evidence of her using arms, but later historians would attribute these arms to her.

Arms	Name	Life	Blazon	Notes
	William FitzEmpress "Longespee"	1136-1164	Possible: Lion rampant (? contourné)	Son of: Geoffrey of Anjou and Empress Matilda.

Arms	Name	Life	Blazon	Notes
	King Richard I, "The Lionheart"	1157–1199	Possible: Lion rampant (? contourné) Possible: Two lions combatant Possible: Two lions passant Gules, three lions passant guardant Or	Son of: King Henry II and Queen Eleanor. His arms are only known from two armorial seals, and hence the tinctures can not be determined. His First Great Seal showed one lion on half of the shield. It is debated whether this was meant to represent two lions combatant or a single lion, and if the latter, whether the direction in which the lion is facing is relevant or simply an artistic liberty. A simple lion rampant is most likely. At the end of his life, his second seal showed three lions, clearly the three-lion coat used by his successors.
	Queen Berengaria	1170?–1230	Azure, a cross pomettée Argent	Daughter of: Sancho VI of Navarre and Sancha of Castile, Queen of Navarre. Married to: King Richard I; 1191–1199.

Arms

Name
William Longespée, 3rd Earl of Salisbury
Life
1176–1226
Blazon
Azure, six lions guardant Or, three, two and one
Notes
Illegitimate son of: King Henry II and Ida de Tosny.

=== Descendants of John, King of England ===
Arms	Name	Life	Blazon	Notes
	King John "Lackland"	1166–1216	Gules, three lions passant guardant Or	Son of: King Henry II and Queen Eleanor.
	Queen Isabella	1188–1246	Lozengy, Or and Gules (Angoulême)	Daughter of: Aymer of Angoulême and Alice of Courtenay. Married to: King John; 1200–1216.

Arms

Name
Richard, 1st Earl of Cornwall
Life
1209–1272
Blazon
Argent, a red lion rampant Gules crowned Or, within a bordure Sable bezanty
Notes
Son of: King John and Queen Isabella.

=== Descendants of Henry III of England ===
Arms	Name	Life	Blazon	Notes
	King Henry III	1207–1272	Gules, three lions passant guardant Or	Son of: King John and Queen Isabella.
	Queen Eleanor	1223–1291	Or, four pallets Gules	Daughter of: Ramon Berenguer IV, Count of Provence and Beatrice of Savoy Married to: King Henry III; 1236–1272.

Arms	Name	Life	Blazon	Notes
	Edmund Crouchback, Earl of Leicester and Lancaster	1245–1296	Gules, three lions passant guardant Or, with a label of three points Azure each charged with three fleurs de lys Or	Son of: King Henry III and Queen Eleanor.
	Thomas, 2nd Earl of Lancaster	1278–1322	Gules, three lions passant guardant Or, with a label of three points Azure each charged with three fleurs de lys Or	Son of: Edmund Crouchback, Earl of Leicester and Lancaster and Blanche of Artois.
	Henry, 3rd Earl of Lancaster	1281–1345	Gules, three lions passant guardant Or, a baston Azure	Son of: Edmund Crouchback, Earl of Leicester and Lancaster and Blanche of Artois.
	Henry of Grosmont, 1st Duke of Lancaster	1310–1361	Gules, three lions passant guardant Or, with a label of three points Azure each charged with three fleurs de lys Or	Son of: Henry, 3rd Earl of Lancaster and Maud Chaworth

=== Descendants of Edward I of England ===
Arms	Name	Life	Blazon	Notes
	King Edward I	1239–1307	Gules, three lions passant guardant Or	Son of: King Henry III and Queen Eleanor.
	Queen Eleanor	1241–1290	Quarterly, 1st and 4th, Gules a castle Or (Castile), 2nd and 3rd, Argent a lion rampant (Leon)	Daughter of: King Ferdinand III of Castile and Joan of Ponthieu. Married to: King Edward I; 1254–1290
	Queen Margaret	1279–1318	Gules, three lions passant guardant Or (England), dimidiating, Azure, semée fleurs de lys Or (France)	Daughter of: King Philip III of France and Marie of Brabant. Married to: King Edward I; 1299–1307

Arms	Name	Life	Blazon	Notes
	Alphonso Plantagenet, Earl of Chester	1273–1284	Gules, three lions passant guardant in pale Or, with a label of five points Azure	Son of: King Edward I and Queen Eleanor.
	Edward of Caernarfon, Prince of Wales (later King Edward II)	1284–1327	Gules, three lions passant guardant in pale Or, with a label of three points Azure	Son of: King Edward I and Queen Eleanor.
	Thomas of Brotherton, Earl of Norfolk	1300–1338	Gules, three lions passant guardant in pale Or, with a label of three points Argent	Son of: King Edward I and Queen Margaret.
	Alice de Hales (or Halys)	1304–1326	Barry of ten Argent and Azure, a canton Gules, a lion passant guardant Or	Daughter of: Roger Hales (or Halys) Married to: Thomas of Brotherton, Earl of Norfolk; (1316?–1320?)–1326
	Edmund of Woodstock, Earl of Kent	1301–1330	Gules, three lions passant guardant in pale Or, within a bordure Argent (Kent)	Son of: King Edward I and Queen Margaret.
	Margaret Wake, Baroness Wake of Liddell	1297?–1349	Barry of six Or and Gules, in chief three torteaux	Daughter of: John Wake, Baron Wake of Liddell and Joan de Fiennes Married to: Edmund of Woodstock, Earl of Kent; 1325
	Joan of Kent	1328–1385	Gules, three lions passant guardant Or, within a bordure Argent (Kent)	Daughter of: Edmund, Earl of Kent and Margaret Wake. Married to: Thomas Holland, Earl of Kent; 1340–1360 Married to: Edward of Woodstock, Prince of Wales; 1361–1376. The so-called Fair Maid of Kent.
	Thomas Holland, Earl of Kent	1350?–1397	Gules, three lions passant guardant in pale Or, within a bordure Argent (Kent)	Son of: Thomas Holland, Earl of Kent and Joan of Kent
	John Holland, Duke of Exeter	1352–1400	Gules, three lions passant guardant in pale Or, within a bordure Argent charged with fleurs de lys Or	Son of: Thomas Holland, Earl of Kent and Joan of Kent
	John Holland, Duke of Exeter and Earl of Huntingdon	1395–1447	Gules, three lions passant guardant in pale Or, within a bordure Azure charged with eight fleurs de lys Or	Son of: John Holland, Duke of Exeter and Earl of Huntingdon and Elizabeth of Lancaster

=== Descendants of Edward II of England ===
Arms	Name	Life	Blazon	Notes
	King Edward II	1284–1327	Gules, three lions passant guardant Or	Son of: King of Edward I and Queen Eleanor.
	Queen Isabella	1295–1358	Gules, three lions passant guardant Or (England), dimidiating, Azure, semée fleurs de lys Or (France) Quarterly, 1st England, 2nd France ancien, 3rd, Gules, a cross saltire and an orle of chains linked together Or (Navarre), 4th, Azure, a bend Argent cotised potent-counter-potent Or (Champagne)	Daughter of: King Philip IV of France and Joan I of Navarre. Married to: King of Edward II; 1308–1327

Arms	Name	Life	Blazon	Notes
	Edward of Windsor, Prince of Wales (later King Edward III)	1312–1377	Gules, three lions passant guardant Or, with a label of three points Azure	Son of: King Edward II and Queen Isabella.
	John of Eltham, Earl of Cornwall	1316–1336	Gules, three lions passant guardant Or, within a bordure of France	Son of: King Edward II and Queen Isabella.

=== Descendants of Edward III of England ===
Arms	Name	Life	Blazon	Notes
	King Edward III	1312–1377	Previously Edward bore: Gules, three lions passant guardant Or. Quarterly, 1st and 4th, Azure, semée of fleurs de lys Or (France), 2nd and 3rd, Gules, three lions passant guardant Or (England)	Son of: King Edward II and Queen Isabella. In 1340, Edward III claimed the throne of France as an inheritance from his mother, Isabella, daughter of King Philip IV of France, and adopted new arms, Quarterly France and England. Such arms are termed "Arms of Pretension", where a sovereign adopts arms illustrative of a claim de jure (by right) to the throne of another kingdom.
	Queen Philippa	1314–1369	Quarterly, 1st and 4th, England; 2nd and 3rd, Or, four lions rampant in a quadrangle the first and fourth Sable (Flanders), the second and third Gules (Holland)	Daughter of: William I, Count of Hainaut and Joan of Valois. Married to: King Edward III; 1328–1369.

==== Descendants of Edward, the Black Prince ====
Arms	Name	Life	Blazon	Notes
	Edward of Woodstock, Prince of Wales	1330–1376	Quarterly, 1st and 4th, France ancien, 2nd and 3rd England, with a label of three points Argent	Son of: King Edward III and Queen Philippa.
	Joan of Kent	1328–1385	Gules, three lions passant guardant Or, within a bordure Argent (Kent)	Daughter of: Edmund, Earl of Kent and Margaret Wake. Married to: Thomas Holland, Earl of Kent; 1340–1360 Married to: Edward of Woodstock, Prince of Wales; 1361–1376.

Arms

Name
Sir Roger Clarendon
Life
1350–1402
Blazon
Or, on a bend Sable, three ostrich feathers Argent, the quills transfixing as many scrolls of the first
Notes
Illegitimate son of: Edward of Woodstock, the Prince of Wales and Edith Willesford.

Arms	Name	Life	Blazon	Notes
	King Richard II	1367–1400	Azure, a cross fleury between five martlets Or (St. Edward the Confessor), impaling, Quarterly, 1st and 4th, France ancien, 2nd and 3rd England	Son of: Edward of Woodstock, the Prince of Wales and Joan of Kent. Childless, overthrown and succeeded by his cousin, Henry Bolingbroke or King Henry IV.
	Anne of Bohemia	1366–1394	Quarterly, 1st and 4th, Or, an eagle displayed sable (Imperial Arms), 2nd and 3rd, Gules, a lion rampant queue fourchée Argent crowned Or (Bohemia)	Daughter of: Emperor Charles IV of the Holy Roman Empire and Elizabeth of Pomerania. Married to: King Richard II; 1382–1394.
	Isabella of Valois	1389–1409	Azure, semée of fleurs de lys Or (France ancien)	Daughter of: King Charles VI of France and Isabeau of Bavaria. Married to: King Richard II; 1396–1400.

==== Descendants of Lionel of Antwerp, 1st Duke of Clarence ====
Arms	Name	Life	Blazon	Notes
	Lionel of Antwerp, Duke of Clarence	1338–1368	Quarterly, 1st and 4th, France ancien, 2nd and 3rd England, with a label of three points Argent each charged with a canton Gules	Son of: King Edward III and Queen Philippa.
	Elizabeth de Burgh, Countess of Ulster	1332–1363	Or, a cross Gules (de Burgh)	Daughter of: William Donn de Burgh, Earl of Ulster and Matilda of Lancaster. Married to: Lionel of Antwerp, Duke of Clarence; 1352–1363.

Arms	Name	Life	Blazon	Notes
	Philippa of Clarence, Countess of Ulster	1355–1382	Quarterly, 1st and 4th, France ancien, 2nd and 3rd England, with a label of three points Argent each charged with a canton Gules, impaling, Barry of six, Or and Azure, on a chief two pales, the corners gyronny, overall an escutcheon Argent	Daughter of: Lionel of Antwerp, Duke of Clarence and Elizabeth de Burgh, Countess of Ulster. Married to: Edmund Mortimer, Earl of March; 1368–1381.
	Edmund Mortimer, Earl of March	1352–1381	Barry of six, Or and Azure, on a chief two pales, the corners gyronny, overall an escutcheon Argent (Mortimer)	Son of: Roger Mortimer, Earl of March and Philippa Montacute.
	Roger Mortimer, Earl of March	1374–1398	Quarterly, 1st and 4th, Barry of six, Or and Azure, on a chief two pales, the corners gyronny, overall an escutcheon Argent (Mortimer), 2nd and 3rd Or, a cross Gules (de Burgh)	Son of: Edmund Mortimer, Earl of March and Philippa of Clarence, Countess of Ulster.
	Alianore Holland, Countess of March	1370–1405	Gules, three lions passant guardant Or, within a bordure Argent (Kent)	Daughter of: Thomas Holland, Earl of Kent and Alice Holland. Married to: Roger Mortimer, Earl of March; 1388–1398.
	Anne Mortimer, Countess of Cambridge	1390–1411	Quarterly, 1st and 4th, France moderne, 2nd and 3rd England, with a label of three points Argent each point charged with three torteaux Gules, within a bordure Argent charged with lions rampant purpure, impaling, Quarterly, 1st and 4th, Barry of six, Or and Azure, on a chief two pales, the corners gyronny, overall an escutcheon Argent (Mortimer), 2nd and 3rd Or, a cross Gules (de Burgh)	Daughter of: Roger Mortimer, Earl of March and Alianore Holland, Countess of March. Married to: Richard of Conisburgh, Earl of Cambridge; 1408–1411.

==== John of Gaunt, 1st Duke of Lancaster ====
Arms	Name	Life	Blazon	Notes
	John of Gaunt, Duke of Lancaster	1340–1399	Quarterly, 1st and 4th, France ancien, 2nd and 3rd England, with a label of three points ermine Quarterly, Castile and Leon, impaling, quarterly, France and England, a label of three points ermine	Son of: King Edward III and Queen Philippa. See: House of Lancaster
	Blanche of Lancaster	1345–1369	England a label of France (Old Lancaster)	Daughter of: Henry of Grosmont, Duke of Lancaster and Isabel of Beaumont. Married to: John of Gaunt, Duke of Lancaster; 1359–1369.
	Constance of Castile	1354–1394	Quarterly, Castile and Leon (Kingdom of Castile)	Daughter of: King Peter of Castile and María de Padilla. Married to: John of Gaunt, Duke of Lancaster; 1371–1394.
	Katherine Swynford	1350–1403	Gules, three Catherine wheels Or (Roet)	Daughter of: Payne de Roet. Married to: John of Gaunt, Duke of Lancaster; 1396–1399.

==== Edmund of Langley, 1st Duke of York ====
Arms	Name	Life	Blazon	Notes
	Edmund of Langley, Duke of York	1341–1402	Quarterly, 1st and 4th, France ancien, 2nd and 3rd England, with a label of three points Argent each point charged with three torteaux Gules	Son of: King Edward III and Queen Philippa. See: House of York
	Isabella of Castille	1355–1392	Quarterly, Castille and Leon (Kingdom of Castille)	Daughter of: King Peter of Castile and María de Padilla. Married to: Edmund of Langley, Duke of York; 1372–1392.
	Joan Holland	1380–1434	Gules, three lions passant guardant Or, within a bordure Argent (Kent)	Daughter of: Thomas Holland, Earl of Kent and Alice Holland. Married to: Edmund of Langley, Duke of York; 1393–1402.

==== Descendants of Thomas of Woodstock, 1st Duke of Gloucester ====
Arms	Name	Life	Blazon	Notes
	Thomas of Woodstock, Duke of Gloucester	1355–1397	Quarterly, 1st and 4th, France ancien, 2nd and 3rd England, within a bordure Argent	Son of: King Edward III and Queen Philippa.
	Eleanor de Bohun	1366–1399	Azure, a bend Argent between two cotise and six lions rampant Or (de Bohun)	Daughter of: Humphrey de Bohun, Earl of Hereford and Joan de Bohun. Married to: Thomas of Woodstock, Duke of Gloucester; 1374–1397.

Arms	Name	Life	Blazon	Notes
	Humphrey, Earl of Buckingham	1381–1399	Quarterly, 1st and 4th, France, 2nd and 3rd England, within a bordure Argent	Son of: Thomas of Woodstock, Duke of Gloucester and Eleanor de Bohun.
	Anne of Gloucester, Countess of Stafford	1383–1438	Or, a chevron Gules (Stafford), impaling, Quarterly, 1st and 4th, France moderne, 2nd and 3rd England, within a bordure Argent	Daughter of: Thomas of Woodstock, Duke of Gloucester and Eleanor de Bohun. Married to: Edmund Stafford, Earl of Stafford.

== House of Lancaster ==
Colour key
(Line of descent)
Monarchs
Paternal descent
Maternal descent
Consorts
Illegitimate descent
Collaterals

=== Descendants of John of Gaunt, 1st Duke of Lancaster ===
Arms	Name	Life	Blazon	Notes
	Henry Bolingbroke, Duke of Hereford and Lancaster (later King Henry IV)	1366–1413	As Duke of Hereford: Quarterly, 1st and 4th, France ancien, 2nd and 3rd England, with a label of five points ermine (Richmond) As Duke of Lancaster and Hereford: Quarterly, 1st and 4th, France ancien, 2nd and 3rd England, with a label of five points two of ermine (Richmond) and three Azure flory Or (Lancaster)	Son of: John of Gaunt, Duke of Lancaster and Blanche of Lancaster.
	John Beaufort, Earl of Somerset	1373–1410	Per pale, Argent and Azure, over all on a bend Gules three lions passant guardant Or with a label of three points Azure each charges with three fleur de lys Or Quarterly, 1st and 4th, France ancien, 2nd and 3rd England, within a bordure componée Argent and Azure	Illegitimate Son (legitimated in 1396) of: John of Gaunt, Duke of Lancaster and Katherine Swynford. See: House of Beaufort
	Henry Beaufort, Cardinal of St. Eusebius and Bishop of Winchester	1374–1447	Quarterly, 1st and 4th, France ancien, 2nd and 3rd England, within a bordure componée Argent and Azure	Illegitimate Son (legitimated in 1396) of: John of Gaunt, Duke of Lancaster and Katherine Swynford.
	Thomas Beaufort, Duke of Exeter	1377–1426	Quarterly, 1st and 4th, France ancien, 2nd and 3rd England, within a bordure componée Azure and Ermine	Illegitimate Son (legitimated in 1396) of: John of Gaunt, Duke of Lancaster and Katherine Swynford.

==== Descendants of Henry IV of England ====
Arms	Name	Life	Blazon	Notes
	King Henry IV	1366–1413	Quarterly, 1st and 4th, France ancien, 2nd and 3rd England Changed to France moderne in line with changes made in that kingdom: Quarterly, 1st and 4th, France moderne, 2nd and 3rd England	Son of: John of Gaunt, Duke of Lancaster and Blanche of Lancaster. In 1376, the kings of France altered the royal coat of arms, replacing the field semée fleurs de lys with three fleurs de lys, alluding to the Trinity. This new design is referred to as France Moderne, the previous one being France Ancien. From about 1400 the kings of England imitated this change. As modified, the monarchs of England continued to bear arms in this form until the crown union with Scotland in 1603. First king of the House of Lancaster.
	Mary de Bohun	1370–1394	Azure, a bend Argent between two cotise and six lions rampant Or (de Bohun)	Daughter of: Humphrey de Bohun, Earl of Hereford and Joan FitzAlan. Married to: Henry Bolingbroke (later King Henry IV); 1380–1394.
	Joan of Navarre	1370–1437	Quarterly, 1st and 4th, France ancien and a baston gobony Argent and Gules (Evreux), 2nd and 3rd, Gules, a cross, a saltire and an orle of chain linked together Or (Navarre)	Daughter of: King Charles II of Navarre and Joan of Valois. Married to: King Henry IV; 1399–1413.

Arms	Name	Life	Blazon	Notes
	Henry of Monmouth, Prince of Wales (later King Henry V)	1386–1422	Quarterly, 1st and 4th, France moderne, 2nd and 3rd England, with a label of three points Argent	Son of: King Henry IV and Mary de Bohun.
	Thomas of Lancaster, Duke of Clarence	1387–1421	Quarterly, 1st and 4th, France moderne, 2nd and 3rd England, with a label of three points ermine, each with a canton Gules	Son of: King Henry IV and Mary de Bohun.
	John of Lancaster, Duke of Bedford	1389–1435	Quarterly, 1st and 4th, France moderne, 2nd and 3rd England, with a label of five points, the two on the dexter side ermine and each of the other three charged with three fleurs de lys	Son of: King Henry IV and Mary de Bohun.
	Humphrey of Lancaster, Duke of Gloucester	1390–1447	Quarterly, 1st and 4th, France moderne, 2nd and 3rd England, within a bordure Argent	Son of: King Henry IV and Mary de Bohun.

===== Descendants of Henry V of England =====
Arms	Name	Life	Blazon	Notes
	King Henry V	1386–1422	Quarterly, 1st and 4th, France moderne, 2nd and 3rd England	Son of: King Henry IV and Mary de Bohun.
	Catherine of Valois	1401–1437	Azure, three fleur de lys Or (France moderne)	Daughter of: King Charles VI of France and Isabeau of Bavaria. Married to: King Henry V; 1420–1422. Later married to: Owen Tudor; 1428?–1437, progenitor of the House of Tudor.

Arms	Name	Life	Blazon	Notes
	King Henry VI	1421–1471	France moderne, impaling, quarterly, 1st and 4th, France moderne, 2nd and 3rd England	Son of: King Henry V and Catherine of Valois. Throne usurped by Edward, Earl of March, who became King Edward IV in 1461.
	Margaret of Anjou	1430–1482	Quarterly of six, 1st, barry of eight Argent and Gules (Hungary), 2nd, Azure, semée of fleur de lys Or, a label of three points Gules (Naples), 3rd, Argent, a cross potent between four crosses Or (Jerusalem), 4th, Azure, semée of fleur de lys Or, a bordure Gules (Anjou), 5th Azure, semée of crosses crosslet fitchée, two barbels addorsée Or (Bar), 6th, Or, on a bend Gules three allerions Argent (Lorraine)	Daughter of: King René of Naples, Duke of Anjou and Isabella of Lorraine. Married to: King Henry VI; 1445–1471.

Arms

Name
Edward of Westminster, Prince of Wales
Life
1453–1471
Blazon
Quarterly, 1st and 4th, France moderne, 2nd and 3rd England, with a label of three points Argent
Notes
Son of: King Henry VI and Margaret of Anjou.

Killed at the Battle of Tewkesbury 1471.

== House of York ==
Colour key
(Line of descent)
Monarchs
Paternal descent
Maternal descent
Consorts
Illegitimate descent
Collaterals

=== Descendants of Edmund of Langley, 1st Duke of York ===
Arms	Name	Life	Blazon	Notes
	Edward of Norwich, Duke of York	1373–1415	Quarterly, 1st and 4th, France ancien, 2nd and 3rd England, with a label of three points Gules each charged with three castles Or Quarterly, 1st and 4th, France ancien, 2nd and 3rd England, with a label of three points Argent each point charged with three torteaux Gules	Son of: Edmund of Langley, Duke of York and Isabella of Castille.
	Richard of Conisburgh, Earl of Cambridge	1385–1415	Quarterly, 1st and 4th, France moderne, 2nd and 3rd England, with a label of three points Argent each point charged with three torteaux Gules, within a bordure Argent charged with lions rampant purpure	Son of: Edmund of Langley, Duke of York and Isabella of Castille. Executed in 1415 at the orders of King Henry V, for Treason.
	Anne Mortimer, Countess of Cambridge	1390–1411	Quarterly, 1st and 4th, France moderne, 2nd and 3rd England, with a label of three points Argent each point charged with three torteaux Gules, within a bordure Argent charged with lions rampant purpure, impaling, Quarterly, 1st and 4th, Barry of six, Or and Azure, on a chief two pales, the corners gyronny, overall an escutcheon Argent (Mortimer), 2nd and 3rd Or, a cross Gules (de Burgh)	Daughter of: Roger Mortimer, Earl of March and Alianore Holland, Countess of March. Married to: Richard of Conisburgh, Earl of Cambridge; 1408–1411. Heiress of the House of Clarence.
	Richard of York, Duke of York	1411–1460	Quarterly, 1st and 4th, quarterly, France moderne, and England, overall a label of three points each charged with three torteaux Gules, 2nd, quarterly, Castile and Leon, 3rd, quarterly, Mortimer and de Burgh, and overall and inescutcheon Gules, three passant guardant Or, a bordure Argent Quarterly, 1st and 4th, France moderne, 2nd and 3rd England, with a label of three points Argent each point charged with three torteaux Gules	Son of: Richard of Conisburgh, Earl of Cambridge, Duke of York and Anne Mortimer. Originator of the claim of the House of York to the throne, by combining the claims of Clarence (from his mother) and York (from his father).

==== Descendants of Richard of York, 3rd Duke of York ====
Arms	Name	Life	Blazon	Notes
	Richard of York, Duke of York	1411–1460	Quarterly, 1st and 4th, France modern, 2nd and 3rd England, with a label of three points Argent each point charged with three torteaux Gules	Son of: Richard of Conisburgh, Earl of Cambridge, Duke of York and Anne Mortimer. Originator of the claim of the House of York to the throne. Defeated and killed at the Battle of Wakefield in 1460.
	Cecily Neville, Duchess of York	1415–1495	Gules a saltire Argent (Neville)	Daughter of: Ralph de Neville, Earl of Westmorland and Joan Beaufort (daughter of John of Gaunt). Married to: Richard of York, Duke of York; 1429–1460.

Arms	Name	Life	Blazon	Notes
	Edward, Earl of March (later King Edward IV)	1442–1483	Quarterly, 1st, quarterly, 1st and 4th, France moderne, 2nd and 3rd England, 2nd and 3rd Or, a cross Gules (de Burgh), 4th Barry of six, Or and Azure, on a chief two pales, the corners gyronny, overall an escutcheon Argent (Mortimer)	Son of: Richard of York, Duke of York and Cecily Neville.
	Edmund, Earl of Rutland	1443–1460	Quarterly, 1st, quarterly, 1st and 4th, France moderne, 2nd and 3rd England, with a label of five points Argent the two dexter points charged with lions rampant purpure and three sinister points each with three torteaux, 2nd and 3rd de Burgh, 4th Mortimer	Son of: Richard of York, Duke of York and Cecily Neville. Killed after the Battle of Wakefield.
	George, Duke of Clarence	1449–1478	Quarterly, 1st and 4th, France moderne, 2nd and 3rd England, with a label of three points Argent each point charged with a canton Gules	Son of: Richard of York, Duke of York and Cecily Neville.
	Richard, Duke of Gloucester (later King Richard III)	1452–1485	Quarterly, 1st and 4th, France moderne, 2nd and 3rd England, with a label of three points ermine each charged with a canton Gules (same as Thomas of Lancaster)	Son of: Richard of York, Duke of York and Cecily Neville.

===== Descendants of Edward IV of England =====
Arms	Name	Life	Blazon	Notes
	King Edward IV	1442–1483	Quarterly, 1st and 4th, France moderne, 2nd and 3rd England	Son of: Richard of York, Duke of York and Cecily Neville. Declared king in 1461, usurping the crown from the weak King Henry VI. First king of the House of York.
	Elizabeth Woodville	1437–1492	Quarterly of six, 1st, Agent, a lion rampant double queued gules, crowned Or (Luxembourg), 2nd, quarterly 1st and 4th, Gules, a star of eight points Argent, 2nd and 3rd, Azure semée of fleurs de lys Or (de Baux d' Andrée), 3rd, Barry Argent and Azure, overall a lion rampant Gules (Lusignan of Cyprus), 4th, Gules, three bendlets Argent, on a chief of the first, charged with a fillet in base Or, a rose of the second (Ursins), 5th, Gules, three pallets vairy, on a chief Or a label five points Azure (St. Pol), 6th, Argent, a fess and a canton conjoined Gules (Woodville)	Daughter of: Richard Woodville, Earl Rivers and Jacquetta of Luxembourg. Married to: Sir John Grey; 1452–1461. Married to: King Edward IV; 1464–1483.

Arms	Name	Life	Blazon	Notes
	Elizabeth of York	1466–1503	Quarterly, 1st, quarterly, 1st and 4th, France moderne, 2nd and 3rd England, 2nd and 3rd de Burgh, 4th Mortimer	Daughter of: King Edward IV and Elizabeth Woodville. Married to: King Henry VII; 1486–1503.
	Edward, Prince of Wales (later King Edward V)	1470–1483?	Quarterly, 1st and 4th, France moderne, 2nd and 3rd England, with a label of three points Argent	Son of: King Edward IV and Elizabeth Woodville. One of the two: Princes in the Tower.
	Richard of Shrewsbury, Duke of York	1473–1483?	Quarterly, 1st and 4th, France moderne, 2nd and 3rd England, with a label of three points Argent on the first point a canton Gules	Son of: King Edward IV and Elizabeth Woodville. One of the two: Princes in the Tower.
	Arthur Plantagenet, Viscount Lisle	?–1542	Quarterly, 1st, quarterly, 1st and 4th, France moderne, 2nd and 3rd England, 2nd and 3rd de Burgh, 4th Mortimer, overall a baston sinister Azure Quarterly, 1st, quarterly, 1st and 4th, France moderne, 2nd and 3rd England, 2nd and 3rd de Burgh, 4th Mortimer, overall a baston sinister Azure, and over all an escutcheon of pretence quarterly of six: 1st, barry of six argent and azure, in chief three torteaux (Grey); 2nd, barry of ten argent and azure, an orle of martlets gules (Valence); 3rd, gules, seven mascles three, three, one or (Quincy); over these three quarterings a label of three points ermine; 4th, gules, a lion rampant within a bordure engrailed or (Talbot); 5th, gules, a fess between six cross croslets or (Beauchamp); 6th, gules, a lion statant guardant argent, crowned or (L'Isle).	Illegitimate son of: King Edward IV. Imprisoned in 1540 at the orders of King Henry VIII for treason. Died two days after receiving the news he was to be released.

===== Descendants of George Plantagenet, 1st Duke of Clarence =====
Arms	Name	Life	Blazon	Notes
	George, Duke of Clarence	1449–1478	Quarterly, 1st and 4th, France moderne, 2nd and 3rd England, with a label of three points Argent each point charged with a canton Gules	Son of: Richard of York, Duke of York and Cecily Neville. Executed in 1478 at the orders of King Edward IV (his own brother), for having designs on the throne.
	Isabel Neville, Duchess of Clarence	1451–1476	Gules a saltire Argent, a label of three points gobony, Argent and Azure (Neville)	Daughter of: Richard Neville, Earl of Warwick and Anne de Beauchamp. Married to: George Plantagenet, Duke of Clarence; 1469–1476.

Arms	Name	Life	Blazon	Notes
	Margaret Pole, Countess of Salisbury	1473–1541	Quarterly, 1st, Quarterly, France modern and England, a label of three points Argent each charged with a canton Gules (Clarence), 2nd, Gules a saltire Argent, a label of three points gobony Argent and Azure (Neville), impaling Gules, a fess between six crosses crosslet Or (Beauchamp), 3rd, Chequy Or and Azure, a chevron ermine (Newburgh), impaling Argent, three lozenges conjoined in fess Gules (Montacute), 4th, Or, an eagle displayed Vert (Monthermer), impaling Quarterly 1st and 4th, Or, three chevrons Gules (Clare), 2nd and 3rd, Quarterly, Argent and Gules, a fret Or, overall a bendlett Sable (Despencer)	Daughter of: George, Duke of Clarence and Isabel Neville. Married to: Sir Richard Pole; 1487–1505?. Matriarch of the Pole family; mother of Cardinal Reginald Pole, later Archbishop of Canterbury. Executed in 1541 at the orders of King Henry VIII for treason. Later beatified by the Catholic Church as Blessed.
	Edward Plantagenet, Earl of Warwick	1475–1499	Quarterly, 1st and 4th, France moderne, 2nd and 3rd England, with a label of three points gobony, Argent and Azure (Neville)	Son of: George, Duke of Clarence and Isabel Neville. Nominated heir of King Richard III in 1484. Executed in 1499 at the orders of King Henry VII for treason. Last legitimate male-line member of the House of Plantagenet.

===== Descendants of Richard III of England =====
Arms	Name	Life	Blazon	Notes
	King Richard III	1452–1485	Quarterly, 1st and 4th, France moderne, 2nd and 3rd England	Son of: Richard of York, Duke of York and Cecily Neville. Defeated and killed at the Battle of Bosworth Field in 1485, fighting against Henry Tudor, later King Henry VII. Last legitimate male-line Plantagenet king.
	Anne Neville	1456–1485	Quarterly of seven, 1st, Gules, a fess between six crosses crosslet Or (Beauchamp), 2nd, Chequy Or and Azure, a chevron ermine (Newburgh), 3rd, Argent, three lozenges conjoined in fess Gules (Montacute), 4th, Or, an eagle displayed Vert (Monthermer), 5th, Gules a saltire Argent, a label of three points gobony Argent and Azure (Neville), 6th, Or, three chevrons Gules (Clare), 7th, Quarterly, Argent and Gules, a fret Or, overall a bendlett Sable (Despencer) Gules, a saltire Argent	Daughter of: Richard Neville, Earl of Warwick and Anne de Beauchamp. Married to: Edward of Westminster, Prince of Wales; 1470–1471. Married to: King Richard III; 1472–1485. Anne sometimes bore her father, Warwick the Kingmaker's, full achievement, however at other times she also bore the arms of Neville without difference.

Arms

Name
Edward of Middleham, Prince of Wales
Life
1473–1484
Blazon
Quarterly, 1st and 4th, France moderne, 2nd and 3rd England, with a label of three points Argent
Notes
Son of: King Richard III and Anne Neville,

Died at age 10 in 1484, Edward Plantagenet, Earl of Warwick nominated heir in his place.

== House of Beaufort ==
Colour key
(Line of descent)
Monarchs
Paternal descent
Maternal descent
Consorts
Illegitimate descent
Collaterals

=== Descendants of John Beaufort, 1st Earl of Somerset ===
Arms	Name	Life	Blazon	Notes
	John Beaufort, Earl of Somerset	1373–1410	Per pale, Argent and Azure, over all on a bend Gules three lions passant guardant Or with a label of three points Azure each charges with three fleur de lys Or Quarterly, 1st and 4th, France ancien, 2nd and 3rd England, within a bordure componée Argent and Azure	Illegitimate Son (legitimated in 1396) of: John of Gaunt, Duke of Lancaster and Katherine Swynford.
	Margaret Holland, Countess of Somerset	1385–1439	Quarterly, 1st and 4th, France ancien, 2nd and 3rd England, within a bordure componée Argent and Azure, impaling, Gules, three lions passant guardant Or, within a bordure Argent	Daughter of: Thomas Holland, Earl of Kent and Alice Holland, Countess of Kent Married to: John Beaufort, Earl of Somerset; 1399–1410 Married to: Thomas of Lancaster, Duke of Clarence; 1411–1421

Arms	Name	Life	Blazon	Notes
	John Beaufort, Duke of Somerset	1403–1444	Quarterly, 1st and 4th, France moderne, 2nd and 3rd England, within a bordure componée Argent and Azure	Son of: John Beaufort, Earl of Somerset and Margaret Holland.
	Margaret Beauchamp	1406–1482	Quarterly, 1st and 4th, France moderne, 2nd and 3rd England, within a bordure componée Argent and Azure, impaling, Gules, on a fess Or a mullet Sable, between six martlets, three, two and one, of the second (Beauchamp)	Daughter of: John Beauchamp of Bletso and Edith Stourton. Married to: Sir Oliver St John, of Bletsoe; 1425–1437. Married to: John Beaufort, Duke of Somerset; 1439–1444. Married to: Lionel de Welles, Baron Welles; 1447–1461.

Arms	Name	Life	Blazon	Notes
	Lady Margaret Beaufort	1443–1509	Quarterly, 1st and 4th, France moderne, 2nd and 3rd England, within a bordure componée Argent and Azure Quarterly, France moderne and England, a bordure Azure charged alternatively with fleurs de lys and martlets Or, impaling, Quarterly, 1st and 4th, France moderne, 2nd and 3rd England, within a bordure componée Argent and Azure	Daughter of: John Beaufort, Duke of Somerset and Margaret Beauchamp. Married to: Edmund Tudor, 1st Earl of Richmond; 1455–1456. Married to: Sir Henry Stafford; 1462–1471. Married to: Thomas Stanley, Earl of Derby; 1472–1504.
	Edmund Tudor, Earl of Richmond	1430–1456	Quarterly, France moderne and England, a bordure Azure charged alternatively with fleurs de lys and martlets Or	Son of: Sir Owen Tudor and Catherine of Valois. Half brother to King Henry VI, legitimated by Parliament in 1453.

Arms	Name	Life	Blazon	Notes
	Henry Tudor, Earl of Richmond (later King Henry VII)	1457–1509	Quarterly, France moderne and England, a bordure Azure charged alternatively with fleurs de lys and martlets Or Quarterly, 1st and 4th, France moderne, 2nd and 3rd England	Son of: Edmund Tudor, Earl of Richmond and Lady Margaret Beaufort. Defeats King Richard III at the Battle of Bosworth Field in 1485, claims the throne as King Henry VII. See: House of Tudor
	Elizabeth of York	1466–1503	Quarterly, 1st, quarterly, 1st and 4th, France moderne, 2nd and 3rd England, 2nd and 3rd de Burgh, 4th Mortimer	Daughter of: King Edward IV and Elizabeth Woodville. Married to: King Henry VII; 1486–1503. Heiress of the House of York.

=== Descendants of Henry Beaufort, 3rd Duke of Somerset ===
Arms	Name	Life	Blazon	Notes
	Charles Somerset, 1st Earl of Worcester, K.G.	1460–1526	Quarterly, 1st and 4th, France ancien, 2nd and 3rd England, within a bordure componée Argent and Azure (Beaufort) with argent baton sinister, with escutcheon of pretence of per pale azure and gules, three lions rampant argent, 2 and 1 (Herbert).	An illegitimate son of Henry Beaufort, 3rd Duke of Somerset by his mistress Joan Hill. He was invested as a Knight of the Garter in about 1496. On 1 February 1514 he was created Earl of Worcester and was at some time appointed Lord Chamberlain of the Household to King Henry VIII. As Lord Chamberlain, Somerset was largely responsible for the preparations for the Field of Cloth of Gold in 1520. He was a favourite of Henry VII and Henry VIII

Arms	Name	Life	Blazon	Notes
	William Somerset, 3rd Earl of Worcester, K.G.	1526/7–1589	Quarterly, 1st and 4th, or a fess quarterly 1st and 4th France moderne, 2nd and 3rd England, within a bordure componée Argent and Azure (Beaufort), 2nd, per pale azure and gules, three lions rampant argent, 2 and 1 (Herbert), 3d argent a fess gules, with a canton gules (Woodville).	Eldest son of Henry Somerset, 2nd Earl of Worcester and his second wife Elizabeth Browne.

Arms	Name	Life	Blazon	Notes
	Edward Somerset, 4th Earl of Worcester, K.G.	1550–1628	Grand quarters, 1st and 4th, quarterly, 1st and 4th, France moderne, 2nd and 3rd England, within a bordure componée Argent and Azure (Beaufort), 2nd per pale azure and gules, three lions rampant argent, 2 and 1 (Herbert), 3d argent a fess gules, with a canton gules (Woodville).	Eldest son of William Somerset, 3rd Earl of Worcester. He was an important advisor to King James I (James VI of Scots), serving as Lord Privy Seal.

Arms	Name	Life	Blazon	Notes
	Henry Somerset, 1st Duke of Beaufort, K.G., PC	1629–1700	Quarterly, 1st and 4th France moderne, 2nd and 3rd England, within a bordure componée Argent and Azure (Beaufort).	Eldest son of Edward Somerset, 2nd Marquess of Worcester. He was a Welsh politician who sat in the House of Commons at various times between 1654 and 1667, when he succeeded his father as 3rd Marquess of Worcester. He was styled Lord Herbert from 1644 until 3 April 1667. The Dukedom of Beaufort was bestowed upon him by King Charles II in 1682. He is the ancestor of the current Somersets, and so the Dukes of Beaufort and the Barons Raglan. The current head of the house is Henry Somerset, 12th Duke of Beaufort.

== See also ==
- Royal arms of England
- House of Plantagenet
- Issue of Edward III of England
- House of Lancaster
- House of York
- House of Beaufort
- War of the Roses
