= Thomas Holland, Duke of Surrey =

14th-century English noble

Thomas Holland
- Duke of Surrey, Earl of Kent
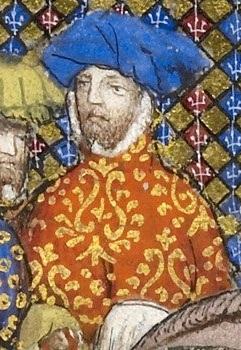
- Thomas Holland, Duke of Surrey, in the chronicle of Jean Creton, circa 1405
- Born: 8 September 1372
- Died: 7 January 1400 (aged 27); Cirencester, Gloucestershire
- Burial: Mount Grace Priory, Yorkshire
- Spouse: Joan Stafford (m. 1392)
- House: Holland
- Father: Thomas Holland, 2nd Earl of Kent
- Mother: Alice FitzAlan

Thomas Holland, Duke of Surrey, 3rd Earl of Kent, KG, Earl Marshal (8 September 1372 – 7 January 1400) was an English nobleman and courtier.

== Early life and family ==
Arms of Thomas Holland, Duke of Surrey, before 1397

Born on 8 September 1372, Thomas Holland was the eldest son and heir of Thomas Holland, 2nd Earl of Kent (1350–1397), and Alice FitzAlan, daughter of Richard FitzAlan, 3rd Earl of Arundel. His father was a maternal half-brother of King Richard II, and the younger Thomas had two brothers and six sisters.

Shortly after 20 October 1392, Thomas Holland married Joan Stafford, daughter of Hugh, Earl of Stafford. In 1394 he and his father accompanied the king to Ireland.

Arms of Thomas Holland, 1399

On his father's death in 1397 he succeeded him as 3rd Earl of Kent and 4th Baron Holland. At that time Kent's uncle King Richard II was removing the Duke of Gloucester and his associates from power, and sent Kent to arrest his own uncle, the Earl of Arundel. In reward he received a share of the forfeited estates, and on 29 September 1397 was created Duke of Surrey. Another uncle, the Earl of Huntingdon, was created Duke of Exeter on that day as well. In 1398 he founded Mount Grace Priory in Yorkshire.

== Last years and execution ==
Surrey, along with many of King Richard II's advisors, was arrested after the King's deposition by King Henry IV in 1399. In the end he had to forfeit the honours and estates he had gained after the arrests of Gloucester and Arundel, in particular the Dukedom of Surrey, although he retained the Earldom of Kent.

Early in 1400, Kent, along with his uncle, the Earl of Huntingdon (no longer Duke of Exeter), plotted to kill King Henry IV and free King Richard II from prison and return him to the throne. This "Epiphany Rising" failed and Kent was captured and executed.

He was succeeded as Earl of Kent by his brother Edmund.

== Ancestry ==
Ancestors of Thomas Holland, Duke of Surrey

8. Robert Holland, 1st Baron Holand (Note: Stansfield 1987, p. 310)
4. Thomas Holland, 1st Earl of Kent
9. Maud la Zouche
2. Thomas Holland, 2nd Earl of Kent
10. Edmund of Woodstock, 1st Earl of Kent (Note: Stansfield 1987, p. 312)
5. Joan, 4th Countess of Kent
11. Margaret Wake, 3rd Baroness Wake
1. Thomas Holland, Duke of Surrey
12. Edmund FitzAlan, 2nd Earl of Arundel (Note: Given-Wilson, C. (2004). "Fitzalan, Edmund, second earl of Arundel (1285–1326)". Oxford Dictionary of National Biography (online) (online ed.). Oxford University Press. doi:10.1093/ref:odnb/9529. (Subscription, Wikipedia Library access or UK public library membership required.))
6. Richard FitzAlan, 3rd Earl of Arundel
13. Alice de Warenne
3. Alice FitzAlan
14. Henry, 3rd Earl of Lancaster
7. Eleanor of Lancaster
15. Maud Chaworth

Political offices
| Preceded by The Duke of Norfolk | Earl Marshal; 1398–1399 | Succeeded by The Earl of Westmorland |
Peerage of England
| Preceded by New creation | Duke of Surrey; 1397–1399 | Succeeded by Renounced |
| Preceded by Thomas Holland | Earl of Kent; 1397–1400 | Succeeded by Edmund Holland |
