= Thomas Wake, 2nd Baron Wake of Liddell =

14th-century English baron

Thomas Wake
- 2nd Baron Wake of Liddell
- Arms of Baron Wake

Baron Wake of Liddell
- Predecessor: John Wake, 1st Baron Wake of Liddell
- Successor: Margaret Wake, 3rd Baroness Wake of Liddell
- Born: 1297
- Died: 31 May 1349 (aged 51–52)
- Wars and battles: Hundred Years' War; Second War of Scottish Independence
- Noble family: Wake
- Father: John Wake, 1st Baron Wake of Liddell
- Mother: Joan de Fiennes

Thomas Wake, 2nd Baron Wake of Liddell (1297 – 31 May 1349), English baron, belonged to a Lincolnshire family which had lands also in Cumberland, being the son of John Wake, 1st Baron Wake of Liddell (died 1300), and the grandson of Baldwin Wake (died 1282), both warriors of repute.

Among Thomas Wake's guardians were Piers Gaveston and Henry, Earl of Lancaster, whose daughter Blanche (died 1380) he married before 1317. This lady was the niece of Thomas, Earl of Lancaster, and her husband was thus attached to the Lancastrian party, but he did not follow Thomas of Lancaster in the proceedings which led to his death in 1322. Hating the favourites of Edward II, Wake joined Queen Isabella in 1326 and was a member of the small council which advised the young king, Edward III; soon, however, he broke away from the queen and her ally, Roger Mortimer, and in conjunction with his father-in-law, now earl of Lancaster, he joined the malcontent barons.

He was possibly implicated in the plot which cost his brother-in-law, Edmund of Woodstock, 1st Earl of Kent, his life in 1330, and he fled to France, returning to England after the overthrow of Isabella and Mortimer. Edward III made him governor of the Channel Islands and he assisted Edward Balliol to invade Scotland, being afterwards sent on an errand to France. In 1341, he incurred the displeasure of the king and was imprisoned, but he had been restored and had been employed in Brittany and elsewhere when he died childless.

His estates passed to his sister Margaret (died 1349), widow of Edmund of Woodstock, Earl of Kent, then to her son John (died 1352), and later to her daughter Joan who became 4th Countess of Kent. Through Joan of Kent's marriage to Thomas Holland, the title and estates were passed down to the Holland family. Wake founded a monastery Haltemprice Priory for the Austin canons at Newton near Cottingham, East Riding of Yorkshire, where he is buried.

Legal offices
| Preceded by The Earl of Winchester | Justice in Eyre south of the Trent; 1326–1328 | Succeeded by The Lord Zouche of Mortimer |
Peerage of England
| Preceded by John Wake | Baron Wake of Liddell; 1300–1349 | Succeeded by Margaret Wake |
