= Maud Holland =

English noblewoman

- Lady Courtenay, Countess of St Pol
- Born: c. 1354
- Died: 1392 (aged around 38)
- Spouses: Hugh Courtenay (c. 1365 – 1374); Waleran III, Count of Ligny (1380 – 1392)
- Father: Thomas Holland, 1st Earl of Kent
- Mother: Joan of Kent

Maud Holland, LG (c. 1354 – 1392), also known by her titles through marriage as Lady Courtenay and Countess of St Pol, was an English noblewoman. She was a daughter of Thomas Holland, 1st Earl of Kent and Joan of Kent. After Thomas' death Joan married Edward the Black Prince, who was then Prince of Wales. One of Joan and Edward's sons (Maud's half-brothers) was the future King of England, Richard II. When she was aged around eight Edward arranged a marriage for Maud to Hugh Courtenay, whom she married, with royal and papal approval. Her husband, with whom she had no children, died in 1374. Maud was one of the first women to be invested as ladies of the Order of the Garter, when Richard II appointed many of his relatives to the order in 1378. In 1380 Maud married Waleran III, Count of Ligny, a French nobleman. After her death she was apparently buried in Westminster Abbey but the location of her grave is not known.

== Biography ==
Maud Holland was born circa 1354. She was the second daughter of Thomas Holland, 1st Earl of Kent and Joan of Kent. She had one sister, Joan, and two brothers: Thomas Holland, who became the 2nd Earl of Kent, and John Holland who became the 1st Duke of Exeter. After Maud's father Thomas' death in 1360 Joan married Edward the Black Prince, who was then Prince of Wales. Maud was therefore a half-sister to the future king of England Richard II (who was Edward and Joan's son).

Edward was involved in arranging the marriage of Maud. He agreed with Hugh de Courtenay, 2nd/10th Earl of Devon in October 1362, when Maud was aged around eight, that she would marry Devon's grandson and heir Hugh Courtenay. Devon promised to award Maud an annuity of 200 marks and the manors of Sutton Courtenay in Berkshire and Waddesdon in Buckinghamshire. In return Edward promised to pay Devon four instalments of 1,000 marks at 6-monthly intervals. The arrangements received papal dispensation from Pope Urban V and the approval of the English king, the Black Prince's father, Edward III.

Around the middle of 1364 Maud and her brother Thomas, who was to be married to Alice FitzAlan, daughter of Richard Fitzalan, 3rd Earl of Arundel, were escorted back to England from Edward's court at Aquitaine in southern France for their marriages. Maud's wedding had taken place by February 1365, when the manors were granted. It is likely that she remained in her mother's household for some time afterwards as she was then aged around ten and the dangers of consummation of marriages in young girls were well known. Maud and Hugh had no children and Hugh had died by February 1374.

Although Richard II, who succeeded Edward III, appears to have had little interest in Maud and her sister Joan, he appointed Maud as a lady of the Order of the Garter on 23 April 1378. Only two women had previously been accorded this honour and Maud was one of eight invested that day, all close relatives of the king, including Maud's mother. At her investiture she received a pair of paternosters with gold fastenings from John of Gaunt, Richard II's uncle.

In 1380 Maud was married to Waleran III, Count of Ligny, a French nobleman, and afterwards lived in the County of Saint-Pol, one of Waleran's holdings from which she drew her title. Maud and Waleran had one daughter, Jeanne (d. 1407), who married Antoine, Duke of Brabant in 1401. Maud's funeral was held at Westminster Abbey on 23 April 1392 and was attended by Richard II. She was apparently buried in the abbey but the location of her grave is not known.
