= Baron Wake of Liddell =

English noble title

Arms of Baron Wake. Or, two bars gules, in chief three torteaux.

Baron Wake of Liddell is an abeyant title in the Peerage of England. It was created in 1295 (730 years ago) for John Wake. It has been in abeyance since 1408 (617 years ago).

== John Wake ==
John Wake was born in 1268, the son of Baldwin Wake and Hawise de Quincy.

He campaigned in Gascony between 1288 and 1297. He campaigned against the Scots between 1297 and 1300. To this he was appointed Joint Captain of March of Scotland in Cumberland and Westmoreland in 1297. He fought at the Battle of Falkirk (1298).

He was to married Joan de Fiennes by 24 September 1291. She was allegedly daughter of either Sir John FitzBernard of Kingsdown, Kent, or William de Fenes/Fiennes, a Spanish count, and Blanche de Brienne, Dame de La Loupelande. Joan de Fenes was possibly a relative of Edward I. She died just prior to 26 October 1309.

John Wake, 1st Lord Wake, was created baron by writ of summons to Parliament on 24 June 1295. He died circa 10 April 1300.

Through his mother, John Wake, 1st Baron Wake of Liddell was a great-great-grandson of King John of England. He was great-grandfather of Richard II of England.

The family claimed descent from Hereward the Wake's daughter by his second wife, Alftruda.

Children of John Wake, 1st Lord Wake and Joan de Fiennes:

1. John Wake – died between 1320 and 1349
2. Thomas Wake, 2nd Lord Wake born c. 20 Mar 1297/98, d. 30/31 May 1349
3. Margaret Wake, born c. 1300, d. 29 September 1349

In 1408 after the death of Edmund Holland, 8th Baron Wake of Liddell and 4th Earl of Kent, the title went into abeyance, which has never been terminated. Edmund had six sisters, the youngest Bridget was nun, the oldest predeceased him and the second had no children.

== Barons Wake of Liddell (1295) ==
- John Wake, 1st Baron Wake of Liddell (1268 – c. 4 October 1300)
- Thomas Wake, 2nd Baron Wake of Liddell (1297–1349)
- Margaret Wake, 3rd Baroness Wake of Liddell (c. 1300 –1349)
- John, 4th Baron Wake of Liddell and 3rd Earl of Kent (1330–1352)
- Joan, 5th Baroness Wake of Liddell and Countess of Kent (1328–1385)
- Thomas Holland, 6th Baron Wake of Liddell and 2nd Earl of Kent (1350–1397)
- Thomas Holland, 7th Baron Wake of Liddell, 3rd Earl of Kent, and 1st Duke of Surrey (1374–1400)
- Edmund Holland, 8th Baron Wake of Liddell and 4th Earl of Kent (1384–1408) (abeyance)
  - 1/6 Share in the Barony to each surviving sister and the eldest's only son:
    - Edmund Mortimer, 5th Earl of March, share eventually split into a third to Edward IV, likely subject to merging in the crown, and the other two going to the daughters of Edward Charlton, 5th Baron Charlton.
    - Joan Holland, married four times, but was childless, share divided equally among the other lines
    - Margaret Holland, Duchess of Clarence, share eventually passed to Henry VIII, likely subject to merging in the crown
    - Elizabeth Holland, Lady Neville, share eventually passed to Charles Neville, 6th Earl of Westmorland and then not exactly known; Charles had 1/4 Share (or 3/8 if the Clarence share are discounted due to merging in the crown) and was survived by four daughters, of which two had no children and none had any sons.
    - Eleanor Holland, Countess of Salisbury, share eventually passed to Henry Pole, 1st Baron Montagu. Through his two daughters it split between the Earls of Huntingdon and the Barrington baronets, each line taking 1/8 Share (or 3/16 if the Clarence share are discounted due to merging in the crown)
    - Bridget Holland, never married as she was a nun, share divided equally among the other lines
