= Jean Creton =

Medieval French historian and poet

Jean Creton (fl. 1386–1420) was a medieval French historian and poet who served as valet de chambre (or squire) to King Charles VI of France in the late fourteenth century. He is most notable, however, for his chronicle (Note: Histoire du Roy d'Angeterre, particulierement; a rebellion de ses subjetz, printed off Bibliothèque nationale de France MS, nouvelles acquisitions fr, 6223.Translated into English by J. Webb as Translation of a French metrical history of the deposition of King Richard the Second for Archaeologia XX (1824), pp. 18–239.) (written in verse) that he wrote of his travels to England in 1399, where he was an eyewitness to the deposition of King Richard II. Although he seems to have visited for the purposes of "amusement and to see the country," with a now unknown companion, he witnessed at first hand the events leading up to the deposition of King Richard II of England by his cousin Henry Bolingbroke. It has been described as the "fullest and most circumstantial" of the various contemporary narratives.

== Travels with the King and deposition ==
Creton travelled to Ireland with the King on his expeditionary force in May 1399, but was sent back to Wales with the Earl of Salisbury two months later.

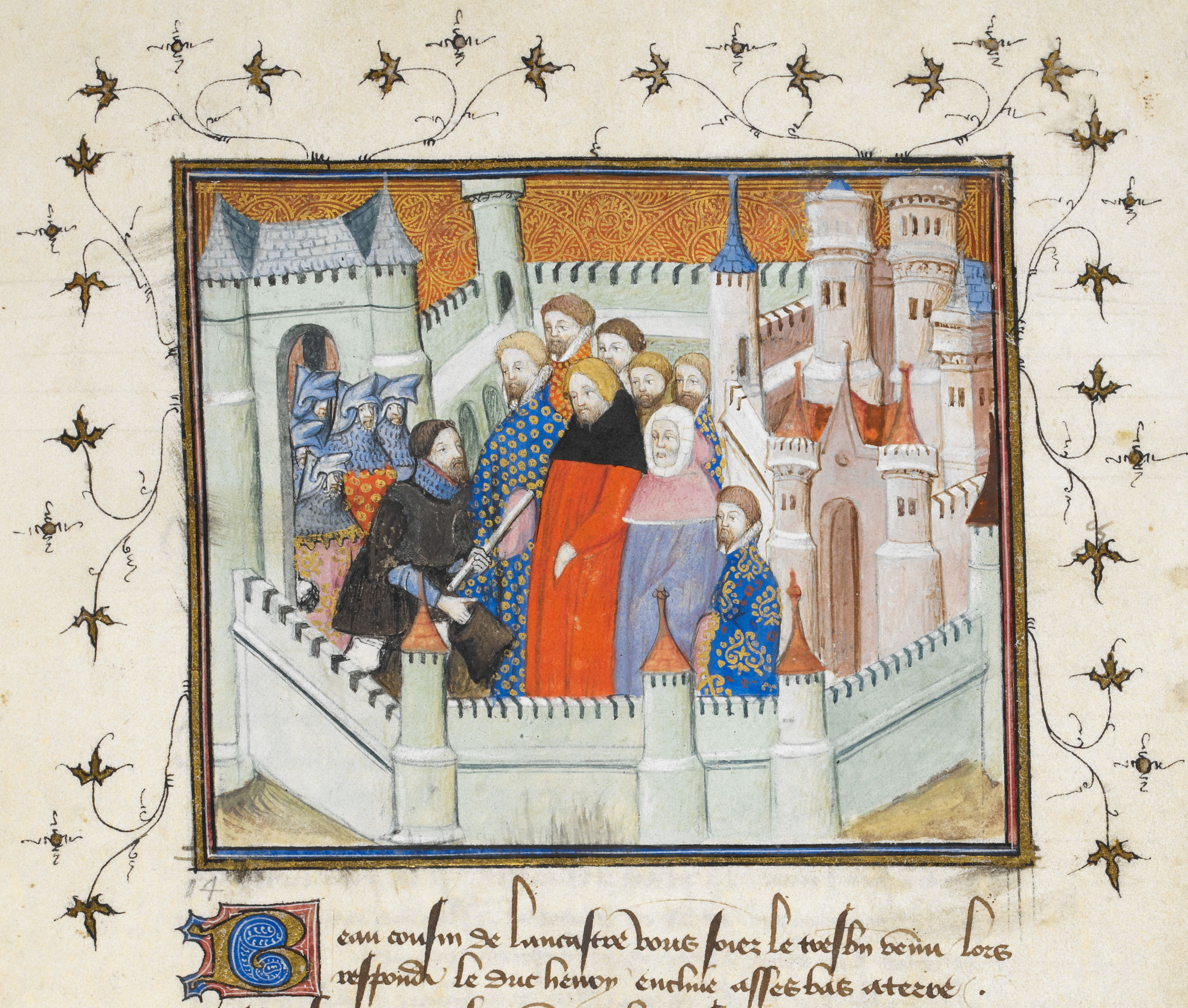
Henry Bolingbroke and Richard II at Flint Castle; page from the illuminated manuscript of Creton's La Prinse et Mort du roy Richart ("The Capture and Death of King Richard"), Harleian Collection, in the British Library, once in the collection of Jean de Valois, Duc de Berry.

Creton had deliberately joined Salisbury's retinue because of the earl's mighty chivalric reputation. The following month, August, saw the hurried return of the King from Ireland, alarmed at the news of Bolingbroke's landing at Ravenspur, Yorkshire, when he should have been in exile. Creton waited with the King at Conway Castle, and here he witnessed the Earl of Northumberland arrival and then that of Bolingbroke. Along with the other minor members of the royal entourage, Creton was required by the earl to leave the castle with Bolingbroke's herald. The chronicler was later open about the fact that, as a recent scholar has put it, Creton "was more frightened than he had ever been in his life." However, on hearing that Creton and his companions were French, Bolingbroke addressed them in their own language and assured them of their personal safety.

One modern English historian of the period has noted how, although Creton was clearly biased towards Richard — who had, after all, personally ensured that he was well looked after during his stay — Creton was still both willing and able to "give credit to Bolingbroke, for... his considerate treatment of the capture King" (and indeed towards himself). Creton noted that when Bolingbroke met Richard at Conway, it was an emotional encounter, with both being tearful and distressed." The king surrendered himself to Lancaster. Following Bolingbroke's capture of the King, Creton secured an interview with him, at which, explaining their position as foreign visitors, he and his associate "pleaded for their lives." Henry granted them their safety, but Creton tells how, being "sad and sick at heart," it was then that they chose to return to France. He may however have witnessed Henry's coronation as King Henry IV, as he later described how — to his dissatisfaction — the crowds of London greeted the new King with as much rapture as if it had been Jesus entering the city.

== The Metrical History ==
Creton's chronicle of events, whilst written with the benefit of hindsight, (Note: And possibly biases, of course: He wrote how, "evil and unreasonable people as they are, the English mortally hate the French." He noted however how Richard himself "loyally loved his father-in-law the King of France with a love as true and sincere as any man alive.") and containing many of the usual factual errors of detail and chronology, found in most works of the period, "provides, in essentials, a credible account" of this fast-moving period. Creton explains that he was moved to write his account at the urging of the Earl of Salisbury, who had been captured with Richard (and, indeed, was executed the following year). It was doubtless only the fact that Creton had returned to France prior to setting down his thoughts on paper- and thus "beyond the reach of Henry's heavy hand"- that he was able to do so unmolested. This took place sometime between November 1401 and March 1402. It was not unusual for him to decide to do so. In fact, a group of French chronicles of Richard's reign were produced in somewhat of a flurry around this time, due to the fact that in 1396 Richard had married the French King's daughter Isabella. (Note: For example, the Chronique de la Traison et Mort de Richard Roy Dengleterre, by a Burgundian, previously within the household of the Duke of Exeter.)

"For which cause, I have taken the trouble to fulfil the promise that I made him, in the great sorrow and peril in which I left him"

— Jean Creton on why he commenced his chronicle.

Créton is notable for being one of the few contemporary chroniclers who believed Richard II was in fact alive after 1399- possibly, in fact, the only one. In his chronicle he says that, when Richard's body was displayed in St Paul's Cathedral in March 1400, he "certainly [did not] believe it was the old King," and, further, that "I think it was [Richard] Maudelyn, his chaplain, whose face, size, height and build were so exactly similar to the King's." He wrote as much to his own King, saying "the representation of [Richard's] image comes to me so often before the eyes of my heart, for by day and night all my mental imaginings" are solely about him. he later described weeping "tears of sympathy" for Richard. Believing Richard to still be alive, to this end, in April 1402, he travelled to Scotland, supposedly to meet with the King. However, soon he realised ("to his great disappointment") that the man he did meet with was in fact an imposter. He subsequently returned to France the same year to confirm Richard's supposedly violent death. (Note: As to uncertainty as to how R2 died) Creton himself reports that after the Epiphany Rising, the deposed king was "so vexed at heart by this evil news that from that time onwards he neither ate nor drank and thus, so they say, it came to pass that he died." He did not, however, report this while passing through England on his return to France. (Note: Indeed, it would have been unwise for him to have done so, as only about a month after Creton travelled to Scotland, Henry IV instructed that anyone who declared Richard to be living would face legal consequences.)
