= John Wake, 1st Baron Wake of Liddell =

English baron (c. 1268 - 4 October 1300)

John Wake
- 1st Baron Wake of Liddell
- Arms of Baron Wake ("two bars gules, in chief three torteaux")

Baron Wake of Liddell
- Reign: 1295–1300
- Predecessor: None
- Successor: Thomas Wake
- Full name: John Wake
- Born: c. 1268
- Died: 4 October 1300
- Noble family: Wake
- Spouse: Joan de Fiennes
- Issue: John Wake; Thomas Wake, 2nd Baron Wake of Liddell; Margaret Wake, 3rd Baroness Wake of Liddell
- Father: Baldwin Wake
- Mother: Hawise de Quincy

John Wake, 1st Baron Wake of Liddell (c. 1268 - 4 October 1300) was an English nobleman and soldier. He was one of the first barons created by writ of summons to Parliament in 1295 by King Edward I.

== Biography ==
John Wake was born around 1268, the son of Baldwin Wake and Hawise de Quincy, who was the daughter of Elen ferch Llywelyn and Sir Robert de Quincy

He married Joan de Fiennes by 24 September 1291. She was the daughter of William de Fiennes and Blanche de Brienne.

John Wake took part in military campaigns in Gascony from 1288 to 1297 and against the Scots from 1297 to 1300. He was appointed Joint Captain of March of Scotland in Cumberland and Westmoreland in 1297. He fought at the Battle of Falkirk in 1298.

In 1295, John Wake was made baron by writ.

John Wake died around 4 October 1300. He was succeeded by his son Thomas Wake.

== Issue ==
John Wake and his wife Joan de Fiennes had the following children:

1. John Wake – died between 1320 and 1349
2. Thomas Wake, 2nd Lord Wake born c. 20 Mar 1297/98, d. 30/31 May 1349
3. Margaret Wake, born c. 1300, d. 29 September 1349

In 1408 after the death of Edmund Holland, 8th Baron Wake of Liddell and 4th Earl of Kent, the title went into abeyance, which has never been terminated. Edmund had six sisters, the youngest Bridget was nun, the oldest predeceased him and the second had no children.
