= Banastre Rebellion =

1315 uprising in Lancashire, England

Date	October 1315
Location	Lancashire
Result	Lancaster Victory

Belligerents
Rebellious Lancastrian Knights	Earldom of Lancaster

Commanders and leaders
Sir Adam Banastre; Sir William de Bradshaigh; Sir Henry Lea Sir Ralph Bickerstaff, High Sheriff of Lancashire	Thomas, 2nd Earl of Lancaster; Robert Holland, 1st Baron Holand Edmund de Neville, Deputy Sheriff of Lancashire

Arms borne by Sir Adam Banastre at the first Dunstable tournament in 1308: argent, a cross patonce sable.

The Banastre Rebellion was an uprising in Lancashire, England, in 1315 against the Earl of Lancaster and his supporters. A group of disaffected knights decided to revenge themselves on the Earl of Lancaster by attacking his chief retainer and their rival, Sir Robert de Holland. The group was led by Sir Adam Banastre of Bank Hall, Bretherton, who had extensive landholdings in the county, Sir William de Bradshaigh of Haigh Hall and Sir Henry Lea of Charnock Richard. The cause of their grievance was that the powerful earl, the dominant force in the north-west of England, appeared to be favouring the Holland family to their disadvantage.

The group met on 8 October 1315 at Wingates, in Westhoughton, where they planned an attack on the pro-Holland Radcliffes of Radcliffe. Adam de Radcliffe was captured and the raiding party moved to the home of Sir Henry de Duxbury looking for his brothers and Sir Henry de Duxbury was imprisoned and fined five marks. The next day, they were joined by Sir Ralph Bickerstaff, the High Sheriff of Lancashire, and his men in Standish. That day the group raided the farm of the bailiff of the Rector of Wigan, another Holland supporter, stealing crops and other goods. They then raided Norley Hall, belonging to a Lancaster adherent Thurstan de Norley, seizing goods and livestock. The mob traversed far and wide across South Lancashire, attacking the homes and property of the earl's supporters. Halton Castle in Cheshire was captured by burning down the gates but an attempt to capture Liverpool Castle (then in the hands of Sir Robert Holland) was unsuccessful. Clitheroe Castle was taken and Preston terrorised.

Eventually Edmund de Neville, the Deputy Sheriff of Lancashire, organized a force loyal to the earl and confronted the rebels at Deepdale in Preston. Within an hour the rebels were routed and Sir Ralph Bickerstaff killed. Joined by a force under Robert de Holland, Neville moved south to round up fugitives. Sir Adam Banastre and Sir Henry de Lea were captured at Charnock Richard after being betrayed and were summarily beheaded. Sir William Bradshaigh escaped, possibly to Wales, and was outlawed.

After the Battle of Boroughbridge the Earl of Lancaster was executed at Pontefract and Sir Robert de Holland imprisoned. Sir William Bradshaigh was able to return to continue his feud with Sir Robert de Holland's successor, Sir Richard de Holland. Edward II had them arrested and Bradshaigh was imprisoned for several months. After Edward was overthrown in 1326, Sir Robert de Holland was released, only to be killed in 1328 by the new Earl of Lancaster's men for his treachery at Boroughbridge. Sir William Bradshaigh was killed in 1333 in a fight with the Radcliffes at Newton-le-Willows.
