= Thomas Holland, 2nd Earl of Kent =

English nobleman (1350–1397)

Thomas Holland
- Earl of Kent
- Arms of Thomas Holland, 2nd Earl of Kent: Arms of King Edward I within a bordure argent
- Other titles: Baron Holand; Baron Wake of Liddell
- Born: 1350; Upholland, Lancashire, England
- Died: 25 April 1397 (aged 46–47); Arundel Castle, Sussex, England
- Buried: Bourne Abbey, Lincolnshire
- Noble family: Holland family
- Spouse: Alice FitzAlan
- Issue more...: Alianore Holland, Countess of March; Thomas Holland, 1st Duke of Surrey; Joan Holland, Duchess of York; Edmund Holland, 4th Earl of Kent; Margaret Holland, Duchess of Clarence; Eleanor Holland, Countess of Salisbury
- Father: Thomas Holland, 1st Earl of Kent
- Mother: Joan of Kent

Thomas Holland, 2nd Earl of Kent KG (1350 – 25 April 1397) was an English nobleman and a councillor of his half-brother, King Richard II of England.

== Family and early life ==
Thomas Holland was born in Upholland, Lancashire, in 1350. He was the eldest surviving son of Thomas Holland, 1st Earl of Kent, and Joan "The Fair Maid of Kent". His mother was a daughter of Edmund of Woodstock, 1st Earl of Kent, and Margaret Wake. Edmund was in turn a son of Edward I of England and his second Queen consort Marguerite of France, and thus a younger half-brother of Edward II of England.

His father died in 1360, and later that year, on 28 December, Thomas became Baron Holand. His mother was still Countess of Kent in her own right, and in 1361 she married Edward, the Black Prince, the son of King Edward III.

== Military career ==
At sixteen, in 1366, Holland was appointed captain of the English forces in Aquitaine. Over the next decade he fought in various campaigns, including the Battle of Nájera, under the command of his stepfather Edward, the Black Prince. He was made a Knight of the Garter in 1375.

Richard II became king in 1377, and soon Holland acquired great influence over his younger half-brother, which he used for his own enrichment. In 1381, he succeeded as Earl of Kent.

== Later years and death ==
Prior to his death, Holland was appointed Governor of Carisbrooke Castle. Holland died at Arundel Castle, Sussex, England on 25 April 1397.

== Titles ==
- 2nd Earl of Kent (26 December 1360 – 25 April 1397) of the 1360 creation
- 5th Earl of Kent (7 August 1385 – 25 April 1397) of the 1321 creation
- 2nd Baron Holand (26 December 1360 – 25 April 1397) of the 1353 creation
- 6th Baron Wake of Liddell (7 August 1385 – 25 April 1397) of the 1295 creation

== Marriage and children ==
On 10 April 1364 Holland married Lady Alice FitzAlan, daughter of Richard FitzAlan, 10th Earl of Arundel by his wife Eleanor of Lancaster. By his wife he had four sons and six daughters. All the sons died without legitimate children, whereupon the daughters and their children became co-heiresses to the House of Holland. The children were as follows:

=== Sons ===
1. Thomas Holland, 3rd Earl of Kent, 1st Duke of Surrey (8 September 1372 – 7 January 1400), eldest son and heir, created Duke of Surrey. Died without children.
2. John Holland (2 November 1374 – 5 November 1394), second son, died without children
3. Richard Holland (3 April 1376 – 21 May 1396), third son
4. Edmund Holland, 4th Earl of Kent (9 January 1382 – 15 September 1408), heir to his elder brother. Died without legitimate children, but had an illegitimate child by his mistress Constance of York.

=== Daughters ===
By his daughters' marriages, he became the ancestor of many of the prominent figures in the Wars of the Roses, including Richard Plantagenet, 3rd Duke of York (father of Kings Edward IV and Richard III), Henry Tudor (later King Henry VII), and Warwick the Kingmaker, father of queen consort Anne Neville. He was also an ancestor of queen consort Catherine Parr, the sixth and last wife of King Henry VIII. His daughters were as follows:

1. Eleanor I Holland, alias Alianore (13 October 1370 – 23 October 1405). Married firstly to Roger Mortimer, 4th Earl of March (1374–1398), for a time heir presumptive to his mother's first cousin King Richard II, and left children. Following the deposition of Richard II in 1399 by his own first cousin, Henry IV, the claim to the throne of England was pursued by Roger's and Alianore's grandson Richard, Duke of York (1411–1460), the drawn-out struggle of which formed the basis for the Wars of the Roses. Secondly, she married Edward Charleton, 5th Baron Cherleton, and left children.
2. Joan Holland (c. 1380 – 12 April 1434), married Edmund of Langley, 1st Duke of York
3. Margaret Holland (1385 – 31 December 1439), married first John Beaufort, 1st Earl of Somerset, and second Thomas of Lancaster, 1st Duke of Clarence
4. Elizabeth Holland (c. 1388 – 1423), who married Sir John Neville (c.1387–1420), eldest son and heir of Ralph Neville, 1st Earl of Westmorland, and by him had three sons, Ralph Neville, 2nd Earl of Westmorland, John Neville, Baron Neville, and Sir Thomas Neville, and a daughter, Margaret Neville.
5. Eleanor II Holland (1386 – after 1413), who bore the same first name as her eldest sister, married Thomas Montacute, 4th Earl of Salisbury
6. Bridget Holland, who became a nun

== Footnotes ==
Legal offices
Preceded by John of Foxley	Justice in Eyre south of Trent; 1377–1397	Succeeded by The Earl of Rutland
Peerage of England
Preceded by Thomas Holland	Earl of Kent; 1360 creation 1381–1397	Succeeded by Thomas Holland
Preceded by Thomas Holland	Baron Holand; 1360–1397	Succeeded by Thomas Holland
Preceded by Joan of Kent	Earl of Kent; 1321 creation 1385–1397	Succeeded by Thomas Holland
Preceded by Joan of Kent	Baron Wake of Lidell; 1385–1397	Succeeded by Thomas Holland
