= Otho Holand =

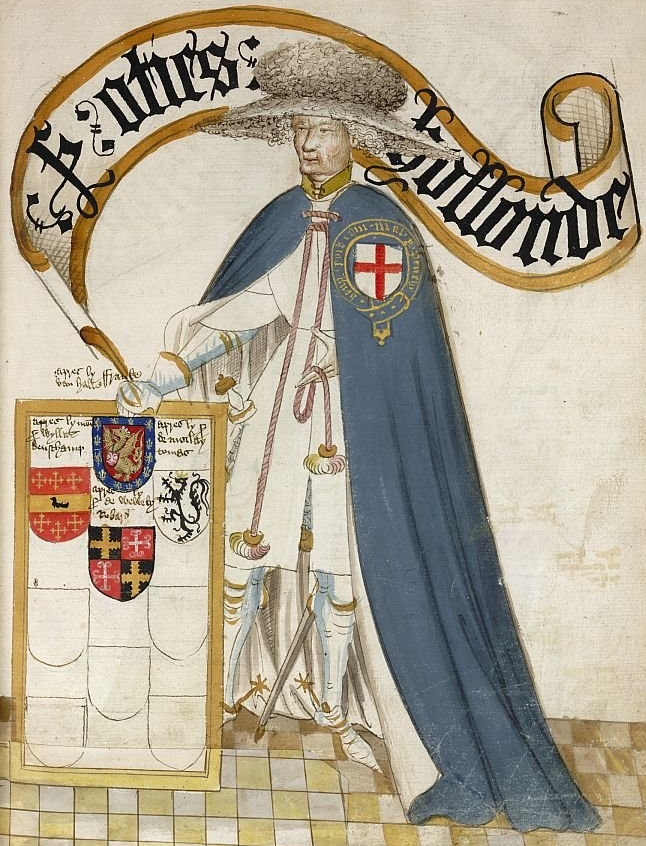
Sir Otho Holland, KG, shown wearing his garter robes over his tunic. Illustration from the 1430 "Bruges Garter Book" made by William Bruges (1375–1450), first Garter King of Arms

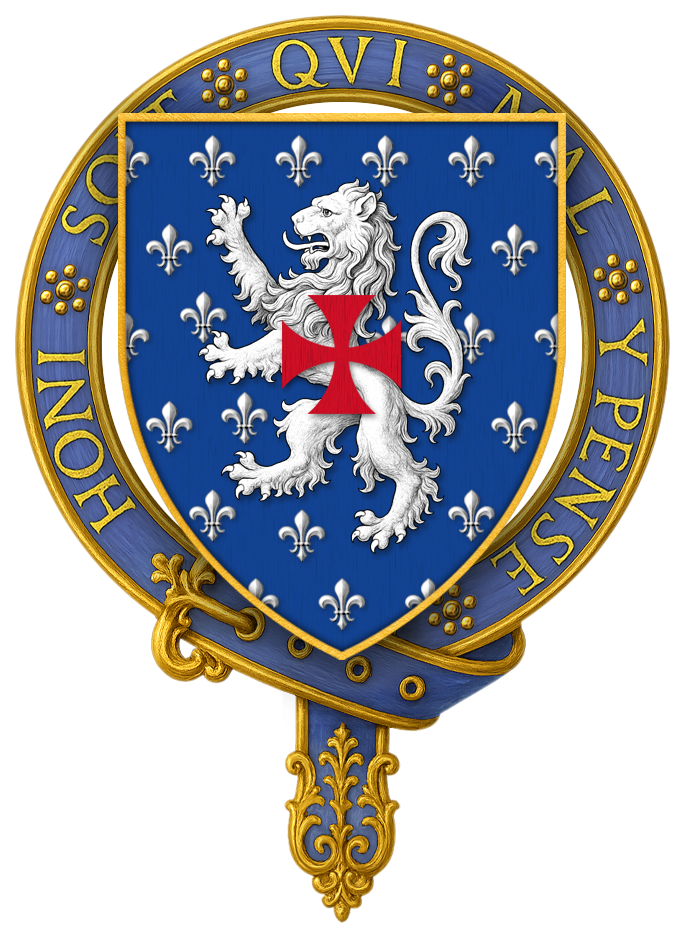
Arms of Sir Otho Holland, KG

Sir Otho Holand (c. 1316 – 3 September 1359) was an English soldier and a founder Knight of the Garter. He was alternatively called Otes or Eton Holand or Holland.

== Life ==
Otho was born in Brackley, Northamptonshire, a younger son of Robert de Holland, 1st Baron Holand of Upholland, Lancashire, by his wife Maud la Zouch. One of his brothers was Thomas Holland, 1st Earl of Kent, and also a founder Knight of the Garter.

Otho joined his brother Thomas in Edward III's military expedition to Normandy in 1346 and fought at the Battle of Caen. There the Constable of France surrendered himself to his brother who sold him to the King. Back in England the Constable was given to Otho to guard until he could be ransomed but Otho allowed his prisoner too much freedom (by allowing him to cross to France on parole) and was heavily censured as a result.

In 1348 he was invested, along with his brother Thomas, as a founder knight of the new Order of the Garter and allocated stall 23 at the home of the order in St George's Chapel at Windsor Castle. In 1355 he again joined his brother Thomas on a campaign in France, but was taken prisoner in Dauphiny and ransomed. He was made Governor of the Channel Islands in 1359.

He died childless in Normandy in 1359. His estates went to his brothers Robert and Thomas.
