= Edmund Holland, 4th Earl of Kent =

English nobleman

Edmund Holland, 4th Earl of Kent, 5th Baron Holland, KG (6 January 1383 – 15 September 1408) was the Earl of Kent from 1400 to 1408. He was the 106th Knight of the Order of the Garter in 1403.

Edmund was born in Brockenhurst, Hampshire, the second son of Thomas Holland, 2nd Earl of Kent and Alice Fitzalan. He was a younger brother of Thomas Holland, 1st Duke of Surrey; Edmund succeeded his childless brother as Earl of Kent on 7 January 1400. He was "appointed admiral of the west and north in 1407".

He married at St. Mary Overy, Southwark, on 24 January 1407, Lucia Visconti (c. 1380 – 4 April 1424), daughter of Bernabò Visconti, Lord of Milan, and wife Beatrice Regina della Scala, without issue. Shortly before the marriage, he had an affair with Constance of York and fathered illegitimately Eleanor de Holland born in c. 1407; Eleanor was later married to James Tuchet, 5th Baron Audley.

Edmund was killed at the battle of Île-de-Bréhat on 15 September 1408. As he had no legitimate issue, the earldom then became extinct. He is buried at Bourne Abbey in Lincolnshire.

== Bibliography ==
- Alison Weir. Britain's Royal Family: A Complete Genealogy. London, The Bodley Head, 1999, p. 111.
- Doubleday, H.A. & Howard de Walden, Lord, eds. (1929). The Complete Peerage. Vol. 7 (2nd ed.). London: St. Catherine Press.Archived.
- Kirby, J.L. (1987). Calendar of Inquisitions Post Mortem, volume 18: 1–6 Henry IV, 1399–1405. Vol. 18. London: HMSO.
- Mooney, Linne R., ed. (1998). The Kalendarium of John Somer. The Chaucer Library. Athens: University of Georgia Press. p. 116. ISBN 978-0-8203-2092-2. Archived from the original on 25 September 2006.
- Stansfield, M.M.N. (1987). The Hollands, Dukes of Exeter, Earls of Kent and Huntingdon, 1352–1475 (PDF) (PhD). Corpus Christi College, Oxford. Archived from the original (PDF) on 26 September 2018.
- Stansfield, M.M.N. (2004). "Holland, Edmund, seventh earl of Kent". Oxford Dictionary of National Biography (online) (online ed.). Oxford University Press. doi:10.1093/ref:odnb/13518. (Subscription, Wikipedia Library access or UK public library membership required.)

Peerage of England
Preceded by Thomas Holland	Earl of Kent; 6th 1400–1408	Extinct
Preceded by Thomas Holland	Baron Holand; Baron Wake of Liddell; 1400–1408	Abeyant
