= Margaret Wake, 3rd Baroness Wake of Liddell =

English noblewoman (c. 1297–1349)

Margaret Wake
- Countess of Kent

Baroness Wake of Liddell
- Predecessor: Thomas Wake
- Successor: John
- Born: c. 1297
- Died: 19 September 1349 (aged 53/54)
- Spouse: John Comyn (m. 1312; died 1314) Edmund of Woodstock, 1st Earl of Kent (m. 1325; died 1330)
- Issue: Aymer Comyn (1314–1316); Edmund, 2nd Earl of Kent; Margaret, Viscountess of Tartas; Joan, Princess of Wales; John, 3rd Earl of Kent
- Father: John Wake, 1st Baron Wake of Liddell
- Mother: Joan de Fiennes

Margaret Wake, suo jure 3rd Baroness Wake of Liddell and Countess of Kent (c. 1297 – 19 September 1349), was the wife of Edmund of Woodstock, 1st Earl of Kent, the youngest surviving son of Edward I of England and Margaret of France.

== Family ==
She was the daughter of John Wake, 1st Baron Wake of Liddell (son of Baldwin Wake and Hawise de Quincy) and Joan de Fiennes. By her grandmother Hawise, she was the great-granddaughter of Elen, daughter of Llywelyn the Great (Prince of Gwynedd) and Joan, Lady of Wales (the illegitimate daughter of John of England). Her mother, Joan de Fiennes, was a daughter of William de Fiennes and Blanche de Brienne. She was a sister of Margaret de Fiennes, making Wake a cousin of Roger Mortimer, 1st Earl of March (himself the great-grandson of Gwladus Ddu, Elen's sister). Joan de Fiennes also descended from John of Brienne and Berengaria of León, herself the granddaughter of Eleanor of England, Queen of Castile.

== Marriages and issue ==
Margaret married John Comyn IV of Badenoch (c. 1294 – 1314) around 1312, son of the John Comyn who was murdered by King Robert the Bruce in 1306. Her husband John died at the Battle of Bannockburn, and their only child, Aymer Comyn (1314–1316), died as a toddler.

She married, for a second time, Edmund of Woodstock, 1st Earl of Kent, the sixth son of King Edward I of England, and the second by his second wife Margaret of France. They received a papal dispensation in October 1325, and the wedding probably took place at Christmas. He was executed for treason in 1330.

Through her marriage to Edmund of Woodstock, Margaret was the mother of four children:

- Edmund, 2nd Earl of Kent (c.1326 – 5 October 1331).
- Margaret of Kent, Viscountess of Tartas (1327–1352). She married Arnaud Amanieu VII d'Albret.
- Joan of Kent (29 September 1326/1327 – 7 August 1385), known as the Fair Maid of Kent. She married firstly Thomas Holland, 1st Earl of Kent, son of Robert de Holland, 1st Baron Holand and Maud la Zouche; secondly William Montagu, 2nd Earl of Salisbury, son of William Montagu, 1st Earl of Salisbury and Catherine Grandison (the marriage was annulled); and thirdly Edward, the Black Prince, the eldest son and heir apparent of King Edward III of England and Queen Philippa of Hainault. She was the mother of King Richard II of England.
- John, 3rd Earl of Kent (7 April 1330 – 26 December 1352). He married Isabella of Julich (also known as Elizabeth), daughter of William V, Duke of Jülich, and Joanna of Hainaut.

After the execution of her second husband, the pregnant Margaret and her children were confined to Arundel Castle in Sussex. Her brother Thomas Wake, 2nd Baron Wake of Liddell was accused of treason but later pardoned.

When King Edward III of England reached his majority and overthrew the regents a few months later, he took in Margaret and her children and treated them as his own family. Margaret briefly succeeded her brother as Baroness Wake of Liddell in 1349, but died during an outbreak of the plague in September 1349.

Through their grandson, Thomas Holland, Margaret and her husband Edmund's descendants included both Edward IV (via Thomas's eldest and second daughters, Alinor and Joan) and Henry Tudor (via Thomas's third daughter, Margaret), from both of whom every English monarch from Henry VIII onwards descends. Thomas's daughter Margaret was also ancestor of every king of Scotland from James II, while Alinor was also ancestor of royal spouses Anne Neville and Catherine Parr.

== Depictions in fiction ==
Margaret is a supporting character in the Karen Harper historical fiction novel The First Princess of Wales, which gives a fictional depiction of her daughter Joan of Kent's life at the English court.

Margaret is a character in the 2014 novel A Triple Knot by Emma Campion which primarily focuses on her daughter Joan of Kent's struggle to validate her secret marriage to Thomas Holland after her family forces her into a marriage with William Montacute, and her close, often uncomfortable relationship with her cousin and future husband Edward, Prince of Wales.

== Ancestry ==
Ancestors of Margaret Wake, 3rd Baroness Wake of Liddell

8. Hugh Wake
4. Baldwin Wake
9. Joan de Stuteville
2. John Wake, 1st Baron Wake of Liddell
10. Robert de Quincy
5. Hawise de Quincy
11. Elen ferch Llywelyn
1. Margaret Wake, 3rd Baroness Wake of Liddell
12. Enguerrand II de Fiennes
6. William de Fiennes, Baron of Tingry
13. Isabelle de Conde
3. Joan de Fiennes
14. Jean de Brienne
7. Blanche de Brienne
15. Jeanne de Châteaudun

Peerage of England
Preceded by Thomas Wake	Baroness Wake of Liddell; 1349	Succeeded by John
