= Epiphany Rising =

1400 rebellion against Henry IV of England

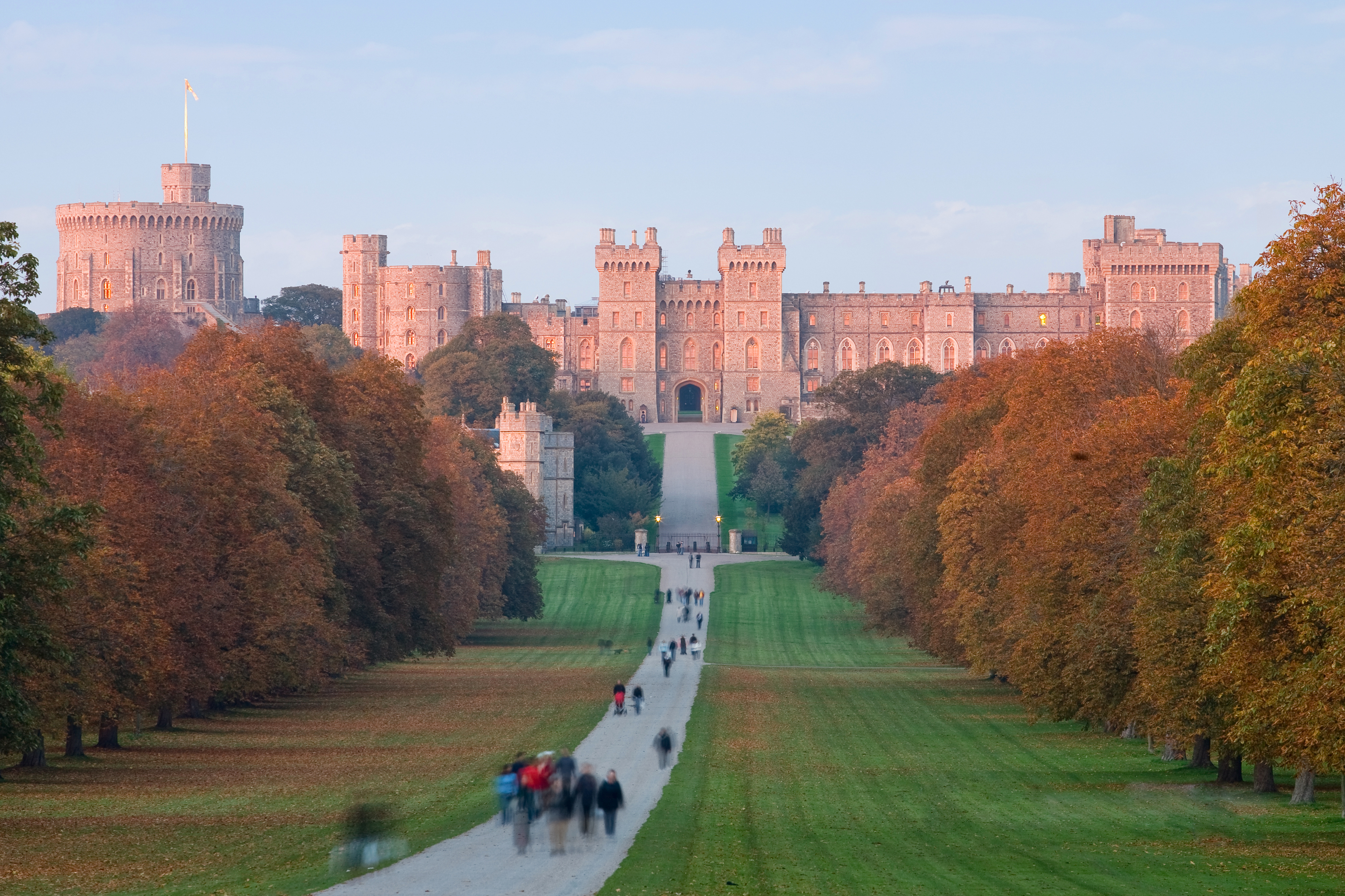
- Windsor Castle, where Henry IV stayed during the Epiphany Rising
Date	4–16 January 1400
Location	England and Wales
Result	Royal victory

Belligerents
Kingdom of England	Rebel forces

Commanders and leaders
King Henry IV; Earl of Warwick; Earl of Somerset	Earl of Salisbury (executed); Earl of Huntingdon (executed); Earl of Kent (executed); Baron Despenser (executed)

The Epiphany Rising was a failed rebellion against King Henry IV of England in early January 1400.

== Background ==
Richard II rewarded those who had supported him against Gloucester and the Lords Appellant with a plethora of new titles. Upon the usurpation and accession of King Henry IV in 1399, many of those titles were placed under attainder, due to the complicity of their holders in the murder of the Duke of Gloucester.

== Conspiracy ==
The ringleaders of the conspiracy were John Montagu, 3rd Earl of Salisbury, John Holland, 1st Earl of Huntingdon (formerly Duke of Exeter and husband of Henry IV's sister Elizabeth) and half-brother to Richard II, Thomas Holland, 3rd Earl of Kent (formerly Duke of Surrey), and Thomas le Despenser, 4th Baron le Despencer (formerly Earl of Gloucester). Other members included Edward of Norwich, 1st Earl of Rutland (formerly Duke of Aumale), Ralph Lumley, 1st Baron Lumley, Sir Thomas Blount and Sir Bernard Brocas. They met on 17 December 1399 at the Abbey house in Westminster and plotted to capture the new King Henry IV while he was at Windsor for the feast of Epiphany (6 January).

They hoped to seize the king during a tournament, kill him, and restore Richard II to the throne. However, Edward of Norwich betrayed the conspirators to King Henry, although according to Tait, contemporary English sources which describe the conspiracy make no mention of Rutland, and his role in it is open to doubt. Nevertheless, forewarned, Henry failed to appear at Windsor and began to raise an army in London. Kent and Salisbury arrived at the castle with a force of about 400 men-at-arms and archers, but hearing that the king, forewarned, was no longer there, quickly left.

== Aftermath ==
The conspirators fled to the western counties and raised the standard of rebellion. However, they obtained little support and were quickly apprehended by local authorities. While attempting to seize Cirencester, Lumley was beheaded in a short but violent skirmish by the townsfolk and Salisbury and Kent were captured. Held briefly in custody, they were abruptly beheaded without trial on 7 January 1400. Le Despenser was captured at Bristol by a mob and was also summarily beheaded on 13 January 1400. Huntingdon was captured at Pleshey and dealt with likewise on 16 January 1400. Blount escaped to Oxford, where he was hanged, drawn and quartered on 12 January 1400. Brocas was captured in Cirencester and beheaded at Tyburn. Those executed were subsequently attainted in March; the brother of Kent and the sons of Salisbury and Huntingdon were later restored to their fathers' titles. The attainders were formally reversed in 1461 by a Yorkist parliament.

The rebellion also convinced Henry IV that a deposed, imprisoned and alive King Richard was a very dangerous liability for him. The deposed monarch would come to his death 'by means unknown' in Pontefract Castle by 17 February 1400.
