= Baron Holand =

Baron Holand is a title in the Peerage of England. It was created twice, in 1314 and 1353. The first creation was extinguished by attainder and the second is in abeyance.

== Barons Holand, first creation (1314) ==
Arms of de Holland, Baron Holand: Azure semée-de-lys argent, a lion rampant of the second, armed and langued gules

- Robert de Holland, 1st Baron Holand (1290–1328)
- Robert de Holland, 2nd Baron Holand (1312–1373)
- Maud Lovel, 3rd Baroness Holand (1356 – c. 1420)
- William Lovel, 4th Baron Holand and 7th Baron Lovel (1397–1454)
- John Lovel, 5th Baron Holand and 8th Baron Lovel (1432–1465)
- Francis Lovel, 6th Baron Holand, 9th Baron Lovel and 1st Viscount Lovel (1456–1487), created Viscount Lovel 1483, titles forfeit 1485

== Barons Holand, second creation (1354) ==
See Earl of Kent, 1360 creation
