= John Holland, 1st Duke of Exeter =

English nobleman (c. 1352–1400)

John Holland
- 1st Duke of Exeter (1397–1399); 1st Earl of Huntingdon (1388–1400)
- Born: c. 1352
- Died: 16 January 1400 (aged 47–48)
- Noble family: Holland
- Spouse: Elizabeth of Lancaster
- Issue: Richard Holland, 2nd Earl of Huntingdon; Constance Holland, Countess of Norfolk; Elizabeth Holland; Alice Holland, Countess of Oxford; John Holland, 2nd Duke of Exeter; Sir Edward Holland
- Father: Thomas Holland, 1st Earl of Kent
- Mother: Joan, "The Fair Maid of Kent"

John Holland, 1st Duke of Exeter, 1st Earl of Huntingdon (c. 1352 – 16 January 1400) of Dartington Hall in Devon, was a half-brother of King Richard II (1377–1399), to whom he remained strongly loyal. He is primarily remembered for being suspected of assisting in the downfall of King Richard's uncle Thomas of Woodstock, 1st Duke of Gloucester (1355–1397) (youngest son of King Edward III), and then for conspiring against King Richard's first cousin and eventual deposer, Henry Bolingbroke, later King Henry IV (1399–1413).

== Origins ==
Arms of arms of John Holland, 1st Duke of Exeter: Royal Arms of England within a bordure argent semy of fleurs-de-lys or

John was the third son of Thomas Holland by his wife Joan of Kent, "The Fair Maid of Kent". Joan was daughter of Edmund of Woodstock, 1st Earl of Kent, a son of King Edward I (1272–1307), and Thomas would be made Earl of Kent, in what is considered a new creation, as husband of Joan, in whom the former Earldom was vested as eventual heiress of Edmund of Woodstock. Joan later married Edward the Black Prince, the eldest son and heir apparent of her first cousin King Edward III, by whom she had a son, King Richard II, who was thus a half-brother of John Holland.

== Political career ==
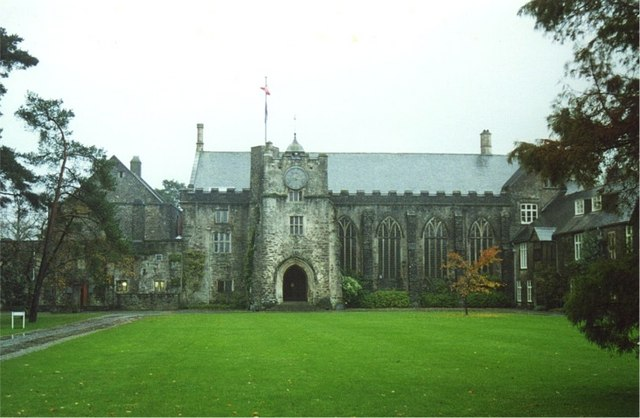
The great hall at Dartington, built by the 1st Duke of Exeter

Early in King Richard's reign, Holland was made a Knight of the Garter (1381). He was also part of the escort that accompanied the queen-to-be, Anne of Bohemia, on her trip to England.

Holland had a violent temper, which got him in trouble several times. The most famous incident occurred during Richard II's 1385 expedition to Scotland. An archer in the service of Ralph Stafford, eldest son of Hugh Stafford, 2nd Earl of Stafford, killed one of Holland's esquires. Stafford went to find Holland to apologize, but Holland killed him as soon as he identified himself. King Richard thereupon ordered the forfeiture of Holland's lands. The mother of both Holland and Richard II, Joan of Kent, died shortly afterwards, it was said of grief at the quarrel between her sons.

Early in 1386 Holland reconciled with the Staffords, and had his property restored. Later in 1386 he married Elizabeth of Lancaster, a daughter of John of Gaunt, 1st Duke of Lancaster (younger brother of the Black Prince), by his wife Blanche of Lancaster. He and Elizabeth then went on Gaunt's expedition to Spain, where Holland was appointed constable of the English army. After his return to England, on 2 June 1388 Holland was created Earl of Huntingdon, by an act of Parliament. In 1389 he was appointed Lord Great Chamberlain for life, Admiral of the Fleet in the Western Seas, and constable of Tintagel Castle in Cornwall. During this time he also received large grants of land from King Richard.

Over the next few years he held a number of additional offices: Constable of Conway Castle (1394); Governor of Carlisle Castle (1395); Warden (1398), later Constable-General, of the West Marches towards Scotland. His military service was interrupted by a pilgrimage to the Holy Land in 1394.

In 1397 Holland had marched with King Richard to arrest the latter's uncle Thomas of Woodstock, 1st Duke of Gloucester, and Richard Fitzalan, 11th Earl of Arundel, and later seized and held Arundel Castle at the king's request. As a reward, on 29 September 1397 he was created Duke of Exeter.

In 1399 he accompanied King Richard on his expedition to Ireland. Following their return the king sent him to try to negotiate with his own first cousin and Holland's brother-in-law Henry Bolingbroke, son of John of Gaunt. After Bolingbroke deposed Richard in 1399 and took the throne as King Henry IV (1399–1413), he called to account those who had been involved in the arrest and downfall of his uncle Thomas of Woodstock, and confiscated all rewards and titles received by them from King Richard. Thus Holland was stripped of his dukedom, becoming again merely Earl of Huntingdon.

Early in 1400 Holland entered into a conspiracy, known as the Epiphany Rising, with his nephew Thomas Holland, Earl of Kent, and with Thomas le Despencer, 1st Earl of Gloucester, and others. Their aim was to assassinate King Henry and his sons, and to return Richard, then in prison, to the throne. The plot failed and Holland fled, but was caught, near Pleshey Castle in Essex, and executed on 16 January 1400. Among those who witnessed the execution was Arundel's son, Thomas Fitzalan, 12th Earl of Arundel.

Holland's lands and titles were forfeited, but eventually they were restored to his second son John Holland, 2nd Duke of Exeter.

== Marriage and issue ==
In 1386, John married Elizabeth of Lancaster, a daughter of John of Gaunt, 1st Duke of Lancaster (younger brother of the Black Prince) by his wife Blanche of Lancaster, by whom he had children including:

=== Sons ===
- Richard Holland (died 3 September 1400), eldest son and heir, who survived his father only 7 months
- John Holland, 2nd Duke of Exeter, 2nd Earl of Huntingdon (1395–1447), second son, to whom was restored his father's dukedom in 1426. In the interim, the title had been bestowed upon Thomas Beaufort, who died childless in 1426.
- Sir Edward Holland (c. 1399 – after 1413)

=== Daughters ===
- Constance Holland (1387–1437), married first Thomas Mowbray, 4th Earl of Norfolk, married second Sir John Grey, KG
- Alice Holland (c. 1392 – c. 1406), married Richard de Vere, 11th Earl of Oxford

== Death ==
He was executed on 16 January 1400, following the failure of the Epiphany Rising conspiracy against King Henry IV.

His body was buried at the collegiate church in Pleshey. His tomb remained until the late 16th century, when, along with many other tombs in the church, it was broken up for use as building material. Only a fragment remained within the church by the start of the 17th century.

== Bibliography ==
- Allmand, Christopher (1992). Henry V. University of California Press.
- "Sir John Holland kills Lord Ralph Stafford". Froissart's Chronicles.
- Gervase, Mathew (1968). The court of Richard II. John Murray.
- Goodman, Anthony (1971). The Loyal Conspiracy:The Lords Appellant under Richard II. University of Miami Press.
- Hardy, W. H. (1891). "John Holand, duke of Exeter and earl of Huntingdon (1352?-1400)". Dictionary of National Biography. 27: 147–148.

Political offices
Preceded by The Duke of Ireland	Lord Great Chamberlain; 1389–1399?	Succeeded by The Earl of Oxford
Legal offices
Preceded by Unknown	Justice of Chester; 1381–1385	Succeeded by The Duke of York
Preceded by The Duke of Gloucester	Justice of Chester; 1391–1394	Succeeded by The Earl of Nottingham
Peerage of England
New creation	Duke of Exeter; 1397–1399	Vacant Forfeit Title next held by John Holland
New creation	Earl of Huntingdon; 1387–1400	Vacant Forfeit Title next held by John Holland
