= Robert Holland, 1st Baron Holand =

14th-century English nobleman

Robert de Holland, 1st Baron Holland
- Arms of Robert de Holland: Azure semée-de-lys argent, a lion rampant of the second
- Born: c. 1283; Lancashire
- Died: October 1328
- Buried: Lancashire
- Spouse: Maud la Zouche
- Father: Sir Robert de Holland
- Mother: Elizabeth de Samlesbury

Robert de Holland, 1st Baron Holand (c. 1283 – October 1328) was an English nobleman.

== Early life ==
Holland was a son of Sir Robert de Holland of Upholland, Lancashire, and Elizabeth, daughter of William de Samlesbury.

Holland was a favourite official of Thomas, 2nd Earl of Lancaster, and was knighted by 1305. He was appointed on 20 December 1307 in a matter concerning the Knight Templars, shortly before Edward II ordered their arrest and trials in January 1308. In October 1313 Holland was pardoned for his role in the death of Piers Gaveston. From 1314 to 1321 he was called to Parliament as a baron and was appointed as secretary to the Earl of Lancaster.

== Banastre Rebellion (1315) ==
Holland's favoured treatment by the powerful earl caused his rival knights in the area, led by Adam Banastre, Henry de Lea, and William de Bradshagh (Bradshaw), to start a campaign of violence towards him and the earl's other supporters known as the Banastre Rebellion. The rebels protested against the earl's actions and authority by attacking the homes of his supporters and several castles, including Liverpool Castle. Holland later assisted in the hunt for fugitives after the rebels had been routed in Preston by a force under the command of the Sheriff of Lancashire.

== Battle of Boroughbridge (1322) and Invasion of England (1326) ==
On 4 March 1322 Holland was ordered to join the king with horses and men to defend against Lancaster's rebellion. Twelve days later Holland betrayed the king and fought alongside Lancaster at the Battle of Boroughbridge.

After their defeat, Holland surrendered and was imprisoned and had his lands confiscated. He was released from prison but was accused of having joined with other rebels in raids on the estates of Hugh le Despenser, 1st Earl of Winchester, over the next few years. Holland was again imprisoned in Warwick Castle before being moved in 1326 to Northampton Castle from which he escaped.

== Demise ==
Following Queen Isabella and Roger Mortimer's overthrow of Edward II, Holland was pardoned for his escape from Northampton at the request of Henry de Beaumont; his lands were restored to him on 24 December 1327.

Holland still had enemies from the Banastre Rebellion though and in June 1328 they attempted to outlaw Holland for the deaths of Banastre and his followers, thirteen years after their deaths. Holland appealed against this but was killed in October in a wood near Henley-on-Thames, Oxfordshire. Thomas Wither is named by some as the murderer and is claimed to have been a supporter of the new Earl of Lancaster, Henry, but in light of Holland's outlawry in June may have been a supporter of Banastre as well. Holland was beheaded, his head sent to the Earl of Lancaster at Waltham Cross and his body to Preston, Lancashire where it was buried in the church of Grey Friars.

An Inquisition Post Mortem held in October 1328 found he held lands in Yorkshire, Derbyshire, Warwickshire, Leicestershire and London.

== Marriage and issue ==
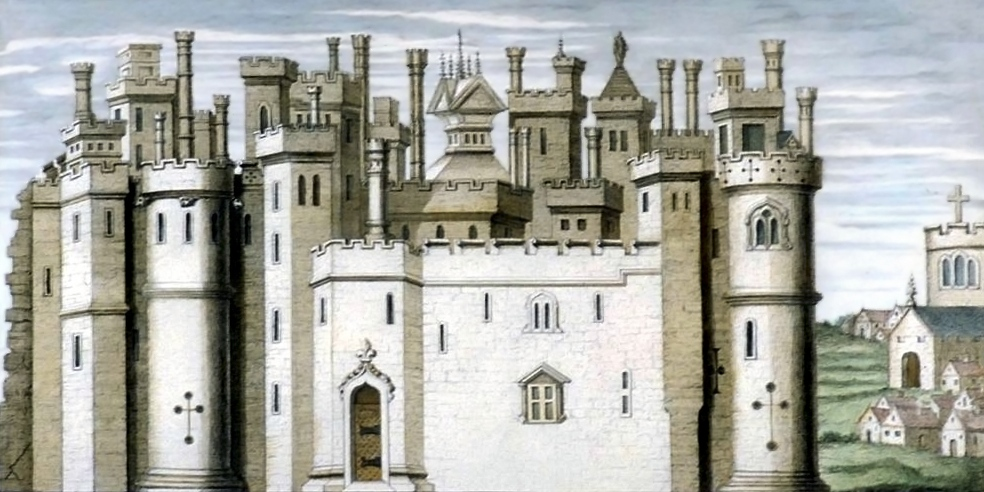
Melbourne Castle was started by de Holland in Melbourne, Derbyshire.

Holland married before 1309/10 (being contracted to marry in or before 1305/6) Maud la Zouche, daughter and co-heiress of Alan la Zouche, 1st Baron la Zouche of Ashby, by his wife, Eleanor de Segrave. Holland and Maud had nine children:

- Robert de Holand (born c. 1311–12 [aged 16 in 1328, aged 30 and more in 1349] – died 16 March 1372/3), 2nd Baron Holand. He married before 25 June 1343 (date of fine) Margaret Hetton, who married Sir William Molineux of Sefton secondly.
- Thomas Holland, 1st Earl of Kent, KG (died 26 or 28 December 1360), of Broughton, Buckinghamshire, Hawes (in Brackley), Brackley and King's Sutton, Northamptonshire, Horden, Durham, etc., created Earl of Kent in 1360. He married Joan Plantagenet, the "Fair Maid of Kent", daughter of Edmund of Woodstock, 1st Earl of Kent, a son of King Edward I by his second wife Margaret of France, daughter of Philip III of France.
- Sir Otho Holand, KG (died 3 September 1359), of Ashford, Chesterfield, and Dalbury, Derbyshire, Yoxall, Staffordshire, Talworth (in Long Ditton), Surrey, etc., Governor of the Channel Islands, 1359. He married Joan _____.
- Alan de Holand, of Great Houghton, Yorkshire, living 13 October 1331 (date of fine). He was killed sometime before 30 October 1339 by William Bate, of Dunham-on-Trent, Nottinghamshire.
- Isabel de Holand. Mistress of John de Warenne, 7th Earl of Surrey.
- Margaret de Holand (died 20 or 22 August 1349). She married John la Warre (see chart Margaret d 1349)
- Maud de Holand (living 1342). She married (1st) John de Mowbray, 3rd Baron Mowbray; (2nd) Thomas de Swinnerton, 3rd Lord Swinnerton.
- Elizabeth de Holand (died 13 July 1387). She married Henry Fitz Roger, of Chewton, Somerset, descendant of Herbert of Winchester.
- Eleanor de Holand (died before 21 Nov. 1341). She married John Darcy, 2nd Lord Darcy of Knaith.

The Holland Earls of Kent. Where an article exists, it can be found by clicking on the name.

== Sources ==
- Calendar of Inquisitions Post Mortem. Vol. VII. London: HMSO. 1909.
- Holland, Edgar (1902). A History of the Family of Holland of Mobberley and Knutsford. Edinburgh: Ballantyne Press.
- Moor, Charles (1929). The Knights of Edward I. London: Harleian Society.
- Close Rolls. Westminster: Parliament of England. 1224–1468.
- Patent Rolls. Westminster: Parliament of England. 1232–1509.
- Parliamentary Writs Alphabetical Digest. Vol. II. London: Public Record Office. 1834.
