= Thomas Holland, 1st Earl of Kent =

English nobleman and military commander

Thomas Holland
- Earl of Kent
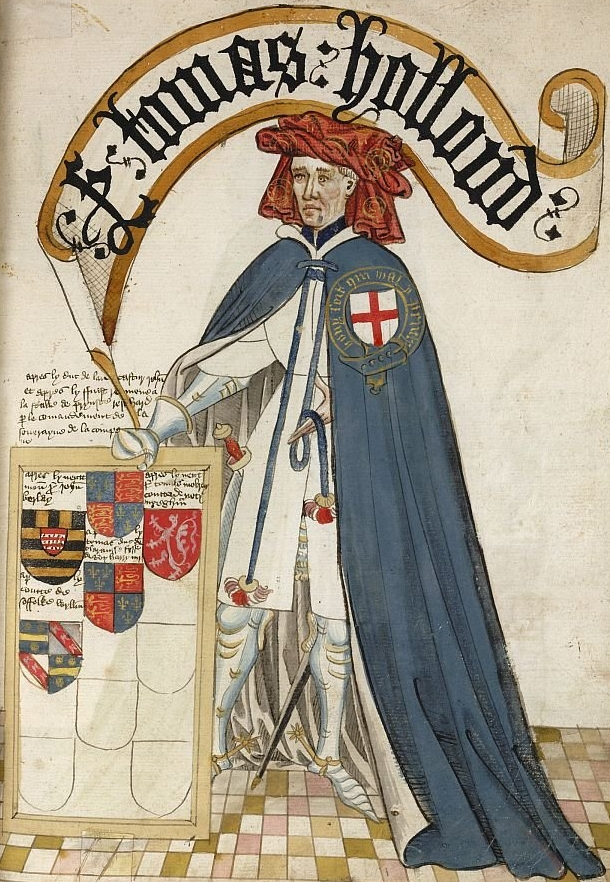
- Born: c. 1314
- Died: 28 December 1360 (aged around 46)
- Spouse: Joan of Kent
- Issue: Thomas Holland, 2nd Earl of Kent; John Holland, 1st Duke of Exeter; Joan, Duchess of Brittany; Maud, Countess of Ligny
- Father: Robert de Holland, 1st Baron Holand
- Mother: Maud la Zouche

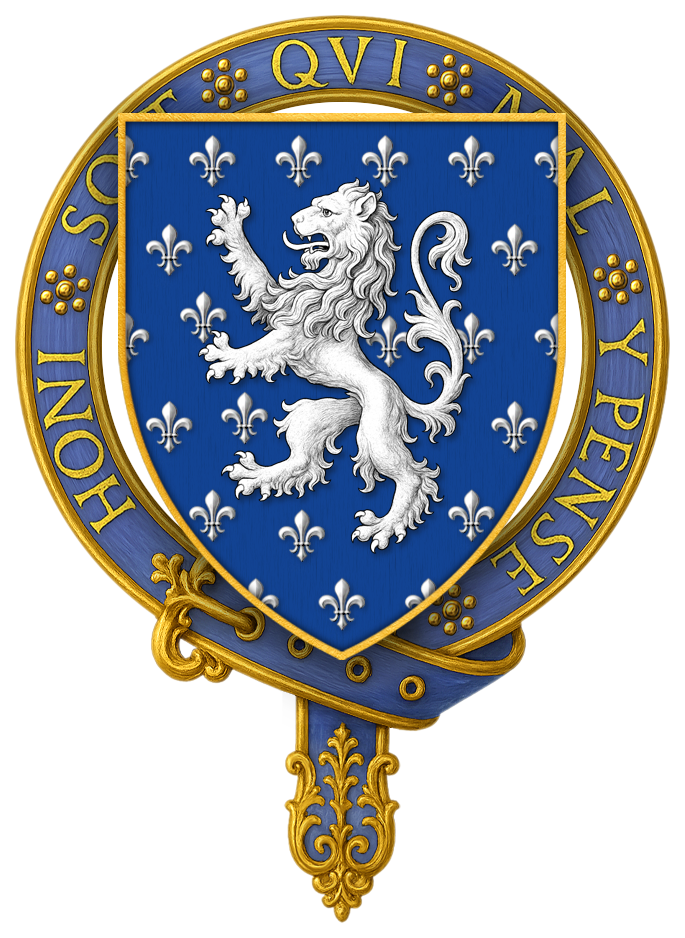
Arms of Sir Thomas Holland, KG

Thomas Holland, 2nd Baron Holand, and jure uxoris 1st Earl of Kent, KG (c. 1314 – 28 December 1360) was an English nobleman and military commander during the Hundred Years' War. By the time of the Crécy campaign, he had apparently lost one of his eyes.

== Early life ==
He was from a gentry family in Upholland, Lancashire. Thomas was a son of Robert de Holland, 1st Baron Holand and Maud la Zouche. One of his brothers was Otho Holand, who was also made a Knight of the Garter.

== Military career ==
In his early military career, he fought in Flanders. He was engaged, in 1340, in the English expedition into Flanders and sent, two years later, with Sir John D'Artevelle to Bayonne, to defend the Gascon frontier against the French. In 1343, he was again on service in France.

In 1346, he attended King Edward III into Normandy in the immediate retinue of the Earl of Warwick; and, at the taking of Caen, the Count of Eu and Guînes, Constable of France, and the Count De Tancarville surrendered themselves to him as prisoners.

According to chronicler Jean le Bel, they recognized Sir Thomas and his knights from earlier military campaigns on the continent during which they had traveled and fought side by side. Allegedly they shouted to him and his companions from the gatehouse window: "Ah! In God's name, sir knights, come up here and save us from those pitiless men who'll kill us like all the others if they catch us!"

After securing the prisoners, Sir Thomas and the remainder of his retinue then allegedly returned to the fray, attempting to prevent further violence and protect the women and girls of the captured town.

This latter incident is remarkable, being one of the very few recorded instances of true mercy (as opposed to the ransom-motivated sparing of prisoners) shown to any of the inhabitants during the otherwise luridly barbaric sacking of Caen, during which many women and girls were raped and an estimated 5,000 French were killed, the vast majority civilians. It is unrecorded, however, to what extent Sir Thomas and his men were successful.

During the long journey of the English forces through the French countryside in the summer of 1346, Sir Thomas is recorded as having at one point ridden up to a bridge the French had broken at Elbeuf, killing two enemy soldiers and crying: "St. George for Edward!"

At the Battle of Crécy, Sir Thomas was one of the principal commanders in the vanguard under the Prince of Wales and he, afterwards, served at the Siege of Calais in 1346–47. In 1348, he was invested as one of the founders and 13th Knight of the new Order of the Garter.

Around the same time as, or before, his first expedition, he secretly married the 12-year-old Joan of Kent, daughter of Edmund of Woodstock, 1st Earl of Kent (son of Edward I and Margaret of France) and Margaret Wake. However, during his absence on foreign service, Joan, under pressure from her family, contracted another marriage with William Montacute, 2nd Earl of Salisbury (of whose household Holland had been seneschal). This second marriage was annulled in 1349, when Joan's previous marriage with Holland was proved to the satisfaction of the papal commissioners. Joan was ordered by the Pope to return to her husband and live with him as his lawful wife, which she did, and had 5 children by him.

Between 1353 and 1356, he was summoned to Parliament as Baron de Holland. His brother-in-law, John, Earl of Kent, died in 1352, and Holland became Earl of Kent in right of his wife, although it was in 1360 that he was summoned to Parliament with that title.

In 1354, Holland was the king's lieutenant in Brittany during the minority of the Duke of Brittany, and in 1359 co-captain-general for all the English continental possessions.

Holland died of illness in Normandy on 28 December 1360. He was succeeded as baron by his son Thomas, the earldom still being held by his wife (though the son later became Earl in his own right). Another son, John, became Earl of Huntingdon and Duke of Exeter.

== Children ==
Thomas and Joan of Kent had:

- Thomas Holland, 2nd Earl of Kent
- John Holland, 1st Duke of Exeter
- Joan Holland, who married John IV, Duke of Brittany
- Maud Holland, married firstly Hugh Courtenay, and secondly Waleran III of Luxembourg, Count of Ligny
- Edmund Holland (c. 1354), who died young

== Sources ==
- Gervase, Mathew (1968). The court of Richard II. John Murray.
- Walsingham, Thomas (2005). The Chronica Maiora of Thomas Walsingham, 1376-1422. Translated by Preest, David. The Boydell Press.

Peerage of England
New creation	Earl of Kent; 1360	Succeeded by Thomas Holland
New creation	Baron Holand; 1353–1360	Succeeded by Thomas Holland
