= Joan of Kent =

Princess of Wales (c. 1328–1385)

- 4th Countess of Kent suo jure 5th Baroness Wake of Liddell; Princess of Wales and Aquitaine
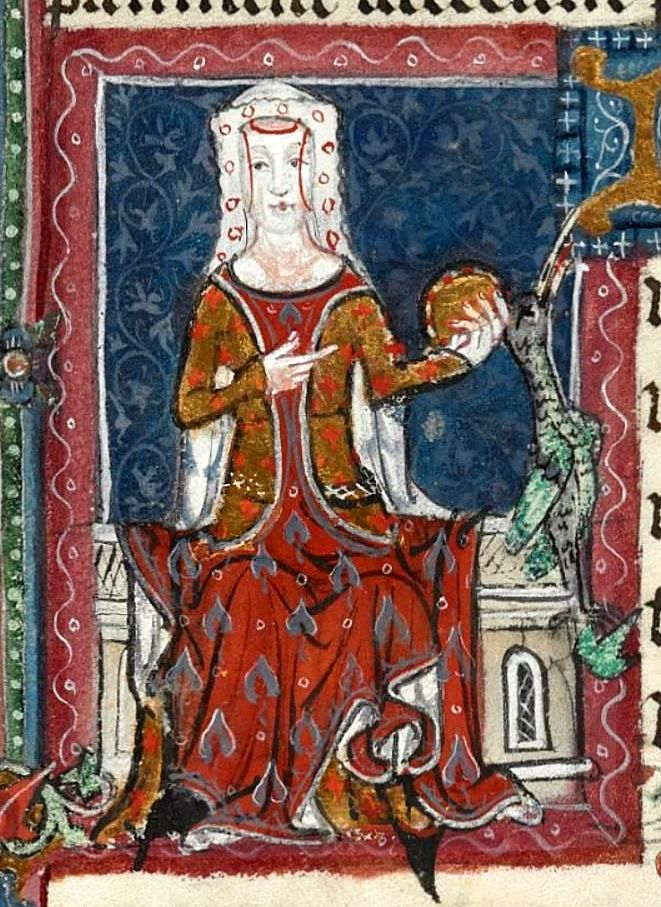
- Illustration of Joan in The Benefactors' Book of St Albans Abbey
- Born: c. 1328; Woodstock Palace, Oxfordshire, England
- Died: August 1385 (aged about 56); Wallingford Castle, Berkshire (present-day Oxfordshire), England
- Burial: 27 January 1386; Greyfriars, Stamford, Lincolnshire, England
- Spouse: Thomas Holland, 1st Earl of Kent (m. 1340; died 1360): William Montagu, 2nd Earl of Salisbury (m. 1340/41; ann. 1349); Edward the Black Prince (m. 1361; ann. 1361) (m. 1361; died 1376)
- Issue among others: Thomas Holland, 2nd Earl of Kent; John Holland, 1st Duke of Exeter; Joan Holland, Duchess of Brittany; Maud Holland, Countess of Ligny; Edward of Angoulême; Richard II of England
- House: Plantagenet
- Father: Edmund of Woodstock, 1st Earl of Kent
- Mother: Margaret Wake, 3rd Baroness Wake of Liddell

Joan, Countess of Kent suo jure (c. 1328 – August 1385), also known as the "Fair Maid of Kent", was the mother of King Richard II of England, her son by her third husband, Edward the Black Prince, the eldest son and heir apparent of King Edward III. The French chronicler Jean Froissart described her as 'in her time the most beautiful woman in all the realm of England, and the most loved', and, Chandos Herald wrote that she was 'beautiful, pleasant and wise'. After the death of her brother John, 3rd Earl of Kent, in 1352, Joan inherited the titles 4th Countess of Kent and 5th Baroness Wake of Liddell. She was made a Lady of the Garter in 1378.

== Early life ==
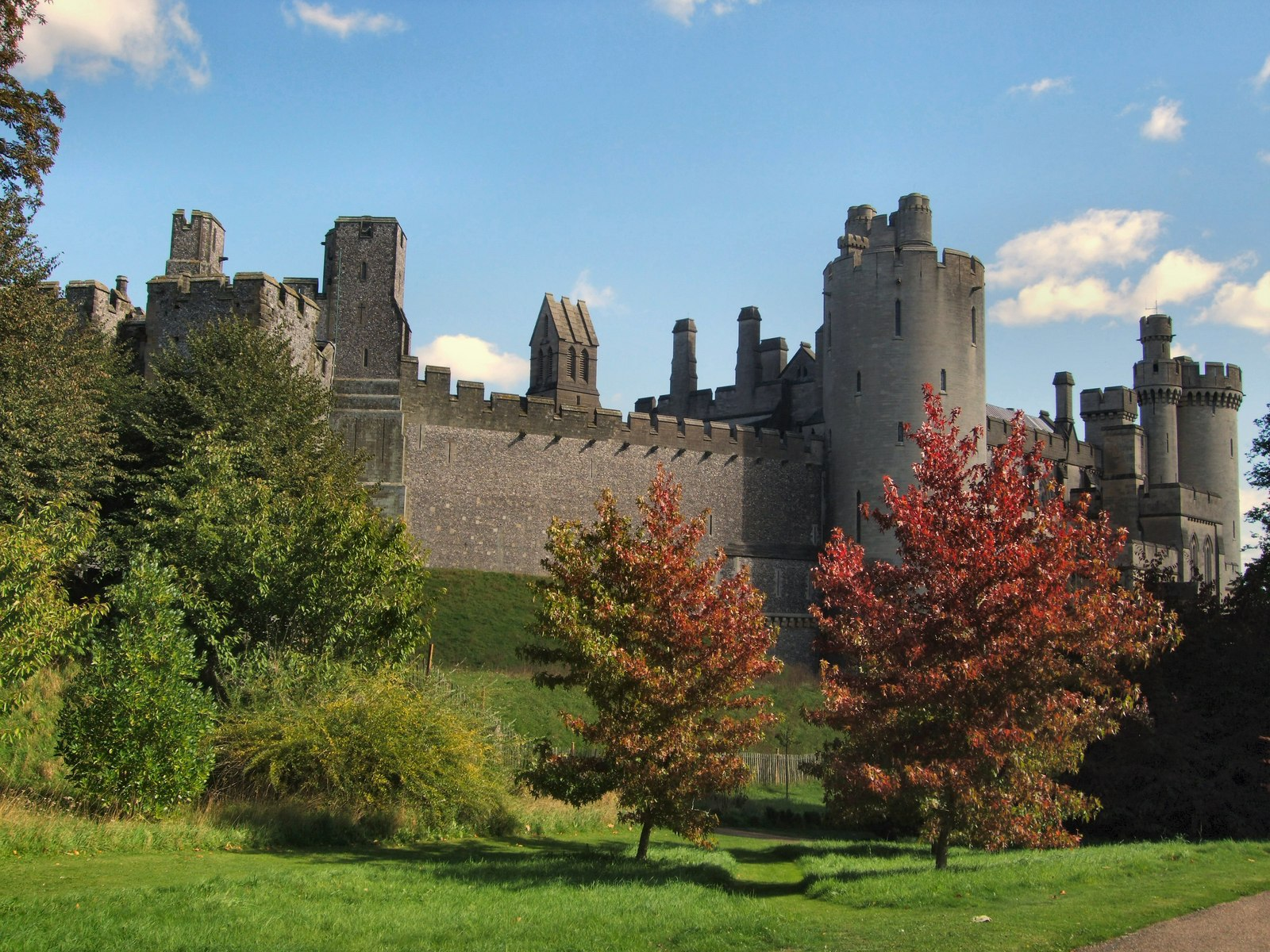
Arundel Castle in Sussex, where Joan, her mother and siblings were placed under house arrest

Joan was born in around 1328 at Woodstock Palace. She was the daughter of Edmund of Woodstock, 1st Earl of Kent, by his wife, Margaret Wake, 3rd Baroness Wake of Liddell. Edmund was the sixth son of King Edward I of England, and his second son by his second wife, Margaret of France, daughter of King Philip III of France. Edmund was always a loyal supporter of his eldest half-brother, King Edward II, which placed him in conflict with that monarch's wife, Queen Isabella of France, and her lover Roger Mortimer, 1st Earl of March. Edmund was executed in 1330 after Edward II was deposed, and Edmund's widow and four children (including Joan, who was only two years old at the time) were placed under house arrest in Arundel Castle in Sussex, which had been granted to Edmund in 1326 by his half-brother the king following the execution of the rebel Edmund FitzAlan, 9th Earl of Arundel. It was a time of great strain for the widowed Countess of Kent and her four children. They received respite after the new king, Edward III (Joan's half-first cousin), reached adulthood and took charge of affairs. He took on the responsibility for the family and looked after them well.

== Early marriages ==
Arms of Holland of Upholland: Azure semée-de-lys argent, a lion rampant of the second. Joan's descendants by her husband Thomas Holland were granted in lieu of their paternal arms the royal arms of her father Edmund of Woodstock, 1st Earl of Kent, a difference of the arms of King Edward I.

In 1340, at the age of about twelve, Joan secretly married 26-year-old Thomas Holland of Up Holland, Lancashire, without first gaining the royal consent necessary for couples of their rank. Shortly after the wedding, Holland left for the continent as part of the English expedition into Flanders and France. The following winter (1340 or 1341), while Holland was overseas, Joan's family arranged for her to marry William Montagu, son and heir of William Montagu, 1st Earl of Salisbury. It is not known if Joan confided in anyone about her first marriage before marrying Montagu, who was her own age. Later, Joan indicated that she had not announced her existing marriage with Thomas Holland because she was afraid it would lead to Holland's execution for treason. She may also have been influenced to believe that the earlier marriage was invalid. Montagu's father died in 1344, and he became the 2nd Earl of Salisbury.

When Holland returned from the French campaigns in about 1348, his marriage to Joan was revealed. Holland confessed the secret marriage to the king and appealed to the Pope for the return of his wife. Salisbury held Joan captive so that she could not testify until the Church ordered him to release her. In 1349, the proceedings ruled in Holland's favour. Pope Clement VI annulled Joan's marriage to Salisbury and Joan and Thomas Holland were ordered to be married in the Church.

Over the next eleven years, Thomas Holland, 1st Earl of Kent jure uxoris and Joan had five children:

Arms of Thomas Holland, 2nd Earl of Kent: Arms of Edmund of Woodstock, 1st Earl of Kent, being the arms of his maternal grandfather which he was granted in lieu of his paternal arms

1. Thomas Holland, 2nd Earl of Kent (1350 – 25 April 1397), who married Lady Alice FitzAlan (c. 1350 – 17 March 1416), daughter of Richard FitzAlan, 10th Earl of Arundel and 8th Earl of Surrey, and Lady Eleanor of Lancaster.
2. John Holland, 1st Duke of Exeter and 1st Earl of Huntingdon (c. 1352 – 16 January 1400), who married Lady Elizabeth of Lancaster (c. 1363 – 24 November 1426), daughter of John of Gaunt, 1st Duke of Lancaster, and Lady Blanche of Lancaster.
3. Lady Joan Holland (1356 – October 1384), who married John IV, Duke of Brittany (1339 – 1 November 1399).
4. Lady Maud Holland (1359 – 13 April 1392), who married, firstly, Hugh Courtenay (c. 1345 – 20 February 1374), heir apparent to the earldom of Devon, and, secondly, Waleran III of Luxembourg, Count of Ligny and Saint-Pol (1355 – 12 April 1415).
5. Edmund Holland (c. 1354), who died young. He was buried in the church of Austin Friars, London.

When the last of Joan's siblings died in 1352, the lands and titles of her parents devolved upon her, and she became the 4th Countess of Kent and 5th Baroness Wake of Liddell. Her husband Holland was created Earl of Kent in right of his wife in 1360.

== Marriage to the Black Prince ==
The death of Joan's first husband, Thomas Holland, in 1360 made her an attractive marriage prospect for Edward, the Black Prince, the son of her half-first cousin King Edward III. Some may infer that evidence of a long-held desire by Edward for Joan may be found in the record of his presenting her with a silver cup, part of the booty from one of his early military campaigns. Although one generation removed from her, he was only few years younger than her.

Joan and Edward married in secret in spring of 1361, without informing the King nor obtaining a dispensation from Church, which was expected as they were closely related and Edward was additionally godfather to her son Thomas Holland. It is presumed the marriage was a love match, as the Prince acted without his father's approval and Joan was a widow in relatively advanced age, that did not make her ideal candidate for a mother of next heir.

It is suggested that Edward's parents did not favour a marriage between their son and their former ward; nevertheless, King Edward assisted his son in acquiring all four of the needed dispensations for Edward to marry Joan. Among the problems was Edward and Joan's birth placement within the prohibited degrees of consanguinity. Queen Philippa (wife of Edward III) had made a favourite of Joan in her childhood. Both she and the king may have been concerned about the legitimacy of any resulting children, considering Joan's complicated marital record, but such concerns were remedied by a second ruling of Pope Clement's successor Innocent VI that upheld the initial ruling on Joan's previous marriage attempts. At the king's request, the Pope granted the four dispensations needed to allow the two to be legally married. Joan and Edward's spring marriage was annulled, and the couple held a second wedding, this time official, on 10 October 1361 at Windsor Castle, with the king and queen in attendance. The Archbishop of Canterbury officiated.

In 1362, the Black Prince was invested as Prince of Aquitaine, a region of France that had belonged to the English Crown since the marriage of Eleanor of Aquitaine to Henry II of England in 1152. He and Joan moved to Bordeaux, the capital of the principality, where they spent the next nine years. Two sons were born during this period to the royal couple. The elder son, Edward of Angoulême (1365–1370), died at the age of five. Their younger son, the future King Richard II, was born on 6 January 1367; according to chronicler Chandos Herald the labour was premature due to Joan's distress after the Black Prince left her side to fight in Spanish war. He was lured into a battle on behalf of King Peter of Castile and achieved one of his greatest victories. King Peter, however, was later killed, and there was no money to pay the troops. In the meantime, Joan was forced to raise another army as her husband's enemies were threatening Aquitaine in his absence.

== Transition to Dowager Princess of Wales ==
By 1371, the Black Prince was no longer able to perform his duties as Prince of Aquitaine due to poor health, thus he and Joan returned to England shortly after burying their elder son. In 1372, the Black Prince forced himself to attempt one final, abortive campaign in the hope of saving his father's French possessions, but the exertion completely shattered his health. He returned to England for the last time on 7 June 1376, aged 45, and died in his bed at the Palace of Westminster the next day.

Joan's son Prince Richard was now next in line to succeed his grandfather Edward III, who died on 21 June 1377. Richard was crowned as Richard II the following month at the age of 10. Early in his reign, the young King faced the challenge of the Peasants' Revolt. The Lollards, religious reformers led by John Wyclif, had enjoyed Joan's support, but the violent climax of the popular movement for reform reduced the feisty Joan to a state of terror, while leaving the king with an improved reputation.

As the king's mother, Joan exercised much influence behind the scenes and was recognised for her contributions during the early years of her son's reign. She also enjoyed a certain respect among the people as a venerable royal dowager. For example, on her return to London from a pilgrimage to Thomas Becket's shrine at Canterbury Cathedral in 1381, she found her way barred by Wat Tyler and his mob of rebels on Blackheath. Not only was she let through unharmed, but she was saluted with kisses and provided with an escort for the rest of her journey.

In January 1382, Richard II married Anne of Bohemia, daughter of Charles IV, Holy Roman Emperor and King of Bohemia.

== Death and burial ==
John Holland, 1st Duke of Exeter, was Joan's son by her first marriage. In 1385, while campaigning with his half-brother King Richard II in the Kingdom of Scotland, John Holland became involved in a quarrel with Sir Ralph Stafford, son of the 2nd Earl of Stafford, a favourite of Queen Anne of Bohemia. Stafford was killed and John Holland sought sanctuary at the shrine of St John of Beverley. On the king's return, Holland was condemned to death. Joan pleaded with her royal son for four days to spare his half-brother. Aware that she was dying Joan wrote her will on 7 August 1385 and died either the following day, 8 August 1385, or on 14 August probably at Wallingford Castle. King Richard then relented and pardoned Holland, who was sent on a pilgrimage to the Holy Land.

Joan was buried beside Thomas Holland her first husband, at the Greyfriars in Stamford, Lincolnshire, as she had requested in her will. Her third husband, Edward the Black Prince had planned that he and Joan would be buried in the Black Prince Chantry in the crypt of Canterbury Cathedral, where there is a ceiling boss sculpted with likenesses of her face. However, due to his status Edward's last resting place was in the Trinity Chapel of Canterbury Cathedral.

== Family tree ==
Edward I of England
Edward II of England
Margaret Wake, 3rd Baroness Wake | Edmund of Woodstock, 1st Earl of Kent of the fifth creation | Edward III of England
Thomas Holland, 1st Earl of Kent of the sixth creation | Joan, 4th Countess of Kent of the fifth creation | Edward the Black Prince
Thomas Holland, 2nd Earl of Kent | John Holland, 1st Duke of Exeter | Richard II of England

== Bibliography ==
- Barber, Richard (2004). "Joan, suo jure countess of Kent, and princess of Wales". Oxford Dictionary of National Biography (online) (online ed.). Oxford University Press. doi:10.1093/ref:odnb/14823. (Subscription, Wikipedia Library access or UK public library membership required.)
- Goodman, Anthony (2017). Joan, the Fair Maid of Kent: A Fourteenth-Century Princess and her World, The Boydell Press, Woodbridge ISBN 978 1 78327 176 4
- Lawne, Penny (2015). Joan of Kent: The First Princess of Wales, Amberley Publishing, Gloucestershire
- Stamp, A.E.; Salisbury, E.; Atkinson, E.G. & O'Reilly, J.J. (1921). Calendar of Inquisitions Post Mortem, volume 10: Edward III, 1352–1361. London: His Majesty's Stationery Office. hdl:2027/umn.31951t001412556. ISBN 9781843834793.
- Tait, James (1892). "Joan (1328-1385)" . In Lee, Sidney (ed.). Dictionary of National Biography. Vol. 29. London: Smith, Elder & Co. pp. 392–393.
- Cussans, Thomas. The Times Kings & Queens of The British Isles (page 92); ISBN 0-00-714195-5
- Wentersdorf, Karl P. (1979). "The clandestine marriages of the Fair Maid of Kent". Journal of Medieval History. 5 (3): 203–231. doi:10.1016/0304-4181(79)90037-X.
- Shaw, Amy (2002). Joan of Kent: Life and Legends. The Ohio State University.

Peerage of England
| Preceded by John | Countess of Kent; 1352–1385 | Succeeded by Thomas Holland |
