= Sir Edward de Courtenay =

Sir Edward Courtenay
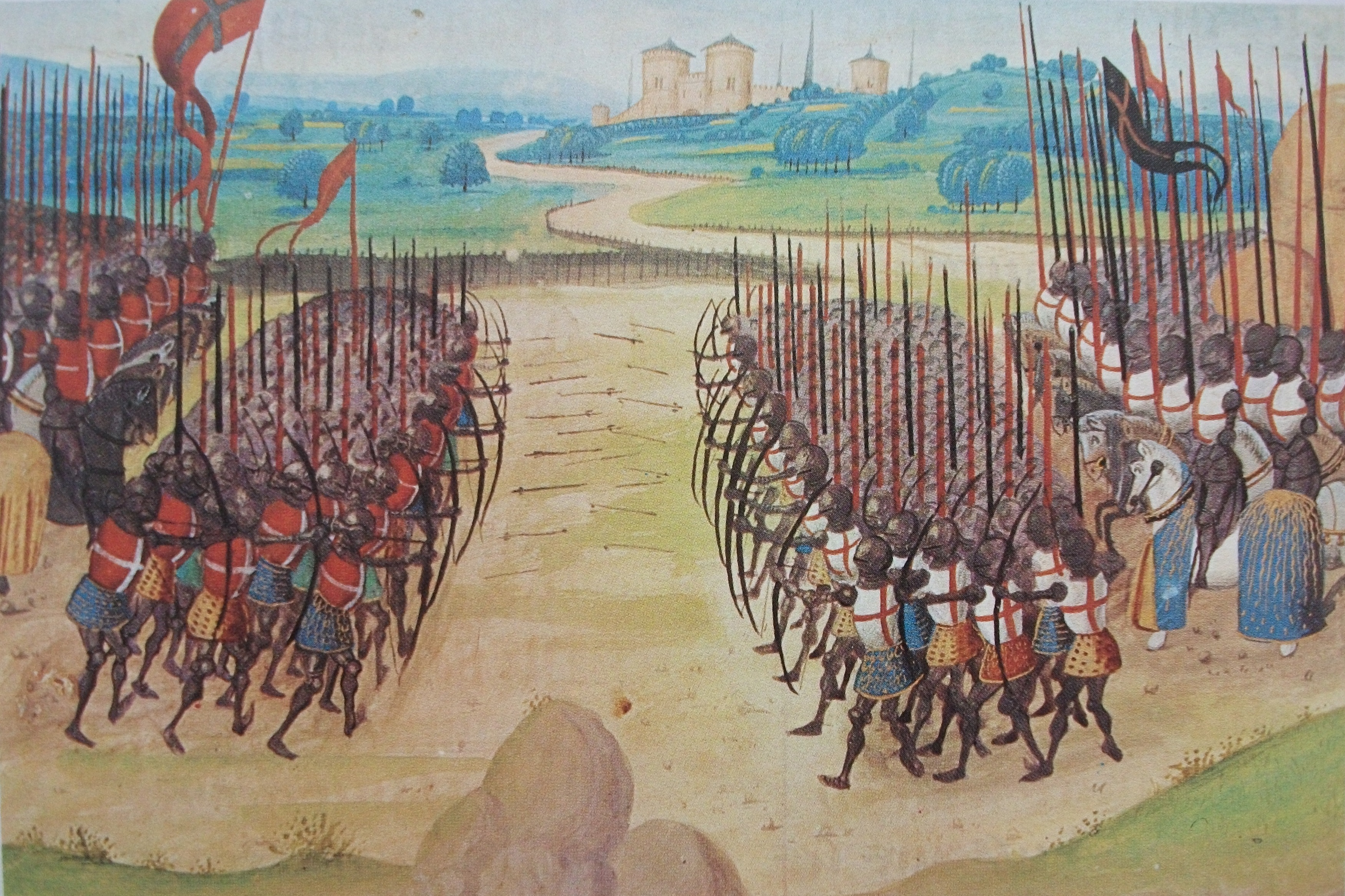
- Battle of Agincourt, 15th century miniature
- Born: c. 1385
- Died: c. August 1418
- Noble family: Courtenay
- Spouse: Eleanor Mortimer
- Father: Edward de Courtenay, 11th Earl of Devon
- Mother: Maud Camoys

Sir Edward Courtenay (c.1385 – c. August 1418) was the eldest son of Edward de Courtenay, 11th Earl of Devon (d. 5 December 1419). He fought at Agincourt, and was killed in a sea battle in Henry V's continuing campaigns in Normandy.

== Family ==
Born about 1385, Sir Edward Courtenay was the eldest son and heir of Edward Courtenay, 11th Earl of Devon (d. 5 December 1419), and Maud Camoys, the daughter of Sir John de Camoys of Gressenhall, Norfolk by his second wife, Elizabeth le Latimer, the daughter of William le Latimer, 3rd Lord Latimer. Courtenay had two younger brothers, Hugh Courtenay, 12th Earl of Devon, and James Courtenay, and a sister, Elizabeth Courtenay, who had issue by her first marriage to John Harington, 4th Baron Harington (d. 11 February 1418), and no issue by her second marriage to William Bonville, 1st Baron Bonville (d. 18 February 1461).

Before 20 November 1409 Courtenay married Eleanor Mortimer, daughter of Roger de Mortimer, 4th Earl of March, and Eleanor Holland. Courtenay's sister-in-law, Anne Mortimer, was born at New Forest, Westmeath, one of the Mortimer estates in Ireland, and it is likely Eleanor Mortimer was born there as well. She was sister of Edmund Mortimer, 5th Earl of March, Because King Richard II of England had no issue, Eleanor's father, Roger Mortimer, 4th Earl of March, as maternal grandson of Richard's brother Lionel of Antwerp, 1st Duke of Clarence, was heir presumptive during his lifetime, and at his death in Ireland on 20 July 1398 his claim to the crown passed to his eldest son, Eleanor's brother Edmund Mortimer, 5th Earl of March.

On 30 September 1399, the fortunes of Eleanor Mortimer and her brothers and sister changed entirely. Richard II was deposed by the Lancastrians led by Henry Bolingbroke, who became King Henry IV and had his own son, the future King Henry V, recognized as heir apparent at his first Parliament. Eleanor's brothers, Edmund and Roger, were kept in custody by the new King at Windsor and Berkhampstead castles, but were treated honourably, and for part of the time brought up with the King's own children, John and Philippa.

According to Griffiths, Eleanor and her sister, Anne, who were in the care of their mother until her death in 1405, were not well treated by Henry IV, and were described as 'destitute' after her death.

== Career ==
Although his family had risen to the heights of power as advisers to King Richard II, after Richard's deposition in 1399 Courtenay threw in his lot with the new King, Henry IV, and was knighted on 13 October 1399 at the King's coronation in Westminster Abbey. However his future with the new Lancastrian monarchy was rendered uncertain because of his affinity with the Mortimers.

At Henry IV's death Courtenay was appointed Warden of the King's Forests in Devon and Cornwall, and was summoned by the new King, Henry V, to attend Parliament.

In 1415 he was required to answer charges that he was in league with his brother-in-law, Richard, Earl of Cambridge, in the Southampton Plot to assassinate Henry V as the army awaited embarkation for the invasion of France at Southampton. Implicated by kinship, Courtenay came clean and pledged allegiance by joining the army. He was appointed to the commission which tried the conspirators and condemned them to death.

Henry V's campaign in France began with sea battles along the Normandy coast, and Courtenay attacked the entrance to the Seine. Joining the King for the march eastwards across northern France, he fought in the King's guard at Agincourt.

He was appointed Keeper of the New Forest on 20 November 1415. Henry V's continuing campaigns in France required reliable sea captains, and Courtenay was appointed Admiral of the Fleet briefly from May to August 1418. He was killed during a particularly vicious sea fight. Courtenay died in August 1418 or shortly thereafter. He left no issue.
