= John Harpeden (died 1438) =

English knight (died 1438)

Sketch of Harpeden's brass.

Sir John Harpeden (Note: Also John Harpedon or John Harpenden.) (died 8 May 1438) was an English knight. Little is known of him—he was never summoned to Parliament—but he was related to the Mortimers.

Arms of John Harpeden: Argent, a mullet of six points pierced and charged in the centre with a marlet gules.

== Life ==
Harpeden spent his early years in the entourage of John Cornwall, Baron Fanhope. In 1415 and again in 1416 he was granted letters of protection, he then being in France in the retinue of Cornwall, fighting at the Battle of Agincourt in 1415. During July 1417, John and Cornwall were contracted to raise 53 lances and 121 archers for the army being mustered for King Henry V of England’s expedition to France. In March 1418 he was granted the castle and lordship of Chanteloup and the manors of Appily and Créances within the counties of Coutances and Avranches in Normandy. After Harpeden was declared a rebel in September 1420, these lands were re-granted to John de Grey, Lord Gray. In 1422 he obtained a general pardon and also was given a license to cross over from France to England with the body of Dame Eleanor de Courtenay for interment.

Historically Harpeden's death has often been mistakenly dated to 1457, but it took place on 8 May 1438. He does not appear to have been of advanced age. He was buried in St. John the Evangelist’s chapel Westminster Abbey and his monumental brass is still located there in the north ambulatory of the choir, after being relocated in 1772. His second wife Joan's monumental brass is in Cobham church. Harpeden's excellent brass shows him in very simple plate armour surrounded by the shields impaling his arms, with those of his three wives and the last shows his arms.

== Marriages ==
His first marriage is considered to be to Eleanor (died 1422), widow of Edward de Courtenay, daughter of Roger de Mortimer, Earl of March and Ulster and Eleanor Holland. John's second marriage, was the fifth and last husband of Joan (died 13 January 1433), heiress of the Cobham barony in Kent. Joan was the only child of John de la Pole and Joan, heiress of John Cobham and Margaret Courtenay. Joan was the widow of Robert Hemendale, Reginald Braybrooke, Nicholas Hawberk and John Oldcastle. She had children by all of them, however none by Harpeden. His third marriage was to Elizabeth (died 1453), daughter of Reginald Cobham, 3rd Baron Sterborough.
