= The King (2019 film) =

Epic film by David Michôd

- Release poster
- Directed by: David Michôd
- Written by: David Michôd; Joel Edgerton
- Based on: Henry IV, Part 1, Henry IV, Part 2 and Henry V by William Shakespeare
- Produced by: Brad Pitt; Dede Gardner; Jeremy Kleiner; Liz Watts; David Michôd; Joel Edgerton
- Starring: Timothée Chalamet; Joel Edgerton; Sean Harris; Tom Glynn-Carney; Lily-Rose Depp; Thomasin McKenzie; Robert Pattinson; Ben Mendelsohn
- Cinematography: Adam Arkapaw
- Edited by: Peter Sciberras
- Music by: Nicholas Britell
- Production companies: Plan B Entertainment; Blue-Tongue Films; Porchlight Films
- Distributed by: Netflix
- Release dates: 2 September 2019 (Venice); 11 October 2019 (United States)
- Running time: 140 minutes
- Countries: Australia; United States
- Languages: English; French

The King is a 2019 epic historical drama film directed by David Michôd, based on several plays from William Shakespeare's Henriad. The screenplay was written by Michôd and Joel Edgerton, who both produced the film with Brad Pitt, Dede Gardner, Jeremy Kleiner, and Liz Watts. The King includes an ensemble cast led by Timothée Chalamet as the Prince of Wales and later King Henry V of England, alongside Joel Edgerton, Sean Harris, Lily-Rose Depp, Robert Pattinson, and Ben Mendelsohn.

The film focuses on the rise of Henry V as king after his father dies as he also must navigate palace politics, the war his father left behind, and the emotional strings of his past life. The King premiered at the 76th Venice International Film Festival on 2 September 2019, and was released digitally via Netflix on 11 October 2019. The film received favourable reviews from film critics but, despite being presented as an adaptation of Shakespeare's Henriad rather than as a historical documentary film, was criticised by historians for historical inaccuracies and for deviating from the original plays.

== Plot ==
After a battle with the Scots, King Henry IV meets with those who fought. Hotspur is angry and insulting towards the king.

England's Prince Henry ("Hal") spends his days drinking, whoring, and jesting with his companion Falstaff in Eastcheap.

His father King Henry IV grows tired of Hal's debauchery and announces that Hal's younger brother Prince Thomas will inherit the throne. King Henry IV sends Thomas to subdue Hotspur's rebellion. However, Hal arrives and challenges Hotspur to single combat, which Hal wins, ending the battle without further conflict.

Thomas dies shortly after while campaigning against the rebels in Wales. When King Henry IV dies, Hal is anointed as King Henry V. He opts for peace and conciliation with his father's many adversaries, despite his actions being seen as weakness.

At King Henry V's coronation feast, envoys from the Dauphin of France present Hal with a tennis ball as an insulting coronation gift. However, King Henry V frames this as a positive reflection of his boyhood. His sister Philippa, now the Queen of Denmark, cautions her brother that nobles in any royal court have their own interests in mind and will never fully reveal their true intentions.

King Henry V interrogates a captured assassin who claims to have been sent to kill him by King Charles VI of France. French agents approach the English nobles Cambridge and Grey. The traitors plot against Hal and unsuccessfully attempt to win over the Chief Justice, Gascoigne. Gascoigne advises Hal that a show of strength is necessary to unite England, so Hal declares war on France and has Cambridge and Grey beheaded. He approaches Falstaff and appoints him as his chief military strategist, saying that Falstaff is the only man he truly trusts.

The English army sets sail for France. After completing the Siege of Harfleur, they receive taunting messages from the Dauphin. The English advance parties stumble upon a vast French army gathering to face them. Dorset advises Hal to retreat, but Falstaff proposes using infantry without armor to attack the armored French cavalry, who would get weighed down and stuck in the mud.

Hal challenges the Dauphin to single combat to minimize bloodshed, but the Dauphin refuses. Falstaff's plan succeeds, and the outnumbered English army defeats the French, although Falstaff is killed. The Dauphin, witnessing his men's retreat, restates Hal's challenge, but slips in the mud until Hal orders his soldiers to kill him. Hal commands the execution of all French prisoners to prevent regrouping, despite Falstaff's warning against this unchivalrous act unworthy of a king.

Hal meets King Charles VI, who agrees to adopt him as his heir and offers him his daughter, Catherine of Valois. Hal returns to England with his new wife for a triumphant celebration. In private, she challenges his reasons for invading France and denies the alleged French actions against him, suggesting that the assassin was a plot from within his own court. Suspicious, Hal confronts Gascoigne, who admits that he staged the insult and acts of aggression, believing his sole duty is to protect the King, even if it requires deceiving him. In a cold fury, Hal kills the Chief Justice. Hal asks Catherine to only speak truth to him as the citizens of England cheer him on outside the castle.

== Cast ==
- Timothée Chalamet as Henry V of England
- Joel Edgerton as Sir John Falstaff
- Sean Harris as Chief Justice Sir William Gascoigne
- Tom Glynn-Carney as Sir Harry "Hotspur" Percy
- Lily-Rose Depp as Catherine of Valois
- Thomasin McKenzie as Philippa, Queen of Denmark
- Robert Pattinson as Louis, Duke of Guyenne
- Ben Mendelsohn as King Henry IV of England
- Andrew Havill as Archbishop of Canterbury
- Dean-Charles Chapman as Thomas
- Steven Elder as Dorset
- Edward Ashley as Cambridge
- Stephen Fewell as Grey
- Tara Fitzgerald as Hooper
- Tom Fisher as Northumberland
- Ivan Kaye as Scrope

In addition, Thibault de Montalembert has a cameo as France's King Charles VI.

== Production ==
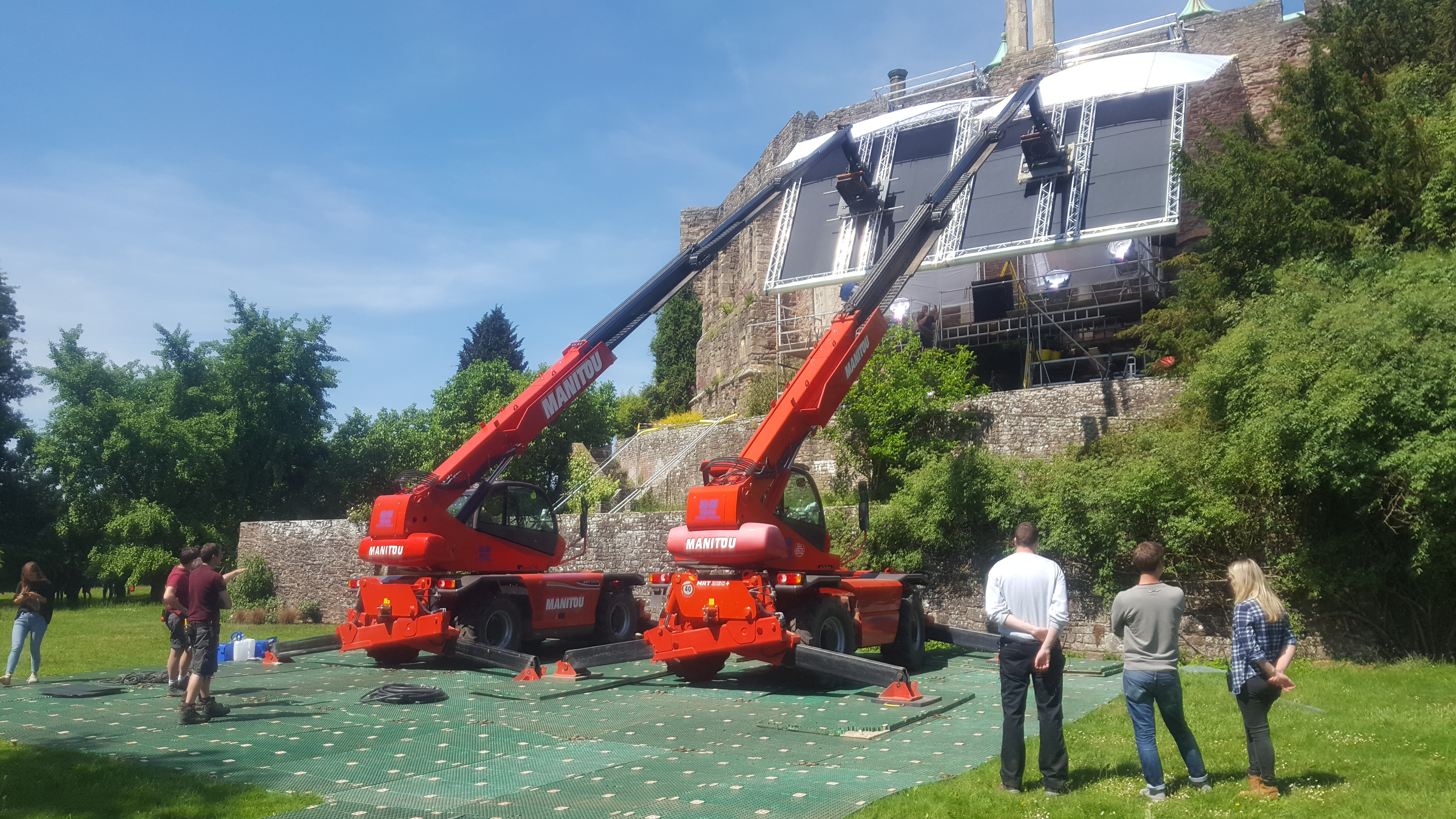
Filming on location at Berkeley Castle, Gloucestershire, UK.

=== Development ===
In 2013, it was revealed that Joel Edgerton and David Michôd had collaborated on writing an adaptation of three plays in William Shakespeare's Henriad – Henry IV, Part 1; Henry IV, Part 2 and Henry V – for Warner Bros. Pictures. In September 2015, it was announced that Michôd would direct the project, with Warner Bros. producing and distributing the film, and Lava Bear producing.

=== Casting ===
In February 2018, Timothée Chalamet joined the cast, with Brad Pitt, Dede Gardner, and Jeremy Kleiner producing, alongside Liz Watts, under their Plan B Entertainment banner. Ultimately, Netflix distributed the film instead of Warner Bros. In March 2018, Edgerton joined the cast of the film. In May 2018, Robert Pattinson, Ben Mendelsohn, Sean Harris, Lily-Rose Depp, Tom Glynn-Carney, and Thomasin McKenzie joined the cast; Dean-Charles Chapman joined in June.

=== Filming ===
Principal photography began on 1 June 2018 and wrapped on 24 August. Filming took place throughout England and at Szilvásvárad, Hungary. Many scenes were filmed on location at Berkeley Castle in Gloucestershire, England. Lincoln Cathedral was used in place of Westminster Abbey for the coronation scenes.

=== Music ===
The film's original score was composed by Nicholas Britell, who thought of approaching the film's music from the 21st century, instead of the medieval 15th century approach, saying "because of the timelessness of these issues, if felt like something that we could explore with the sound of different time periods, just to make you look at the early 1400's in a way that it felt like you hadn't seen it before". He felt that the "1400s looks like it was a foreign planet". He experimented the film's music using bass clarinets run with tape filters, and sounds of metal while composing. It was Britell's most "dark and sombre" music reflecting the zone of the film. Lakeshore Records released the album consisting of 15 tracks from Britell's score, on 1 November 2019 in digital and CD formats, while the vinyl edition was released three years later on 8 July 2022.

== Release ==
The film had its world premiere at the Venice Film Festival on 2 September 2019. It screened at the BFI London Film Festival on 3 October 2019, and received a limited release on 11 October 2019 before being released on Netflix, for digital streaming, on 1 November 2019.

== Historical accuracy ==
Rather than a historical documentary film, The King is a 21st century adaptation of William Shakespeare's 16th-century Henriad, which are fictionalised adaptations of 15th-century events; as The Independent opined, "as an adaptation of an adaptation, a few things are bound to have been lost in translation". After its release, The King became the subject of widespread commentary over its historical accuracy. The film, based on the Henriad, a collection of Shakespearean history plays about the monarchs of England, includes several fictional characters (such as John Falstaff) and contains several historical dramatisations of the real events the movie was based on.

Numerous articles were published on the historicity of The King, analysing the historical accuracy of various elements of the movie. The following historical inaccuracies were mentioned:

- The film depicts Henry V as being reluctant to go to war with France, but being eventually persuaded by the Archbishop of Canterbury. In reality, Henry V was keen to go to war with the French, with his primary motivation being expansionist territorial claims in France.
- The character of John Falstaff, as depicted in the film, is a fictional character created by Shakespeare. Many historians have suggested that the English knight Sir John Fastolf served as a real-life inspiration for the character of Falstaff.
- The film depicts a rivalry between Henry V and his brother, Prince Thomas, who is depicted as dying in Wales prior to Henry's coronation, an event which pushes Henry to ascend to the throne. In reality, Thomas was killed in action at Battle of Baugé in the Duchy of Anjou eight years after Henry V's coronation.
- The King depicts the Battle of Agincourt as taking place on green and hilly terrain, when in reality it occurred on fallow fields on the French plains. The film also depicts the French as holding the heights during the battle when in reality it was the English who did so.
- The film implies that Henry V and Catherine of Valois married almost immediately after the Battle of Agincourt, when in reality their marriage occurred five years later on 2 June 1420.
- The film depicts the Dauphin of France, Louis de Guyenne, as being present at the Siege of Harfleur (summer 1415) and the Battle of Agincourt (October 1415, shown dying in the battle) when in reality, he was present at neither battle and died of dysentery in December 1415.
- A crucial part of the English defence, the sharpened stakes, or palings, which were set at an angle towards the French cavalry to protect the archers, was almost entirely ignored in the film although there was a brief shot of a small pile of palings awaiting deployment.
- The film's costume design consists of numerous anachronisms and inaccuracies, consisting of armor and clothing from the entirety of the fifteenth century not present during the film's period, alongside entirely ahistorical designs.

== Reception ==
=== Critical response ===
On the review aggregator website Rotten Tomatoes, 71% of 146 critics' reviews are positive, with an average rating of 6.6/10. The website's consensus reads: "While The King is sometimes less than the sum of its impressive parts, strong source material and gripping performances make this a period drama worth hailing." Metacritic, which uses a weighted average, assigned the film a score of 62 out of 100, based on 38 critics, indicating "generally favorable" reviews.

=== Box office ===
While released on Netflix, The King did receive a limited theatrical release (43 screens total, for three weeks) in South Korea and New Zealand, grossing $126,931 at the box office.

=== Accolades ===
Award	Date of ceremony	Category	Nominee(s)	Result	Ref.
AACTA Awards	4 December 2019	Best Film	Brad Pitt, Dede Gardner, Jeremy Kleiner, Liz Watts, David Michôd, Joel Edgerton	Nominated	
AACTA Awards	4 December 2019	Best Direction	David Michôd	Nominated	
AACTA Awards	4 December 2019	Best Actor in a Leading Role	Timothée Chalamet	Nominated	
AACTA Awards	4 December 2019	Best Actor in a Supporting Role	Joel Edgerton	Won	
AACTA Awards	4 December 2019	Best Actor in a Supporting Role	Ben Mendelsohn	Nominated	
AACTA Awards	4 December 2019	Best Cinematography	Adam Arkapaw	Won	
AACTA Awards	4 December 2019	Best Editing	Peter Sciberras	Nominated	
AACTA Awards	4 December 2019	Best Sound	Robert Mackenzie, Sam Petty, Gareth John, Leah Katz, Mario Vacarro, Tara Webb	Nominated	
AACTA Awards	4 December 2019	Best Production Design	Fiona Crombie, Alice Felton	Won	
AACTA Awards	4 December 2019	Best Costume Design	Jane Petrie	Won	
AACTA Awards	4 December 2019	Best Screenplay	David Michôd, Joel Edgerton	Nominated	
AACTA Awards	4 December 2019	Best Hair and Makeup	Alessandro Bertolazzi	Nominated	
AACTA Awards	4 December 2019	Best Casting	Des Hamilton, Francine Maisler	Nominated	
AACTA Awards	4 January 2020	Best International Film	Brad Pitt, Dede Gardner, Jeremy Kleiner, Liz Watts, David Michôd, Joel Edgerton	Nominated	
Hollywood Music in Media Awards	20 November 2019	Best Original Score in a Feature Film	Nicholas Britell	Nominated	
London Film Critics' Circle	30 January 2020	British / Irish Actor of the Year	Robert Pattinson	Won	

== See also ==
- Chimes at Midnight, a film adaptation of the Henriad by Orson Welles from 1965
- "Henry V", the fourth episode of the 2012 TV series The Hollow Crown, covering roughly the same material and themes.
- Henry V (1989 film)
