= House of York =

Cadet branch of the House of Plantagenet

- As descendants of King Edward III in the male line, the first three Dukes of York bore the arms of that King (adjusted for France modern) differenced by a label of three points argent each bearing three torteaux gules. The 4th Duke, later King Edward IV, abandoned his paternal arms in favour of new arms emphasising his descent via female lines from the royal line of Clarence/de Burgh/Mortimer, senior to that of the House of Lancaster
- Parent house: House of Plantagenet
- Country: Kingdom of England; Lordship of Ireland
- Founded: 1385; 640 years ago
- Founder: Edmund of Langley
- Current head: Extinct
- Final ruler: Richard III of England
- Titles: King of England; King of France (titular); Prince of Wales; Lord of Ireland; Duke of York; Duke of Clarence; Duke of Gloucester; Earl of Cambridge; Earl of March; Earl of Rutland; Earl of Ulster
- Dissolution: 1499
- Deposition: 1485

Coat of arms of King Edward IV of England (as Duke of York), adopted in lieu of his paternal arms: Quarterly of 4: 1: Lionel, Duke of Clarence (royal arms of King Edward III, undifferenced); 2&3: de Burgh; 4: Mortimer. This emphasised his claim to seniority over the House of Lancaster

The House of York was a cadet branch of the English royal House of Plantagenet. It fought with the House of Lancaster, another cadet branch of the House of Plantagenet, for the English crown in the second half of the 15th century. The differences ultimately led to the Wars of the Roses. These wars are so named because each house had a rose in its coat of arms: York a white one and Lancaster a red one.

Three members of the House of York became kings of England in the late 15th century: Edward IV, Edward V and Richard III. The House of York descended in the male line from Edmund of Langley, 1st Duke of York, the fourth surviving son of Edward III. In time, it also represented Edward III's senior line, when an heir of York married the heiress-descendant of Lionel, Duke of Clarence, Edward III's second surviving son. It is based on these descents that the House of York claimed the English crown. Compared with its rival, the House of Lancaster, it had a superior claim to the throne of England according to cognatic primogeniture, but an inferior claim according to agnatic primogeniture. The reign of this dynasty ended with the death of Richard III of England at the Battle of Bosworth Field in 1485. It became extinct in the male line with the death of Edward Plantagenet, 17th Earl of Warwick, in 1499.

== Descent from Edward III ==
The fourth surviving legitimate son of Edward III and Philippa of Hainault, Edmund of Langley, 1st Duke of York, was created earl of Cambridge in 1362 and the first duke of York in 1385. Edmund's first marriage was to Isabella of Castile, Duchess of York, daughter of Peter of Castile and María de Padilla, and sister of Constance of Castile, second wife of Edmund's older brother John of Gaunt. Through this marriage Edmund had two sons, Edward, 2nd duke of York and the younger Richard of Conisburgh. His second marriage was to Joan Holland, whose sister Alianore Holland was mother to Anne Mortimer, the great-great-granddaughter of Edward III via Lionel of Antwerp, Duke of Clarence, second surviving son of Edward III, and the elder brother of John of Gaunt. Richard of Conisburgh married Anne Mortimer, the marriage producing two children, Isabel of Cambridge and Richard of York, 3rd Duke of York. It was through Anne Mortimer's lineage that the Yorkists derived their main claim to the throne.

Following Edmund of Langley's death in 1402, his son Edward succeeded to the dukedom but had no issue before he was killed at the Battle of Agincourt in 1415. His other son Richard had been executed for treason earlier in the same year following his involvement in the Southampton Plot to depose Henry V in favour of Edmund Mortimer, Richard's brother-in-law. The dukedom therefore passed to Richard's son, who became Richard of York, 3rd Duke of York. Being descended from Edward III in both the maternal and the paternal line gave Richard a significant claim to the throne if the Lancastrian line should fail, and by cognatic primogeniture arguably a superior claim. He emphasised the point by being the first to assume the Plantagenet surname in 1448. Having inherited the March and Ulster titles, he became the wealthiest and most powerful noble in England, second only to the king himself. Richard married Cecily Neville, a granddaughter of John of Gaunt, and had thirteen or possibly fifteen children:

- Anne of York (1439–1476)—(Mitochondrial DNA taken from a descendant of her second daughter, Anne St Leger, Baroness de Ros, was used in the identification of the remains of Richard III, which were found in 2012.)
- Henry (b. 1441; died as a child)
- Edward (1442–1483)
- Edmund (1443–1460)
- Elizabeth (1444–1503)—married John de la Pole, 2nd Duke of Suffolk; she was the mother of several claimants to the throne.
- Margaret (1446–1503)—married Charles the Bold, Duke of Burgundy.
- William (b. 1447; died as a child)
- John (b. 1448; died as a child)
- George (1449–1478)
- Thomas (b. 1450/51; died as a child)
- Richard (1452–1485)
- Ursula (b. 1455; died as a child)
- In her will, Cecily stated that Katherine and Humphrey were her children, but they may have been her grandchildren through de la Pole.

== Wars of the Roses ==
Despite his elevated status, Richard Plantagenet was denied a position in government by the advisers of the weak Henry VI, particularly John Beaufort, 1st Duke of Somerset, and the queen consort, Margaret of Anjou. Although he served as protector of the realm during Henry VI's period of incapacity in 1453–54, his reforms were reversed by Somerset's party once the king had recovered.

The Wars of the Roses began the following year, with the First Battle of St Albans. Initially, Richard aimed only to purge his Lancastrian political opponents from positions of influence over the king. It was not until October 1460 that he claimed the throne for the House of York. In that year the Yorkists had captured the king at the battle of Northampton, but victory was short-lived. Richard and his second son Edmund were killed at the battle of Wakefield on 30 December.

Richard's claim to the throne was inherited by his son Edward. With the support of Richard Neville, 16th Earl of Warwick ("The Kingmaker"), Edward, already showing great promise as a leader of men, defeated the Lancastrians in a succession of battles. While Henry VI and Margaret of Anjou were campaigning in the north, Warwick gained control of the capital and had Edward declared king in London in 1461. Edward strengthened his claim with a decisive victory at the Battle of Towton in the same year, in the course of which the Lancastrian army was virtually wiped out.

== Reigns of the Yorkist Kings ==
The early reign of Edward IV was marred by Lancastrian plotting and uprisings in favour of Henry VI. Warwick himself changed sides, and supported Margaret of Anjou and the king's jealous brother George, Duke of Clarence, in briefly restoring Henry in 1470–71. However, Edward regained his throne, and the House of Lancaster was wiped out with the death of Henry VI himself, in the Tower of London in 1471. In 1478, the continued trouble caused by Clarence led to his execution in the Tower of London; popularly he is thought to have been drowned in a butt of malmsey wine.

On Edward's death in 1483, the crown passed to his twelve-year-old son Edward V. Edward IV's younger brother Richard, Duke of Gloucester, was appointed Protector, and the young king, and his brother Richard, were accommodated into the Tower of London. The famous Princes in the Tower's fate remains a mystery. As today it is unknown whether they were killed or who might have killed them. Parliament declared, in the document Titulus Regius, that the two boys were illegitimate, on the grounds that Edward IV's marriage was invalid, and as such Richard was heir to the throne. He was crowned Richard III in July 1483.

== Defeat of the House of York ==
The House of Lancaster's claimants were now the Royal Houses of Portugal and Castile through the Duke of Lancaster's two legitimate daughters, who had married into those houses. However, Henry Tudor, a descendant of the Beauforts (a legitimized branch of the House of Lancaster), put forward his claim. Furthermore, some Edwardian loyalists were undeniably opposed to Richard, dividing his Yorkist power base. A coup attempt failed in late 1483, but in 1485 Richard met Henry Tudor at the battle of Bosworth Field. During the battle, some of Richard's important supporters switched sides or withheld their retainers from the field. Richard himself was killed. He was the last of the Plantagenet kings, as well as the last English king to die in battle.

Henry Tudor declared himself king, took Elizabeth of York, eldest daughter of Edward IV, as his wife, claiming to have united the surviving houses of York and Lancaster, and acceded to the throne as Henry VII, founder of the Tudor dynasty which reigned until 1603.

=== Later claimants ===
At the time when Henry VII of England seized the throne there were eighteen Plantagenet descendants who might today be thought to have a stronger hereditary claim. By 1510 this number increased with the birth of sixteen Yorkist children. However, Henry VII's marriage to Elizabeth of York, eldest daughter of Edward IV, made their children his cognatic heirs. Margaret of York, Duchess of Burgundy—Edward's sister—and members of the de la Pole family—children of Edward's sister Elizabeth and John de la Pole, 2nd Duke of Suffolk— continued in attempts to restore a Yorkist line. Margaret's nephew Edward, Earl of Warwick, the son of her brother George, was imprisoned in the Tower of London, but in 1487 Margaret financed a rebellion led by Lambert Simnel pretending to be Warwick, or "Edward VI". John de la Pole, 1st Earl of Lincoln, joined the revolt, and was killed in the suppression of the uprising at the Battle of Stoke Field in 1487. Warwick was implicated in further failed invasions supported by Margaret by Perkin Warbeck (claiming to be Edward IV's son Richard of Shrewsbury), and was executed on 28 November 1499. With this, the houses of Plantagenet and of York became extinct in the legitimate male line.

== Family tree ==
House of York family tree

– House of York
– King of England
– Duke/House of Lancaster

– Duke of York
– House of Tudor

Edward III; 1312–1377 r. 1327–1377
Edward of Woodstock; Prince of Wales; The Black Prince; 1330–1376	Lionel of Antwerp; Duke of Clarence; 1338–1368	John of Gaunt; Duke of Lancaster; 1340–1399	Edmund of Langley; 1st Duke of York; 1341–1402
Richard II; 1367–1400 r. 1377–1399	Edmund; Mortimer; Earl of March; 1352–1381	Philippa; Countess of Ulster; 1355–1382	House of Lancaster	Edward of Norwich; 2nd Duke of York; 1373–1415
Roger; Mortimer; Earl of March; 1374–1398
Edmund; Mortimer; Earl of March; 1391–1425	Anne de Mortimer; 1390–1411	Richard of Conisburgh; Earl of Cambridge; 1385–1415
Richard; Plantagenet; 3rd Duke of York; 1411–1460
Edward IV; 4th Duke of York; 1442–1483 r. 1461–1470, 1471–1483	Edmund; Earl of Rutland; 1443–1460	George; Plantagenet; Duke of Clarence; 1449–1478	Richard III; 1452–1485 r. 1483–1485	Elizabeth of York; 1444–c. 1503	John de la Pole; Duke of Suffolk; 1442–1492
Henry VII; 1457–1509 r. 1485–1509	Elizabeth of York; 1466–1503	Edward V 1470–? r. 1483	Richard of Shrewsbury; 1st Duke of York; 1473–?	Edward; Plantagenet; Earl of Warwick; 1475–1499	Edward of Middleham; Prince of Wales c. 1473–1484
Arthur; Prince of Wales; 1486–1502	Henry VIII; Duke of York; 1491–1547 r. 1509–1547	Margaret; Tudor; 1489–1541	Mary; Tudor; 1496–1533

=== Dukes of York ===
Duke	Portrait	Arms	Birth	Marriage(s)	Death
Edmund of Langley (House of York founder); 1385–1402	Edmund of Langley		5 June 1341; Kings Langley son of Edward III of England and Philippa of Hainault	Isabella of Castile; 1372; 3 children Joan de Holland c. 4 November 1393 no children	1 August 1402; Kings Langley age 61
Edward of Norwich; 1402–1415	Edward of Norwich		1373; Norwich son of Edmund of Langley and Isabella of Castile	Philippa de Mohun c. 1397 no children	25 October 1415; Agincourt age 42
Richard Plantagenet; 1415–1460	Richard Plantagenet		21 September 1411 son of Richard of Conisburgh, 3rd Earl of Cambridge and Anne de Mortimer	Cecily Neville; 1437; 12 children	30 December 1460; Wakefield age 49
Edward Plantagenet; 1460–1461	Edward Plantagenet		28 April 1442; Rouen son of Richard Plantagenet and Cecily Neville	Elizabeth Woodville; 1 May 1464; 10 children	9 April 1483; Westminster age 40

Edward Plantagenet became Edward IV in 1461, thus merging the title of Duke of York with the crown.

=== Yorkist Kings of England ===
Name	Portrait	Arms	Birth	Marriage(s)	Death
Edward IV; 4 March 1461 – 3 October 1470 11 April 1471–1483	Edward IV		28 April 1442; Rouen son of Richard Plantagenet, 3rd Duke of York and Cecily Neville	Elizabeth Woodville; Grafton Regis; 1 May 1464; 10 children	9 April 1483; Westminster Palace age 40
Edward V 9 April–25 June 1483	Edward V		2 November 1470; Westminster son of Edward IV and Elizabeth Woodville	unmarried	c. 1483; London age about 12 (presumed murdered)
Richard III; 26 June 1483–1485	Richard III		2 October 1452; Fotheringhay Castle son of Richard Plantagenet, 3rd Duke of York and Cecily Neville	Anne Neville; Westminster Abbey; 12 July 1472; 1 son	22 August 1485; Bosworth Field age 32 (killed in battle)

== See also ==
- Quia Emptores
- Pretenders
- Alternative successions to the English and British Crown

== Bibliography ==
- Dean, Kristie (15 March 2016). On the Trail of the Yorks. Amberley Publishing Limited. ISBN 978-1-4456-4714-2.
- Horrox, Rosemary (2004). "Pole, John de la, earl of Lincoln (c. 1460–1487)". Oxford Dictionary of National Biography (online ed.). Oxford University Press. doi:10.1093/ref:odnb/22449. (Subscription, Wikipedia Library access or UK public library membership required.)
  —— (2011). "Edward IV (1442–1483)". Oxford Dictionary of National Biography (online ed.). Oxford University Press. doi:10.1093/ref:odnb/8520. (Subscription, Wikipedia Library access or UK public library membership required.)
  —— (2013b). "Edward V (1470–1483)". Oxford Dictionary of National Biography (online ed.). Oxford University Press. doi:10.1093/ref:odnb/8521. (Subscription, Wikipedia Library access or UK public library membership required.)
  —— (2013). "Richard III (1452–1485)". Oxford Dictionary of National Biography (online ed.). Oxford University Press. doi:10.1093/ref:odnb/23500. (Subscription, Wikipedia Library access or UK public library membership required.)
- Jones, Michael (2008). "Margaret, duchess of Burgundy (1446–1503)". Oxford Dictionary of National Biography (online ed.). Oxford University Press. doi:10.1093/ref:odnb/18051. (Subscription, Wikipedia Library access or UK public library membership required.)
- Starkey, David (2009). Henry. Harper Perennial. ISBN 978-0-00-724772-1.
- Watts, John (2011). "Richard of York, third duke of York (1411–1460)". Oxford Dictionary of National Biography (online ed.). Oxford University Press. doi:10.1093/ref:odnb/23503. (Subscription, Wikipedia Library access or UK public library membership required.)
- Weir, Alison (2008). Britain's Royal Families. Vintage. ISBN 978-0-09-953973-5.

Royal house House of York Cadet branch of the House of Plantagenet
Preceded by House of Lancaster	Ruling house of the Kingdom of England; 1461–1470	Succeeded by House of Lancaster
Preceded by House of Lancaster	Ruling house of the Kingdom of England; 1471–1485	Succeeded by House of Tudor
