= Mohun (surname) =

Mohun is an Irish or Anglo-Norman surname.

People with this surname

- Guy Mohun (died 1407), English royal administrator and bishop
- Michael Mohun (1616?–1684), British actor
- Richard Mohun (1865–1915), American explorer and soldier of fortune
- William Mohun, English politician
- Philippa de Mohun (died 1431), Duchess of York
- William de Mohun of Dunster, 1st Earl of Somerset (c. 1090 – c. 1155), English lord
- Baron Mohun a title in the English peerage created in 1299
  - John de Mohun, 2nd Baron Mohun (1320–1376)
- Baron Mohun of Okehampton, a title in the English peerage created in 1628
  - John Mohun (1595–1641), the first Baron
  - Charles Mohun, 4th Baron Mohun (c. 1675 – 1712)
