= Edward, 2nd Duke of York =

14th-century English noble

Edward of Norwich
- Duke of York
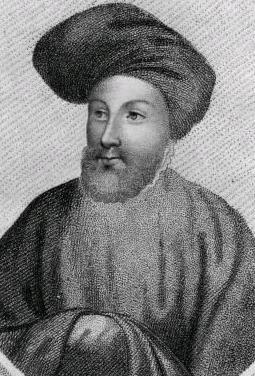
- 1793 portrait by Edward Harding, after a 15th century original in the chronicle of Jean Creton
- Born: c. 1373; Langley, Hertfordshire, England
- Died: 25 October 1415 (aged c. 42); Battle of Agincourt, France
- Burial: 1 December 1415; Church of St Mary and All Saints, Fotheringhay
- Spouse: Philippa de Mohun (m. 1398)
- House: York
- Father: Edmund of Langley, 1st Duke of York
- Mother: Isabella of Castile
- Occupation: Nobleman, soldier, author

Edward, 2nd Duke of York, (c. 1373 – 25 October 1415), known as the Earl of Rutland between 1390 and 1397 and again between 1399 and 1402 and as the Duke of Aumale between 1397 and 1399, was an English nobleman, military commander and magnate. He was the eldest son of Edmund of Langley, 1st Duke of York, and a grandson of King Edward III. He held significant appointments during the reigns of Richard II, Henry IV, and Henry V, and is also known for his translation of the hunting treatise The Master of Game. He was killed in 1415 at the Battle of Agincourt, while commanding the right wing of the English army.

== Family ==
Edward of Norwich was born c. 1373, likely at Langley, now Kings Langley in Hertfordshire. He was the eldest son of Edmund of Langley, 1st Duke of York (a younger son of King Edward III), and his first wife, Isabella of Castile (a daughter of King Peter of Castile). He had a sister Constance and a younger brother Richard, 3rd Earl of Cambridge.

According to G. E. Cokayne, a French chronicle offers the only support for the modern assertion that Edward was styled of Norwich, and both Cokayne and Horrox suggest that the phrase 'de Norwik' found therein is a corruption or misreading of « d'everwick », the usual French rendering for the phrase of York at the time.

== Reign of Richard II ==
Edward was knighted at the coronation of his cousin, King Richard II, on 16 July 1377, and in May 1387 was admitted to the Order of the Garter. He was close to the King throughout his life, and benefited even in his youth from numerous royal grants and appointments. On 25 February 1390, the King created him Earl of Rutland, and on 22 March 1391 made him admiral of the northern fleet; he was made sole admiral the following November. In 1392, he became a member of King Richard's council, and was with the King during a campaign in Ireland in 1394–5. Prior to that, although no patent has been found, he was created Earl of Cork. He used the styles of Rutland and Cork throughout the remainder of his life.

In the late 1390s, Edward was sent on embassies to France and to the Count Palatine and was appointed to numerous offices, including Constable of Dover Castle, Lord Warden of the Cinque Ports, Keeper of the Channel Islands, Constable of the Tower, Warden of the New Forest, Keeper of Carisbrooke Castle and Lord of the Isle of Wight.

On 11 July 1397, Richard II arrested his uncle Thomas of Woodstock, Duke of Gloucester. Edward was granted Gloucester's office of Constable of England on 12 July and was one of an eight-member commission that on 5 August determined to accuse Gloucester, Thomas Beauchamp, Earl of Warwick, and Richard FitzAlan, Earl of Arundel of high treason. Edward was later accused of having sent his servants to assist in Gloucester's subsequent murder at Calais, an allegation he denied. However, on 28 September 1397, he received a large grant of Gloucester, Warwick and Arundel's forfeited lands. On 29 September, he was created Duke of Aumale, a title that had earlier been granted to Gloucester on 3 September 1385.

On 16 September 1398 Edward presided as constable over the aborted judicial combat between Henry Bolingbroke, the future Henry IV and Thomas de Mowbray, Duke of Norfolk, which ended with Bolingbroke and Norfolk being exiled by King Richard.

Additional royal grants followed during the final years of King Richard's reign. On 10 February 1398 Edward was appointed Warden of the West March. On 11 August 1398 he was granted custody of the lands of Roger Mortimer, Earl of March, during Mortimer's son's minority, and on 20 March 1399 lands which had lately belonged to John of Gaunt, Duke of Lancaster, and which were part of the inheritance of his son, Henry Bolingbroke, the future King Henry IV.

In May 1399, Edward accompanied King Richard to Ireland, and in the King's absence, Henry Bolingbroke (the future King Henry IV) landed towards the end of June near Ravenspur, Yorkshire, with a small band of exiles. During the following three weeks, Bolingbroke's forces were augmented by loyal Lancastrian supporters and were soon joined by the most powerful of the northern magnates, Henry Percy, Earl of Northumberland and Ralph Neville, Earl of Westmorland. King Richard's fatal decision to divide his army while still in Ireland has been attributed to advice from Edward. The King sent some of his troops ahead to North Wales under the command of the John Montacute, Earl of Salisbury, and about 19 July arrived at Milford Haven in South Wales with the rest of his forces. News of the strength of Bolingbroke's army then caused the King to desert the troops with him and travel to North Wales in an attempt to join Salisbury. However Salisbury's troops, having heard rumours of the King's death, had dispersed, and the army left behind by the King did so as well. Although he could have made his escape by sea, the King ensnared himself in negotiations with Bolingbroke. Meanwhile, Edward's father Edmund of Langley, 1st Duke of York, who had been left in charge of the kingdom during King Richard's absence, and had raised an army on hearing of Bolingbroke's landing in Yorkshire, capitulated to Bolingbroke at Berkeley on 27 July. Edward speedily deserted to Bolingbroke as well and was reportedly wearing Bolingbroke's livery when he was among those sent by Bolingbroke to the King at Flint Castle.

== Reign of Henry IV ==
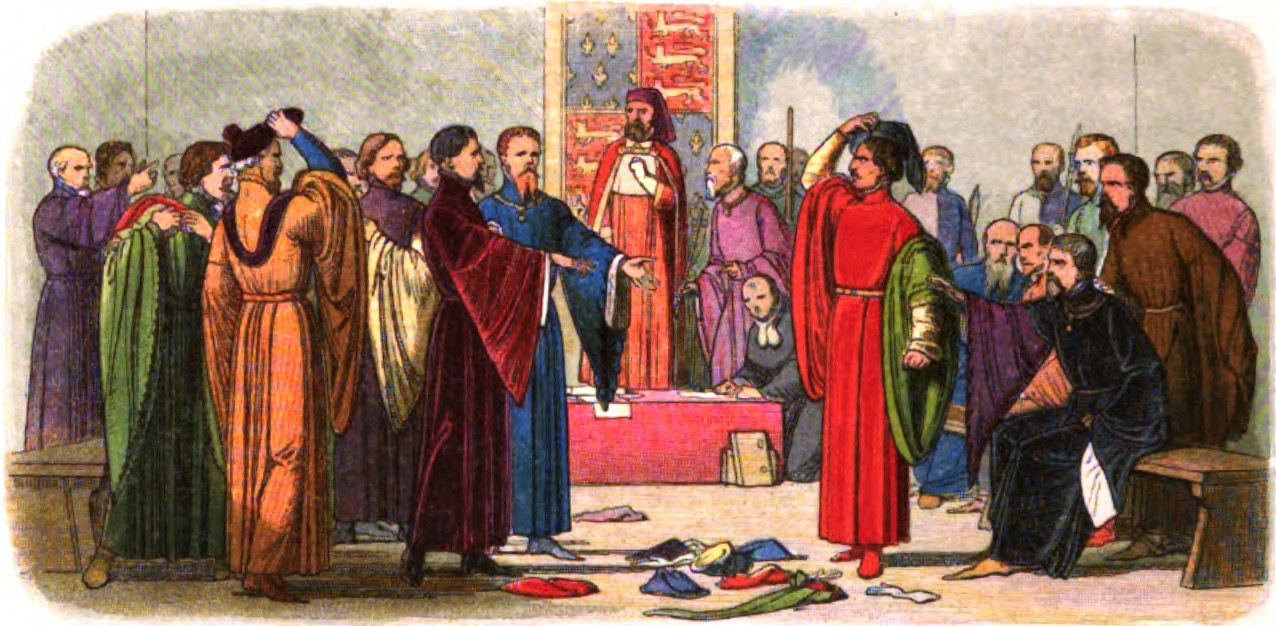
Baron FitzWalter accuses Edward of the murder of Gloucester (James William Edmund Doyle and Edmund Evans, 1864)

In response to public animosity towards King Richard's closest associates, Henry IV deprived Edward of his office of Constable of the Tower on 31 August 1399, shortly after his accession. On 20 October 1399, he was imprisoned at Windsor Castle, and on 3 November deprived of the dukedom of Aumale, but not his other titles. Edward's period of disfavour was not long-lasting, however. The King confirmed him in his offices in connection with the Channel Islands and the Isle of Wight, and by 4 December 1399 had made him a member of his council.

On 18 October 1399, during the first parliament of the new Henry IV, Walter FitzWalter, 4th Baron FitzWalter accused Edward, his stepfather, of the murder of Gloucester and challenged him to single combat. This was stopped by the king, but it was not until 1401 that FitzWalter and Edward of Norwich formally reconciled.

Edward is alleged by a French chronicler to have betrayed to the King a conspiracy at the end of 1399 by a group of Richard II's former favourites who planned to murder Henry IV and his sons at a jousting tournament at Windsor Castle on 6 January 1400. But according to James Tait, contemporary English sources that describe the conspiracy make no mention of Edward, and his role in it is open to question.

In October 1400, the King made Edward Keeper of North Wales, and on 5 July 1401, his lieutenant in Aquitaine. On 1 August 1402, Edward's father died, and he succeeded to the Duchy of York, at which time his earldom of Rutland became extinct by the terms of its charter, although he continued to sign himself Earl of Rutland. By May 1403, he was back in England. He was employed by the King in a campaign in Wales in the fall of that year, and on 12 November, he was appointed Lieutenant for South Wales for three years. Both this and his appointment in Aquitaine proved very costly, and by June 1404, he had sold or pledged his plate and was contemplating mortgaging his lands to pay his troops in Wales.

In February 1405, the Welsh rebel leader Owain Glyndŵr, Glyndŵr's son-in-law Sir Edmund Mortimer and Henry Percy, 1st Earl of Northumberland, entered into a tripartite indenture that proposed a threefold division of the kingdom. This agreement was apparently connected to a plot to free Mortimer's nephew Edmund Mortimer, 5th Earl of March, from King Henry's custody and carry him into Wales. On 13 February 1405, the young Edmund Mortimer and his brother Roger were abducted from Windsor Castle, but quickly recaptured near Cheltenham. Edward's sister Constance was held responsible and accused her brother of involvement in the failed abduction. He at first denied the charge, but later admitted to knowledge of the conspiracy. He was arrested and imprisoned for 17 weeks at Pevensey Castle, after which he petitioned for release, and by October was gradually being returned to favour. His lands were restored to him on 8 December 1405, and in November 1406, he was again made Constable of the Tower and continued to serve in a military capacity in Wales.

In the conflict over foreign policy between Henry IV and his heir, the Prince of Wales (the future King Henry V), that developed in the final years of Henry IV's reign, Edward apparently sided with the King. In 1412, he was again in France, this time in the company of the King's second son Thomas, to assist the Armagnac party against the Burgundians.

== Reign of Henry V ==
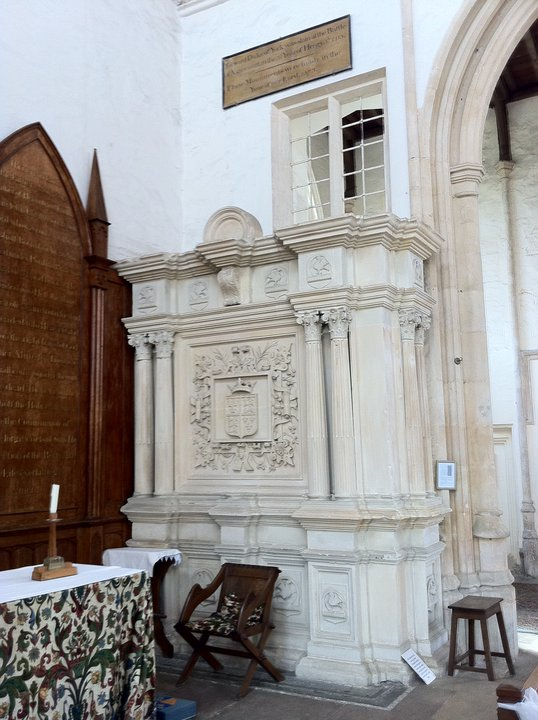
Monument to Edward, 2nd Duke of York, erected by Queen Elizabeth I (1558–1603) in Fotheringhay Church

Henry IV died on 20 March 1413. Edward may have returned to England for a brief time after the King's death, but by June 1413 he was preparing to campaign in Aquitaine. In August he was in Paris, negotiating for a marriage between the new King, Henry V, and Catherine of Valois, daughter of King Charles VI of France, but was back in England in October and active in diplomatic negotiations in the final months prior to Henry V's invasion of France in 1415.

A few days before the invasion of France, King Henry uncovered the Southampton Plot and the participation in it of Edward's younger brother, Richard of Conisburgh, Earl of Cambridge, for which the younger brother was beheaded on 5 August 1415. Edward himself was not implicated in the conspiracy, and he departed with the army for France. He was present at the Siege of Harfleur, where he made his will on 17 August 1415, then he commanded the van on the army's march through northern France. He commanded the right wing at the Battle of Agincourt on 25 October 1415, during which he became the highest-ranking English casualty. According to some, he rushed forward to save King Henry V who had been assisting the King's younger brother, Humphrey, Duke of Gloucester, and had been assailed and wounded by the Duke of Alençon. York's intervention saved the King's life but cost Edward his own. His death has been variously attributed to a head wound and to being 'smouldered to death' by 'much heat and pressing'. Edward was buried in the Church of St Mary and All Saints, Fotheringhay, where he had earlier established a college for a master and twelve chaplains. The monument now in the church was erected during the reign of Queen Elizabeth I.

As Edward did not have any sons, his four-year-old nephew Richard, son of his brother Richard, inherited the titles of Duke of York and Earl of Rutland. As head of the House of York Richard would go on to challenge the Lancastrian claims to the English crown and thus start the Wars of the Roses.

== Marriages ==
He married twice, but left no children:

Arms of King Ferdinand I of Portugal

- Firstly in 1381 to Beatrice of Portugal, the daughter of King Ferdinand I of Portugal. At the age of eight, Edward had been taken to Lisbon by his father and betrothed to Beatrice on 29 August 1381 as part of an alliance of England and Portugal against Castile, but after a rapprochement between Portugal and Castile, the marriage was annulled by papal dispensation, and Beatrice married King John I of Castile instead. Later, King Richard II suggested several possible brides for Edward, including Joan, sister of the king's wife, Isabella of Valois.

Arms of Mohun of Dunster: Or, a cross engrailed sable

- Secondly at some time before 7 October 1398 Edward married Philippa de Mohun, third daughter of Sir John V de Mohun, KG, feudal baron of Dunster in Somerset, by his wife Joan Burghersh, daughter of Bartholomew de Burghersh, 3rd Baron Burghersh, whose mother was Maud de Mortimer. Philippa brought little to her husband as her mother Joan Burghersh had sold Dunster Castle and the Mohun estates in 1376. Moreover, Philippa had produced no issue by her two previous husbands, Walter Fitzwalter, 3rd Baron Fitzwalter, and Sir John Golafre. The marriage was without issue. Philippa died on 17 July 1431 and was buried in Westminster Abbey.

== The Master of Game ==
York was Henry IV's Master of the Hart Hounds. Between 1406 and 1413 he translated and dedicated to the Prince of Wales the Livre de Chasse of Gaston III, Count of Foix, one of the most famous of the hunting treatises of the Middle Ages, to which he added five chapters of his own, the English version being known as The Master of Game.

== Titles and arms ==
=== Titles ===
- Duke of York (1 August 1402 – 25 October 1415)
- Earl of Cambridge (1 August 1402 – c. 1414)
- Duke of Aumale (29 September 1397 – 3 November 1399)
- Earl of Rutland (25 February 1390 – 1 August 1402)
- Earl of Cork (c. 1395)

=== Arms ===
As a grandson of the sovereign in the male line, Edward of Norwich bore the arms of the kingdom, differenced by a label 3-point, per pale Castile and Leon. In 1402, he inherited his father's arms, which were those of the kingdom differentiated by a label argent of three points, each bearing three torteaux gules.

Coats of arms of Edward of Norwich

As Earl of Rutland
(1390–1402)

As Duke of York
(1402–1406)

As Duke of York
(1406–1415)

== Shakespeare and Edward of Norwich, 2nd Duke of York ==
As the Duke of Aumerle, Edward of Langley is a major character in William Shakespeare's Richard II. His death at Agincourt (as Duke of York) is portrayed in Shakespeare's Henry V. There is no mention in either play, however, that the Duke of Aumerle portrayed in Richard II and the Duke of York portrayed in Henry V are, in fact, the same historical individual.

== Footnotes ==
Legal offices
Preceded by The Earl of Kent	Justice in Eyre; South of Trent; 1397–1415	Succeeded by The Duke of Gloucester
Peerage of England
Preceded by Edmund of Langley	Duke of York; 1402–1415	Succeeded by Richard of York
New creation	Earl of Rutland; 1390–1415	Succeeded by Richard of York
