= Alianore Holland, Countess of March =

Countess of March

Alianore Holland
- Countess of March; Baroness Cherleton
- Victorian engraving of Alianore Holland
- Born: 13 October 1370; Upholland, Lancashire, England
- Died: 18 October 1405 (aged 35)
- Noble family: Holland
- Spouses: Roger Mortimer, 4th Earl of March; Edward Charleton, 5th Baron Cherleton
- Issue: Anne Mortimer; Edmund Mortimer, 5th Earl of March; Roger Mortimer; Eleanor Mortimer; Joan de Cherleton; Joyce de Cherleton
- Father: Thomas Holland, 2nd Earl of Kent
- Mother: Alice FitzAlan

Alianore Holland, Countess of March (also spelt Eleanor; 13 October 1370 – October 1405) was the eldest daughter of Thomas Holland, 2nd Earl of Kent, and the wife of Roger Mortimer, 4th Earl of March, heir presumptive to her uncle, King Richard II. Through her daughter, Anne Mortimer, she was the great-grandmother of the Yorkist kings Edward IV and Richard III. She was governess to Richard II's wife, Isabella of Valois.

== Family ==
Alianore Holland was born 13 October 1370 in Upholland, Lancashire, the eldest child of Thomas Holland, 2nd Earl of Kent, and Lady Alice FitzAlan, the daughter of Richard de Arundel, 10th Earl of Arundel, and his second wife, Eleanor of Lancaster, daughter of Henry, 3rd Earl of Lancaster, grandson of King Henry III.

Her paternal grandparents were Thomas Holland, 1st Earl of Kent, and Joan of Kent, mother of King Richard II by her third marriage to Edward the Black Prince. As such, Alianore's father was a maternal half-brother to Richard II.

Alianore's aunts were Queen Anne of Bohemia, daughter of Charles IV, Holy Roman Emperor, of the Royal House of Luxembourg, and Queen Isabella of Valois, daughter of King Charles VI of France, of the Royal House of Valois.

Alianore had four brothers and six sisters:

- Thomas Holland, 1st Duke of Surrey, who married Joan Stafford, daughter of Hugh de Stafford, 2nd Earl of Stafford
- John Holland (born 2 November 1374)
- Richard Holland (3 April 1376 – 21 May 1396)
- Edmund Holland, 4th Earl of Kent, who was reportedly betrothed to Constance of York, widow of Thomas le Despenser, 1st Earl of Gloucester, and who married Lucia Visconti, youngest daughter of Lord Bernabò Visconti
- Joan Holland, who married, firstly, Edmund of Langley, 1st Duke of York; second William Willoughby, 5th Baron Willoughby de Eresby; thirdly, Henry Scrope, 3rd Baron Scrope of Masham; and, fourthly, Sir Henry Bromflete, later made Baron Vessy.
- Eleanor Holland (the second of that name), who married Thomas Montagu, 4th Earl of Salisbury
- Margaret Holland, who married, firstly, John Beaufort, 1st Earl of Somerset, and, secondly, Thomas of Lancaster, Duke of Clarence, of the Royal House of Lancaster
- Elizabeth Holland, who married Sir John Neville of Sutton (in Gualtres), Yorkshire
- Anne Holland (b. 4 December 1389)
- Bridget (a nun)

== Marriages and issue ==
Alianore Holland married twice:

=== First marriage ===
Firstly, on or about 7 October 1388, to Roger Mortimer (c. 1375 – 1398), the 14-year-old ward of her father and son and heir of Edmund Mortimer, 3rd Earl of March (d.1381), and a great-grandson of King Edward III.

Edmund Mortimer, 3rd Earl of March, had died in 1381, leaving a six-year-old son, Roger Mortimer, as heir to the vast Mortimer estates. According to Davies, the wardship of such an important heir was an 'issue of political moment in the years 1382–4', and eventually Mortimer's lands were granted to a consortium for £4000 per annum, and the guardianship of his person was initially granted to Richard Fitzalan, 11th Earl of Arundel. However at the behest of King Richard's mother, Joan of Kent, in August 1384 Mortimer's wardship and marriage were granted, for 6000 marks, to Joan's son, Thomas Holland, 2nd Earl of Kent, and on or about 7 October 1388 Kent married Mortimer to his daughter, Alianore.

Roger Mortimer had a claim to the crown through his mother, Philippa Plantagenet, daughter and heiress of Lionel of Antwerp, 1st Duke of Clarence, the third but second surviving son of King Edward III. Since Richard II had no issue, Roger Mortimer, as his nephew and as a lineal descendant of Edward III, was arguably next in line to the throne (which argument was later successfully used by the first Yorkist king Edward IV to gain the throne). G. E. Cokayne states that in October 1385 Mortimer was proclaimed by the king as heir presumptive. This was disputed by Davies who declared that the story that Richard publicly proclaimed Mortimer as heir presumptive in Parliament in October 1385 is baseless, although even Davies admitted the claim was openly discussed at the time. The matter was cleared up in 2006 when it was observed that the declaration took place in the parliament of 1386, not that of 1385, and had been dislodged by an interpolation in the Eulogium chronicle, and is supported by a reference in the Westminster Chronicle (see Ian Mortimer, 'Richard II and the Succession to the Crown', History, vol. 91 (2006), pp. 320–36).

On 20 July 1398, at the age of 24, Roger Mortimer was slain in a skirmish with 'O'Brien's men' at Kells. The Wigmore chronicler says that he was riding in front of his army, unattended and wearing Irish garb, and that those who slew him did not know who he was. He was interred at Wigmore Abbey. The king went to Ireland in the following year to avenge Mortimer's death. The Wigmore chronicler, while criticising Mortimer for lust and remissness in his duty to God, extols him as 'of approved honesty, active in knightly exercises, glorious in pleasantry, affable and merry in conversation, excelling his contemporaries in beauty of appearance, sumptuous in his feasting, and liberal in his gifts'.

Alianore had two sons and two daughters by Roger Mortimer:

- Edmund Mortimer, 5th Earl of March, eldest son and heir. Together with his brother Roger he was kept in custody by King Henry IV until the end of his reign; Henry IV had seized the throne from his first cousin King Richard II, but as the son of John of Gaunt, the younger brother of Lionel of Antwerp, arguably he had a weaker claim to the throne than the latter's descendants, albeit their claim would be via female lines.
- Roger Mortimer (23 April 1393 – c. 1413)
- Anne Mortimer, who together with her sister Eleanor was in her mother's care until her death in 1405. According to Griffiths, they were not well treated by the king, and were described as 'destitute' after her death in 1405. She married Richard of Conisburgh, 3rd Earl of Cambridge (died 1411).
- Eleanor Mortimer, who married Sir Edward de Courtenay (d. 1418), the eldest son of Edward de Courtenay, 3rd/11th Earl of Devon, but had no issue.

=== Second marriage ===
Secondly, before 19 June 1399, Alianore married Edward Charleton, 5th Baron Cherleton (1371–1421), a Welsh marcher lord, by whom she had two daughters, co-heiresses to their father and, after 1425, co-heiresses to their half-brother, Edmund Mortimer, 5th Earl of March:

- Joan Charleton, who married John Grey, 1st Earl of Tankerville, brother of Sir Thomas Grey, executed for his part in the Southampton Plot which aimed to replace King Henry V with Alianore's son, Edmund Mortimer, 5th Earl of March. Her only child was Henry Grey, 2nd Earl of Tankerville (c. 1418/19 – 1450).
- Joyce Charleton, who married John Tiptoft, 1st Baron Tiptoft, and had issue.

== Death ==
Eleanor died in childbirth in October 1405. She was buried in Bisham Priory, Bisham.

== Ancestry ==
Ancestors of Alianore Holland, Countess of March

Sir Robert de Holland
Robert de Holland, 1st Baron Holand
Elizabeth de Samlesbury
Thomas Holland, 1st Earl of Kent
Alan la Zouche, 1st Baron la Zouche of Ashby
Maud la Zouche
Eleanor de Segrave
Thomas Holland, 2nd Earl of Kent
Edward I of England
Edmund of Woodstock, 1st Earl of Kent
Marguerite of France
Joan of Kent
John Wake, 1st Baron Wake of Liddell
Margaret Wake, 3rd Baroness Wake of Liddell
Joan de Fiennes
Alianore Holland
Richard Fitzalan, 8th Earl of Arundel
Edmund Fitzalan, 9th Earl of Arundel
Alice of Saluzzo
Richard Fitzalan, 10th Earl of Arundel
William de Warenne
Alice de Warenne
Joan de Vere
Alice FitzAlan
Edmund Crouchback, 1st Earl of Lancaster
Henry, 3rd Earl of Lancaster
Blanche of Artois
Eleanor of Lancaster
Sir Patrick de Chaworth, Lord of Kidwelly
Maud Chaworth
Isabella de Beauchamp
