= Eleanor Holland (disambiguation) =

Eleanor Holland (or Alianore Holland) may refer to:

- Lady Alianore Holland, Countess of March (1373–1405), daughter of Thomas Holland, 2nd Earl of Kent and Lady Alice Fitzalan
- Lady Eleanor Holland, Countess of Salisbury (1386–after 1413), younger full sister of Lady Alianore
- Eleanor de Holland (c. 1406–?), illegitimate daughter of Constance of York and Edmund Holland, 4th Earl of Kent
