= Mohun =

Mohun may refer to:

Institutions

- Mohun Bagan AC an Indian sports club famous for its football team
  - Mohun Bagan Ground a sports ground used by that club
- Mohun (surname)
