= Roger Mortimer, 4th Earl of March =

English nobleman (1374–1398)

Roger Mortimer
- Earl of March; Earl of Ulster
- Arms of Mortimer: Barry of six or and azure, on a chief of the first two pallets between two gyrons of the second over all an inescutcheon argent
- Born: 11 April 1374; Usk, Monmouthshire
- Died: 20 July 1398 (aged 24); County Carlow, Ireland
- Noble family: Mortimer
- Spouse: Alianore Holland, Countess of March
- Issue: Anne Mortimer; Edmund Mortimer, 5th Earl of March; Roger Mortimer; Eleanor Mortimer
- Father: Edmund Mortimer, 3rd Earl of March
- Mother: Philippa, 5th Countess of Ulster

Arms of Mortimer, Earl of March: Quarterly 1st & 4th: Barry of six or and azure, on a chief of the first two pallets between two gyrons of the second over all an inescutcheon argent (Mortimer); 2nd & 3rd: Or a cross gules (de Burgh)

Roger de Mortimer, 4th Earl of March, 6th Earl of Ulster (11 April 1374 – 20 July 1398) was a great-grandson of King Edward III, descended from his second surviving son Lionel of Antwerp, Duke of Clarence, and was considered the heir presumptive to the childless King Richard II, his mother's first cousin. However, he predeceased Richard II by two years, albeit leaving issue, in whose line the claim to the crown continued. Although two years after Mortimer's death the crown was seized from King Richard II by the House of Lancaster, descended from the third son of King Edward III, the Mortimer claim to the throne was realised eventually by the House of York, descended in the male line from the fourth and most junior son of King Edward III, on the basis that they had married Anne Mortimer, the daughter and eventual sole heiress of Roger de Mortimer, 4th Earl of March. This claim to the crown by the House of York on the basis of their descent via a female line from the second son of King Edward III was the substance of the Wars of the Roses, as the ruling House of Lancaster was descended only from the third son of King Edward III, albeit in a direct male line.

Roger Mortimer's father, the 3rd Earl of March, died in 1381, leaving the six-year-old Roger to succeed to his father's title. The wardship and marriage of Roger was acquired by Thomas Holland, 2nd Earl of Kent, who married him off to his daughter Alianore. During his lifetime, Mortimer spent much time in Ireland; he served several tenures as Lord Lieutenant of Ireland and died during The Battle of Kellistown/ An Cath Cell Osnadha (County Carlow). He was succeeded by his young son, Edmund Mortimer, 5th Earl of March.

== Early life ==
Roger Mortimer was born 11 April 1374 at Usk in Monmouthshire. He was the eldest son of Edmund Mortimer, 3rd Earl of March, by his wife Philippa of Clarence, the daughter of Lionel of Antwerp, 1st Duke of Clarence (the second surviving son of King Edward III) by his wife Elizabeth de Burgh, 4th Countess of Ulster. Philippa passed on a strong claim to the English crown to her children. Roger had a younger brother, Edmund Mortimer, and two sisters, Elizabeth, who married Henry 'Hotspur' Percy, and Philippa, who first married John Hastings, 3rd Earl of Pembroke, secondly Richard de Arundel, 11th Earl of Arundel, and thirdly Sir Thomas Poynings.

=== Wardship ===
According to R. R. Davies, the wardship of such an important heir was an "issue of political moment in the years 1382–4". Eventually, on 16 December 1383, Mortimer's estates in England and Wales were granted for £4000 per annum to a consortium consisting of Mortimer himself, the Earls of Arundel, Northumberland, and Warwick, and John, Lord Neville. The guardianship of Mortimer's person was initially granted to Arundel, but in August 1384, at the behest of Joan of Kent, the mother of King Richard II, Mortimer's wardship and marriage were granted for 6000 marks to Thomas Holland, 2nd Earl of Kent, Joan's son and Richard's half-brother. On or about 7 October 1388, at the age of 14, Mortimer was married off to his warder's 18-year-old daughter Eleanor Holland, King Richard II's half-niece. Mortimer did homage and was granted livery of his lands in Ireland on 18 June 1393, and of those in England and Wales on 25 February 1394.

King Richard had no issue. Mortimer, a lineal descendant of Edward III, was next in line to the throne and married to his half-niece. G. E. Cokayne states that in October 1385 Mortimer was proclaimed by the king as heir presumptive to the crown. However, according to R. R. Davies, the story that Richard publicly proclaimed Mortimer as heir presumptive in Parliament in October 1385 is baseless, although contemporary records indicate that his claim was openly discussed at the time. He was knighted by King Richard II on 23 April 1390.

== Career ==
After he came of age, Mortimer spent much of his time in Ireland. King Richard had first made Mortimer his Lord Lieutenant of Ireland on 24 January 1382 when he was a child of seven, with his uncle, Sir Thomas Mortimer, acting as his deputy. The king reappointed Roger Mortimer as his lieutenant in Ireland on 23 July 1392, and in September 1394, Although he was nominally the king's lieutenant, he made little headway against the native Irish chieftains. On 25 April 1396, the king appointed him lieutenant in Ulster, Connacht, and Meath, and Mortimer was in Ireland for most of the following three years. In April 1397, the king reappointed him as lieutenant for a further three years.

Mortimer's residence in Ireland ensured that his political role in England was a minor one. His closest relationships in England appear to have been with family members, including his brother, Edmund, to whom he granted lands and annuities; the Percy family, into which his elder sister Elizabeth had married; and the Earl of Arundel, who had married his younger sister, Philippa.

As Davies points out, Mortimer's "wealth and lineage meant that, sooner or later, he would be caught up in the political turmoil of Richard II's last years." On 4 September 1397, he was ordered to arrest his uncle, Sir Thomas Mortimer, for treason regarding his actions at the Battle of Radcot Bridge, but made no real attempt to do so. Even more inauspiciously, when summoned to a Parliament at Shrewsbury in January 1398, he was 'rapturously received', according to Adam Usk and the Wigmore chronicler, by a vast crowd of supporters wearing his colours. These events excited the king's suspicions, and on Mortimer's return to Ireland after the Parliament in January 1398, 'his enemy, the Duke of Surrey, his brother-in-law, was ordered to follow and capture him'.

=== Death ===
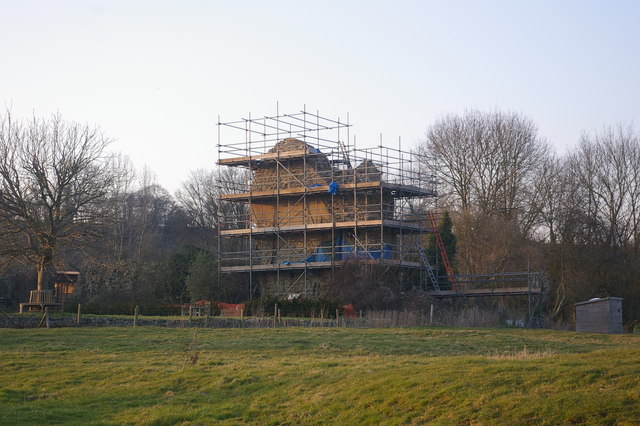
Remains of Wigmore Abbey, burial place of the Earls of March

On 20 July 1398, at the age of 24, Mortimer was slain at The Battle of Kellistown (County Carlow). The Wigmore chronicler says that he was riding in front of his army, unattended and wearing Irish garb, possibly illegally, and that those who slew him did not know who he was. He was interred at Wigmore Abbey. The King went to Ireland in the following year to avenge Mortimer's death.

Mortimer's young son, Edmund, succeeded him in the title and claim to the throne. The Wigmore chronicler, while criticising Mortimer for lust and remissness in his duty to God, extols him as "of approved honesty, active in knightly exercises, glorious in pleasantry, affable and merry in conversation, excelling his contemporaries in the beauty of appearance, sumptuous in his feasting, and liberal in his gifts".

== Marriage and children ==
By his wife Alianore Holland he had two sons and two daughters:

- Anne Mortimer (1388–1411) (born when her father was aged 14) who married Richard of Conisburgh, 3rd Earl of Cambridge (1385–1415), of the House of York (her paternal grandmother's first cousin), a grandson of King Edward III (Anne herself being a great-great-granddaughter of King Edward III). Anne Mortimer's grandsons were King Edward IV and King Richard III.
- Edmund Mortimer, 5th Earl of March (1391–1425)
- Roger Mortimer (23 April 1393 – c. 1409)
- Eleanor Mortimer (born 1395–1422), who married Sir Edward de Courtenay (died 1418), and had no issue. Married secondly John Harpeden.

In June 1399, Roger Mortimer's widow, Alianor, married Edward Charleton, 5th Baron Cherleton, by whom she had two daughters:

- Joan, who married John Grey, 1st Earl of Tankerville, brother of Sir Thomas Grey, executed for his part in the Southampton Plot which aimed to replace King Henry V with Eleanor's son, Edmund Mortimer, 5th Earl of March. Joan was co-heiress in 1425 to her half-brother, Edmund Mortimer, 5th Earl of March.
- Joyce, who married John Tiptoft, 1st Baron Tiptoft.

Alianor died on 6 or 18 October 1405.

== Ancestry ==
Ancestors of Roger Mortimer, 4th Earl of March

8. Sir Edmund Mortimer
4. Roger Mortimer, 2nd Earl of March
9. Elizabeth de Badlesmere
2. Edmund Mortimer, 3rd Earl of March
10. William Montacute, 1st Earl of Salisbury
5. Philippa Montacute
11. Catherine Montacute, Countess of Salisbury
1. Roger Mortimer, 4th Earl of March
12. Edward III of England
6. Lionel of Antwerp, 1st Duke of Clarence
13. Philippa of Hainault
3. Philippa of Clarence, 5th Countess of Ulster
14. William Donn de Burgh, 3rd Earl of Ulster
7. Elizabeth de Burgh, 4th Countess of Ulster
15. Maud of Lancaster

== Notes ==
Roger Mortimer, 4th Earl of March House of Plantagenet Born: 11 April 1374 Died: 20 July 1398
Peerage of England
Preceded by Edmund Mortimer	Earl of March; 1381–1398	Succeeded by Edmund Mortimer
Peerage of Ireland
Preceded by Philippa with Edmund Mortimer	Earl of Ulster; 1382–1398	Succeeded by Edmund Mortimer
