= Southampton Plot =

Conspiracy to depose King Henry V of England, revealed in 1415

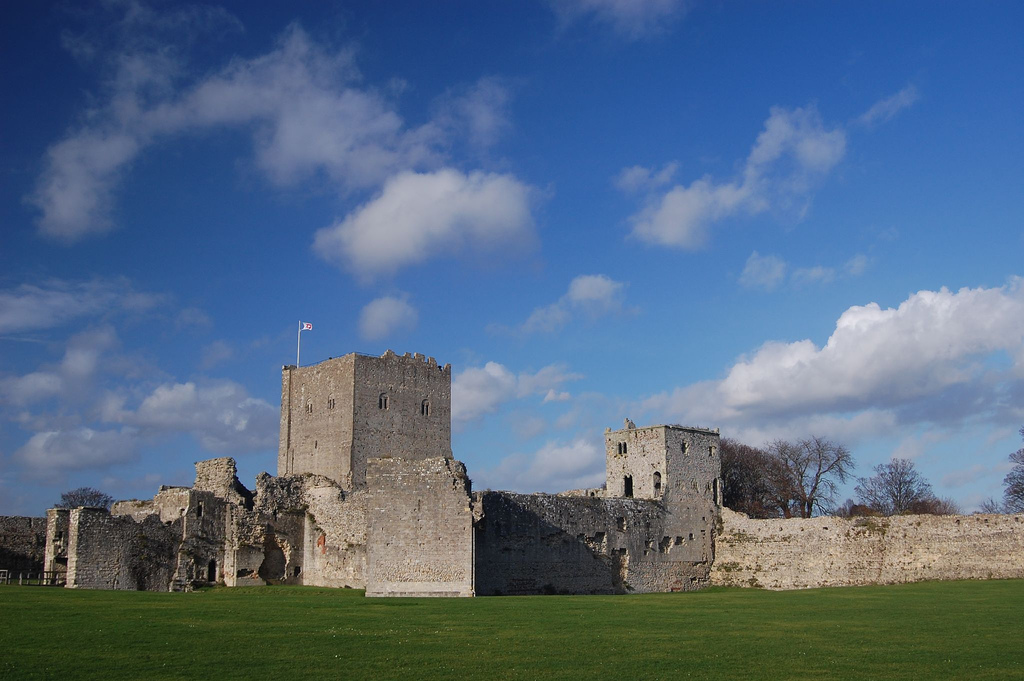
Portchester Castle, where the Southampton Plot was revealed to King Henry V

The Southampton Plot was a conspiracy to depose King Henry V of England, revealed in 1415 just as the King was about to sail on campaign to France as part of the Hundred Years' War. The plan was to replace him with Edmund Mortimer, 5th Earl of March.

== Overview ==
Edmund Mortimer, 5th Earl of March, was the great-grandson of Lionel of Antwerp, Duke of Clarence, second surviving son of King Edward III, and his claim to the throne was thus superior, should one allow female intermediaries (he was the grandson of Philippa of Clarence, daughter of Lionel), to that of Henry V and his father, Henry IV, who derived their claim from Henry IV's father, John of Gaunt, third surviving son of Edward III. Moreover, Edmund Mortimer's father, Roger Mortimer, 4th Earl of March, had been widely considered heir presumptive to King Richard II, who had no issue, and Edmund Mortimer himself had been heir presumptive to Richard II while a young child.

The three ringleaders of the plot were Edmund Mortimer's brother-in-law, Richard of Conisburgh, 3rd Earl of Cambridge (also a grandson of Edward III through his fourth surviving son, Edmund of Langley, and thus also Mortimer's first cousin twice removed), who was the stepson of Scrope's wife, Joan Holland, the aunt of Edmund Mortimer; Henry Scrope, 3rd Baron Scrope of Masham (whose uncle Richard le Scrope had been executed for his part in a 1405 revolt); and Sir Thomas Grey, who descended through Joan of Lancaster from both Henry II and Eleanor of Aquitaine, and whose son, Thomas, had been betrothed in 1412 to Cambridge's only daughter, Isabel.

The nominal principal, the Earl of March, informed King Henry of the plot on 31 July, stating that he had only just become aware of it. Richard, Scrope, and Grey were promptly arrested. The trial took place in Southampton; traditionally it is claimed that trial took place on the site now occupied by the Red Lion Inn, but there are no contemporary records of this. Grey was beheaded on 2 August and the two peers on 5 August, both in front of the Bargate. Satisfied, Henry sailed for France on 11 August.

Scrope's involvement in the conspiracy surprised contemporaries, and continues to puzzle historians, as he was a royal favourite. Ian Mortimer claims Scrope had merely insinuated himself into the confidence of Cambridge and Grey to betray the conspiracy, just as Edward, Duke of York had done with the Epiphany Rising in 1400, but was forestalled by Mortimer's revelation of the conspiracy to the King on 31 July. Pugh, however, finds Scrope's exculpatory statements at trial unconvincing, and states that Scrope never pretended that he had intended to inform the King of the conspiracy. Pugh also contends that "there was no plot in 1415 to assassinate Henry V and his three brothers and that heinous charge, by far the most sensational in the indictment, was fabricated to ensure that Cambridge, Grey and Scrope did not escape the death penalty as a well-deserved punishment for the various other offences that they undoubtedly had committed".

== Aftermath ==
With the death of the Duke of York, the Earl of Cambridge's elder brother, at the Battle of Agincourt later that year, Cambridge's son Richard Plantagenet became heir to the title, which would eventually be returned to him after Henry V's death. Through his mother, he also inherited the Mortimer claim to the throne on the Earl of March's death; later in life Richard would use this claim to try to dethrone King Henry VI.

== Dramatisation ==
The Southampton Plot is dramatised in Shakespeare's Henry V, in which it is portrayed as a French-financed betrayal of the king to stop Henry's invasion plans. It is also portrayed in the anonymous play, The History of Sir John Oldcastle (c.1600) and in William Kenrick's Falstaff's Wedding (1760).

The Southampton Plot is shown in The King (2019 film).
