= Philippa Mohun =

Philippa de Mohun
- Duchess of York
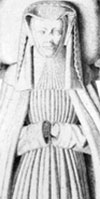
- Effigy in Chapel of St Nicholas, Westminster Abbey, of Philippa de Mohun (d.1431), Duchess of York. Detail from etching of drawing by Charles Stothard (1786-1821), published in The Monumental Effigies of Great Britain (London, 1817).
- Born: c. 1367
- Died: 17 July 1431; Carisbrooke Castle, Isle of Wight
- Burial: Westminster Abbey, London
- Spouse: Walter Fitzwalter, 3rd Baron Fitzwalter; Sir John Golafre Edward of Norwich, 2nd Duke of York (m. 1398; died 1415)
- Father: John de Mohun, 2nd Baron Mohun
- Mother: Joan Burghersh

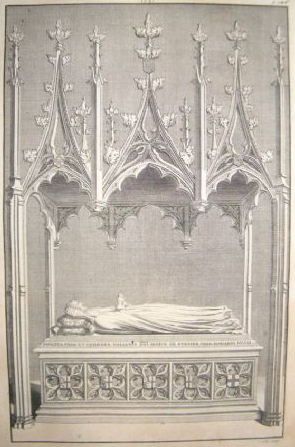
1723 engraving of monument to Philippa de Mohun (d.1431), Duchess of York, in Westminster Abbey. The wooden canopy is now missing. Published in Dart, John, Westmonasterium, or, The History and Antiquities of the Abbey Church of St Peter, Westminster, London, 1723

Philippa de Mohun (c. 1367 – 17 July 1431) was Duchess of York, as a result of her third marriage to Edward of Norwich, 2nd Duke of York (c.1373–1415), Lord of the Isle of Wight, a grandson of King Edward III (1327–1377). She succeeded her third husband as Lady of the Isle of Wight (1415–1431).

== Origins ==
Philippa's birthdate is unknown. She was the third daughter and co-heiress of John Mohun, 2nd Baron Mohun (c.1320–1375), KG, one of the Founding Knights of the Order of the Garter, feudal baron of Dunster, of Dunster Castle, Somerset, by his wife Joan Burghersh (d.1404), daughter of Bartholomew de Burghersh, 1st Baron Burghersh (c.1304–1355).

== Inheritance ==
Although her father was the last in the male line of Mohun of Dunster (for he died without male issue), neither she nor either of her sisters inherited their paternal estates at Dunster. (These lands had been held by the family since before the Domesday Book of 1086.) This was because her mother Lady Mohun (died 1404) had sold the reversion of the estates in 1374 to Lady Elizabeth Luttrell (d.1395), wife of Sir Andrew Luttrell and a daughter of Hugh de Courtenay, 2nd Earl of Devon (1303–1377). The Luttrell family and their later descendants in a female line from 1737 owned Dunster Castle until 1976, when it was donated to the National Trust.

== Marriages and progeny ==
Philippa married three times:

- First to Walter Fitzwalter, 4th Baron Fitzwalter (d. 26 September 1386); this marriage produced one son named Walter, 5th Baron Fitzwalter (d. 1407) mentioned in his mother's will.
- Secondly to Sir John Golafre (d. 18 November 1396), the bastard son of Sir John Golafre (d.1379) of Sarsden in Oxfordshire, Bury Blunsdon in Wiltshire, Fyfield in Garford and Frilford in Berkshire, eldest son of Sir John Golafre (d.1363), MP. He was a favoured knight of the chamber of King Richard II (1377–1399) and was Constable of Wallingford Castle. He was a notable jouster. He died on 18 November 1396 and at the king's order was buried in the royal chapel in Westminster Abbey.
- Thirdly, before 7 October 1398, to Edward of Norwich, 2nd Duke of York (c.1373 – 25 October 1415), eldest son of Edmund of Langley, 1st Duke of York, by his first wife Isabella of Castile, and a grandson of King Edward III. By her third marriage Philippa became Duchess of York. Following Edward's death at the Battle of Agincourt she received a grant for life of the Lordship of the Isle of Wight, previously held by her husband, and on 10 December 1415 was styled Lady of the Isle of Wight.

== Death and burial ==
Philippa died 17 July 1431 at her seat of Carisbrooke Castle on the Isle of Wight and was buried in Westminster Abbey, where her chest tomb and effigy survive in the Chapel of St Nicholas. Also buried in Westminster Abbey was her second husband Sir John Golafre (d.1396), who was interred in the royal chapel, his grave marked by a monumental brass now lost. Her mother, Lady Joan Burghersh de Mohun was buried at Canterbury Cathedral, where she established a chantry and her tomb is still located.

== Monument in Westminster Abbey ==
Her monument is today situated in the north-west corner of the Chapel of St Nicholas, Westminster Abbey, with one side against the chapel's screen, but before 1600 was situated in the centre of the chapel. In effigy, recumbent upon a freestone chest tomb, Philippa wears a long cloak with widow's hood, the head resting on two cushions. The original paintwork which once covered effigy and base has almost completely worn away. The hands are missing. On the two visible sides of the base are sculpted seven heraldic shields:

- Two of Mohun (Or, a cross engrailed sable);
- Royal arms of England;
- Mohun impaling Burghersh (Gules, a lion rampant double queued or), for her father;
- FitzWalter impaling Mohun, for her first husband;
- Golafre (Barry wavy argent and gules, on a bend sable three bezants) impaling Mohun, for her second husband;,
- Royal arms of England impaling Mohun, for her third husband.

In 1723 the monument had an elaborately carved wooden canopy above it, since removed, as is illustrated in John Dart's history of the Abbey published in that year, but a tester in the Abbey's collection may have come from this monument. The Latin inscription, of which only two words now survive, was recorded in a work on the Abbey's history published in 1822 as follows: (translated): "Philippa daughter and co-heir of John Lord Mohun of Dunster who died Anno Domini 1431". An earlier work stated the inscription to have included also the words: "wife of Edward Duke of York".

== Last will and testament ==
The text of the last will of Philippa de Mohun (in French) was published by Richard Gough in 1780. In it she mentioned her son Walter, Lord Fitzwalter and bequeathed money to several charities and to Thomas Chaucer. Her last will and testament was dated at Carisbrooke Castle. She appointed that her body should be interred in Westminster Abbey, and directed further as follows:

"At the place where she died, and at every place where her body rested in its way to Westminster, she directs that her Exequies be performed with Dirge over night, and before the removal thereof in the morning, a Mass of Requiem; each Priest assisting at the said service to receive 12... and that twenty marks, more or less, be spent and distributed on the road, in masses, alms, and other charges: that being arrived at Westminster, twenty-four poor men, clothed in long gowns, and black hoods, each bear a torch at the Dirge, and at the Mass of Requiem in the morning, each to receive 20... in money: the herse to be covered all over with black, and a very handsome herse of wax of the same proportion set on it; and on the day of the funeral, six marks and 40... to be distributed between one thousand poor men and women, a penny to each. A thousand Dirges to be sung on the first day, and the thousand Masses the next; and to each Priest 4d, as soon as possible, for her soul and all Christians; 1 3s. 4d. to two men for their trouble in distributing money at the Dirges and Masses: to the Abbot and Prior of Westminster, each 13s. 4.... on the day of the Dirge, and on the next day 6s. 1d. and to each Monk 3s. 4d.; and to each Priest coming to the funeral for Dirge and to sing Mass, 1s. 2d.; £20 to buy russet cloth for cloaks and hoods for one hundred poor men and women; twenty marks to two honest Priests to say Mass and St. Gregory's Trentall for her soul and all Christians a whole year; to fourscore poor men and women bedridden £13 6s. 9d; £20 or more, at the discretion of her executors, for the expense of her funeral, and £20 to buy black cloth for her household the day of her funeral. She left money to the Monasteries of Christchurch, Canterbury, Chertsey, Barking, and Stratford, to pray for her soul; also to the Nuns of Brimham and Goryng, and the College of Fotheryngay, and to every house of the four orders of the Friars in London coming to her funeral, 20... Among legacies of plate, she remembers her son Walter, Lord Fitz-Walter, and leaves one hundred marks to Thomas Chaucer. The residue of her goods to be divided into four portions for Masses, relief of Prisoners, and Poor, and repair of Roads."
