= John Mohun, 2nd Baron Mohun =

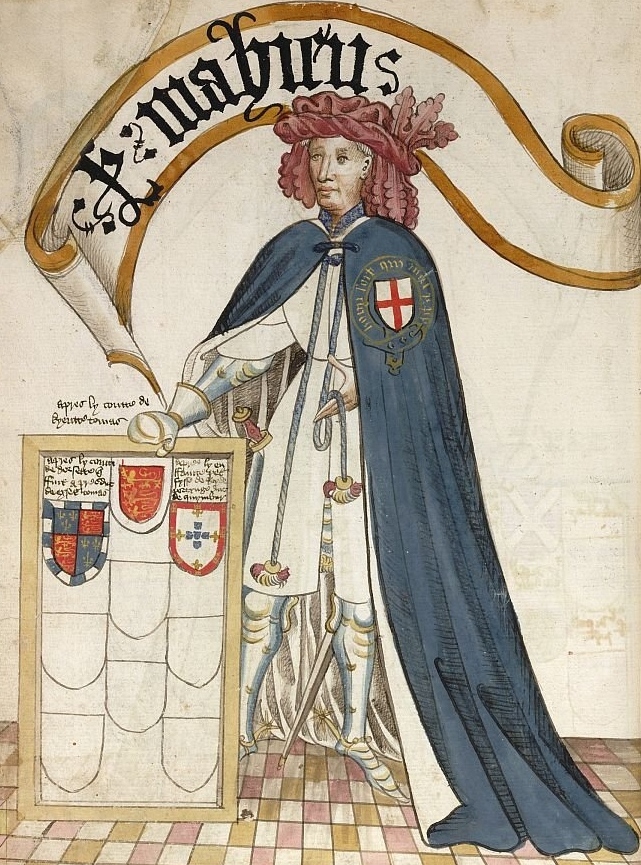

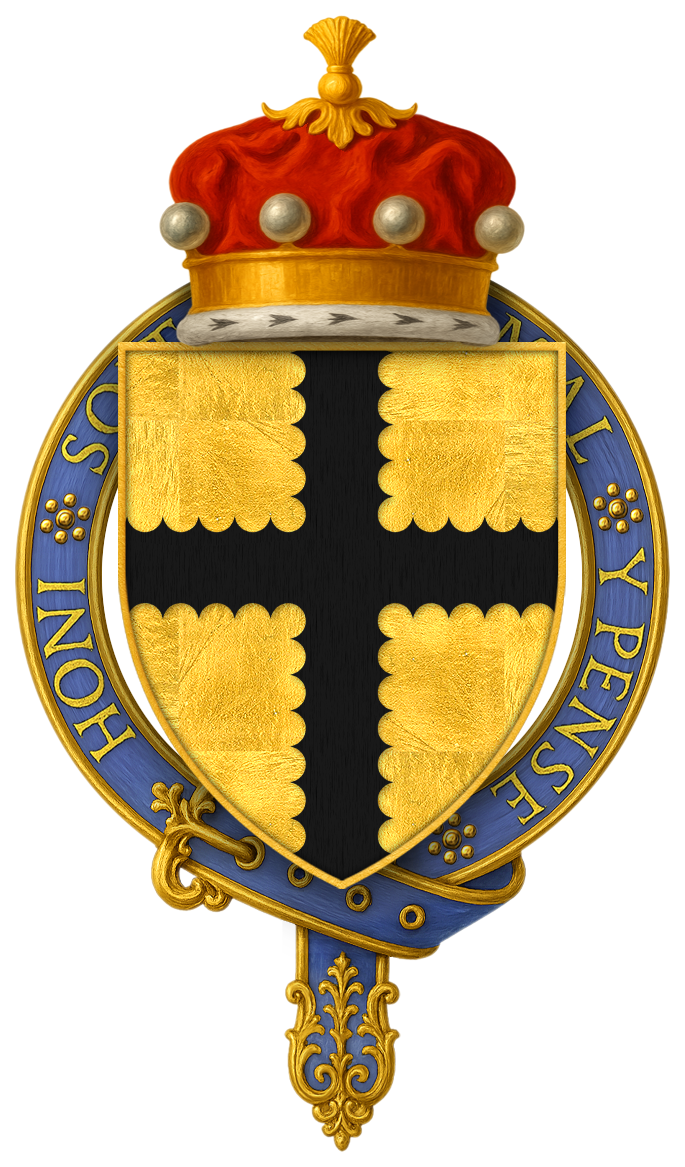
Arms of Sir John de Mohun, 2nd Baron Mohun, KG -- or a cross engrailed sable

John (V) de Mohun, 2nd Baron Mohun, 9th feudal baron of Dunster, KG (1320–1376) was a founder member and the 11th Knight of the Most Noble Order of the Garter in 1348.

== Life ==
John was the last in the senior male line of Mohun of Dunster. He was the son of John de Mohun (eldest son of John Mohun, 1st Baron Mohun), who predeceased his father, having fought at the Battle of Boroughbridge in 1322 and died some time after in Scotland. He was grandson of John de Mohun, 1st Baron Mohun and Sibyll Segrave; daughter of John Segrave, 2nd Baron Segrave – son of Nicholas de Segrave, 1st Baron Segrave. His grandfather was Sire John de Mohun of Dunster, banneret, became the first Baron Mohun in 1299, and sealed the Barons' Letter to the Pope in 1301; he bore at the Battle of Falkirk (1298), and at the Siege of Carlaverock (1300).

In 1328 and 1331, he served in the Kings service in Brittany, with Sir Bartholemew de Burghersh. In 1332, he attended Edward Prince of Wales KG, when Edward III KG entered France by Normandy, and continued in service at the Siege of Calais, and again in 1333. His last recorded military service was in attendance to the Prince of Wales into Gascony in 1341.

He died on 14 September 1376, leaving no sons, and was buried in Bruton priory.

== Heraldry ==
His Arms were Or, a cross engrailed sable. His son bore the same with a label of three points gules.

== Family ==
After the death of his grandfather (Sire John), John inherited the vast family estates at the age of 10, held by Henry Burghersh Bishop of Lincoln, until he came of age. He married Joan, daughter of Sir Bartholomew Burghersh the elder, who was the sister of Bartholomew the younger KG, one of the founders of the Garter.

He had 3 daughters and co-heirs:

- Elizabeth, wife of William Montagu, 2nd Earl of Salisbury
- Philippa firstly wife of Walter FitzWalter Lord FitzWalter, and then wife of Edward, Duke of York
- Maud, wife of John le Strange, 6th Baron Strange.

Maud's son Richard inherited the family estates after the deaths of his aunts, Elizabeth and Philippa, both of whom died without issue.

== Notes ==
Peerage of England
| Preceded by John Mohun | Baron Mohun; 1330–1375 | Succeeded by Richard Strange |
