= Edmund Mortimer, 5th Earl of March =

15th-century English noble

Edmund Mortimer
- Earl of March and of Ulster
- Successor: Richard, 3rd Duke of York
- Born: 6 November 1391; New Forest, Westmeath
- Died: 18 January 1425 (aged 33); Trim Castle
- Buried: Clare Priory, Suffolk
- Family: Mortimer
- Spouse: Anne Stafford (m. 1415)
- Father: Roger Mortimer, 4th Earl of March
- Mother: Eleanor Holland

Arms of Mortimer: Barry or and azure, on a chief of the first two pallets between two base esquires of the second over all an inescutcheon argent

Edmund Mortimer, 5th Earl of March, 7th Earl of Ulster (6 November 1391 – 18 January 1425), was an English nobleman and a potential claimant to the throne of England. A great-great-grandson of King Edward III of England, he was heir presumptive to King Richard II of England (both his paternal first cousin twice removed and maternal half grand-uncle) when the latter was deposed in favour of Henry IV. Edmund Mortimer's claim to the throne was the basis of rebellions and plots against Henry IV and his son Henry V, and was later taken up by the House of York in the Wars of the Roses, though Mortimer himself was an important and loyal vassal of Henry V and Henry VI. Edmund was the last Earl of March of the Mortimer family.

== Early life ==
Edmund Mortimer, 5th Earl of March, was born at New Forest, Westmeath, one of his family's Irish estates, on 6 November 1391, the son of Roger Mortimer, 4th Earl of March, and Eleanor Holland. He had a younger brother, Roger (1393 – c. 1413), and two sisters: Anne, who married Richard, Earl of Cambridge, younger son of the Duke of York (executed 1415), and Eleanor, who married Sir Edward de Courtenay (d. 1418), and had no issue.

Edmund Mortimer's mother was the daughter of Thomas Holland, 2nd Earl of Kent, and Alice FitzAlan. Thomas Holland's mother, Joan of Kent, a granddaughter of Edward I, was the mother of Richard II by her second marriage; Alice Fitzalan was the daughter of Richard FitzAlan, 3rd Earl of Arundel, and his second wife, Eleanor, daughter of Henry, 3rd Earl of Lancaster, grandson of King Henry III.

Edmund Mortimer was thus a descendant of Henry III and Edward I and a half-grandnephew of Richard II through his mother, and more importantly a descendant of King Edward III through his paternal grandmother Philippa of Clarence, only child of King Edward III's second surviving son, Lionel of Antwerp, Duke of Clarence. Because King Richard II had no issue, Edmund's father, Roger Mortimer, 4th Earl of March, was heir presumptive during his lifetime, and at his death in Ireland on 20 July 1398 his place in the succession fell to his eldest son, Edmund. Thus, in terms of male primogeniture Edmund was heir-presumptive to the throne over and above the house of Lancaster, the children of Edward III's third son John of Gaunt, Duke of Lancaster.

However, on 30 September 1399, when Edmund Mortimer was not yet eight years of age, his fortunes changed entirely. Richard II was deposed by Henry Bolingbroke, the new Duke of Lancaster, who became King Henry IV and had his own son, the future King Henry V, recognized as heir apparent at his first Parliament. The King put the young Edmund and his brother Roger in the custody of Sir Hugh Waterton at Windsor and Berkhamsted castles, but they were treated honourably, and for part of the time brought up with the King's own children, John and Philippa.

== Rebellion against Henry IV ==
On 22 June 1402, Edmund's uncle, Sir Edmund Mortimer, son of the 3rd Earl, was captured by the Welsh rebel leader, Owain Glyndŵr, at the Battle of Bryn Glas. Henry IV accused Sir Edmund of deserting to Glyndŵr, refused to ransom him, and confiscated his property. Sir Edmund then married Glyndŵr's daughter, and on 13 December 1402 proclaimed in writing that his nephew Edmund was the rightful heir to King Richard II.

Sir Edmund's sister, Edmund's aunt, was married to Henry "Hotspur" Percy, son of the Earl of Northumberland. In 1403, the Percys rose in rebellion in collusion with Glyndŵr and Sir Edmund. Hotspur was defeated and slain at Shrewsbury.

The alliance of Glyndŵr, Sir Edmund, and the Percys survived this setback. In the Tripartite Indenture of February 1405, they agreed to a three-way division of the kingdom. This agreement was apparently connected to a plot to free Edmund and his brother Roger from King Henry's custody and carry them into Wales. On 13 February 1405, the boys were abducted from Windsor Castle, but they were quickly recaptured near Cheltenham. Constance of York was held responsible and arrested. She implicated her brother, the Duke of York, who was imprisoned at Pevensey Castle for seventeen weeks. As a result of the failed abduction, on 1 February 1406, Edmund and Roger were put under stricter supervision at Pevensey Castle under Sir John Pelham (d.1429), where they remained until 1409. On 1 February 1409 Edmund and Roger were given in charge to the King's son, the Prince of Wales, who was only five years older than Edmund. They remained in custody for the remainder of Henry IV's reign.

Edmund Mortimer's sisters, Anne and Eleanor, who were in the care of their mother until her death in 1405, were not well treated by Henry IV, and were described as 'destitute' after her death.

== Reign of Henry V ==
On his accession in 1413 Henry V set Edmund Mortimer at liberty, and on 8 April 1413, the day before the new King's coronation, Edmund Mortimer and his brother Roger were made Knights of the Bath.

On 9 June 1413, the King granted Edmund Mortimer livery of his estates. Henry IV's Queen, Joan of Navarre, had been granted authority over Edmund's marriage on 24 February 1408, but she later ceded this to Henry while Prince of Wales. On 17 January 1415 Edmund obtained a papal dispensation to marry 'a fit woman' related to him in the third degree of kindred or affinity. This allowed him to marry his second cousin once removed, Anne Stafford, the daughter of Anne of Gloucester and Edmund Stafford, 5th Earl of Stafford. Like Mortimer, she was a descendant of Edward III. The King was displeased, and imposed an enormous fine of 10,000 marks.

Despite this momentary discord, Edmund Mortimer was entirely loyal to Henry V. He never made any claim to the throne, despite being senior in descent.

On 16 April 1415 Mortimer was present at the council which determined on war with France, and on 24 July 1415, he was a witness to the King's will.

While preparations for the invasion were underway, some discontented nobles launched the Southampton Plot, to take Mortimer to Wales and proclaim him king. The chief plotter was his sister Anne's husband, the Earl of Cambridge. When Mortimer was made privy to this plan, he revealed the conspiracy to the King at Portchester on 31 July. Afterwards, he sat on the commission which condemned Cambridge and the other conspirators to death; they were beheaded on 2 and 5 August. On 7 August, the King formally pardoned Mortimer for any nominal involvement in the plot.

Mortimer was deeply in debt when he accompanied Henry V's forces to France. He took part in several campaigns in Normandy, including the Siege of Harfleur, where he contracted dysentery, and was forced to return to England. On 15 August 1416 he was appointed a captain of the expedition sent to relieve Harfleur under John, Duke of Bedford, and Sir Walter Hungerford, and was with the army which conquered Normandy in 1417 and 1418. In July 1420 he was at the siege of Melun.

In February 1421 Mortimer accompanied the King back to England with his bride, Catherine of Valois, and bore the sceptre at Catherine's coronation on 21 February. He returned to France with Henry V in June 1421, and was at the Siege of Meaux, where the King fell mortally ill, dying on 31 August 1422.

== Final years ==
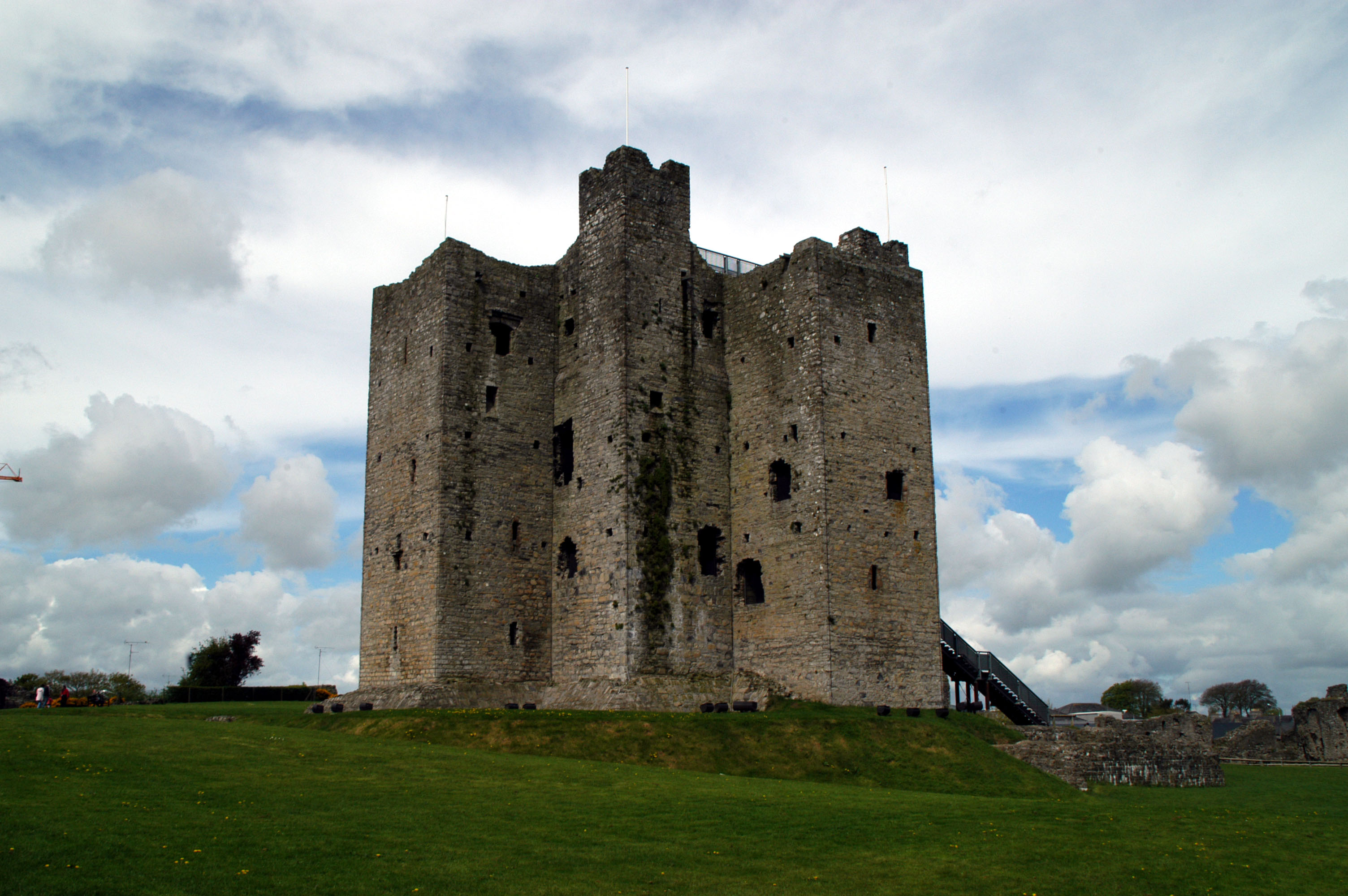
Trim Castle

Henry V was succeeded by his nine-month-old son, King Henry VI, and on 9 December 1422 Mortimer was appointed to the Regency Council of the regency government, 1422–1437.

On 9 May 1423 he was appointed the King's lieutenant in Ireland for nine years, but at first exercised his authority through a deputy, Edward Dantsey, Bishop of Meath, and remained in England. However, after a violent quarrel with the King's uncle Humphrey, Duke of Gloucester, and the execution of his kinsman, Sir John Mortimer, Mortimer was "sent out of the way to Ireland". He arrived there in the autumn of 1424, and on 18 or 19 January 1425 died of plague at Trim Castle. He was buried at Stoke-by-Clare, Suffolk, where he had founded a college of secular canons in 1414.

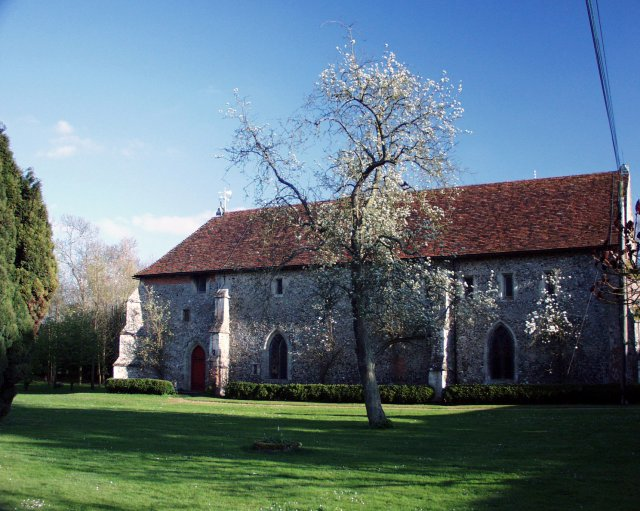
Clare Priory, burial place of Edmund Mortimer

Mortimer had no issue, and at his death the Mortimer line of the Earls of March became extinct. The heir to his estates and titles was the son of his sister Anne and the Earl of Cambridge, Richard of York, 3rd Duke of York (1411–1460). Richard also inherited Mortimer's claim to the throne, which he eventually raised, causing the Wars of the Roses.

His widow, Anne, married, before 6 March 1427, John Holland, 2nd Duke of Exeter. She died on 20 or 24 September 1432, and was buried in the church of St Katharine's by the Tower.

The Wigmore chronicle describes Edmund Mortimer as "severe in his morals, composed in his acts, circumspect in his talk, and wise and cautious during the days of his adversity".

== Shakespeare and the Mortimers ==
William Shakespeare dramatized events in the life of Edmund Mortimer, 5th Earl of March's uncle Sir Edmund Mortimer in Henry IV, Part 1. Although Shakespeare accurately identifies the Sir Edmund Mortimer as Hotspur's brother-in-law, he incorrectly refers to Sir Edmund Mortlmer by the title "Earl of March", thus conflating him with Edmund Mortimer, 5th Earl of March.

The Southampton Plot is dramatized in Shakespeare's play Henry V. However, its intent is misstated, and Mortimer's role in exposing it and condemning the plotters is completely omitted.

Edmund Mortimer also appears in Henry VI, Part 1. He is incorrectly depicted as an old man who has been imprisoned in the Tower of London since the rise of Henry IV. Furthermore, in an entirely fictional scene, Mortimer explains to his nephew Richard their family's claim to the throne, praises the efforts of Richard's father to make Mortimer king, and urges Richard to pursue his own claim to the throne. In reality, Richard was thirteen years old when his uncle died, and at the time was being raised in the north of England as a ward of the crown by Ralph Neville, 1st Earl of Westmorland.

== Ancestry ==
Ancestors of Edmund Mortimer, 5th Earl of March

8. Roger Mortimer, 2nd Earl of March
4. Edmund Mortimer, 3rd Earl of March
9. Philippa Montacute
2. Roger Mortimer, 4th Earl of March
10. Lionel of Antwerp, Duke of Clarence
5. Philippa, 5th Countess of Ulster
11. Elizabeth de Burgh, 4th Countess of Ulster
1. Edmund Mortimer
12. Thomas Holland, 1st Earl of Kent
6. Thomas Holland, 2nd Earl of Kent
13. Joan of Kent
3. Alianore Holland
14. Richard Fitzalan, 10th Earl of Arundel
7. Alice Fitzalan
15. Eleanor of Lancaster

== Notes ==
Edmund Mortimer, 5th Earl of March House of Mortimer Born: 6 November 1391 Died: 18 January 1425
Peerage of England
Preceded by Roger Mortimer	Earl of March; 1398–1425	Succeeded by Richard of York
Peerage of Ireland
Preceded by Roger Mortimer	Earl of Ulster; 1398–1425	Succeeded by Richard of York
