= Thomas Grey (conspirator) =

English nobleman and conspirator in the Southampton Plot (1415)

Sir Thomas Grey
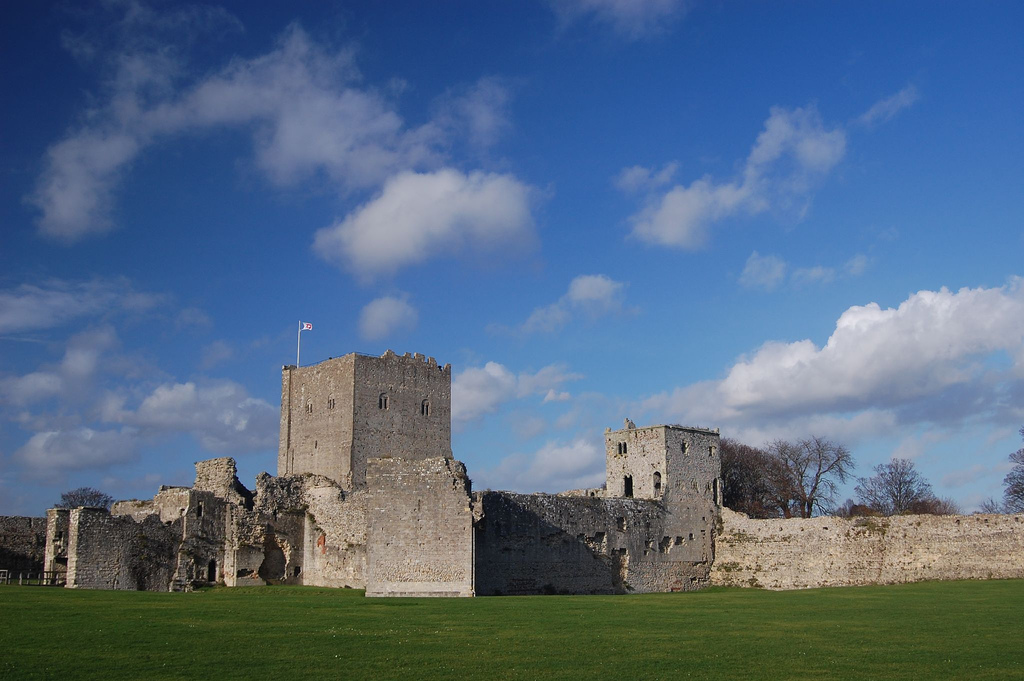
- Portchester Castle, where the Southampton plot was revealed to King Henry V
- Born: 30 November 1384; Alnwick Castle, Northumberland
- Died: 2 August 1415 (aged 30); Southampton, Hampshire
- Spouse: Alice Neville
- Issue: Sir Thomas Grey; Sir Ralph Grey; Sir John Grey; William Grey daughter whose first name is unknown Joan Grey; Elizabeth Grey; Margaret Grey
- Father: Sir Thomas Grey
- Mother: Joan Mowbray

Sir Thomas Grey (30 November 1384 – 2 August 1415), of Heaton Castle in the parish of Norham, Northumberland, was one of the three conspirators in the failed Southampton Plot against King Henry V in 1415, for which he was executed.

== Family of origin ==
Sir Thomas Grey, born 30 November 1384 in 'le Midyllgathouse' at Alnwick Castle, seat of the Percys, Earls of Northumberland, came from a family long prominent among the nobility in the border region of Northumberland.

Grey was the eldest son and heir of Sir Thomas Grey (1359 – 26 November 1400) of Heton near Norham, Northumberland, by his wife, Joan Mowbray (d. 1410). Grey's mother Joan Mowbray was sister of Thomas de Mowbray, 1st Duke of Norfolk, and daughter of John de Mowbray, 4th Baron Mowbray (d. 17 June 1368), and Elizabeth de Segrave, daughter and heiress of John de Segrave, 4th Baron Segrave. Through his mother, a granddaughter of Margaret, Duchess of Norfolk (d. 1399), Sir Thomas Grey was a descendant of King Edward I. His paternal grandparents were the soldier and chronicler Sir Thomas Grey of Heton, and Margaret, daughter and heiress of William de Pressene of Presson.

He had three brothers and a sister:

- John Grey, 1st Earl of Tankerville (d. 1421), who married Joan de Cherleton, stepsister of Edmund Mortimer, 5th Earl of March.
- Sir Henry Grey of Ketteringham, Norfolk, who married Emme Appleyard.
- William Grey, Dean of York and Bishop of London (1426) (d. 1436).
- Matilda Grey (1382 – 22 August 1451), who married Sir Robert Ogle (d. 12 August 1436) of Ogle, Northumberland, by whom she had children.

== Life ==
Grey's father, Sir Thomas Grey (1359–1400), and Sir Thomas Erpingham, were among those chosen allies of Henry Bolingbroke to witness the abdication of King Richard II in Westminster Hall on 29 September 1399.

Grey was only 16 years of age when he succeeded his father in 1400, and was shown great favour in the early years of the reign of Henry IV, including the grant of the wardship of his own inheritance while he was under age. By August 1404 he had been retained for life by Ralph Neville, 1st Earl of Westmorland, but by May 1408 was in the service of Henry, Prince of Wales.

Sir Thomas Grey married, before 20 February 1408, Lady Alice Neville, the daughter of Ralph Neville, 1st Earl of Westmorland and his first wife Margaret de Stafford (d. 1396). Margaret de Stafford was the daughter of Hugh de Stafford, 2nd Earl of Stafford.

In 1412, Grey betrothed his 8-year-old son and heir, Thomas Grey, to Isabel, the 3-year-old daughter of Richard of Conisburgh, 3rd Earl of Cambridge. The marriage took place on 18 February 1413. As part of the marriage settlement, Grey acquired the lordship of Wark-in-Tyndale at a 'bargain price', which was nonetheless more than he could afford, leading Pugh to conclude that Grey was Cambridge's 'dupe', 'whose intrigues brought them both to disaster'.

Grey, Cambridge, and Henry Scrope, 3rd Baron Scrope of Masham, were the ringleaders of the failed Southampton Plot of 1415, which was a plot to assassinate King Henry V at Southampton before he sailed to France and to replace him with Edmund Mortimer, 5th Earl of March. On 31 July 1415, Mortimer revealed the plot to the King at Portchester Castle, near Portsmouth. The conspirators were promptly arrested and executed. Sir Thomas Grey was beheaded at the North Gate of Southampton on 2 August 1415. Grey's part in the Southampton Plot was attributed by Grey himself to 'poverty and covetousness'.

The Southampton Plot is dramatized in Shakespeare's Henry V, and in the anonymous play, The History of Sir John Oldcastle.

== Issue ==
Sir Thomas Grey and Lady Alice Neville had four sons and four or five daughters:

- Sir Thomas Grey (1404 – d. before 1426), who in 1412, at eight years of age, was betrothed to Isabel of Cambridge, Countess of Essex, then three years of age, only daughter of Richard of Conisburgh, '3rd Earl of Cambridge', son of Edmund of Langley, fourth son of Edward III Plantagenet, and Philippa of Hainault and Anne Mortimer; they had one son, his heir Thomas Grey; Isabel married secondly, on 25 April 1426, by validated papal dispensation Henry Bourchier.
- Sir Ralph Grey (d. 17 March 1442), who married Elizabeth, daughter of Henry FitzHugh, 3rd Baron FitzHugh, and Elizabeth Grey, and left children.
- Sir John Grey.
- William Grey (d. 1478), Chancellor of Oxford University, Bishop of Ely, and Lord High Treasurer.
- Eleanor who married Sir John Arundel.
- Joan Grey, who married Sir John Salvin.
- Elizabeth Grey, who married firstly, Sir William Whitchester, and secondly, Sir Roger Widdrington.
- Margaret Grey, who married Gerard Widdrington.

After Grey's execution, his widow, Alice, married Sir Gilbert Lancaster, by whom she had one son, Sir Gilbert Lancaster. Alice was still living on 22 August 1453.
