= Richard of Conisburgh, 3rd Earl of Cambridge =

English noble (1385–1415)

Richard of Conisbrough
- Earl of Cambridge
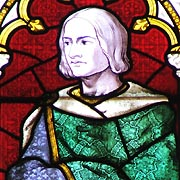
- Predecessor: Edward, 2nd Duke of York
- Born: 20 July 1385; Conisbrough Castle, Yorkshire, England
- Died: 5 August 1415 (aged 30); Southampton, Hampshire, England
- Spouses: Anne Mortimer (m. 1408; died 1411) Maud Clifford (m. 1411)
- Issue more...: Isabel, Countess of Essex; Richard, 3rd Duke of York
- House: York
- Father: Edmund of Langley, 1st Duke of York
- Mother: Isabella of Castile

Richard of Conisbrough, 3rd Earl of Cambridge (20 July 1385 – 5 August 1415) was the second son of Edmund of Langley, 1st Duke of York, and Isabella of Castile, Duchess of York. He was beheaded for his part in the Southampton Plot, a conspiracy against King Henry V. He was the father of Richard Plantagenet, 3rd Duke of York, and the grandfather of King Edward IV and King Richard III.

== Early life ==
Richard of York was born about 20 July 1385 at Conisbrough Castle, Yorkshire, the second son of Edmund of Langley, 1st Duke of York, and his first wife, Isabella of Castile. On his father's side, he was the grandson of King Edward III and Philippa of Hainault, and on his mother's side, the grandson of Peter the Cruel, King of Castile and León, and his favourite mistress, María de Padilla (died 1361). There is no record of his birth or baptism, and some put his birth in about 1375. His godfather was King Richard II, a fact that argues for the later date. Richard II was at York on 20 July 1385, close enough to serve as godfather to the future Earl of Cambridge, while in 1375 the future king was only eight years old; it was unlikely he would have been a godfather at that age, and with his father still alive.

Richard was twelve years younger than his brother, Edward. Strangely, Richard received no lands from his father and was mentioned neither in his father's will nor his brother's will. This circumstance has been taken by G.L. Harriss as an indication that Richard's father and brother did not recognize him as a full blood relative, and that he may have been the child of an illicit liaison between his mother and the king's half-brother John Holland. This theory gained new life following the DNA studies of the remains of Richard III in 2014.

Although Edmund of Langley made no provision for Richard in his will of 25 November 1400, Richard's mother, Isabella, had named King Richard II as her heir before her death on 23 December 1392, requesting him to grant her younger son an annuity of 500 marks. The king complied: on 3 February 1393, he provided his godson with an annuity of £100 from the revenues in Yorkshire that Isabella had formerly received, and on 16 March 1393, he provided him with a further annuity of 350 marks (£233 6s 8d) from the Exchequer. According to T. B. Pugh, further largess from the king might have been expected when Richard came of age; however, Richard II was deposed in 1399. According to G. L. Harriss, Richard of York "received no favours from the new King, Henry IV". After Henry IV's accession, Richard's annuities, his sole source of income, were either paid irregularly, or not paid at all.

From April 1403 to October 1404, Richard commanded a small force defending Herefordshire against the Welsh rebel leader Owain Glyndŵr, but otherwise performed no notable military service. However, it was during this period, according to T. B. Pugh, that Richard established the relationships with the Mortimer and Cherleton families that brought about his marriage to Anne de Mortimer. Richard's only other significant appointment during this period came in August 1406 when, together with the Bishop of Bath, Lord FitzHugh, and Lord Scrope, he was chosen to escort King Henry's daughter Philippa to Denmark for her marriage to King Eric. Richard was knighted in July of that year, perhaps in anticipation of this embassy. Pugh notes that during this three-month embassy to Denmark, Richard would have become well acquainted with Lord Scrope, who married Richard's stepmother Joan Holland in September 1411, and with whom Richard later became involved in the Southampton Plot of 1415 that cost them both their lives.

== Southampton Plot ==
In the Parliament of 1414, Richard was created Earl of Cambridge, a title formerly held by his elder brother, Edward, 2nd Duke of York, who had earlier ceased to be Earl of Cambridge either by resignation or deprivation of the title.

Richard's creation as Earl of Cambridge in 1414, however, brought with it no accompanying grant of lands, and according to Harriss, Cambridge was "the poorest of the earls" who were to set out on Henry V's invasion of France. As a result, he lacked the resources to equip himself properly for the expedition. Perhaps partly for this reason, Richard conspired with Lord Scrope and Sir Thomas Grey to depose Henry V of England and place his late wife Anne's brother Edmund Mortimer, 5th Earl of March, on the throne. On 31 July, Mortimer revealed the plot to the king. Later, he served on the commission that condemned Richard to death. Although Richard pleaded with the king for clemency, he was beheaded on 5 August 1415 and buried in the chapel of God's House at Southampton (now St. Julien's Church, Southampton). The fleet set sail for France a few days later, on 11 August 1415.

The Southampton Plot is dramatised in Shakespeare's Henry V, and in the anonymous play, The History of Sir John Oldcastle.

== Legacy ==
Although Cambridge's title was forfeited, he was not attainted, and his four-year-old son Richard was his heir. Within three months, Cambridge's elder brother, Edward of Norwich, 2nd Duke of York, was slain at Agincourt, and Cambridge's four-year-old son eventually inherited his uncle's titles and estates as well as his father's.

In the parliament of 1461, Cambridge's grandson King Edward IV had the sentence that had been passed on his grandfather annulled as "irregular and unlawful".

== Marriages and issue ==
Early in 1408 Richard married Anne de Mortimer, the eldest of the four children of Roger Mortimer, 4th Earl of March, and Eleanor Holland. Anne was a niece of Richard's stepmother Joan Holland, and the granddaughter of his first cousin, Philippa of Clarence. Thus, Richard and Anne were first cousins twice removed, yet they were close in age; Richard was only three years older than she.

The marriage took place secretly, without parental consent, and was validated on 23 May 1408 by papal dispensation. It brought Richard no financial benefit, since Anne's only income was an annuity of £50 granted for her maintenance by Henry IV in 1406.

By his first wife, Richard had two sons and a daughter:

- Isabel of York (1409 – 2 October 1484), who in 1412, at three years of age, was betrothed to Sir Thomas Grey, son and heir of Sir Thomas Grey of Heaton in Norham, Northumberland, and his wife, Alice Neville, the daughter of Ralph Neville, 1st Earl of Westmorland, by whom she had one son. Before 25 April 1426, Isabel married secondly Henry Bourchier, 1st Earl of Essex, by whom she had seven sons and one daughter. This marriage was later validated by papal dispensation.
- Henry of York.
- Richard of York, 3rd Duke of York (22 September 1411 – 30 December 1460), who married Cecily Neville, the youngest daughter of Ralph Neville, 1st Earl of Westmorland, by whom he had twelve children: Anne of York, Duchess of Exeter; Henry; King Edward IV; Edmund, Earl of Rutland; Elizabeth of York, Duchess of Suffolk; Margaret of York, Duchess of Burgundy; William; John; George, Duke of Clarence; Thomas; King Richard III; and Ursula.

Anne de Mortimer died on 22 September 1411 soon after the birth of her son Richard. She was buried at Kings Langley, Hertfordshire, once the site of Kings Langley Palace, perhaps in the conventual church which houses the tombs of her husband's father Edmund and his first wife Isabella of Castile.

After the death of Anne de Mortimer, Richard married Maud Clifford, the divorced wife of John Neville, 6th Baron Latimer, and daughter of Thomas de Clifford, 6th Baron de Clifford, by Elizabeth, daughter of Thomas de Ros, 4th Baron de Ros, of Helmsley.

After Richard's death in 1415, his second wife, Maud Clifford, is said to have lived in "great state" at Conisbrough Castle and elsewhere. She died on 26 August 1446 and was buried at Roche Abbey, Yorkshire. She left a will dated 15 August 1446 in which no mention is made of her stepchildren.

== Arms ==
Arms of Richard, Earl of Cambridge

Richard bore his father's arms (those of the kingdom, differenced by a label argent of three points, each bearing three torteaux gules), differenced by a bordure Leon.

== Notes ==
=== Works cited ===
- Cokayne, G., ed. (1912). The Complete Peerage. Vol. 2. Enlarged by Vicary Gibbs (2nd ed.). London: St. Catherine Press. pp. 506–510.
- Cokayne, G., ed. (1932). The Complete Peerage. Vol. 8. Enlarged by H.A. Doubleday and Lord Howard de Walden (2nd ed.). London: St. Catherine Press. pp. 445–53.
- Fox-Davies, A. (1909). A Complete Guide to Heraldry. London: T.C. & E.C. Jack.
- Harriss, G.L. (2004). "Richard, earl of Cambridge (1385–1415)". Oxford Dictionary of National Biography (online ed.). Oxford University Press. doi:10.1093/ref:odnb/23502. (Subscription, Wikipedia Library access or UK public library membership required.)
- King, T.E.; Gonzalez Fortes, G.; Balaresque, P.; Thomas, M.G.; et al. (2014). "Identification of the remains of King Richard III". Nature Communications. 5 (5631): 5631. Bibcode:2014NatCo...5.5631K. doi:10.1038/ncomms6631. PMC 4268703. PMID 25463651.
- Pugh, T.B. (1988). Henry V and the Southampton Plot of 1415. Alan Sutton. ISBN 0-86299-541-8.
- Richardson, D. (2011). Kimball G. Everingham (ed.). Magna Carta Ancestry. Vol. 1 (2nd ed.). Salt Lake City. ISBN 978-1449966379.
- Richardson, D. (2011). Kimball G. Everingham (ed.). Magna Carta Ancestry. Vol. 3 (2nd ed.). Salt Lake City. ISBN 978-1449966393.
- Richardson, D. (2011). Kimball G. Everingham (ed.). Magna Carta Ancestry. Vol. 4 (2nd ed.). Salt Lake City. ISBN 978-1460992708.
- Surtees Society (1855). Testamenta Eboracensia, part II. Publications of the Surtees Society. Vol. 30. London. pp. 118–24. OCLC 31460618.
- Tuck, A. (2004). "Edmund, first duke of York (1341–1402)". Oxford Dictionary of National Biography (online ed.). Oxford University Press. doi:10.1093/ref:odnb/16023. (Subscription, Wikipedia Library access or UK public library membership required.)

Peerage of England
| Preceded by Edward of Norwich | Earl of Cambridge; 1414–1415 | Attainted |
