= Anne Mortimer, Countess of Cambridge =

English noblewoman (1388–1411)

Anne de Mortimer
- Born: 27 December 1388
- Died: c. 22 September 1411 (aged 22)
- Burial: All Saints' Church, Kings Langley, Hertfordshire
- Spouse: Richard of Conisburgh (m. 1408)
- Issue Detail: Isabel of York, Countess of Essex; Henry of York; Richard of York, 3rd Duke of York
- House: Mortimer
- Father: Roger Mortimer, 4th Earl of March
- Mother: Alianore Holland

Anne de Mortimer (27 December 1388 – c. 22 September 1411) was a medieval English noblewoman who became an ancestor to the royal House of York, one of the parties in the fifteenth-century dynastic Wars of the Roses. It was her line of descent from Edward III which gave the Yorkist dynasty its primary claim to the throne. Anne was the mother of Richard, Duke of York, and thus grandmother of kings Edward IV and Richard III, and great-grandmother of Edward V and Elizabeth of York.

== Early life ==
Born 27 December 1388, Anne de Mortimer was the eldest of the four children of Roger Mortimer, 4th Earl of March (1374–1398), and Eleanor Holland (1370–1405). She had two brothers, Edmund, 5th Earl of March (1391–1425), and Roger (1393–1413?), as well as a sister, Eleanor.

Her father was a grandson of Lionel, Duke of Clarence, second surviving son of King Edward III of England, an ancestry which made Mortimer a potential heir to the throne during the reign of the childless King Richard II. Upon Roger Mortimer's death in 1398, this claim passed to his son and heir, Anne's brother Edmund, Earl of March. In 1399, Richard II was deposed by Henry IV, of the House of Lancaster, making Edmund Mortimer a dynastic threat to the new king, who in turn placed both Edmund and his brother Roger under royal custody.

Anne and her sister Eleanor remained in the care of their mother, Countess Eleanor, who, not long after her first husband's death, married Lord Edward Charleton of Powys. Following their mother's death in 1405, the sisters fared less well than their brothers and were described as "destitute", needing £100 per annum for themselves and their servants.

== Marriage and issue ==
Coat of arms of Anne de Mortimer

Around early 1408 (probably after 8 January), Anne married Richard of Conisburgh (1385–1415), the second son of Edmund, Duke of York (fourth son of King Edward III). The marriage was undertaken secretly and probably with haste, without the knowledge of her nearest relatives, and was validated on 23 May 1408 by papal dispensation.

Anne de Mortimer and Richard of Conisburgh had two sons and a daughter:

- Isabel of York (1409 – 2 October 1484), who in 1412, at three years of age, was betrothed to Sir Thomas Grey, son and heir of Sir Thomas Grey of Heaton (1384–1415), by whom she had one son. Isabel married, secondly, before 25 April 1426 (the marriage being later validated by papal dispensation), Henry Bourchier, 1st Earl of Essex, by whom she had issue.
- Henry of York
- Richard of York, 3rd Duke of York (22 September 1411 – 30 December 1460), Yorkist claimant to the English throne, and father of kings Edward IV and Richard III, grandfather of Edward V.

== Death ==
Anne de Mortimer died soon after the birth of her son Richard, on 22 September 1411. She was buried at Kings Langley, Hertfordshire, once the site of Kings Langley Palace, which housed the tombs of her husband's parents Edmund of Langley and Isabella of Castile.

== Ancestry ==
Ancestors of Anne Mortimer, Countess of Cambridge

8. Roger Mortimer, 2nd Earl of March
4. Edmund Mortimer, 3rd Earl of March
9. Philippa Montagu
2. Roger Mortimer, 4th Earl of March
10. Lionel of Antwerp, Duke of Clarence
5. Philippa, 5th Countess of Ulster
11. Elizabeth de Burgh, 4th Countess of Ulster
1. Anne de Mortimer
12. Thomas Holland, 1st Earl of Kent
6. Thomas Holland, 2nd Earl of Kent
13. Joan, 4th Countess of Kent
3. Eleanor Holland
14. Richard FitzAlan, 3rd Earl of Arundel
7. Alice FitzAlan
15. Eleanor of Lancaster
