= Edmund of Langley, 1st Duke of York =

English prince and nobleman (1341–1402)

Edmund of Langley
- Duke of York
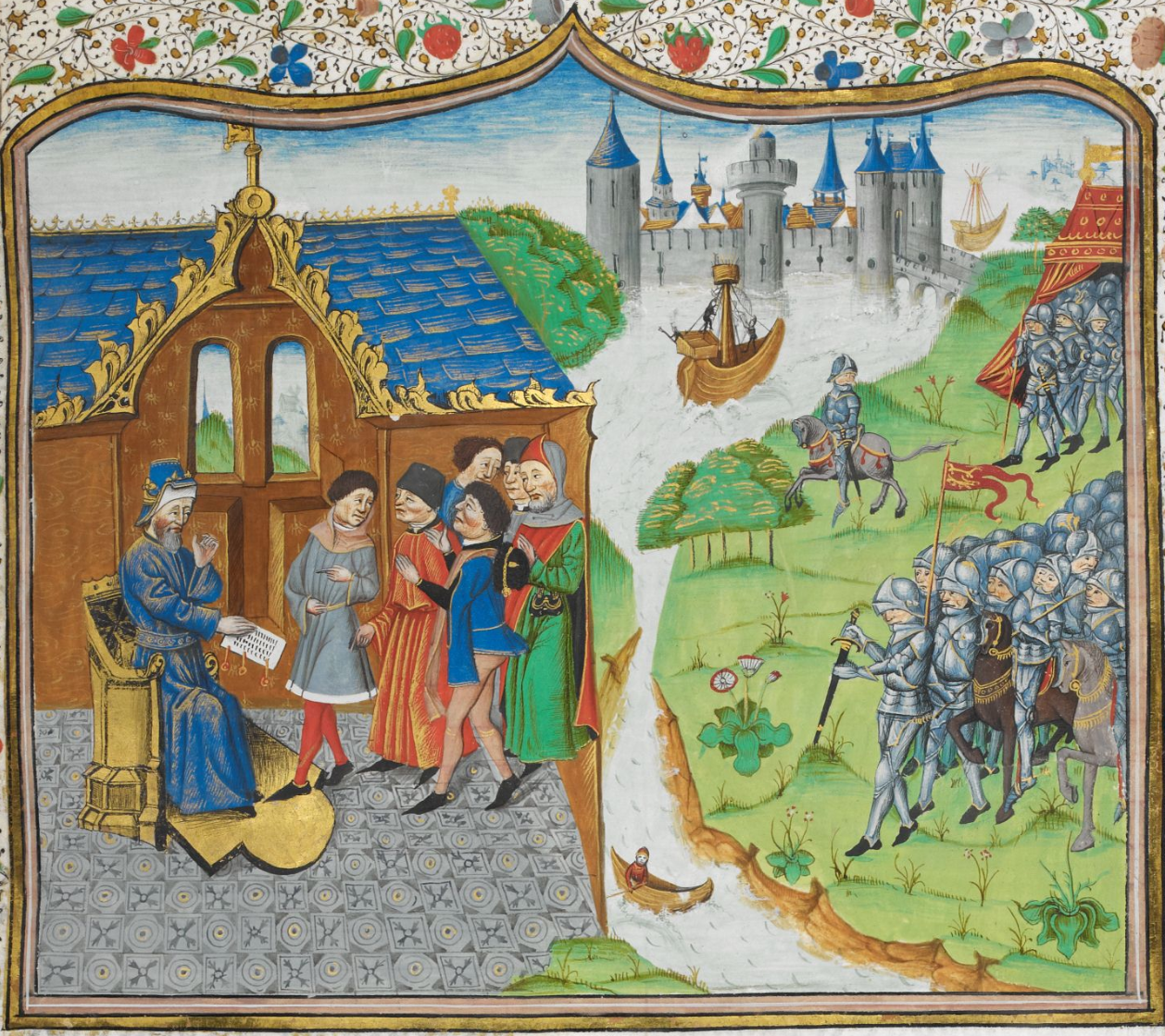
- Edmund of Langley before King Ferdinand I of Portugal, from Jean de Wavrin's Chronique d'Angleterre
- Born: 5 June 1341; Kings Langley, Hertfordshire, England
- Died: 1 August 1402 (aged 61); Epworth, Lincolnshire, England
- Burial: Kings Langley Priory (1402–1575); All Saints' Church, Kings Langley (since 1575)
- Spouse: Isabella of Castile (m. 1372; died 1392) Joan Holland (m. 1393)
- Issue: Edward, 2nd Duke of York; Constance, Countess of Gloucester; Richard, 3rd Earl of Cambridge
- House: Plantagenet (by birth); York (founder)
- Father: Edward III, King of England
- Mother: Philippa of Hainault

Edmund of Langley, 1st Duke of York (5 June 1341 – 1 August 1402) was the fifth son (fourth surviving) of King Edward III of England and Philippa of Hainault. Like many medieval English princes, he gained his nickname from his birthplace, Kings Langley Palace in Hertfordshire. He was the founder of the House of York. Through the marriage of his younger son, Richard of Conisburgh, 3rd Earl of Cambridge, to Anne de Mortimer, great-granddaughter of Edmund's elder brother Lionel of Antwerp, Duke of Clarence, the House of York made its claim to the English throne in the Wars of the Roses. The other party in the Wars of the Roses, the incumbent House of Lancaster, was formed from descendants of Edmund's elder brother John of Gaunt, 1st Duke of Lancaster, Edward III's third son.

== Early years ==
On the death of his godfather, the Earl of Surrey, Edmund was granted the earl's lands north of the Trent, primarily in Yorkshire. In 1359, he joined his father King Edward III on an unsuccessful military expedition to France and was made a knight of the Garter in 1361. In 1362, at the age of twenty-one, he was created Earl of Cambridge by his father.

Langley was only a year younger than his far more powerful brother John of Gaunt, but it has been suggested that this prince was of "limited ability", and he took less part in government than Gaunt did.

== Military career ==
Edmund took part in several military expeditions to France in the 1370s. In 1369, he brought a retinue of 400 men-at-arms and 400 archers to serve with John Hastings, 2nd Earl of Pembroke, on campaigns in Brittany and Angoulême. The following year, he first joined Pembroke again on an expedition to relieve the fortress of Belle Perche and then accompanied his eldest brother Edward, the Black Prince, on a campaign that resulted in the siege and sack of Limoges. In 1375, he sailed with the Earl of March to relieve Brest, but after some initial success, a truce was declared.

In the 1370s, English envoys entered into an alliance with Ferdinand I of Portugal, where Portugal promised to attack Castile with the Lancastrian army. As a consequence of the Caroline War in France, John of Gaunt was forced to postpone the invasion of Castile. In 1381, Edmund finally led an abortive expedition to press John's claim to Castile, joining with King Ferdinand in attacking Castile as part of the Fernandine Wars. After months of indecisiveness, a peace was again declared between Castile and Portugal, and Edmund had to lead his malcontented troops home.

Edmund was appointed Constable of Dover Castle and Warden of the Cinque Ports on 12 June 1376 and held office until 1381. On 6 August 1385, he was elevated to Duke of York. Edmund acted as Keeper of the Realm in 1394/95 when his nephew, King Richard II of England, campaigned in Ireland and presided over Parliament in 1395. He was also keeper of the realm in 1396 during the king's brief visit to France to collect his child-bride Isabella of Valois. The duke was left as Custodian of the Realm in the summer of 1399 when Richard II departed for another extended campaign in Ireland. In late June of that year, the exiled Henry Bolingbroke landed at Bridlington in Yorkshire. Edmund raised an army to resist Bolingbroke, then decided instead to join him, for which he was well rewarded. He thereafter remained loyal to the new Lancastrian regime as Bolingbroke overthrew Richard II to become King Henry IV.

== Later life ==
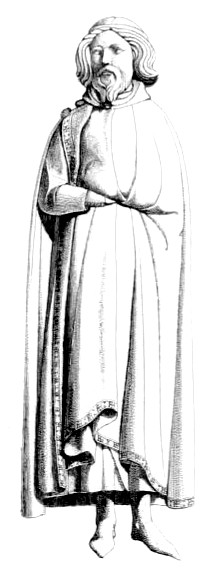
Tomb effigy

Richard II's 1399 will refers to his successor without naming him, while appointing Edmund as one of the overseers. Richard may have intended to make Edmund his heir despite the stronger claims of Henry of Bolingbroke and Edmund Mortimer. This was not due to any preference Richard had for Edmund, but rather a desire the king had to set Edmund's son, Edward, on the throne. Towards the end of his life, in 1399, he was appointed Warden of the West March for a short period. Otherwise, from 1399 onward he retired from public life.

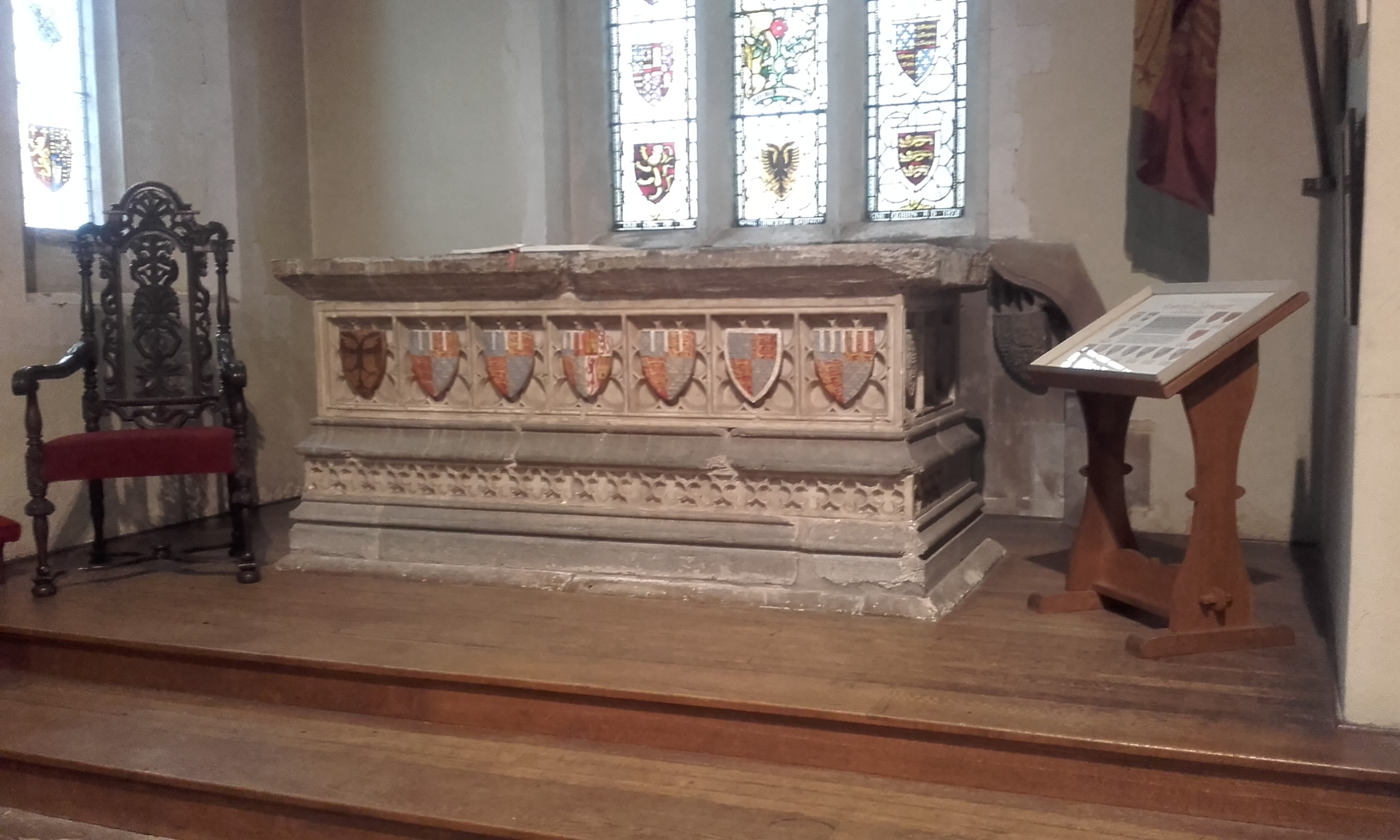
The tomb of Edmund of Langley in All Saints' Church, Kings Langley. The tomb was brought to the church in 1575 after the nearby Kings Langley Priory had been dissolved.

Although it was thought, at least from the seventeenth century, that Edmund of Langley died in his birthplace, he died at Epworth, Lincolnshire. He was interred at Kings Langley Priory; however, his tomb was relocated to the nearby All Saints' Church, Kings Langley in 1575 after the priory had been dissolved. When the tomb was moved again during church restoration work in 1877, three bodies, one male and two female, were found inside. His dukedom passed to his eldest son, Edward. He was the last of his siblings to die, and lived the longest out of all of them.

== Marriage ==
Langley's first wife, Isabella, was a daughter of King Peter of Castile and María de Padilla. She was also the younger sister of the Infanta Constance of Castile, the second wife of Langley's brother John of Gaunt. Langley and Isabella were both descendants of Henry II of England.

They had two sons and a daughter:

- Edward of Norwich, 2nd Duke of York (c. 1373 – 25 October 1415), killed in action at the Battle of Agincourt.
- Constance of York, Countess of Gloucester (c. 1375 – 28 November 1416), great-grandmother of Queen Anne Neville.
- Richard of Conisburgh, 3rd Earl of Cambridge (c. 20 July 1385 – 5 August 1415), was executed for treason by Henry V. Ancestor of kings Edward IV, Edward V and Richard III of the House of York, and all succeeding monarchs of England beginning with King Henry VIII, whose mother Elizabeth of York was Richard's great-granddaughter.

After Isabella's death in 1392, Langley married his second cousin once removed, Joan Holland, whose great-grandfather Edmund of Woodstock, 1st Earl of Kent, was the half-brother of Langley's grandfather Edward II; she and Langley were thus both descended from King Edward I. The young Joan was the granddaughter of his late sister-in-law Joan of Kent. The marriage produced no children.

== Shakespeare's Duke of York ==
As a son of the sovereign, Edmund bore the arms of the sovereign, differenced by a label argent, on each point three torteaux.

Edmund, the 1st Duke of York, is a major character in Shakespeare's Richard II. In the play, Edmund resigns his position as an adviser to his nephew Richard II, but is reluctant to betray the king. He eventually agrees to side with Henry Bolingbroke to help him regain the lands Richard confiscated after the death of Bolingbroke's father, John of Gaunt. After Bolingbroke deposes Richard and is crowned Henry IV, Edmund discovers a plot by his son Aumerle (Edward of Norwich) to assassinate the new king. Edmund exposes the plot, but his wife Isabella convinces Henry to pardon her son. In reality, Edmund's wife Isabella (of Castile) had died in 1392, eight years before the plot against Bolingbroke (Henry IV).

== Bibliography ==
- James Reston, Jr. "Dogs of God," New York: Doubleday, p. 18.
- Douglas Biggs, "A Wrong Whom Conscience and Kindred Bid Me to Right: A Reassessment of Edmund of Langley, Duke of York and the Usurpation of Henry IV" Albion, 26 (1994), pp. 231–246.
- Douglas Biggs, "To Aid the Custodian and Council: Edmund of Langley and the Defense of the Realm, June–July 1399," Journal of Medieval Military History, I (2002), pp. 125–144.
- Douglas Biggs, "A Voyage or Rather and Expedition to Portugal: Edmund of Langley in Iberia 1381/82," Journal of Medieval Military History 7 (2009), pp. 57–74.
- Douglas Biggs, Three Armies in Britain: The Irish Campaign of Richard II and the Usurpation of Henry IV, 1399, Brill Academic Publishers, Leiden, The Netherlands, 2006.

Edmund of Langley House of Plantagenet Born: 5 June 1341 Died: 1 August 1402
Political offices
Preceded by Sir Thomas Reines	Lord Warden of the Cinque Ports; 1376–1381	Succeeded by Sir Robert Assheton
Preceded by The Lord Beaumont	Lord Warden of the Cinque Ports; 1396–1398	Succeeded by The Marquess of Dorset
Legal offices
Preceded by Sir John Holland	Justice of Chester; 1385–1387	Succeeded by The Duke of Ireland
Peerage of England
New creation	Duke of York; 1st creation 1385–1402	Succeeded by Edward of Norwich
New creation	Earl of Cambridge; 2nd creation 1362–1402	Succeeded by Edward of Norwich
