= Edward the Black Prince =

Heir apparent of Edward III of England (1330–1376)

- Prince of Wales and Aquitaine; Duke of Cornwall; Earl of Chester
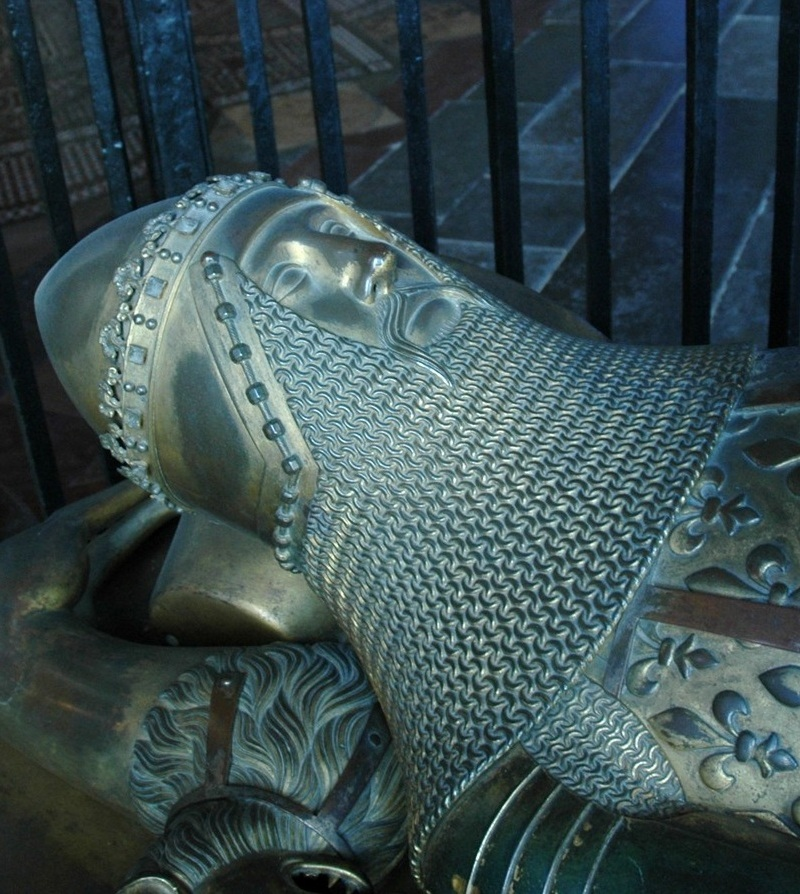
- Effigy of Prince Edward in Canterbury Cathedral
- Born: 15 June 1330; Woodstock Palace, Oxfordshire, England
- Died: 8 June 1376 (aged 45); Westminster Palace, London, England
- Burial: 29 September 1376; Canterbury Cathedral, Kent
- Spouse: Joan of Kent (m. 1361; ann. 1361) (m. 1361)
- Issue more...: Edward of Angoulême; Richard II of England; Roger Clarendon (ill.)
- House: Plantagenet
- Father: Edward III of England
- Mother: Philippa of Hainault

Edward of Woodstock (15 June 1330 – 8 June 1376), known as the Black Prince, (Note: Edward of Woodstock after the place of his birth, (Hunt 1889, p. 90 ( This article incorporates text from a publication now in the public domain: Hunt, William (1889), "Edward the Black Prince", in Stephen, Leslie (ed.), Dictionary of National Biography, vol. 17, London: Smith, Elder & Co, pp. 90–101) Endnotes cites le Baker Chronicle) was Duke of Cornwall (from 1337), the Prince of Wales (from 1343) and the Prince of Aquitaine (1362–1372). Sometimes called Edward IV (Hunt 1889, p. 90 cites Walsingham Eulogium). For details of the origins of the sobriquet "Black Prince" see the section "Appellation 'Black Prince'".) was the eldest son and heir apparent of King Edward III of England. He died before his father, and his son Richard II therefore succeeded to the throne instead. Edward was one of the most successful English commanders of the Hundred Years' War (1337–1453). He was regarded by English contemporaries as a model of chivalry and one of the greatest knights of his era, while French sources remember him for his brutality.

Edward was made Duke of Cornwall, the first English dukedom, in 1337. He was made Prince of Wales in 1343, and knighted by his father at La Hougue in 1346. That same year, Edward commanded the vanguard at the Battle of Crécy. He took part in Edward III's 1349 Calais expedition. In 1355, he was appointed the king's lieutenant in Gascony, and ordered to lead an army into Aquitaine on a chevauchée, during which he sacked Avignonet, Castelnaudary, Carcassonne, and Narbonne. In 1356, on another chevauchée, he ravaged Auvergne, Limousin, and Berry, though he failed to take Bourges. The forces of King John II of France met Edward's army near the city of Poitiers. After negotiations between them broke down, the Battle of Poitiers began. Edward's forces routed the French army and captured John II.

In 1360, he negotiated the Treaty of Brétigny. He was made Prince of Aquitaine and Gascony in 1362, but his suzerainty was not recognised by the Lord of Albret or other Gascon nobles. He was directed by his father in 1364 to suppress raids of the English and Gascon free companies. He made an agreement with Kings Peter of Castile and Charles II of Navarre, by which Peter covenanted to mortgage Castro Urdiales and the province of Biscay to him as security for a loan; in 1366, a passage was secured through Navarre. In 1367, he defeated Henry of Trastámara, Peter's half-brother and rival, at the Battle of Nájera. After waiting several months—during which, he failed to obtain either the province of Biscay, or liquidation of the debt from Don Pedro—he returned to Aquitaine. Edward persuaded the estates of Aquitaine to allow him a hearth tax of ten sous for five years in 1368, which alienated the Lord of Albret and other nobles.

Prince Edward returned to England in 1371 and resigned the principality of Aquitaine and Gascony in 1372. He led the Commons in their attack upon the Lancastrian administration in 1376, before dying soon after.

== Early life (1330–1343) ==
The Kingdom of France and surrounding areas in 1328

Edward, the eldest son of Edward III of England—Lord of Ireland and ruler of Gascony, and Queen Philippa—was born at Woodstock, Oxfordshire, on 15 June 1330. On 10 September, Edward III allocated five hundred marks per year from the profits of the county of Chester to financially support his son; on 25 February 1331, the whole of these profits were assigned to the queen for supporting Edward and the king's sister Eleanor. In July 1331, the king proposed to marry Edward to a daughter of Philip VI of France. Tensions between England and France reached a breaking point during the reign of Edward III. Disputes over English lands in France, feudal obligations due to king Philip IV of France, and Edward III's claim to the French throne culminated in Edward declaring war on France in 1337, beginning the Hundred Years' War.

On 18 March 1333, Prince Edward was invested with the earldom and county of Chester, and in the parliament of 9 February 1337, he was made Duke of Cornwall, and received the duchy by a charter dated 17 March. This is the earliest instance of the creation of a duke in England. By the charter's terms, the duchy was to be held by Edward and the eldest sons of kings of England. His tutor was Walter Burley of Merton College, Oxford. His revenues were placed at the disposal of his mother in March 1334, for the expenses she made in raising him and his two sisters, Isabella and Joan. Rumours of an impending French invasion led the king in August 1335 to order that he and his household leave Nottingham Castle for their safety.

The Hundred Years' War started when Edward III of England claimed the French throne then held by his relative, Philip VI of France

When two cardinals came to England at the end of 1337 to make peace between Edward III and Philip VI, Prince Edward reportedly met them, and brought them to Edward III. On 11 July 1338, his father, who was about to leave England to campaign in the Low Countries, appointed him guardian of the kingdom for his absence, and he was appointed to the same office on 27 May 1340 and 6 October 1342; due to his age, he had only a small role in the administration, which was managed by the council. To bring John III, Duke of Brabant into his cause, in 1339, the king proposed a marriage between Edward and John's daughter Margaret, and in the spring of 1345, wrote urgently to Pope Clement VI for an exemption from the marriage.

On 12 May 1343, Edward III made Edward the Prince of Wales in a parliament held at Westminster. Edward accompanied his father to Sluys on 3 July 1345, and the king tried to persuade the burgomasters of Ghent, Bruges, and Ypres to accept his son as their lord, but the murder of Jacob van Artevelde made his effort futile. In September 1345 and in April 1346, Edward was called on to give supplies to troops from his principality and earldom for the upcoming campaign in France, and as he incurred heavy debts in the king's service, his father allowed him to make his will. It was determined that, in case he died in the war, his executors would receive his revenue for a year.

== Early campaigns (1346–1353) ==
=== Battle of Crécy ===
Edward, Prince of Wales, sailed with his army and Edward III on 11 July 1346, and as soon as they landed at La Hougue, his father knighted him at a church in Quettehou. He then rode his army through the Cotentin, while burning and sacking the area. Edward distinguished himself at the Battles of Caen and Blanchetaque, against Godemar I du Fay's army which tried to prevent the English from crossing the Somme.

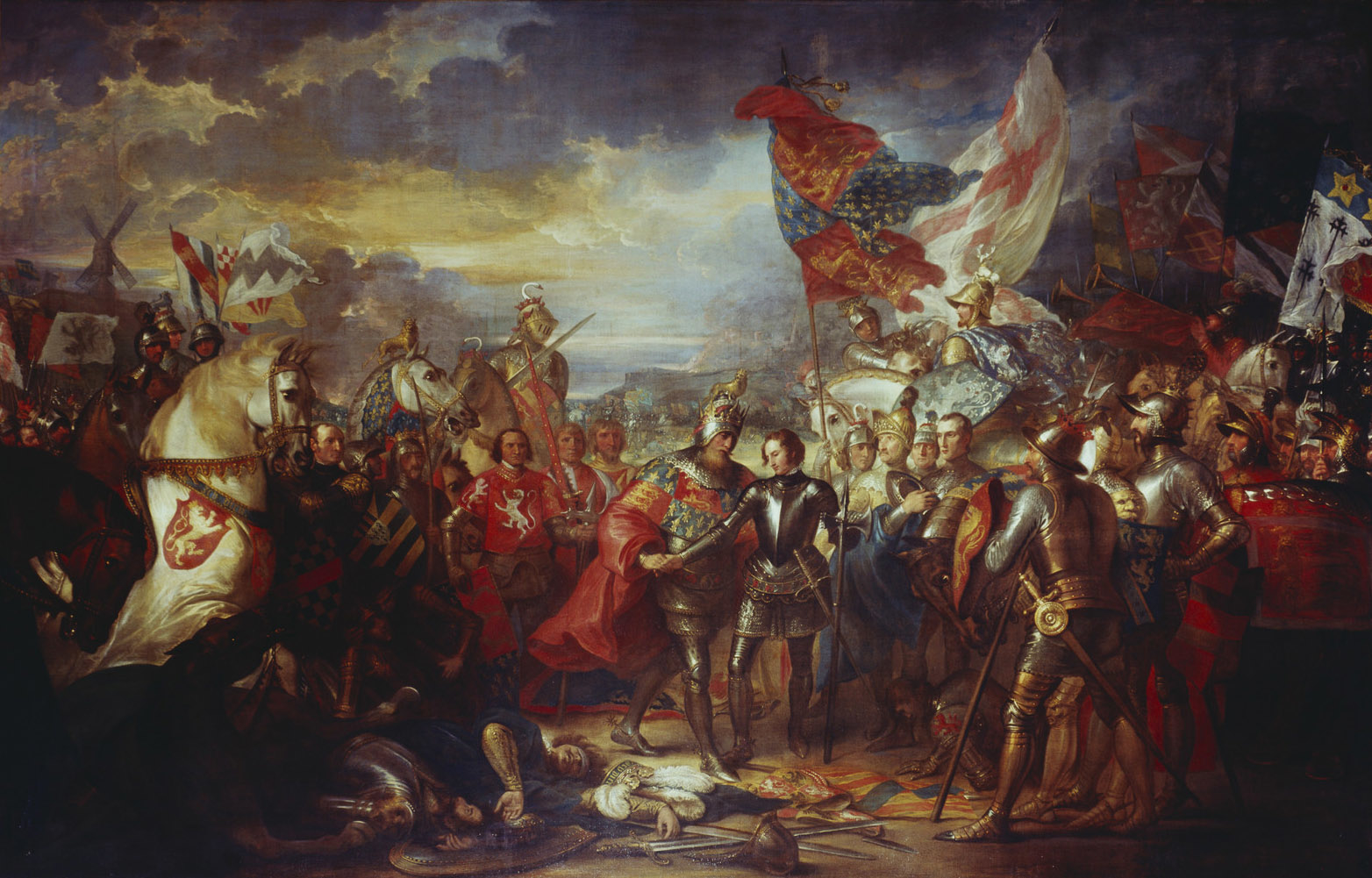
Edward III with the Black Prince after the Battle of Crécy (1788) by Benjamin West

Early on 26 August 1346, before the start of the Battle of Crécy, Edward received the sacrament with his father at Crécy, and took the command of the right, or van, of the army with Thomas Beauchamp, 11th Earl of Warwick; John de Vere, 7th Earl of Oxford, and other leaders. An unconfirmed source says that they commanded 800 men-at-arms, 2,000 archers, and 1,000 Welsh foot soldiers. When the Genoese bowmen and the front line of the French became disordered, Edward apparently left his position to attack their second line. However, the Count of Alençon then charged his division, endangering Edward, and the leaders who commanded with him sent a messenger to beg Edward III for assistance. When Edward III learned that his son was not wounded, he responded that he would not send help, to give Edward an opportunity to "win his spurs", despite already being knighted. In the battle, Edward was thrown to the ground, then rescued by Sir Richard Fitz-Simon, his standard-bearer, who protected him as he regained his feet. Probably by this time, the French advanced to the elevated ground of the English position. Earl of Arundel, having been sent for help by Harcourt, forced back the French.

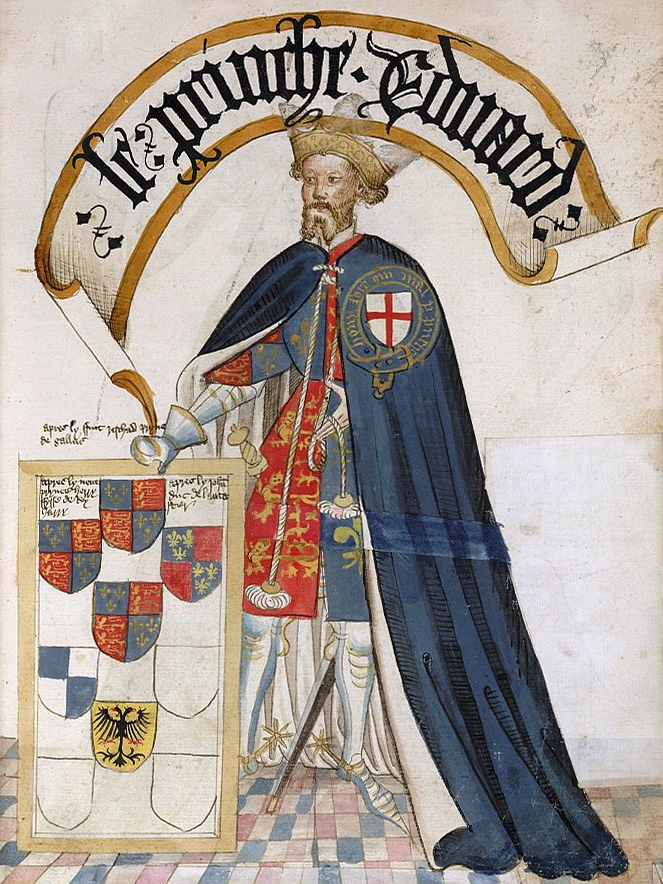
15th-century illustration of Edward as a Knight of the Garter

A flank attack on the side of Wadicourt was then attempted by the Counts of Alençon and Ponthieu, but the English were entrenched there, and the French were unable to penetrate the defences. The French lost the Duke of Lorraine and the Counts of Alençon and Blois. The two front lines of their army were broken, and Philip VI's division then engaged. Edward III perhaps advanced at the head of the reserve, and the rout was soon completed. When the battle was over, Edward III told his son that he had acted loyally.

Edward was present at the siege of Calais (1346–1347), and after the town surrendered, he sacked and burnt the surrounding countryside. He returned to England with his father on 12 October 1347, and was invested by the king with the new Order of the Garter in 1348.

=== Battles of Calais and Winchelsea ===
Prince Edward went on the king's expedition to Calais in the late 1349, once coming to the rescue of his father. When the king embarked at Winchelsea on 28 August 1350 to intercept the fleet of La Cerda, the Prince sailed with him in a different ship, alongside his brother, John of Gaunt, Earl of Richmond. During the Battle of Winchelsea, Edward's ship engaged with a large Spanish ship, and became endangered by leaks. He and his knights failed to take down the Spanish. Henry of Grosmont, Earl of Lancaster, came to their rescue by attacking the Spanish from their other side; the ship was soon taken by the English, as her crew were thrown into the sea, and as the Prince and his men got on board, their own vessel foundered.

=== Cheshire expedition ===
In 1353, some incidents seem to have broken out in Cheshire, as the Prince as Earl of Chester marched with Henry of Grosmont, now Duke of Lancaster, to the neighbourhood of Chester to protect the justices, who were holding an assize there. The men of the earldom offered to pay him a heavy fine to stop the assize, but the justices opened an inquisition of trailbaston, took a large sum of money from them. They seized houses and swaths of land for their earl, the prince. Upon returning from Chester, the prince reportedly passed by the Abbey of Dieulacres in Staffordshire, and granted five hundred marks—a tenth of the sum he had taken from his earldom—to a church his great-grandfather Edward I had built, which was almost certainly Vale Royal.

== Further campaigns (1355–1364) ==
=== Aquitaine ===
When Edward III decided to resume the war with France in 1355, he ordered Edward to lead an army into Aquitaine while he acted with the King of Navarre in Normandy, and the Duke of Lancaster defended John of Montfort in Brittany. Edward was accompanied by some of the Gascon lords. On 10 July, the king appointed Edward his lieutenant in Gascony, and gave him powers to act in his stead and to receive homages. Edward left London for Plymouth on 30 June, was stopped there by contrary winds, and set sail on 8 September with about 300 ships, along with four earls—Thomas Beauchamp; John de Vere; William Ufford, Earl of Suffolk; and William Montagu, Earl of Salisbury—and in command of 1,000 men-at-arms, 2,000 archers, and many Welsh foot soldiers.

Route of Edward's 1355 chevauchée

At Bordeaux, the Gascon lords received him with much rejoicing. It was decided to make a short campaign before the winter, and on 10 October, he set out with 1,500 lances, 2,000 archers, and 3,000 light foot. Whatever plan the king may have formed during the summer, Edward's expedition was purely for sacking the area. After brutally attacking the counties of Juliac, Armagnac, Astarac, and part of Comminges, he crossed the Garonne at Sainte-Marie, north of Toulouse—which was occupied by John I, Count of Armagnac, and a large force. The count refused to allow the garrison to make a sortie, and Edward went on into the Lauragais. His troops stormed and burnt Montgiscard, killing many residents, and captured and pillaged Avignonet and Castelnaudary. The only castle to resist the English was Montgey. Its châtelaine defended its walls by pouring beehives onto the attackers, who fled in panic.

Carcassonne was taken and sacked, but Edward did not take the citadel, which was fortified and favourably located. Ourmes (or Homps, near Narbonne) and Trèbes bought off his army. He sacked Narbonne, and then wanted to attack the citadel for loot, but decided against it after hearing it was well defended. While there a messenger came to him from the papal court, urging him to allow negotiations for peace. He replied that he could do nothing without knowing his father's will. From Narbonne, he marched back to Bordeaux. The Count of Armagnac tried to intercept him, but as a group of French soldiers had been defeated in a skirmish near Toulouse, the rest of the army retreated into the city, and Edward returned to Bordeaux with his spoils. The expedition lasted eight weeks. The next month, before 21 January 1356, the leaders under his command attacked five towns and seventeen castles.

==== Battle of Poitiers ====
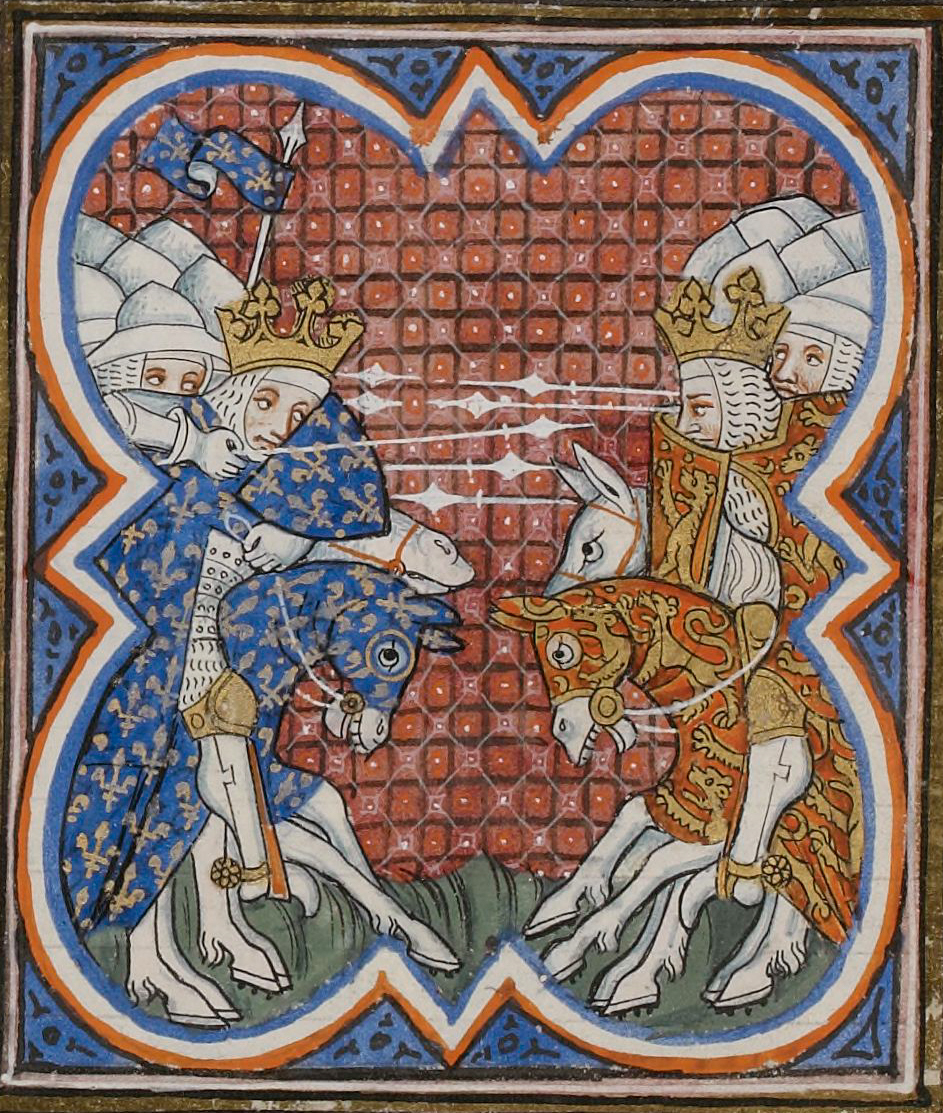
1370s illustration of the Battle of Poitiers

On 6 July 1356, Edward set out on another expedition, intending to pass through France to Normandy, and then aid his father's Norman allies, the party headed by the King of Navarre and French noble Geoffroy d'Harcourt. In Normandy, he expected his father to meet him. He crossed the Dordogne river at Bergerac on 4 August and rode through Auvergne, Limousin, and Berry, plundering and burning until he came to Bourges, where he burnt the suburbs, but failed to take the city. He then turned west, and made an unsuccessful attack on Issoudun on 25–27 August. Meanwhile, John II gathered a large force at Chartres, from which he could defend the passages of the Loire river, and sent troops to fortresses that seemed prone to an attack. From Issoudun, Edward returned to his former line of march and took Vierzon. There, he learned that he could not cross the Loire or meet up with Lancaster, who was then in Brittany. He decided to return to Bordeaux by way of Poitiers, and after executing most of the garrison of the castle of Vierzon, he set out on 29 August towards Romorantin.

Some French knights who skirmished with the English advanced guard retreated into Romorantin, and Edward asked to go to them. He visited the fortress to inspect it, and sent English knight John Chandos to summon the garrison to surrender. The place was defended by Boucicault and other leaders, and on their refusal to surrender, he assaulted it on 31 August. The siege lasted three days, and the prince, enraged at the death of a friend, declared that he would not leave the place without its capture. Finally, he set fire to the roofs of the fortress by using Greek fire, reduced it on 3 September.

Movements of the Anglo-Gascon and French armies during Edward's 1356 chevauchée

On 5 September, Edward proceeded to march through Berry. On 9 September, John II, who had gathered a large force, crossed the Loire at Blois and pursued them. When the king was at Loches on 12 September, he had as many as 20,000 men-at-arms, and with these and other forces he advanced to Chauvigny. On 16 and 17 September his army crossed the Vienne. Meanwhile, Edward was marching almost parallel to the French and at a few miles away. From 14 to 16 September he was at Châtellerault, and on the 17th, as he was marching towards Poitiers, some French men-at-arms skirmished with his advance guard, pursued them up to the main body of his army, and were all killed or taken prisoner. The French king had outstripped him, and his retreat was cut off by an army at least 50,000 strong, while Edward had about 7,500 men. Lancaster had tried to come to his aid, but was stopped by the French at Pont-de-Cé.

When Edward learned that the French army was between him and Poitiers, he took up a position on high ground southeast of the city, in the commune of Beauvoir, and stayed the night there. On 18 September, Cardinal Hélie Talleyrand tried to make peace. Edward was willing to come to terms, and offered to cede all towns and castles he had conquered, to set free all prisoners, and not to serve against the King of France for seven years, besides, reportedly, offering a payment of 100,000 francs. King John II of France, however, was persuaded to demand that Edward and a hundred of his knights surrender as prisoners. Edward did not agree. The cardinal's negotiations were protracted to help the French, as John needed time for further reinforcements to join his army. Considering the position of Edward, it seems likely that the French might have destroyed his army by surrounding it with a portion of their men, and thus either starving it, or forcing it to leave its station, and fight in the open, despite certain defeat. John made a mistake in allowing Edward respite during the negotiations, during which he employed his army in strengthening its position. The English front was covered by vines and hedges; on its left and rear was the ravine of the Miausson river and a good deal of broken ground, and its right was flanked by the wood and abbey of Nouaillé. For a day, the army dug trenches and built fences to make a kind of entrenched camp, as at Crécy.

Edward drew up his men in three divisions, the first being commanded by the Earls of Warwick and Suffolk, the second by himself, and the rear by Salisbury and Oxford. The French were drawn up in four divisions, one behind the other, and so lost much of the advantage of their superior numbers. In front of his first line, and on either side of the narrow lane that led to his position, Edward stationed his archers, who were protected by hedges, and detached a force of 300 men-at-arms and 300 mounted archers who were to fall on the flank of the second enemy division, commanded by the Dauphin, Charles, Duke of Normandy.

On 19 September, the battle began. Three hundred selected men-at-arms attempted to ride through the narrow lane and force the English position but were shot down by the archers. A body of Germans and the first division of the army which followed were thrown into disorder; then the English force in ambush charged the second division on the flank, and as it began to waver the English men-at-arms mounted their horses, and charged down the hill. Edward kept Chandos by his side, and the latter helped Edward in the battle. All the French soldiers, except the advance guard, fought on foot, and the division of the Duke of Normandy, already weakened, was forced by the English charge to flee in disorder. The next division, under Philip, Duke of Orléans, also fled, but the rear under John II did not break. The French forces were fully routed and left 11,000 dead on the field. Nearly 100 counts, barons, and bannerets, as well as 2,000 men-at-arms were made prisoners, and the king and his youngest son Philip were among those who were taken. The English losses were not large.

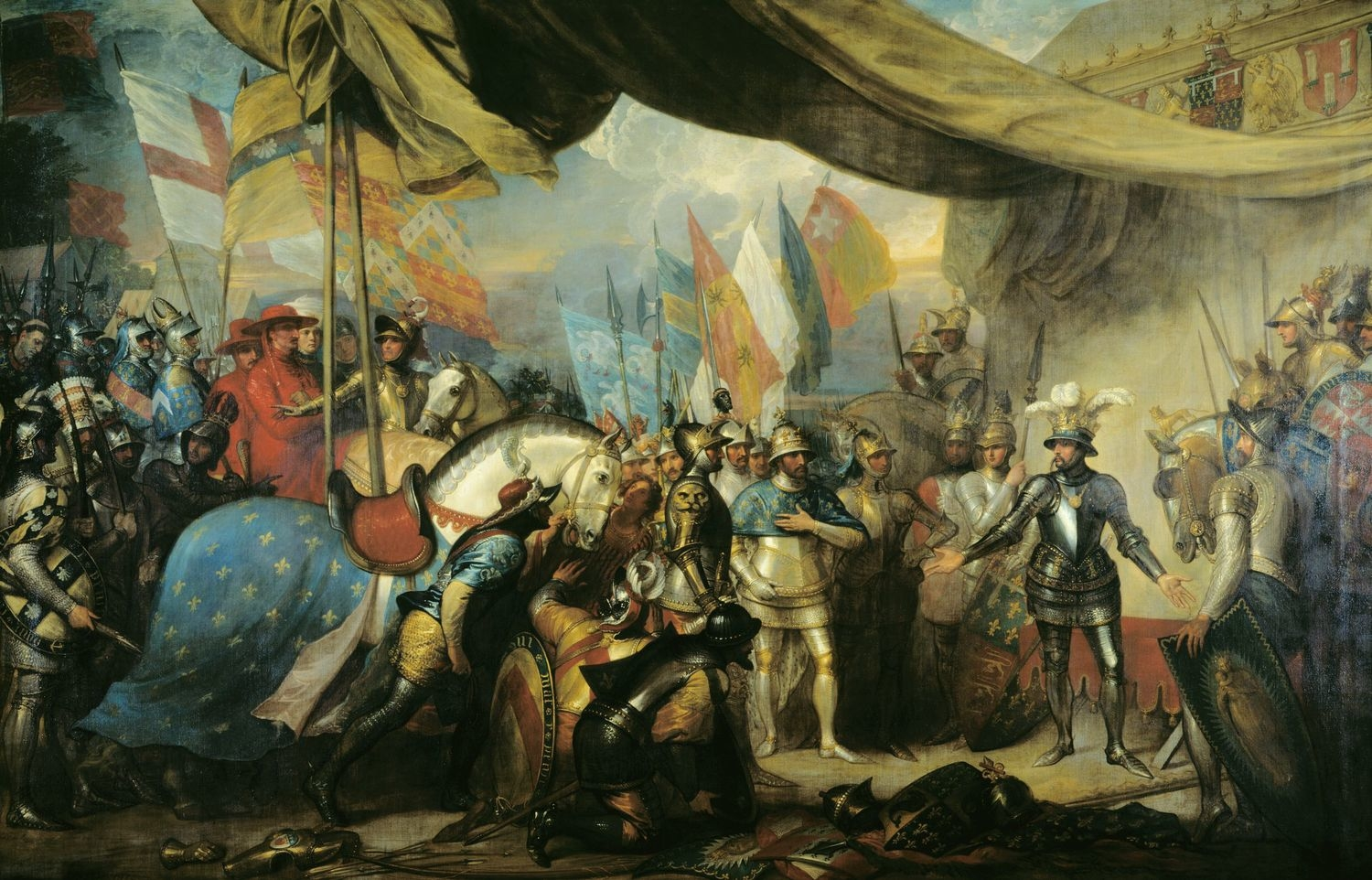
The Black Prince Receiving King John of France after the Battle of Poitiers (1788) by Benjamin West

When John II was brought to him, Edward received him with respect, and at supper, entertained him and the others who were made prisoners. The next day, Edward continued his retreat towards Bordeaux; his armies were unharmed on the way there.

At Bordeaux, which they reached on 2 October, Edward was received kindly, and he and his men stayed there for the winter. They wasted a large part of the gold and silver they had gathered in their campaign on feasts and celebrations. On 23 March 1357, Edward concluded a two years' truce, for he wished to return home. The Gascon lords were unwilling to see John II be carried off to England, and Edward gave them 100,000 crowns to silence their dissent. He left the country under the government of four Gascon lords, and arrived in England on 4 May, landing at Plymouth. He entered London in triumph on 24 May, with John as his prisoner.

==== England, tournaments and debts ====
After his return to England, Edward took part in the many festivals and tournaments of his father's court, and in May 1359, he, the king, and other challengers held the lists at a joust proclaimed at London by the mayor and sheriffs. To the citizens' delight, the king appeared as the mayor and the prince as the senior sheriff. Such festivities, and the lavish gifts he gave his friends, brought him into debt. On 27 August, when a new expedition into France was being prepared, the king granted that if he fell, his executors should have his whole estate for four years for the payment of his debts.

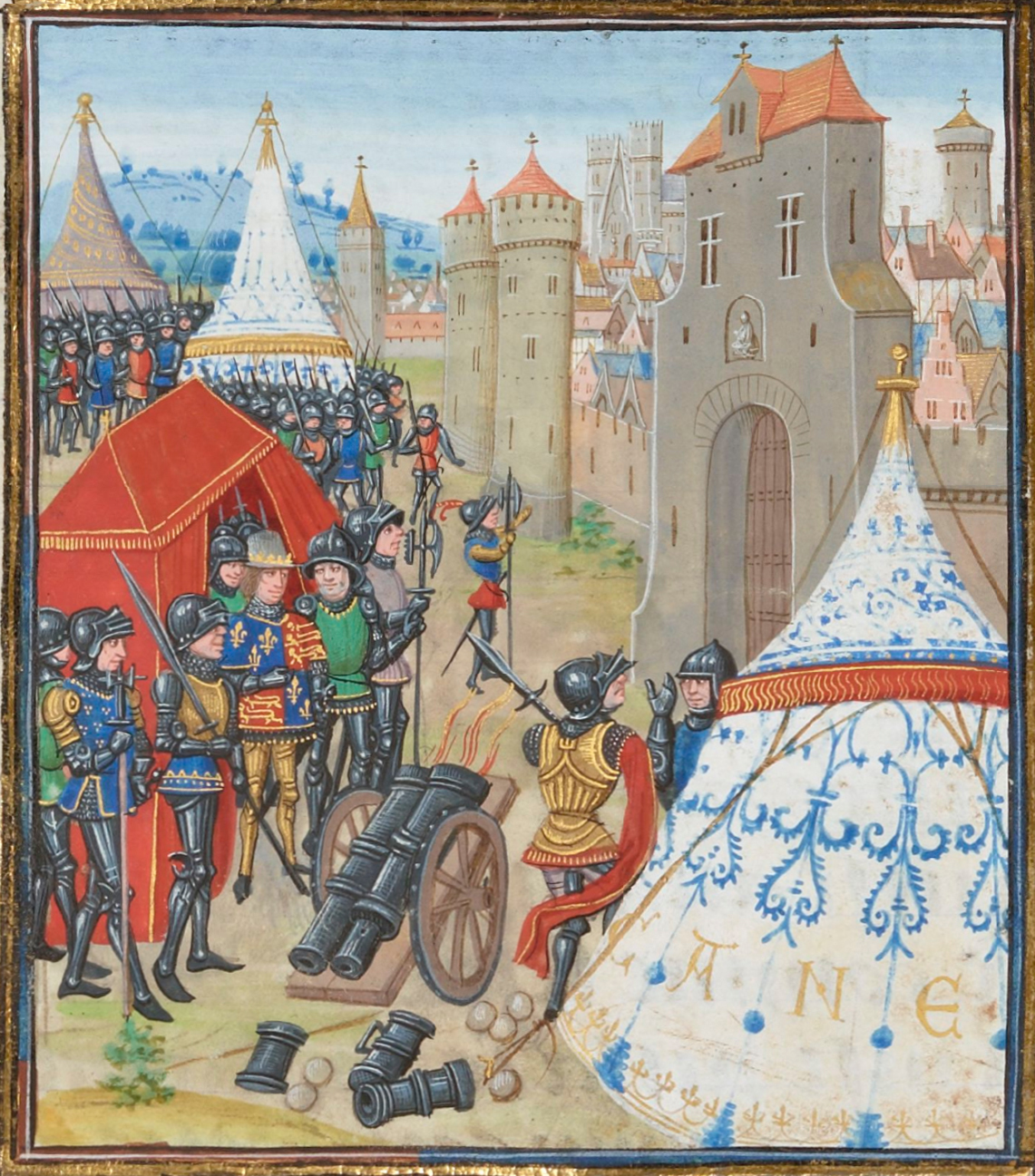
15th-century illustration of Edward III besieging Reims during the Reims campaign

=== Reims campaign ===
In October 1359, Edward sailed with his father to Calais and led a division of the army during the Reims campaign. Near the campaign's end, he took the principal part on the English side in negotiating the Treaty of Brétigny, and the preliminary truce arranged at Chartres on 7 May 1360 was drawn up by proctors acting in his name and the name of Charles, Duke of Normandy, the regent of France. He probably did not return to England until his father landed at Rye on 18 May. On 9 July, he and Henry, Duke of Lancaster, landed at Calais, visiting the French king. As the stipulated instalment of the king's ransom was not ready, he returned to England, leaving King John in the charge of Sir Walter Manny and three other knights. He and his father went to Calais on 9 October to assist with the liberation of King John and the treaty's ratification. He rode with John to Boulogne. He returned with King Edward to England at the beginning of November.

==== Marriage to Joan ====
In spring 1361, Edward married his half-first cousin once removed Joan, Countess of Kent, daughter of Edmund of Woodstock, Earl of Kent (younger son of Edward I, and Margaret, daughter of Philip III of France) and widow of Thomas Holland, 1st Earl of Kent, with whom she had five children. The wedding was performed in secret, without the knowledge of Prince Edward's parents. The marriage is believed to be a love match, as Prince of Wales acted without his father's approval, and Joan was an older widow, which did not make her ideal candidate for a future queen and mother of next royal heir; additionally, Joan was an English noblewoman, which made her an unusual choice of bride for the future king, as there had not recently been a domestic queen in England.

Because Edward and Joan were related in the third degree, and since Edward was the godfather of Joan's eldest son Thomas a dispensation was needed to make their marriage valid. It was eventually obtained from Pope Innocent VI. While the couple's wedding earlier that year was declared null, Edward and his chosen bride were allowed to have a second ceremony, that was performed by Simon Islip Archbishop of Canterbury at Windsor on 10 October 1361. Edward and Joan resided at Berkhamsted Castle in Hertfordshire and held the manor of Princes Risborough; the estate may have been used as a hunting lodge.

=== Prince of Aquitaine and Gascony ===
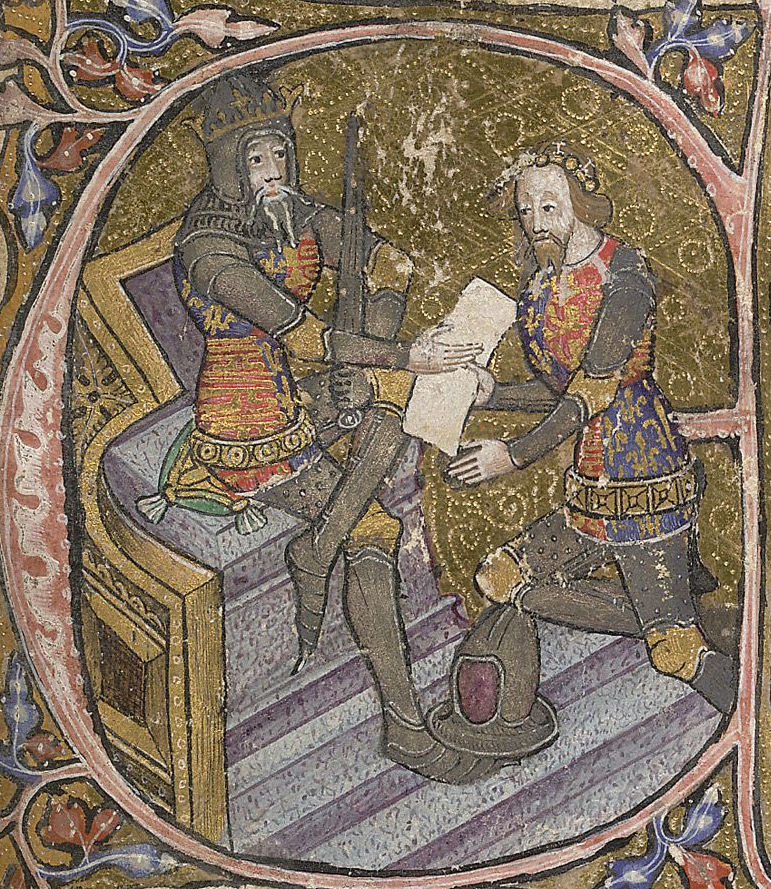
1390 illustration of Edward being granted Aquitaine by Edward III

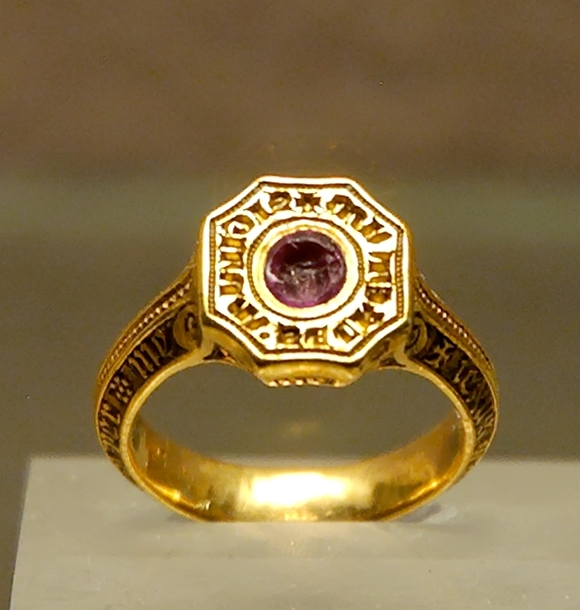
Edward's signet ring, found in Montpensier, France, in 1866, and now held in the Louvre

On 19 July 1362, Edward III granted Prince Edward all his dominions in Aquitaine and Gascony, to be held as a principality by liege homage on payment of an ounce of gold each year, together with the title of Prince of Aquitaine and Gascony. For the rest of the year he prepared for his departure to the principality, and after Christmas, he received the king and his court at Berkhamsted, left his parents, and the following February, sailed with Joan and all his household for Gascony, landing at La Rochelle.

At La Rochelle the prince was met by John Chandos, the king's lieutenant, and proceeded with him to Poitiers, where he received the homage of the lords of Poitou and Saintonge; he then rode to various cities, and finally to Bordeaux, where from 9 to 30 July, he received the homage of the lords of Gascony. He received them graciously, and resided often at Bordeaux and Angoulême.

The prince appointed Chandos constable of Guyenne, and gave the knights of his household profitable offices. Their extravagance displeased the people. Many of the Gascon lords were dissatisfied at being handed over to the dominion of the English, at the favouritism Edward displayed towards his own countrymen, and at the extravagance they displayed. Arnaud Amanieu, Lord of Albret, and others were ready to help the French cause, and Gaston III, Count of Foix, though he visited the prince on his first arrival, was loyal to the French; in 1365, he refused to do homage for Bearn. The duke of Normandy, having been crowned as the French king Charles V in April 1364, encouraged this dissatisfaction.

In April 1363 Edward mediated between the Counts of Foix and Armagnac, who had for a long time been at war with each other. He also attempted in February 1364 to mediate between Charles of Blois and John of Montfort, rivals for the Duchy of Brittany. Both appeared before him at Poitiers, but his mediation was unsuccessful.

In May 1363, Edward entertained King Peter I of Cyprus at Angoulême, and held a tournament there. Meanwhile, he and his lords declined to join Peter's proposed crusade. In the summer, the Lord of Albret was at Paris, and his forces, alongside other Gascon lords, defended the French Normandy against the party of Navarre. Meanwhile, war resumed in Brittany; the prince allowed Chandos to raise and lead a force to aid the party of Montfort. Chandos won the Battle of Auray against the French on 29 September 1364.

At this time the French countryside was continually being harried by roving bands of unemployed mercenaries, known as free companies or routiers, primarily composed of former English and Gascon soldiers. Edward was suspected of encouraging or allowing this. Because of their origins, these companies left Aquitaine untouched. On 14 November 1364, Edward III called upon him to end the pillagings.

== Spanish campaign (1365–1367) ==
In 1365, the free companies under Sir Hugh Calveley and other leaders took service with Bertrand du Guesclin who employed them in 1366 to compel King Peter of Castile to leave his kingdom and to establish his bastard brother, Henry of Trastámara, as king. In alliance with Edward III, Peter sent messengers to Prince Edward seeking help, and on receiving a gracious answer at Corunna set out for Bayonne with his son and his three daughters. The prince met him at Capbreton and rode with him to Bordeaux. Many of the prince's lords, both English and Gascon, did not want him to take up Peter's cause, but he declared that it was not "either decent or proper that a bastard should possess a kingdom as an inheritance, nor drive out of his realm his own brother, heir to the country by lawful marriage; and no king, or king's son, ought ever to suffer it, as being of the greatest prejudice to royalty."

Peter won friends by declaring that he would make Edward's son King of Galicia and would divide his riches among those who helped him. A parliament was held at Bordeaux, in which it was decided to ask the wishes of the English king. Edward III replied that it was right that his son should help Peter, and the prince held another parliament at which the king's letter was read. Then the lords agreed to give their help, provided they would be paid. To give them the required security, the prince agreed to lend Peter whatever money he needed.

Edward and Peter then held a conference with King Charles II of Navarre at Bayonne and agreed with him to allow their troops to pass through his dominions. To persuade him to do this, Peter had, besides other grants, to pay Charles 56,000 florins, and this sum was lent to him by Edward. On 23 September, the Treaty of Libourne was entered into between Edward, Peter, and Charles at Libourne, by which Peter agreed to put province of Biscay and the territory and fortress of Castro de Urdialès to Edward to guarantee the repayment of the debt. He also agreed to pay 550,000 florins for six months' wages—250,000 being the prince's—and 800,000 florins to the lords who would serve in the expedition. Peter agreed to leave his three daughters in Edward's hands as hostages to fulfill these terms. He also agreed that whenever the king, the prince, or their heirs should march in person against the Moors, they would have the command of the vanguard, and if they were not present, then England would march alongside the Castilians.

Edward received 100,000 francs from his father out of the ransom of the late John II, and used a part of this money to help to pay the soldiers he was taking into his pay. While his army was assembling he remained at Angoulême and was there visited by Peter. He then wintered at Bordeaux, where Joan gave birth to their second son Richard. Edward left in early February 1367, and stayed with his army at Dax for three days. They were reinforced by 400 men-at-arms and 400 archers sent by Edward III under John of Gaunt. From Dax, Edward advanced via Saint-Jean-Pied-de-Port through Roncesvalles (in the Pyrenees) to Pamplona (the capital of Kingdom of Navarre). When Calveley and other English and Gascon leaders of free companies found that Edward was about to fight for Peter, they withdrew from the service of Henry of Trastámara and joined Edward "because he was their natural lord". At Pamplona, Edward received a letter of defiance from Henry.

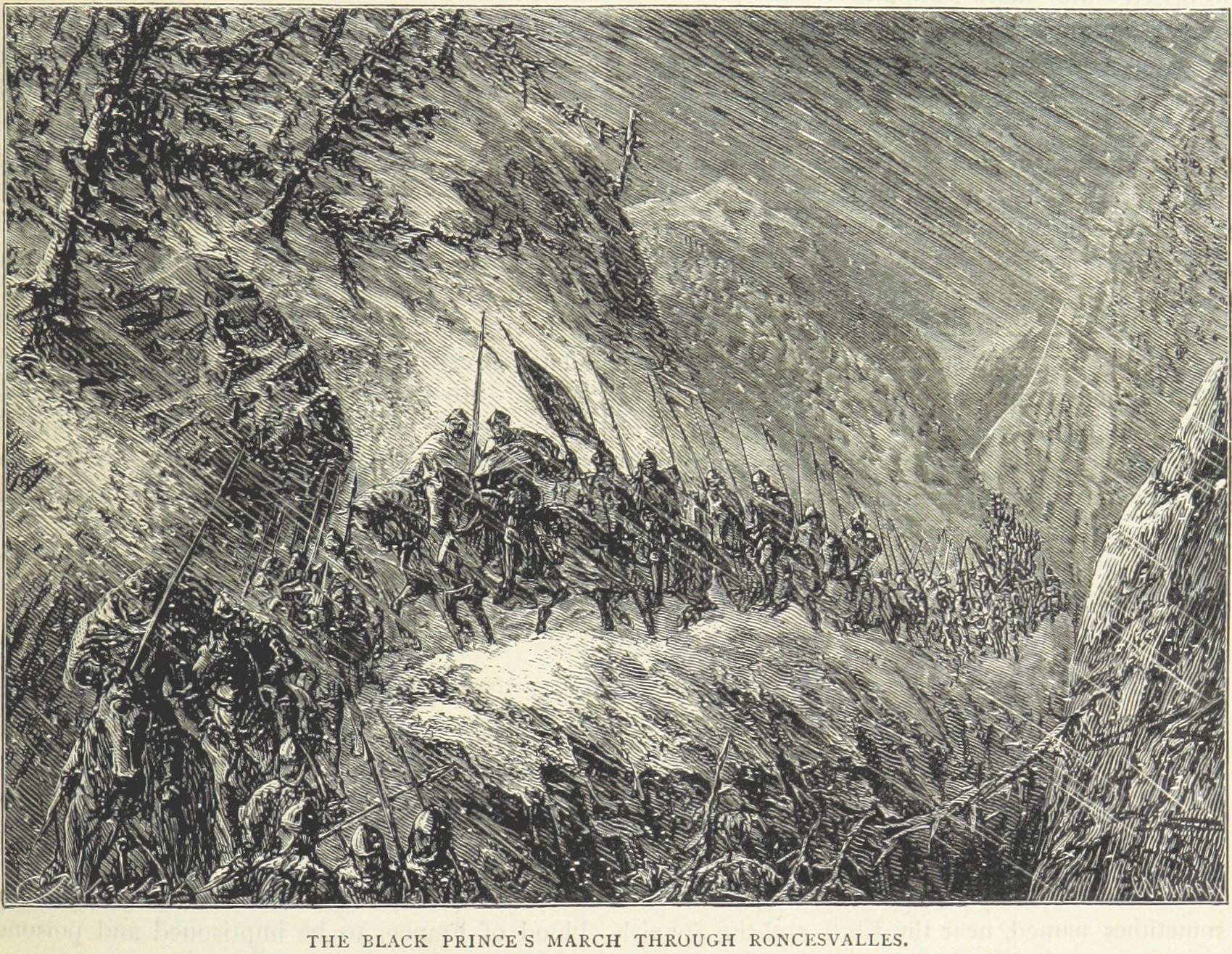
1873 illustration of Edward's march through Roncesvalles

From Pamplona, Edward marched by Arruiz to Salvatierra, which opened its gates to his army, and then advanced to Vitoria, intending to march directly to Burgos through this route. A group of his knights were set out on a reconnaissance mission under Sir William Felton, and were defeated by a skirmishing party. Edward learned that Henry was occupying some strong positions—especially Santo Domingo de la Calzada on the right of the river Ebro, and Zaldiaran mountain on the left—which made it impossible for him to reach Burgos through Álava. He thus crossed the Ebro. During the trip, the men and horses in the army suffered from a lack of provisions, and from wet and windy weather. The army encamped under the walls of Logroño, where they were better off, though still lacking in provisions.

On 30 March 1367, Edward wrote an answer to Henry's letter. On 2 April, he left Logroño and moved to Navarrete, La Rioja. Meanwhile, Henry and his French allies had encamped at Nájera, so that the two armies were now near each other. Letters passed between Henry and Edward, for Henry seems to have been anxious to reach an agreement. He declared that Peter was a tyrant and had killed innocent people, to which Edward replied that Peter had told him that all those he had killed were traitors. On 3 April, Edward's army marched from Navarrete, and the soldiers dismounted at a distance from Henry's army. The bulk of Edward's army were mercenary free companies, and probably numbered at eight to ten thousand men.

As the Battle of Nájera began, the knights of Castile attacked and pressed the English vanguard, but the wings of Henry's army failed to move, so that the Gascon lords were able to attack the main body on the flanks. Then Edward brought the main body of his army into action, and the fighting became intense. At length Henry's vanguard gave way, and he fled from the field. When the battle was over Edward asked Peter to spare the lives of those who had offended him. Peter assented, with the exception of one notorious traitor, whom he at once put to death; and he also had two others slain the next day.

Among the prisoners was the French marshal Arnoul d'Audrehem, whom Edward had formerly taken prisoner at Poitiers and whom he had released on the condition that d'Audrehem give his word that he would not bear arms against the prince until his ransom was paid. When Edward saw him, he called him a "liar and traitor". D'Audrehem denied that he was either, and Edward asked him whether he would submit to the judgment of a body of knights. To this, d'Audrehem agreed, and Edward chose twelve knights—four English, four Gascons, and four Bretons—to judge between him and the marshal. After he had stated his case, d'Audrehem replied that he had not broken his word, as Edward's army not his own, but paid for by Peter. The knights considered that this view of Edward's position was sound and gave their verdict for d'Audrehem.

On 5 April 1367, Edward and Peter marched to Burgos. Edward, however, did not take up his quarters in the city but camped outside the walls at the Monastery of Las Huelgas. Peter did not pay him any of the money he owed him, and Edward could get nothing from him except a solemn renewal of his bond of the previous 23 September, which he made on 2 May 1367 before the high altar of the Burgos Cathedral. By this time, Edward began to suspect his ally of treachery. Peter had no intention of paying his debts, and when Edward demanded possession of Biscay, Peter told him that the Biscayans would not consent to be handed over to him. To get rid of his creditor, Peter told Edward that he could not get money at Burgos, and persuaded Edward to lodge at Valladolid while he went to Seville, where he declared he would send the money he owed.

Edward remained at Valladolid amid hot weather, waiting in vain for his money. His army suffered so terribly from dysentery and other diseases, that reportedly only one out of five of them ever returned to England. Edward came down with an illness, which may have been caused by poison, and which he never recovered from. Food and drink were scarce to the army, and the free companies in his pay sacked the surrounding area.

Meanwhile, Henry made war upon Aquitaine, took Bagnères and wasted the country. Fearing that Charles of Navarre would not allow him to return through his dominions, Edward negotiated with King Peter IV of Aragon for a passage for his troops. Peter IV made a treaty with him, and when Charles of Navarre heard of it he agreed to allow Edward, the Duke of Lancaster, and some of their lords to pass through his country; so they returned through Roncesvalles and reached Bordeaux early in September 1367.

== War in Aquitaine (1366–1370) ==
Some time after he had returned to Aquitaine, the free companies, some 6,000 strong, also reached Aquitaine, having passed through Kingdom of Aragon. As they had not received all the money Edward had agreed to pay them, they took up their quarters in his country and pillaged the countryside. Edward persuaded the captains to leave Aquitaine, and the companies under their command crossed the Loire and greatly attacked France. This greatly angered Charles V, who retaliated by encouraging to the Gascon lords to disaffect.

When Edward gathered his army for his Spanish expedition, the Lord of Albret agreed to serve with 1,000 lances. Considering, however, that he had at least as many men as he could find provisions for, Edward wrote to him on 8 December 1366, saying he could only have 200 lances. The Lord of Albret was angered at this, but was restrained by his uncle, the Count of Armagnac. The nonetheless incident began his and Edward's mutual hatred. The Lord of Albert was also angered by the non-payment of an annual pension Edward had granted him. Around this time, he agreed to marry Margaret of Bourbon, sister of the Queen of France. Edward was annoyed at this, and became aggressive to both Margaret and Albret. However, Charles offered the lord the pension which he had lost, and thus drew him and his uncle, the Count of Armagnac, altogether over to the French side.

The immense cost of the late campaign and his constant extravagance had brought Edward into financial difficulties, and as soon as he returned to Bordeaux he called an assembly of the estates of Aquitaine (Parliament) to meet at Saint-Émilion to obtain a grant from them. It seems as though no business was done then, for he held a meeting of the estates at Angoulême and there persuaded them to allow him a hearth tax of ten sous for five years. An edict for this tax was published on 25 January 1368. The chancellor, Bishop John Harewell, held a conference at Niort, at which he persuaded the barons of Poitou, Saintonge, Limousin, and Rouergue to agree to this tax, but the great vassals of the high marches refused, and on 20 June and again on 25 October, the Counts of Armagnac, Périgord, and Comminges, and the Lord of Albret laid their complaints before the King of France, declaring that he was their lord paramount. Meanwhile, Chandos, who strongly urged Edward against imposing this tax, had retired to his Norman estate.

Charles took advantage of these appeals, and on 25 January 1369 sent messengers to Prince Edward, who was then residing at Bordeaux, summoning him to appear in person before him in Paris and there receive judgment. He replied: "We will willingly attend at Paris on the day appointed since the King of France sends for us, but it shall be with our helmet on our head and sixty thousand men in our company". Edward had the messengers imprisoned; in revenge for this, the Counts of Périgord and Comminges and other lords set on Thomas Wake, 2nd Baron Wake of Liddell, (Note: "Whiteval. Q. if not Whitwell. Barnes calls him sir Thomas Wake".) the high-steward of Rouergue, killed many of his men, and made him flee. The prince sent for Chandos, who came to his help, and some fighting took place, though war was not yet declared. His health was now so poor that he could not take part in active operations. By 18 March, more than nine hundred towns, castles, and other places signalled their support of the French cause.

Prince Edward had already warned his father of the intentions of the French king, but there was evidently a party at Edward III's court that was jealous of the prince's power (probably including the prince's younger brother, John of Gaunt), and his warnings were slighted. In April 1369, however, war was declared. Edward III sent the Earls of Cambridge and Pembroke to the prince's assistance, and Sir Robert Knolles again took service with him. The war in Aquitaine was desultory and, though the English maintained their ground fairly in the field, their hold on the country weakened every day the fighting dragged on.

On 1 January 1370, Prince Edward sustained a heavy loss in the death of Chandos. Several efforts were made by Edward to conciliate the Gascon lords, but they were fruitless and can only have served to weaken the prince's authority. It is probable that John of Gaunt was working against him at the English court, and when he was sent out in the summer to help his elder brother, he came with such extensive powers that he almost seemed as though he had come to supersede him.

In the spring, Charles raised two large armies for the invasion of Aquitaine; one, under Louis I, Duke of Anjou, was to enter Guyenne by La Reole and Bergerac, the other, under John, Duke of Berry, was to march towards Limousin and Quercy, and both were to unite and besiege the prince in Angoulême. Though he was ill, Edward gathered an army at Cognac, where he was joined by the Barons of Poitou and Saintonge, and the Earls of Cambridge, Lancaster, and Pembroke. The two French armies took many cities, united and laid siege to Limoges, which was surrendered to them by the bishop, Jean de Murat de Cros, who had been one of the prince's trusted friends.

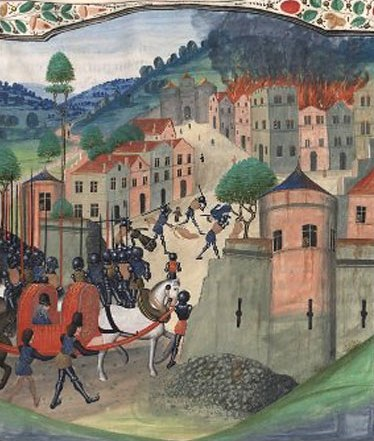
14th-century illustration of the Siege of Limoges in 1370

When Prince Edward heard of the surrender of Limoges to the French, he swore that he would have the place again, and make its residents pay for treason. He set out from Cognac with an army of about 4,000 men. Due to his illness, he was unable to mount his horse, and was carried in a litter. During the Siege of Limoges, the prince was determined to take the town and ordered the undermining of its walls. On 19 September, his miners succeeded in demolishing a large piece of wall which filled the ditches with its ruins. The town was then stormed, with the inevitable destruction and loss of life.

Historians John Froissart and William Hunt write that when the bishop was brought before Edward, he told the bishop that his head should be cut off (Lancaster stopped him from doing this) and that the city was nonetheless pillaged and burnt, and 3,000 persons of all ranks and ages were massacred. However, modern scholarship, drawing on a wider range of evidence, places casualties much lower than Froissart does – around 300 garrison soldiers and civilians in total. Edward returned to Cognac; his sickness increased, and he was forced to give up all hope of being able to direct any further operations, and to proceed first to Angoulême, and then to Bordeaux.

== Return to England ==
The death of Edward's eldest son Edward of Angoulême in 1371 caused him a great deal of grief. His health continued to deteriorate, and his personal doctor advised him to return to England. Edward left Aquitaine with the Duke of Lancaster and landed at Southampton early in January 1371. Edward met his father at Windsor. At this meeting, Prince Edward interceded to stop a treaty Edward III had concluded the previous month with Charles of Navarre because he objected to the ceding of lands to King Charles. After this, Edward returned to his manor in Berkhamsted.

On his return to England, Edward was publicly recognised as the natural opponent of the anti-clerical and Lancastrian party's influence. On 2 May, he met the convocation of Canterbury at the Savoy and persuaded them to make an exceptionally large grant. His health began to improve, and in August 1372, he sailed with his father to the relief of Thouars; but contrary winds meant that the fleet never reached the French coast. On 6 October, he resigned the principality of Aquitaine and Gascony, giving as his reason that its revenues were no longer sufficient to cover expenses. He acknowledged his resignation in Parliament the next month. At the conclusion of this parliament, after the knights had been dismissed, he met the citizens and burgesses "in a room near the white chamber" and prevailed on them to extend the customs granted the year before for the protection of merchant shipping for another year.

Edward's illness returned in force, though when the "Good Parliament" met on 28 April 1376, he was the House of Commons' main ally in their criticism of the administration, and evidently acted in concert with William of Wykeham in opposing the influence of Lancaster, and he had good reason to fear that his brother's power would prove dangerous to the prospects of his son Richard. Richard Lyons, the king's financial agent who was impeached for gigantic frauds, sent him a bribe of £1,000 and other gifts, but Edward refused it. He later said he regretted not keeping and sending it to his soldiers.

== Death ==
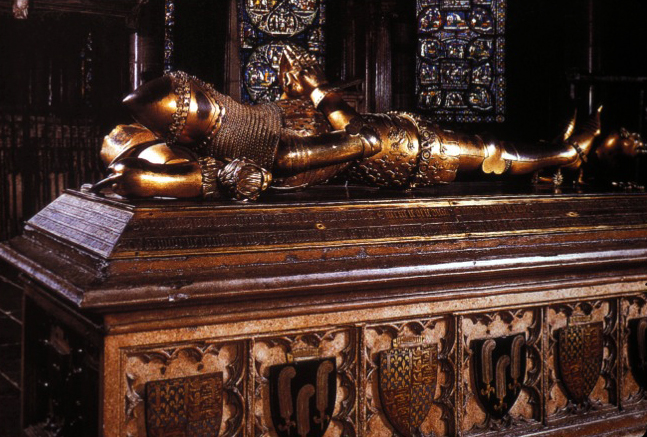
Edward's tomb in Canterbury Cathedral

Following the Good Parliament, Edward knew that he was dying. His fits of dysentery had become so violent they sometimes made him faint. (Note: It is widely believed that he contracted amoebic dysentery, but some argue against the likelihood that he could sustain a ten-year battle with dysentery. Other possible diagnoses include nephritis, cirrhosis, or a combination of these. (Green 2007, p. 73; MacNalty 1955, p. 411).) He left gifts for his servants in his will, and said goodbye to Edward III, whom he asked to confirm his gifts, pay his debts quickly out of his estate, and protect his son Richard. Edward's illness likely started after the Battle of Nájera, and relapsed at various points until his death. His death may have been caused by P. vivax malaria, brucellosis, inflammatory bowel disease, long-term complications of acute dysentery (probably not chronic dysentery), or similar conditions.

His death was announced at the Palace of Westminster on 8 June 1376. (Note: It is asserted by Caxton, in his continuation of the "Polychronicon", cap.8, that the Prince died at his manor of Kennington and that his body was brought to Westminster on 8 July, Trinity Sunday, a day he had always kept with special reverence (Hunt 1889, p. 101 cites Chandos, vol. 1. p. 4201)) In his last moments, he was attended by the Bishop of Bangor who urged him to ask forgiveness of God and of all those he had injured.

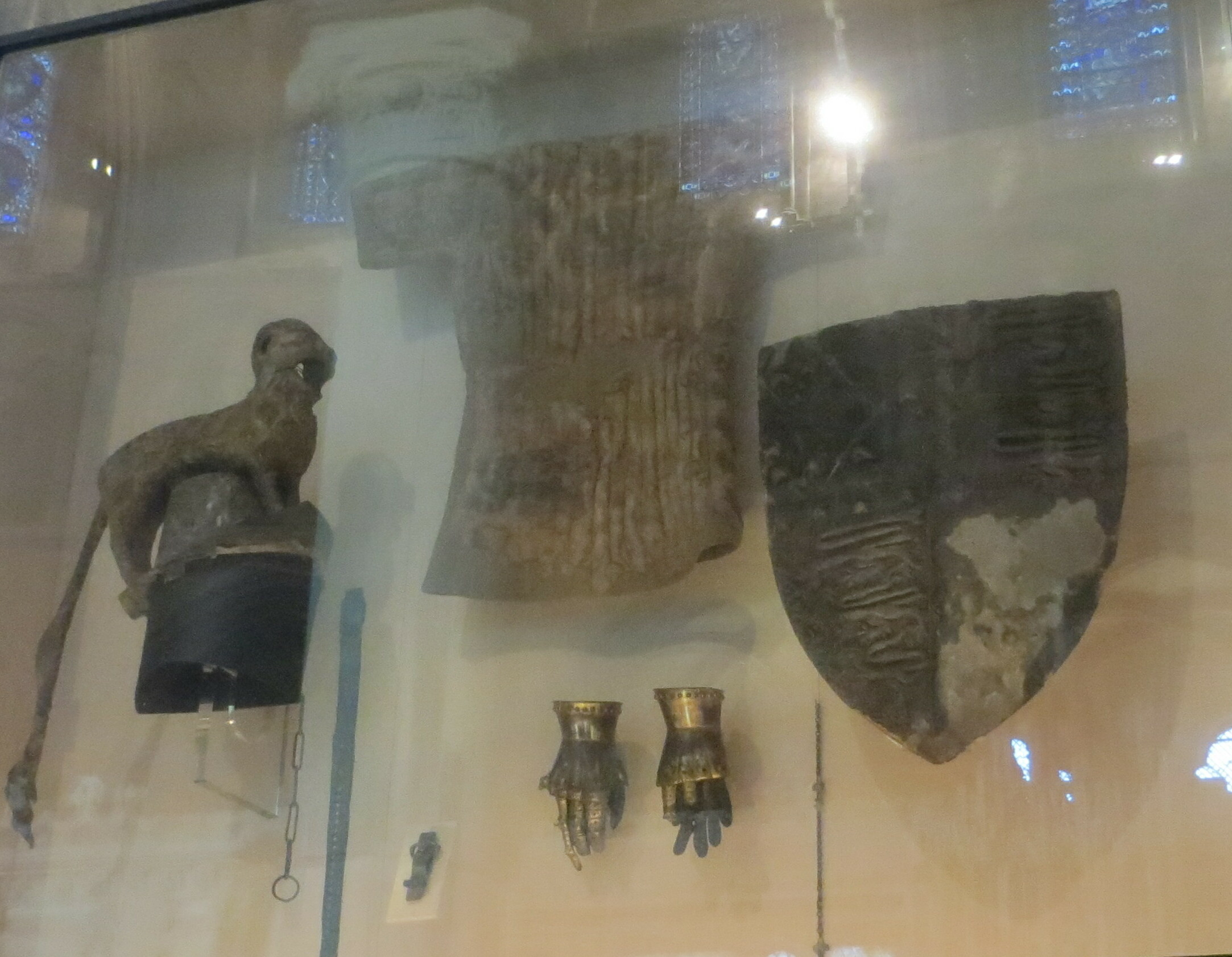
Edward's heraldic achievements on display in Canterbury Cathedral

Edward was buried in Canterbury Cathedral on 29 September. His funeral and the design of his tomb were made according to his will's instructions. It has a bronze effigy beneath a tester depicting the Holy Trinity with his heraldic achievements—his surcoat, helmet, shield and gauntlets—hung over the tester. They have since been replaced with replicas; the originals now reside in a glass-fronted cabinet within the cathedral. His epitaph, inscribed around his effigy, is in French; one English translation reads, in part:

Such as thou art, sometime was I.
Such as I am, such shalt thou be.
I thought little on th'our of Death
So long as I enjoyed breath.
On earth I had great riches
Land, houses, great treasure, horses, money and gold.
But now a wretched captive am I,
Deep in the ground, lo here I lie.
My beauty great, is all quite gone,
My flesh is wasted to the bone.

== Arms and heraldic badge ==
Coat of arms of the Black Prince which indicates that he is heir to the English throne.

The Black Prince's shield. (Note: The shield of Edward the Black Prince: Quarterly, 1 and 4 France (ancient); 2 and 3 England, and a label of three points argent)

The "shield for peace", with the ich dien motto. (Note: The ich dien motto is attributed to Edward according to a long-standing but unhistorical tradition (Siddons 2009, pp. 178–190).)

Arms: Quarterly, 1st and 4th azure semée of fleur-de-lys or (France Ancient); 2nd and 3rd gules, three lions passant guardant or (England); overall a label of three points argent. Crest: On a chapeau gules turned up ermine, a lion statant or gorged with a label of three points argent. Mantling: gules lined ermine. Edward's coat of arms as Prince of Wales were those of the kingdom, differenced by a label of three points argent. Edward also used an alternative coat of Sable, three ostrich feathers argent, described as his "shield for peace" (probably meaning the shield he used for jousting). (Note: Regarding the account that the prince took the 'crest of three ostrich feathers' and the motto "Ich dien" from the King John of Bohemia, who died in the Battle of Crécy, it may be noted: 1) as to the 'ostrich feathers', that in the manuscript of John of Arderne's Medica, written by William Seton, is an ostrich feather used as a mark of reference to a previous page, on which the same device occurs, "ubi depingitur penna principis Walliæ", with the remark: "Et nota quod talem pennam albam portabat Edwardus, primogenitus E. regis Angliæ, super cristam suam, et illam pennam conquisivit de Rege Boemiæ, quem interfecit apud Cresy in francia", Although the reference and remark in Sloane MS. 56 may be by Seton and not by Arderne, the prince's physician, it is evident that probably before the prince's death, the ostrich feather was recognised as his peculiar badge, assumed after the Battle of Crécy. While the crest of John of Bohemia was the entire wings of a vulture "besprinkled with linden leaves of gold" the ostrich seems to have been the badge of his house; it was borne by Queen Anne of Bohemia, as well as by her brother Wenceslaus IV of Bohemia, and is on her effigy on her tomb. The feather badge appears as two feathers on four seals of the prince, and as three feathers on the alternate escutcheons placed on his tomb in accordance with the directions of his will. In his will, the prince said that the feathers were "for peace", meaning for jousts and tournaments, and calls them his 'badge', not his 'crest'. Although the ostrich feather was his special badge, it was placed on some plate belonging to his mother, was used in the form of one or more feathers by various members of the royal house, and (by grant of Richard II), by Thomas de Mowbray, 1st Duke of Norfolk. The story of the prince's winning the feathers was printed, probably for the first time, by Camden in his Remaines. In his first edition (1605), he states that it was "at the battle of Poictiers", but corrects this in his next edition (1614), Secondly, as to the motto, it appears that the prince used two mottoes, "Houmout" and "Ich dien", which are both used as a signature on a letter under his privy seal. In his will, he directed that "Houmout" should be written on each of the escutcheons round his tomb. But it actually occurs only over the escutcheons bearing his arms, while over the alternate escutcheons with his badge, and also on the escroll upon the quill of each feather, are the words ich diene [sic]. "Houmout" is interpreted as meaning 'high mood' or 'courage'. No early tradition connects "Ich dien" with John of Bohemia. Like "Houmout", it is probably old Flemish or Low German. Camden in his 'Remaines' (in the passage cited above) says that it is old English, "Ic die", meaning "I serve", and that the prince "adjoyned" the motto to the feathers, and he connects it with the prince's position as heir, referring to Ep. to Galatians, iv. 1.) This shield can be seen several times on his tomb chest, alternating with the differenced royal arms. John of Gaunt used a similar shield on which the ostrich feathers were ermine. Edward's "shield for peace" is believed to have inspired the badge of three ostrich feathers used by later Princes of Wales. The motto "Ich dien" means "I serve".

== Family ==
Edward married his half-first cousin once removed Joan, Countess of Kent, in early 1361. Their wedding was conducted in secret, and was later annulled the same year because of lack of needed dispensation, but afterwards the couple managed to obtain the necessary documents and married once again on 10 October 1361. Joan was the daughter and heiress of Edmund, Earl of Kent, the younger son of King Edward I by his second wife Margaret of France. She and Edward had two sons, both born in Aquitaine:

- Edward of Angoulême, born at Angoulême on 27 January 1365, died shortly before his father's return to England in January 1371, and was buried in the church of the Austin Friars, London
- Richard, who succeeded his grandfather as king

From his marriage to Joan he also became stepfather to her children by Thomas Holland:

- Thomas Holland, 2nd Earl of Kent, whose daughter, Joan Holland, later married Edward's brother, Edmund of Langley.
- John Holland, 1st Duke of Exeter, who married Edward's niece, Elizabeth of Lancaster, daughter of his brother, John of Gaunt.
- Joan Holland, Duchess of Brittany, who married John IV, Duke of Brittany
- Maud Holland, Lady Courtenay, Countess of Ligny, Countess of St Pol, who married firstly, Hugh Courtenay, grandson of Hugh de Courtenay, 10th Earl of Devon; Secondly, Waleran III of Luxembourg, Count of Ligny. One Daughter from the marriage to Waleran III of Luxembourg
- Edmund Holland (c. 1354), who died young

Edward had several natural sons before his marriage.

With Edith de Willesford (died after 1385):

- Sir Roger Clarendon (c. 1352 – executed 1402); he married Margaret (d. 1382), a daughter of John Fleming, Baron de la Roche.

With unknown mother:

- Sir John Sounders

== Appellation "Black Prince" ==
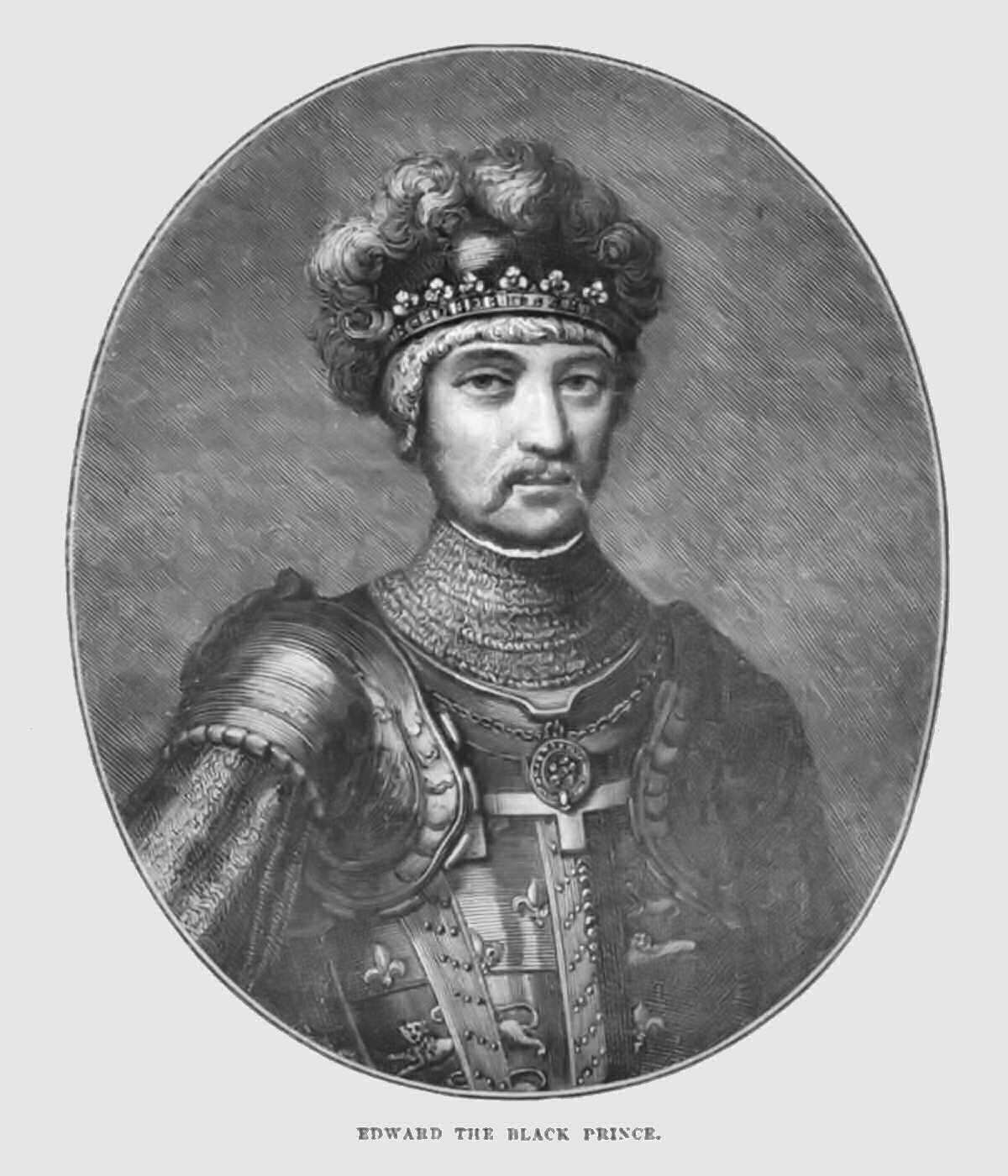
C. 1902 illustration of Edward

Edward is often referred to as the "Black Prince". The first known source to use this sobriquet was the antiquary John Leland in the 1530s or early 1540s (about 165 years after Edward's death). Leland mentions it in two manuscript notes of this period, with the implication that it was relatively common by that date. In one instance, he refers in Latin to "Edwardi Principis cog: Nigri" (i.e., "Edward the Prince, cognomen: The Black"); in the other, in English to "the Blake Prince". In both instances, Leland is summarising earlier works – respectively, the 14th-century Eulogium Historiarum and the late 15th-century chronicle formerly attributed to John Warkworth – but in neither case does the name appear in his source texts. In print, Roger Ascham in his 1545 Toxophilus refers to "ye noble black prince Edward beside Poeters"; while Richard Grafton in his 1569 Chronicle at Large uses the name on three occasions, saying that "some writers name him the black prince", and elsewhere that he was "commonly called the black Prince". Raphael Holinshed uses it several times in his 1577 Chronicles; and it is also used by William Shakespeare in his plays Richard II (written c. 1595; Act 2, scene 3) and Henry V (c. 1599; Act 2, scene 4). In 1688, it appears in the title of Joshua Barnes's The History of that Most Victorious Monarch, Edward III, [and his] Son, Edward, Prince of Wales and of Aquitain, Sirnamed the Black-Prince.

The origins of the name are uncertain, though many theories have been proposed, falling under two main themes, that it is derived from Edward's black shield (and/or the rumours that he wore black armour), or from his brutal reputation, particularly towards the French in Aquitaine. It was possibly intended as a double entendre.

The black (sable) field of his "shield for peace" is well documented. However, there is no sound evidence that Edward wore black armour; John Harvey refers to an unnamed, "shadowy" French report that Edward served "in black armour of burnished steel" (en armure noire en fer bruni) at the Battle of Crécy. Richard Barber suggests that the name's origins may have lain in pageantry, in that a tradition may have grown up in the 15th century of representing the prince in black armour. He points out that several chronicles refer to him as Edward IV (the title he would have taken as king had he outlived his father): this name would obviously have become confusing when the actual Edward IV succeeded in 1461, and this may have been the period when an alternative had to be found.

Edward's reputation for brutality in France is well documented, and it is possible that this is where the title had its origins. French soldier Philippe de Mézières refers to Edward as the greatest of the "black boars"—the era's aggressors who had disrupted peace within Christendom. Other French writers made similar associations, and Peter Hoskins reports that an oral tradition of L'Homme Noir, who had passed by with an army, survived in southern France until recent years. In Shakespeare's Henry V, the King of France alludes to "that black name, Edward, Black Prince of Wales". John Speed reported in 1611 that the Black Prince was so named "not of his colour, but of his dreaded Acts in battell"; a comment echoed in 1642 by Thomas Fuller, who wrote that he was named "from his dreaded acts and not from his complexion". Joshua Barnes claimed in 1688 that it was after the Battle of Crécy that "the French began to call [him] Le Neoir, or the Black-Prince", appearing to cite a record of 2 Richard II (i.e. 1378–1379); but his reference is insufficiently precise to be traceable. However, it is unclear how a French sobriquet might have crossed to England, and Barber finds this derivation of the name "unlikely".

=== Historiography and legacy ===
Edward the Black Prince has been a common subject in scholarly work and interest of the period and beyond specifically in the Georgian and Victorian periods. One of the sources of the romanticised historical view of Edward came from a biography written in 1836. A more modern source looks at Edward's role in promoting patriotism and chivalry. Another modern look at Edward has a much broader scope in that it uses his military career to look at the Hundred Years War, and other developments in Medieval European History.

== See also ==
- Black Prince's Ruby, a spinel Edward forced Peter of Castile to give to him after the Castilian campaign.
- Black Prince (tank), a British tank used in World War II.
- HMS Black Prince, for Royal Navy ships named in his honour
- List of knights and ladies of the Garter

== Notes ==
Edward the Black Prince House of Plantagenet Born: 15 June 1330 Died: 8 June 1376
English royalty
Preceded by Edward III	Prince of Aquitaine; 1362–1372	Succeeded by Edward III
Vacant Title last held by English title: Edward of Carnarvon; Welsh title: Dafydd ap Gruffudd (1283)	Prince of Wales; 1343–1376	Vacant Title next held by English title: Richard of Bordeaux
New title	Duke of Cornwall; 1337–1376	Vacant Title next held by Richard of Bordeaux
