= Tomb of Edward, the Black Prince =

Tomb in Canterbury Cathedral

Coordinates: 51.27965°N 1.08366°E

Tomb of the Black Prince
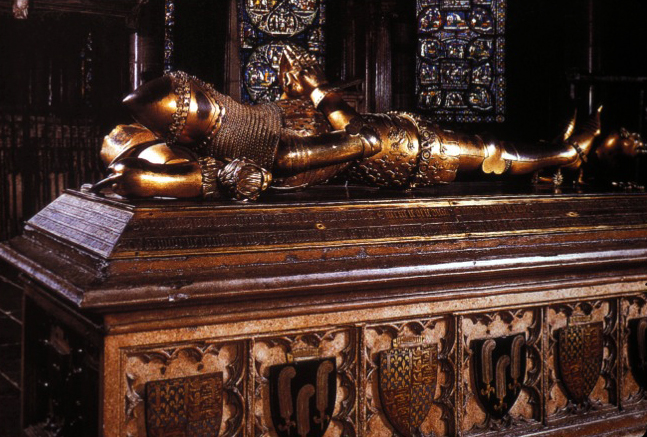
- Material: Effigy: Gilt cast copper-alloy Tomb-chest: Marble.
- Created: After 1376
- Period/culture: Gothic
- Present location: Canterbury Cathedral, Kent, England

The tomb of Edward, the Black Prince, was built in the 14th century for Edward of Woodstock (d. 1376). He was the son of King Edward III and heir apparent to the English throne until his early death from dysentery, aged 45. Due to his role in the Hundred Years' War and his characteristic black plate armour, Edward became known to history as "the Black Prince". Aware that he was dying and mindful of his legacy, his will (signed the day before he died) specified his desired place of burial. The will contained detailed stipulations as to the design of his tomb and that it be located in the Trinity Chapel of Canterbury Cathedral, in Kent, England, where his body is still interred.

The tomb consists of a recumbent tomb effigy, a tomb chest and a tester holding his heraldic achievements. Due to its highly detailed armour, the effigy is considered one of the most important examples of English medieval funerary art given that so few examples of contemporary armour survive. According to Jessica Barker of the Courtauld Institute of Art, "there is something deeply affecting about the way his armor is depicted on the tomb ... This isn't just any armor—it is his armor...replicated with complete fidelity even down to tiny details like the position of rivets."

== Life and death of Edward of Woodstock ==
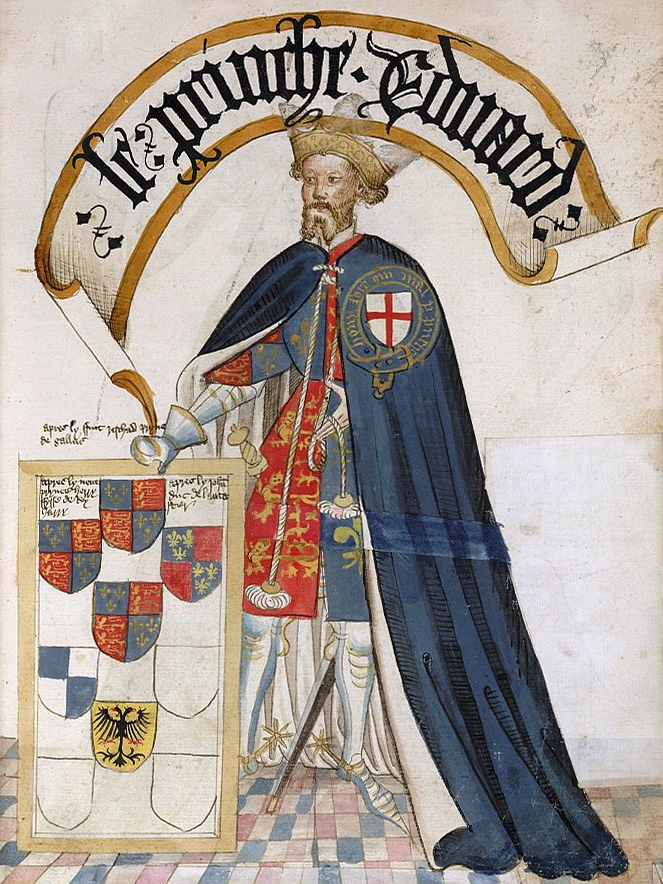
Edward portrayed c. 1440–1450 wearing a blue mantle over plate armour and a surcoat. Bruges Garter Book, British Library

Edward became known as the "Black Prince" due to his distinctive black plate armour and reputation for "savagery as a military commander"; he has been accused of ordering the massacre of hundreds of men, women and children in the sack following the Siege of Limoges in 1370. He was the eldest son and heir apparent of King Edward III, but died young and before his father, leaving his son Richard II to succeed to the throne. Nevertheless, historians often give Edward the distinction of having been one of the most successful English commanders during the Hundred Years' War.

Edward's slow death from dysentery aged 45 took a number of weeks, but he remained lucid and aware. He died on 8 June 1376 at the Royal Palace of Westminster, and per his wishes was buried at an extravagant ceremony in Canterbury Cathedral, Kent, on 29 September. His funeral was conducted strictly in accordance with the instructions outlined in his will, which he signed in the days before his demise. The will was written in French and is now at the Lambeth Palace Library in London. It contains highly detailed descriptions of his tomb's design, including the materials to be used and a stipulation that he be depicted "fully armed in plate of war".

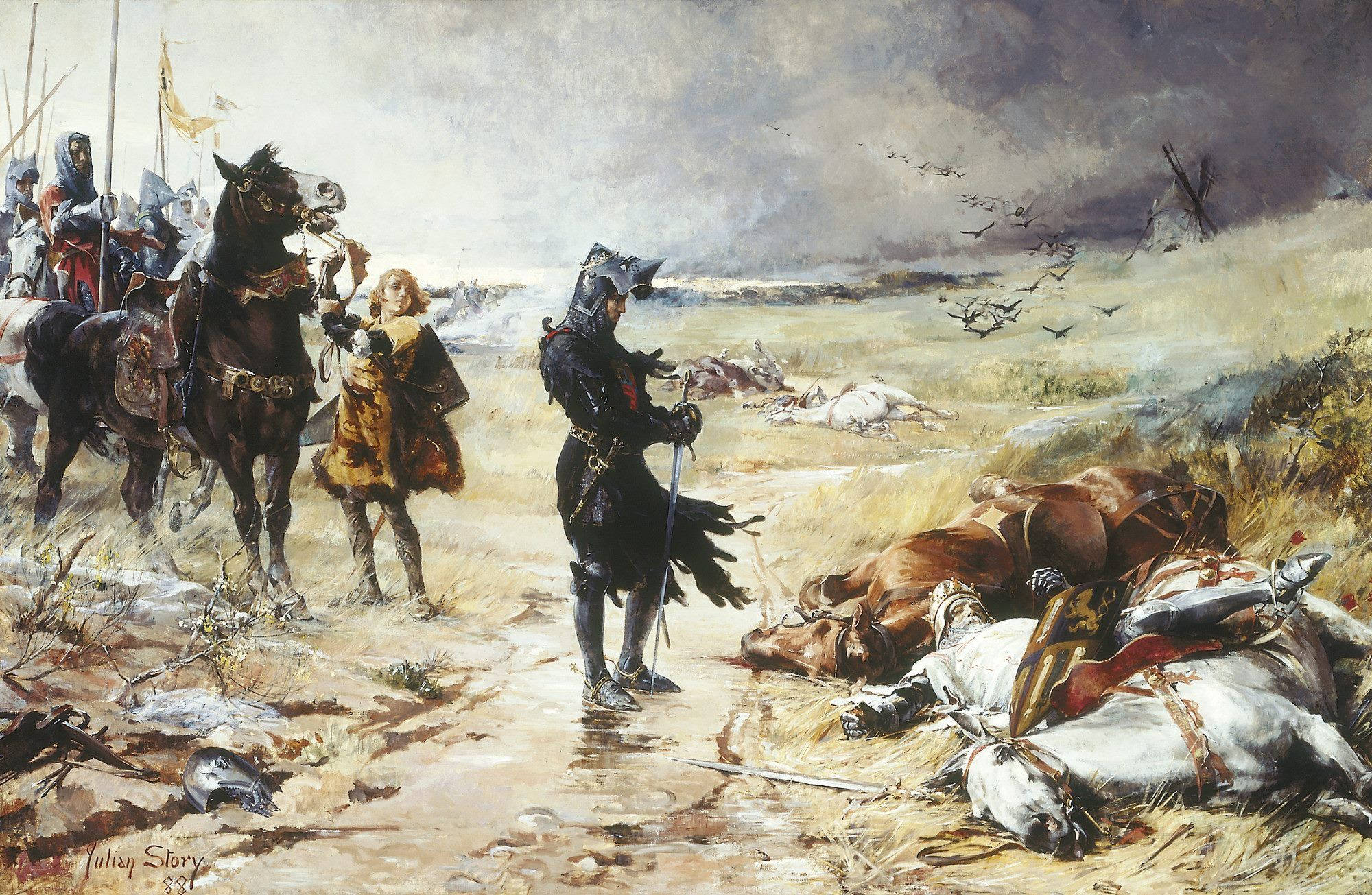
The Black Prince at Crécy by Julian Russell Story, 1888. Telfair Museums, Savannah, Georgia, United States

His will contains the full text of the epithet, and that the monument was to be positioned 10 ft (3.0 m) from the altar of the chapel of Our Lady of the Undercroft in Canterbury Cathedral. His choice of Canterbury Cathedral was influenced by his belief that Thomas Becket (d. 1170 and also interred in the Trinity Chapel) had interceded to aid him at the Battle of Poitiers, which he led against the French army commanded by King John II, on 19 September 1356, during the Hundred Years' War. Edward instructed that "two warhorses, covered with trappings of my own armour and equipment, proceed before my body ... carrying all my banners, badges and insignia". Richard arranged and paid for the construction of his father's monument, adhering to Edward's design. At the same time, Edward's father honoured his son's outstanding debts, which were significant: at the time of his death, Edward owed 94 creditors a total of £2,972 (c. £2.2m in July 2023).

== Description ==
The monument is positioned within a tall protective iron gate, and below a tester that once held his heraldic achievements. The tester's imagery includes iconography related to the Holy Trinity, reflecting his membership of the knightly Order of the Garter who acted under the patronage of the Trinity.

=== Effigy ===
The effigy is made from gilt bronze and shows Edward lying recumbent in full plate armour. The metal plates are held together by an intricate system of bolts and pins. The garments worn over his armour include a bascinet (an open-faced helmet), a ceremonial cap, an aventail (rows of chain mail), a leopard crest, and an arse-girdle. The intricate metalwork is so similar to the types worn by contemporary knights that modern historians believe that the designer was an experienced and highly placed designer of knightly armour.

Edward is shown with open eyes, with his head resting on a helm. His hands are joined in prayer, and his feet are placed on an animal that is most likely a leopard.

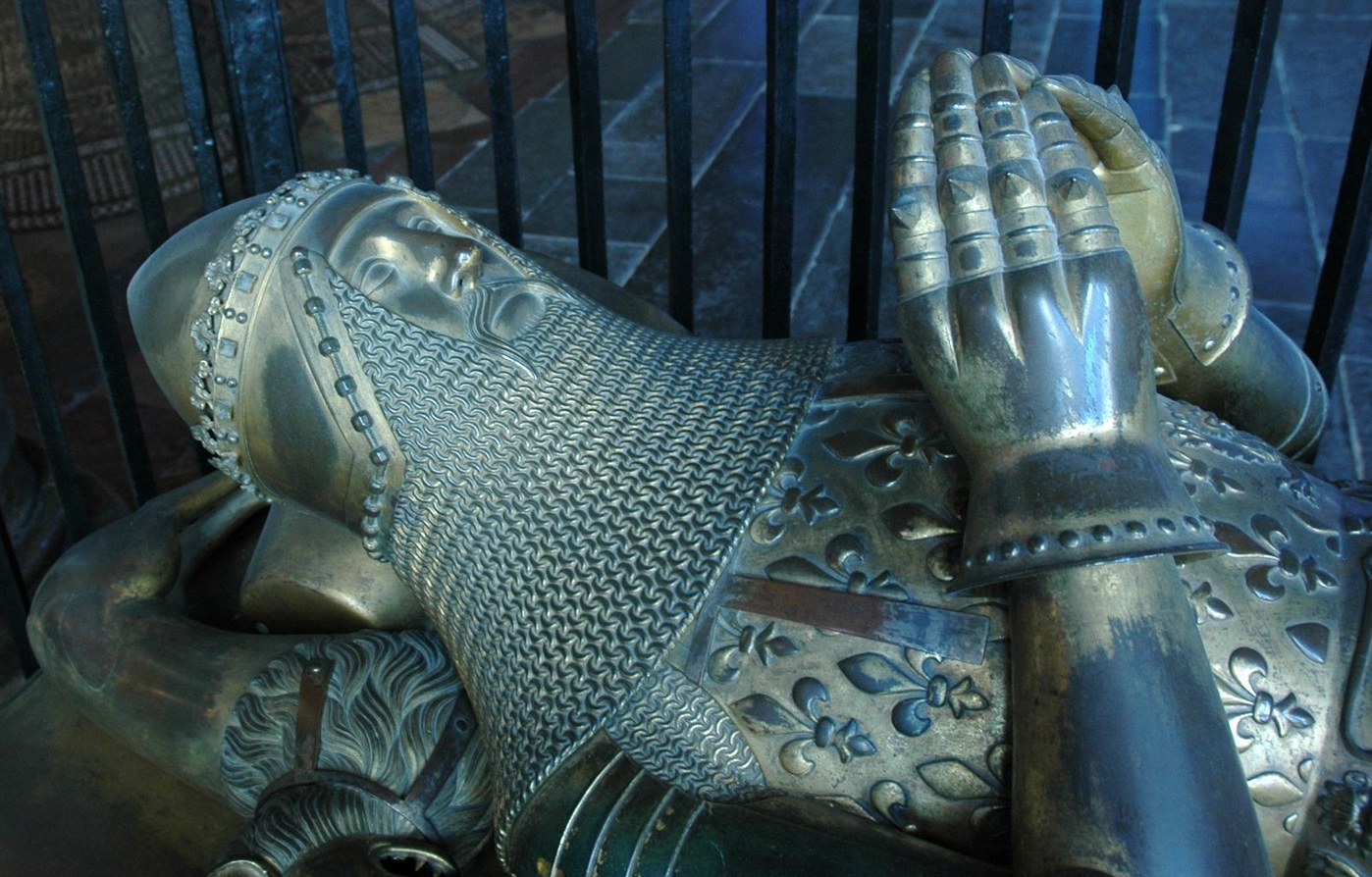
Detail of the armour.

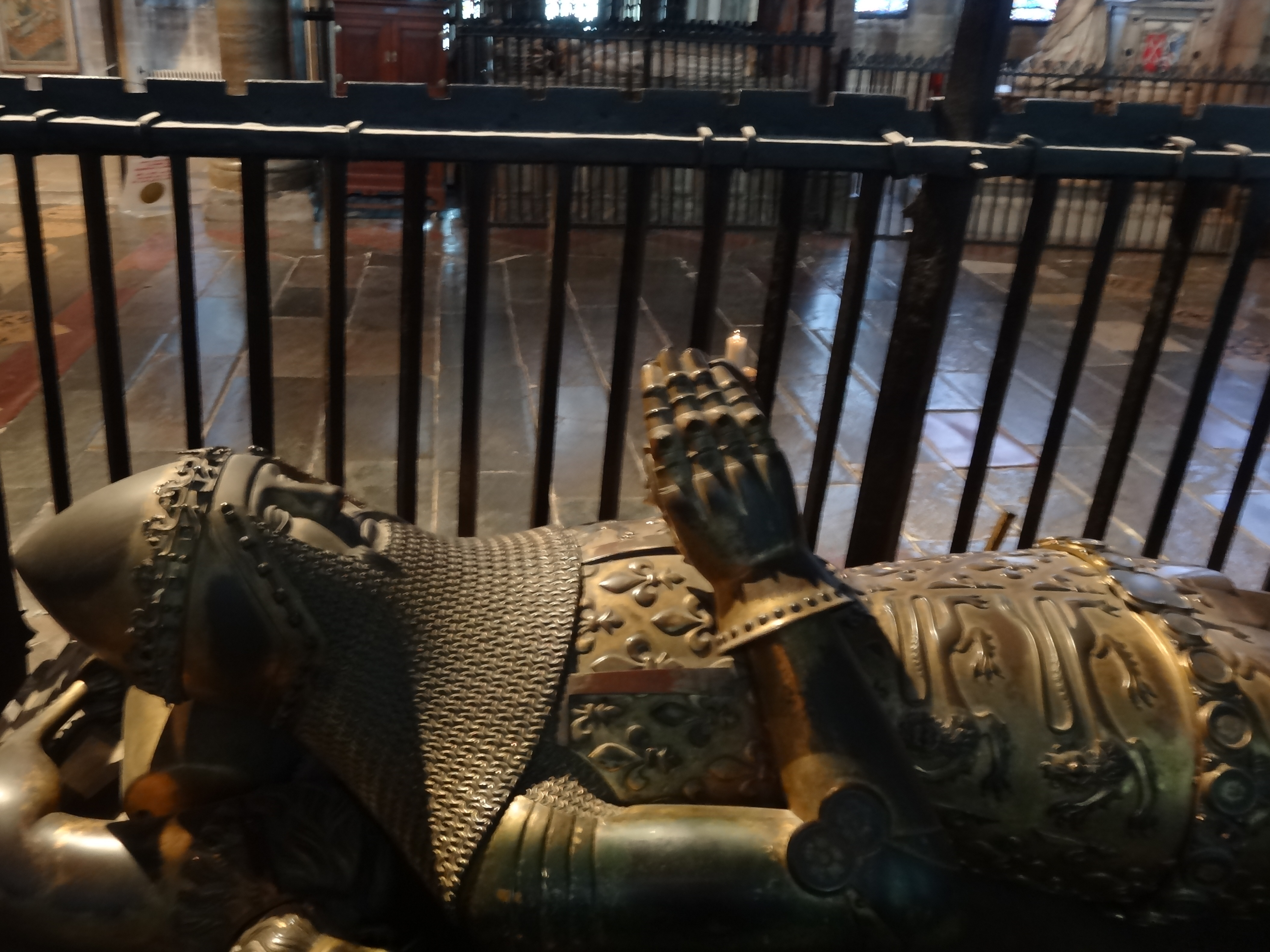
Detail showing the iron gate enclosure.

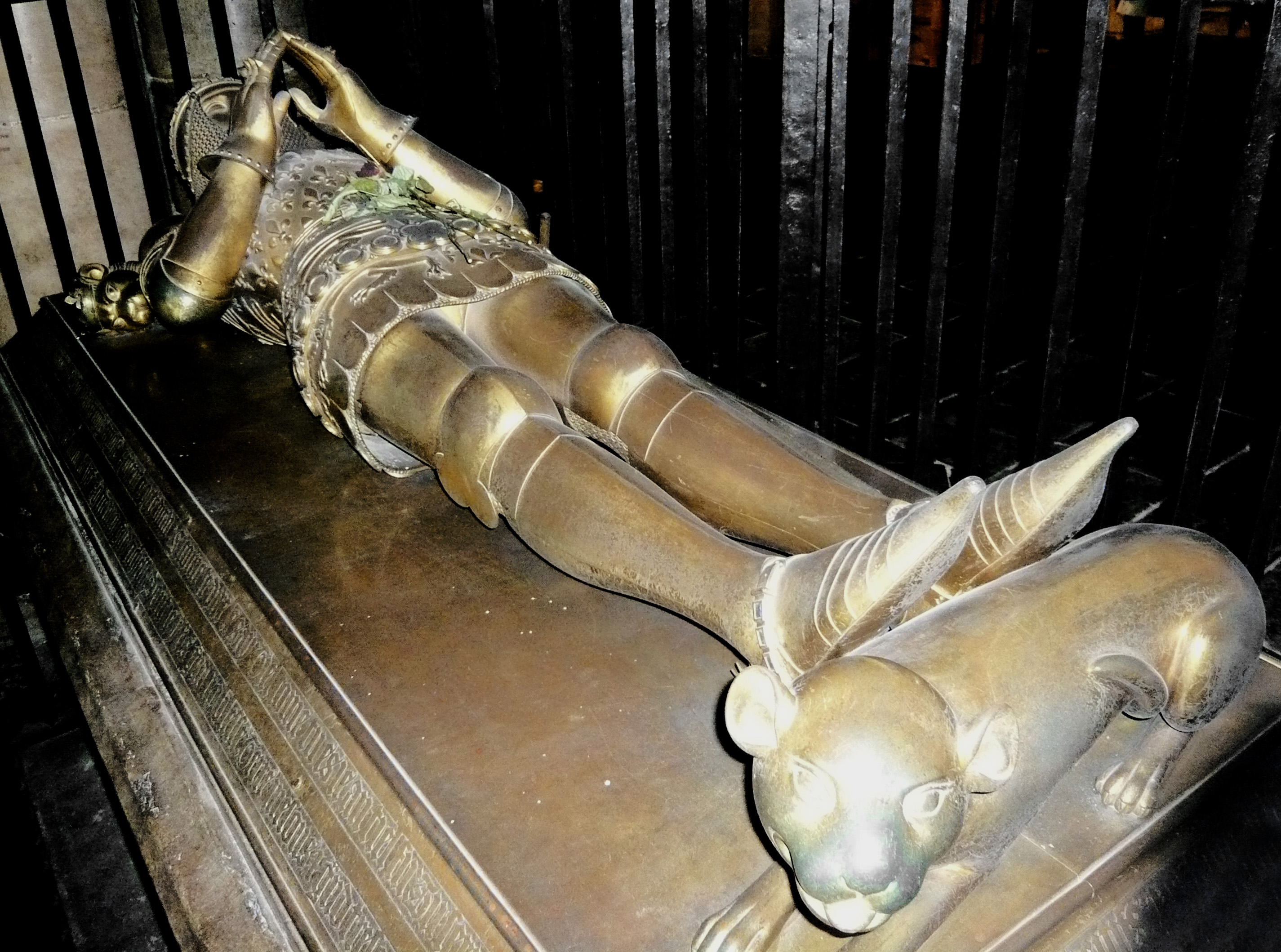
Full length view with lion resting at his feet.

=== Epitaph ===
The epitaph is written in French and inscribed on two rows on the upper edge of the tomb-chest. Its 16 lines of verse are directly transcribed from Edward's will, with some minor changes in wording. Edward chose text that emphasises his pride in his military achievements but also showed him humbled before God. According to the historian David Green, the text describes "the inevitable corruption of all earthly things ... [and] a sense of disgust and pity for the human condition". It in part translates as: "But now a caitiff poor am I, deep in the ground lo here I lie. My beauty great is all quite gone, my flesh is wasted to the bone". (Note: The full text reads "Who so thou be that passes by, where these corpse entombed lie: understand what I shall say as at this time speak I may. Such as thou art, so once was I, such as I am, such shalt thou be. I little thought on the hour of death so long as I enjoyed breath. Great riches here did I possess whereof I made great nobleness. I had gold, silver, wardrobes and great treasure, horses, houses, land. But now a poor caitiff am I, deep in the ground lo here I lie. My great beauty is all quite gone, my flesh is wasted to the bone. My house narrow and throng, nothing but truth comes from my tongue. And if you should see me this day, I do not think that you would say that I had never been a man, so altered now I am. For God’s sake pray to the heavenly king that my soul to heaven would bring. All they that pray and make accord for me unto my God and Lord: God place them in his Paradise wherein no wretched caitiff lies.") Green notes the contrast between the splendour of the effigy and the humbleness of the inscription.

Although the date that the inscription was added is unknown, it is believed to have been sometime between 1377 and 1380. Scholars have identified one inspiration as the "Disciplina clericalis", a popular early 12th-century collection of verse (some of Arabian origin), originally written in Latin by Petrus Alphonsi (d. after 1116) and later translated to French. This indicates that he (or his clerics or advisors) had some literary awareness, given that few other English medieval epitaphs are derived from literary sources.

=== Tomb-chest ===
The tomb chest is made—as Edward had specified—from marble "of good masonry". It is lined with twelve panels, each one foot in width. Six show his arms, and six contain the three ostrich plumes representing his role as the Prince of Wales, and each containing his motto "houmout" (high spirits); which he interpreted as being possessed of, according to Green, an "almost supernatural strength" and leadership, which he felt he had displayed at the Battle of Poitiers, the Battle of Nájera and later victories.

Thus, he asked that his burial reflect his life as a warrior. His heraldic achievements (heraldic symbols to which the bearer of a coat of arms is entitled), consisting of his surcoat (a padded tunic), helmet, shield and gauntlets, have been replaced with replicas; the originals are now in a nearby glass cabinet. As of 2017 they were scheduled for restoration, after which they would again be placed above the monument.

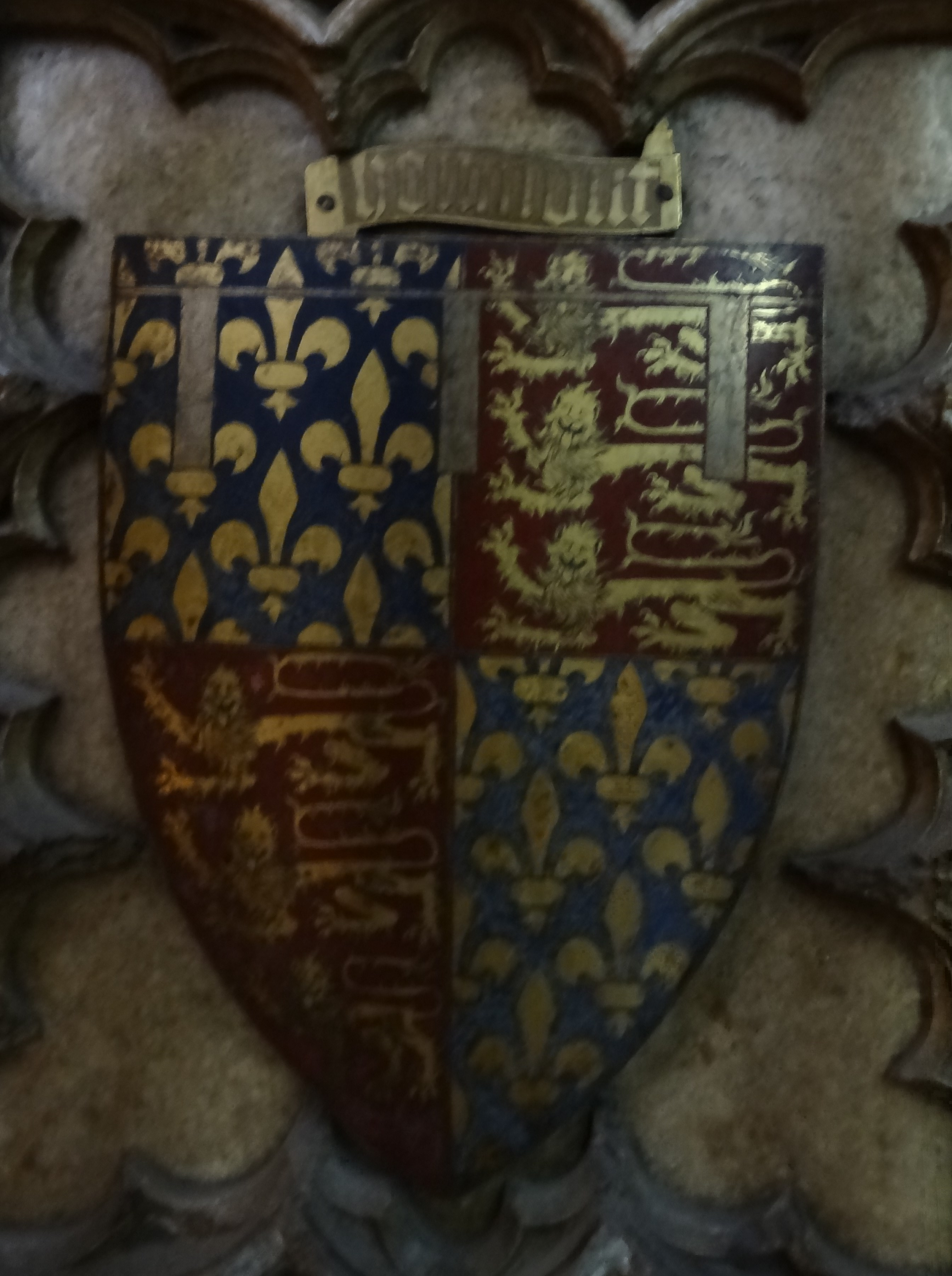
Shield with coat of arms showing fleur-de-lis and leopards

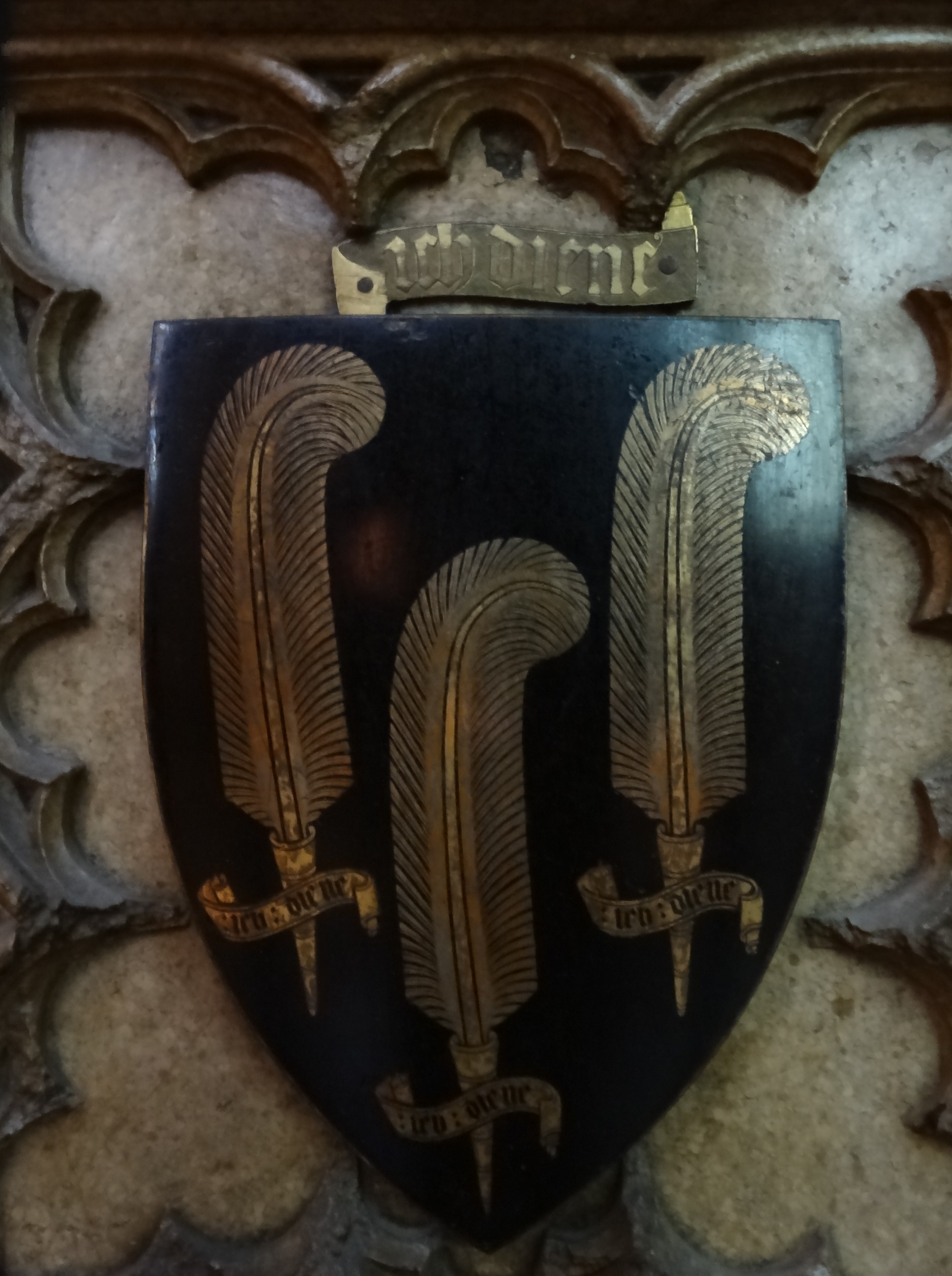
Shield with ostrich plumes

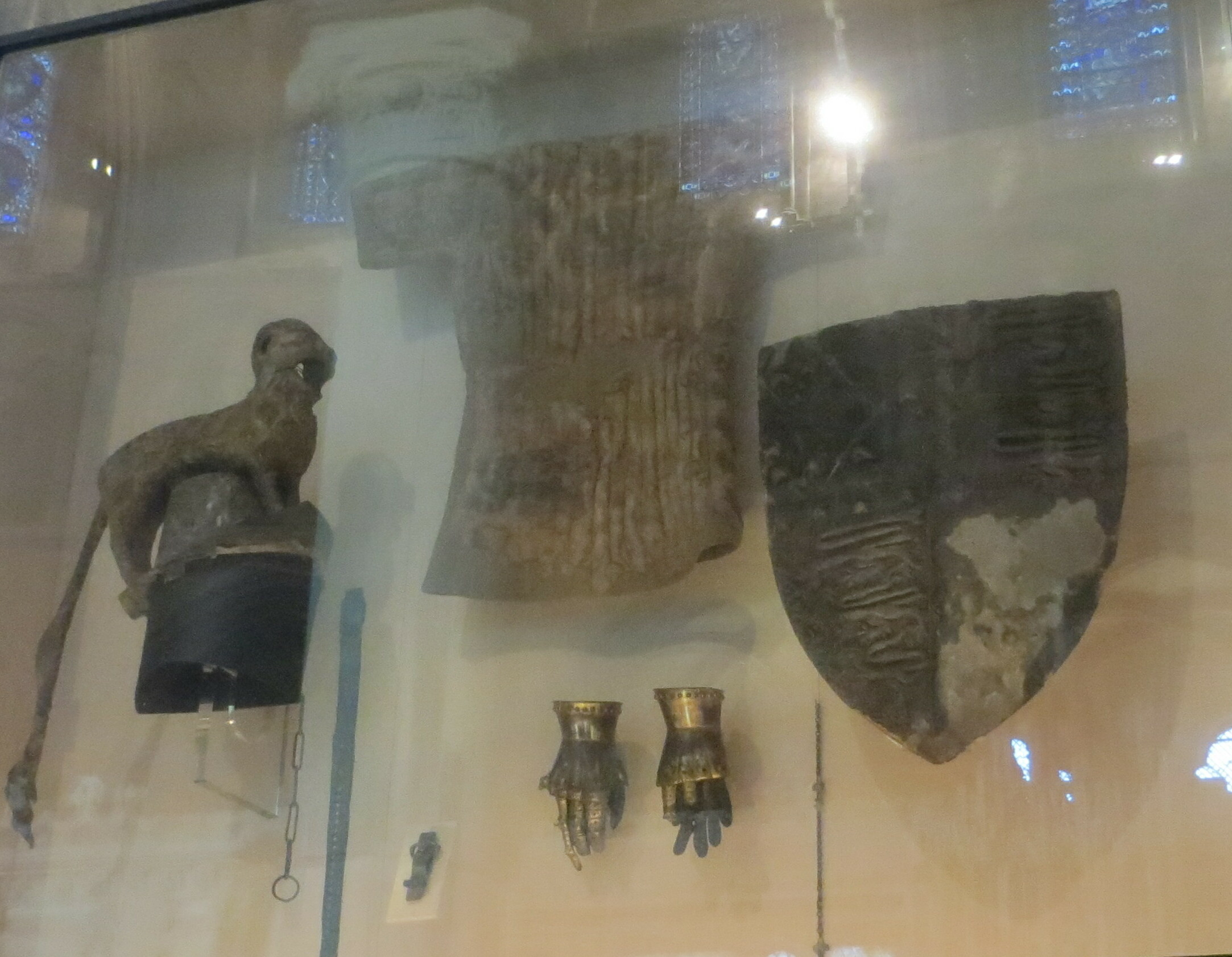
The original funerary hatchments

== Sources ==
- Barker, Jessica; Mcarthur, Graeme; Pegues, Emily. "Fully armed in plate of war’: making the effigy of the Black Prince Archived 2023-07-01 at the Wayback Machine". The Burlington Magazine, 19 October 2021
- Green, David. Edward the Black Prince: A Study of Power in Medieval Europe. London: Routledge, 2007. ISBN 1-0322-4968-4 (Kindle edition)
- Jones, Michael. The Black Prince. London: Head of Zeus, 2017. ISBN 978-1-7849-7293-6
- Oosterwijk, Sophie; Sally F. Badham. "Precious-metal effigial tomb monuments in medieval Europe 1080–1430". Academia.edu, 2014
- Stanley, Arthur Penrhyn. Historical Memorials of Canterbury The Landing of Augustine, The Murder of Becket, Edward the Black Prince, Becket's Shrine. Canterbury: J. Murray, 1855
- Tyson, Diana. "The Epitaph of Edward the Black Prince". Medium Ævum, volume 46, no. 1, 1977. JSTOR 43621106
