= Edward of Angoulême =

Son of Edward the Black Prince

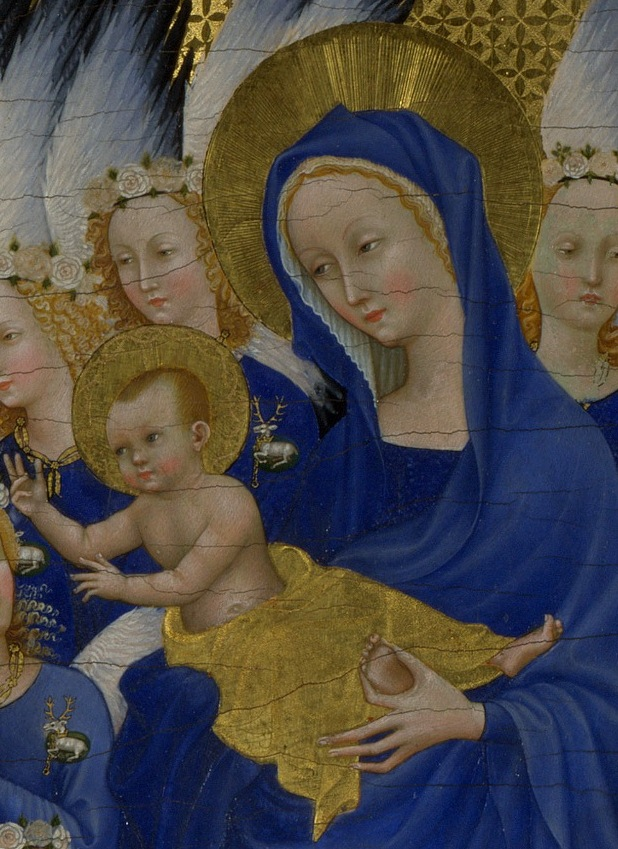
- Possible depiction of Edward and his mother Joan as the infant Jesus and the Virgin Mary on the Wilton Diptych, c. 1395
- Born: 27 January 1365; Château d'Angoulême, France
- Died: c. 20 September 1370 (aged 5); Bordeaux, France
- Burial: Austin Friars, London; Kings Langley (1388/9–bef. 1607); Bordeaux (1370–1388/9)
- House: Plantagenet
- Father: Edward the Black Prince
- Mother: Joan, Countess of Kent

Edward of Angoulême (27 January 1365 – c. 20 September 1370) was second in line to the throne of the Kingdom of England before his death. Born in Angoulême, he was the eldest child of Edward, Prince of Wales, commonly called "the Black Prince", and Joan, Countess of Kent, and thus was a member of the House of Plantagenet. Edward's birth, during the Hundred Years' War, was celebrated luxuriously by his father and by other monarchs, such as Charles V of France.

Edward died at the age of five, leaving his three-year-old brother, Richard of Bordeaux, as the new second in line. After the Black Prince's death in 1376, Richard became heir apparent to Edward III and succeeded the following year. Richard later ordered a monument to be made for his brother's tomb, which he had re-located; he also possibly depicted his brother on the Wilton Diptych.

== Life ==
=== Birth ===
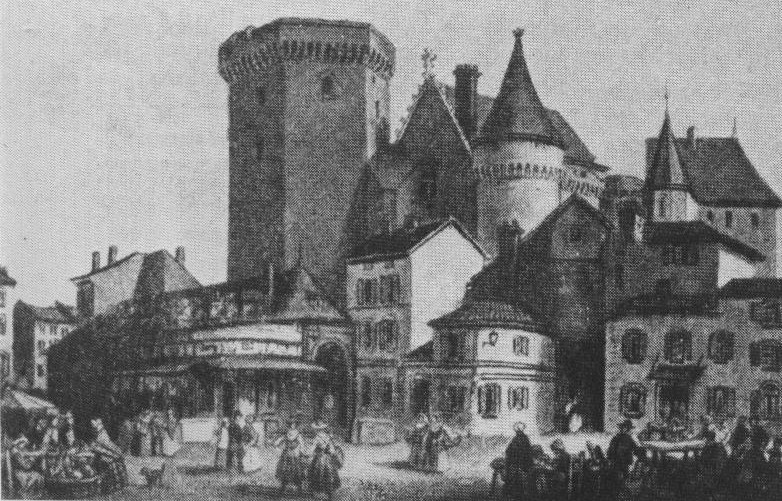
The Château d'Angoulême, c. 1800s.

Edward was born at the Château d'Angoulême, in Angoulême, then part of the Duchy of Aquitaine. His name, Edward of Angoulême, is a territorial designation referring to his birthplace; this was a common naming practice in 14th-century England. Through his father, Edward the Black Prince, he was a member of the House of Plantagenet and the second, but eldest surviving grandson (Note: Edward's eldest grandson was John (c. 1362/64–died young), the eldest son of John of Gaunt.(Weir 2008a, pp. 93–117).) of the reigning English monarch, Edward III. Edward was related to the reigning French royal House of Valois through his paternal grandmother, Philippa of Hainault. His mother, Joan, was his father's first cousin once removed, and was suo jure Countess of Kent.

Edward's date of birth has been a matter of debate. In the Dictionary of National Biography article for his father, Edward's birth year is given as 1363, 1364 or 1365, based on three contemporary chronicles, including that of Jean Froissart. A letter sent by Joan of Kent to Edward III on 4 February 1365 announces Edward's birth on 27 January; therefore, this is the date of birth most used. (Note: Records attest that on 14 March 1364, Charles V of France rewarded the Black Prince's squire who informed him of young Edward's birth (Moisant 1894, p. 149). Thus, a birth date of 27 January 1364/5 may be employed (Richardson 2011, p. 492).) News of his birth was "so acceptable to his royal grandfather, that the king conferred upon the messenger, John Delves, an annuity of forty pounds per annum for life."

Edward was baptized at the Château d'Angoulême, in March 1365. The Black Prince enjoyed luxury and Edward's baptism was meant to show the natives of Aquitaine that they had a sovereign in the Black Prince: present were 154 lords and 706 knights and, supposedly, 18000 horses; over £400 were spent on candles alone. Edward's baptism was also celebrated with "splendid tournaments." One of his godparents was Bishop Jean de Crois. The name the Black Prince chose for his eldest son had been borne by three English kings and had already become a popular name with political implications by the time Edward and his brother, Richard (b. 1367), were born. In Yorkist times, these were the most popular names.

=== Death ===
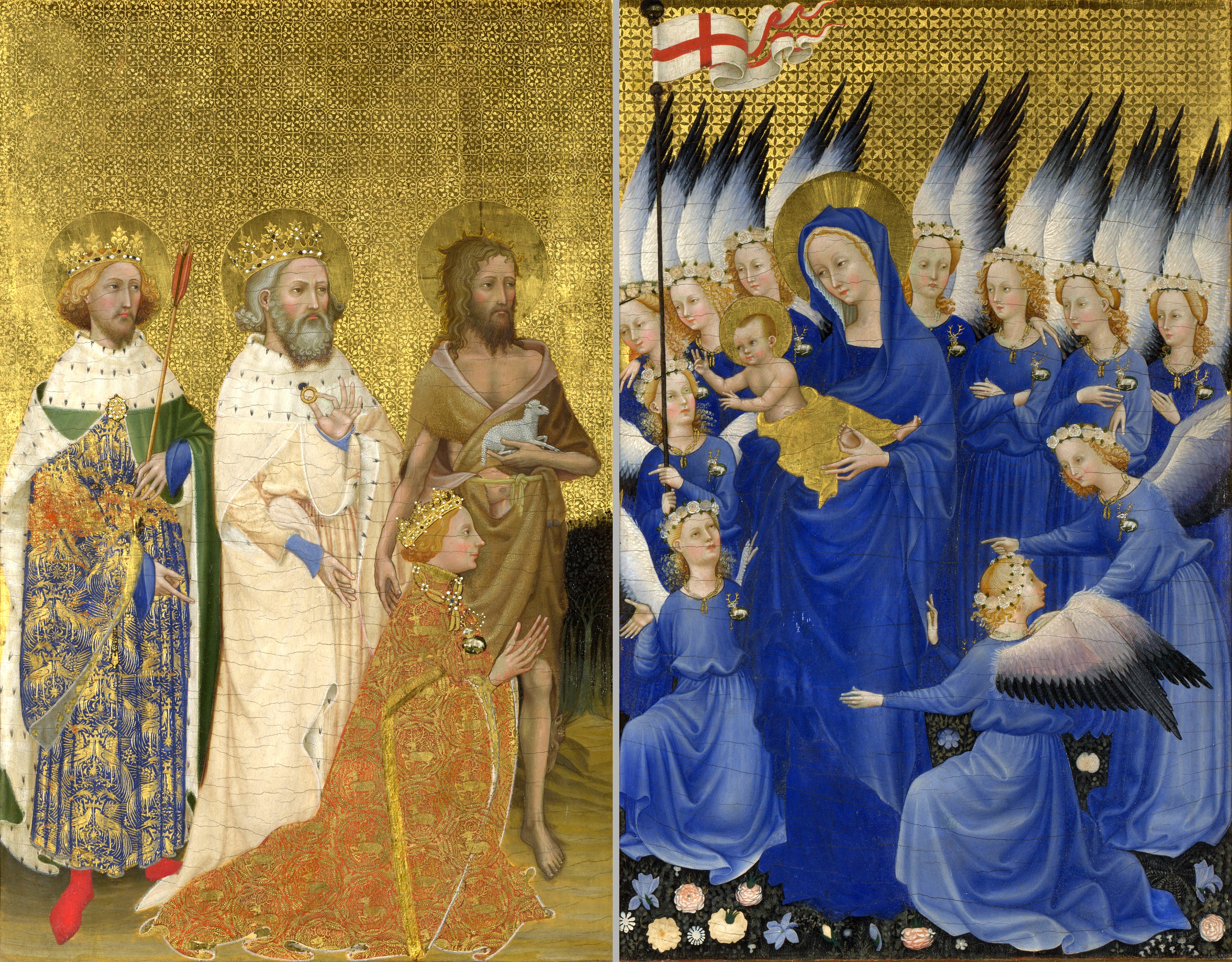
The Wilton Diptych.

After prolonged suffering, Edward died of the bubonic plague; although the exact time of his death is not known, the date of January 1371 is commonly used. The Wigmore Chronicle of 1370 states that Edward died "around the feast of Saint Michael [29 September]"; this is probably the correct date.

The Black Prince found out about Edward's death after he returned from the siege of Limoges; "he was very grieved in his heart, but none can escape death." Edward's loss "was a bitter grief to [the Black Prince and Joan of Kent]" and only increased the severity of the Black Prince's illness. Edward had "already won a reputation for a Christ-like character," and in his infancy, "historians have been willing to see the seeds of those high qualities which distinguished his father and his grandfather, which were denied to his brother Richard II." The Black Prince returned to England with Joan and Richard in 1371, and died there in 1376 of a wasting disease that had been ravaging his body for many years.

Before the Black Prince and his family left for England, he left his brother, John of Gaunt, in charge of arranging Edward's funeral, which took place in Bordeaux and was attended by all of the barons of Gascony and Poitou. Edward's body was exhumed in 1388/9 and transported back to England by Robert Waldby, Bishop of Aire, who was acting under Richard II's orders. It was at this time that Edward was buried at "Chilterne Langley," also known as Children's Langley, a priory on the estate of Kings Langley. Between 1540 and 1607, the church at Kings Langley was ruined; and Edward had already been re-buried at the Church of the Austin Friars by 1598. (Note: Antiquarian John Weever states in his book, "Antient Funeral Monuments" (first published in 1631), that Edward's grave is located at the Church of the Austin Friars in London (Weever 1767, p. 204). However, some thirty years earlier John Stow had mentioned the grave in his description of 'Broadstreete warde' in "A Survey of London" (first published in 1598) (Stow 1603, pp. 175–186).)

While Richard could not have remembered Edward well, he still "recalled [his brother] with pious affection." Thus, Edward is possibly featured on the Wilton Diptych, a small diptych which depicts Richard kneeling before the Virgin (possibly represented by Joan of Kent) and Child (possibly represented by Edward). The Diptych is held at the National Gallery of London.

=== Legacy ===
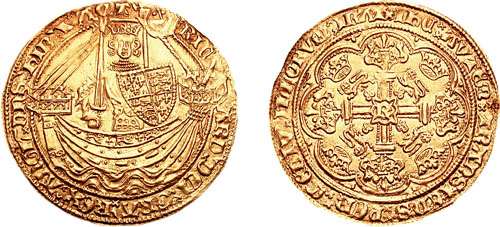
A gold noble from the reign of Richard II

Edward's early demise caused great pain to both Richard and his parents: historian Alison Weir states that, from the time the Black Prince returned to England after Edward's death, "he was a broken man." Edward's death also had a substantial impact on English history. Even during Edward's lifetime, fears that John of Gaunt would claim the throne existed; Parliament passed the Act of 1368, which permitted children born in the English domains in France to inherit the Kingdom of England, perhaps fearing that the Act of 1351, which established Edward and Richard's citizenship as English, would not be enough to ensure their succession. After Edward III's death and Richard's accession, a regency led by John of Gaunt was avoided. Nonetheless, Gaunt maintained his influential position in the years that followed, and acted as de facto regent until January 1380.

Although Richard was only ten years old when he began his reign, towards the end of the 1390s, he began what historians consider to be a period of "tyranny". By the time of Edward's death, England was in the midst of fighting during the Hundred Years' War, which had been started by Edward III. Richard made efforts to end the war, but was unsuccessful due to opposition from his magnates and the French refusing to formally acknowledge their territorial losses by transferring land to the English. In 1399, Richard was imprisoned in the Tower of London and abdicated in favour of his cousin, the Earl of Derby. With Richard's death on 14 February 1400, the direct line of the House of Plantagenet was brought to an end.

== Ancestry ==
Ancestors of Edward of Angoulême

8. Edward II of England
4. Edward III of England
9. Isabella of France
2. Edward, the Black Prince
10. William I, Count of Hainaut
5. Philippa of Hainault
11. Joan of Valois
1. Edward of Angoulême
12. Edward I of England (=16)
6. Edmund of Woodstock, 1st Earl of Kent
13. Margaret of France
3. Joan, Countess of Kent
14. John Wake, 1st Baron Wake of Liddell
7. Margaret Wake, 3rd Baroness Wake of Liddell
15. Joan de Fiennes

== Bibliography ==
- Armitage-Smith, Sydney (1905), John of Gaunt: King of Castile and Leon, Duke of Aquitaine and Lancaster, Earl of Derby, Lincoln, and Leicester, Seneschal of England, Charles Scribner's Sons
- Bennett, Michael John (1999). Richard II and the Revolution of 1399. Stroud: Sutton Publishing. ISBN 978-0-7509-2283-8.
- Chronicle Books (1993). Chronicle of the Royal Family. England: Chronicle Communications. ISBN 978-1-872031-20-0.
- Dodd, Gwilym (2000). The Reign of Richard II. Stroud: Tempus. ISBN 0-7524-1797-5.
- Finch, Barbara Clay (1883). Lives of the Princesses of Wales. Oxford: University of Oxford. OCLC 3531378.
- Fraioli, Deborah (2005). Joan of Arc and the Hundred Years War. Westport, CT: Greenwood Publishing. ISBN 978-0-313-32458-1.
- Freeman, J.W. (2001). Discovering Surnames. Oxford: Osprey Publishing. ISBN 978-0-7478-0485-7.
- Froissart, Jean (1901). Chronicles of England, France, Spain and the Adjoining Count. Co-Operative Publishing. OCLC 814412062.
- Galway, Margaret (1950). "The Wilton Diptych: A Postscript" (PDF). The Archaeological Journal. 107. Royal Archaeological Institute: 9–14. doi:10.1080/00665983.1950.10854021.
- Given-Wilson, C. (1993). "The Manner of King Richard's Renunciation: A 'Lancastrian Narrative'?". English Historical Review. 108 (427). Oxford Journals: 365–70. doi:10.1093/ehr/CVIII.427.365.
- Hamilton, J.S. (2010). The Plantagenets: History of a Dynasty. London: Continuum Publishing. ISBN 978-1-4411-5712-6.
- Haydon, F.S. (2012). Eulogium. Cambridge: Cambridge University Press. ISBN 978-1-108-04258-1.
- Hermentrude (1878). "The Tomb of Edmund of Langley, Duke of York". Notes and Queries. s5-IX (222). Oxford Journals: 251–2. doi:10.1093/nq/s5-IX.222.251b.
- Hunt, William (1889). Dictionary of National Biography, vol. 17. London: Elder Smith &Co. OCLC 1359796.
- James, George (1836). A History of the Life of Edward the Black Prince. London: Longman, Rees, Orme, Brown, Green & Longman. OCLC 1307858.
- Jones, Dan (2012). The Plantagenets: The Kings Who Made England. Harper Press. ISBN 978-0-00-745749-6.
- Levine, Mortimer (1966). The Early Elizabethan Succession Question, 1558–1568. Stanford: Stanford University Press. ISBN 978-0-8047-0299-7.
- List of Foreign Accounts (1900). Lists and Indexes. London: Public Record Office. OCLC 1751522.
- McKisack, May (1959). The Fourteenth Century: 1307–1399. Oxford: Oxford University Press. ISBN 0-19-821712-9.
- McNalty, A.S. (1955). "The illness of Edward the Black Prince". British Medical Journal. 1 (4919). BMJ Group: 411. doi:10.1136/bmj.1.4910.411. PMC 2061131. PMID 13230513.
- Marshall, Alison (2006). "The childhood and household of Edward II's half-brothers, Thomas of Brotherton and Edmund of Woodstock". In Gwilym Dodd; Anthony Musson (eds.). The Reign of Edward II: New Perspectives. Boydell & Brewer. pp. 190–204. ISBN 9781903153192.
- Moisant, Joseph (1894). Le Prince Noir en Aquitaine 1355-1356--1362-1370 (in French). Aquitaine: A. Picard et fils. OCLC 14703874.
- Mortimer, Ian (2006). The Perfect King: the Life of Edward III, Father of the English Nation. London: Jonathan Cape. ISBN 978-0-09-952709-1.
- Ormond, W. Mark (2012). Fourteenth Century England. Woodbridge: Boydell Press. ISBN 978-1-84383-721-3.
- Page, William (1912). A History of the County of Hertford, vol. 3. London. OCLC 59629088.
- Phillips, Seymour (2010). Edward II. New Haven: Yale University Press. ISBN 978-0-300-15657-7.
- Prestwich, Michael (1988). Edward I. California: University of California Press. ISBN 978-0-520-06266-5.
- Redlich, Marcellus Donald R. von (2009) [1941], Pedigrees of Some of the Emperor Charlemagne's Descendants, vol. I (1st, reprint, ebook ed.), Genealogical Publishing Company, p. 64, ISBN 978-0-8063-0494-6
- Richardson, Douglas (2011). Magna Carta Ancestry: A Study in Colonial and Medieval Families. Utah: Douglas Richardson. ISBN 978-1-4610-4520-5.
- Saul, Nigel (1997). Richard II. New Haven: Yale University Press. ISBN 0-300-07003-9.
- Saul, Nigel (2005). The Three Richards: Richard I, Richard II and Richard III. London: Hambledon. ISBN 1-85285-286-0.
- Stow, John (1603). A Survey of London. Oxford: Clarendon Press. OCLC 2106727.
- Taylor, John (1987). English Historical Literature in the Fourteenth Century. Oxford: Clarendon Press. OCLC 14719303.
- Wagner, John (2006). Encyclopedia of the Hundred Years War. Westport: Greenwood Publishing. ISBN 978-0-313-32736-0.
- Watson, G. W. (1895). "The Seize Quartiers of the Kings and Queens of England". In H.W. Forsyth Harwood (ed.). The Genealogist. New Series. Vol. 11. Exeter: William Pollard & Co. p. 79.
- Weever, John (1767). Ancient Funeral Monuments, of Great-Britain, Ireland, and the Islands Adjacent. England: W. Tooke. OCLC 3021467.
- Weir, Alison (2008a). Britain's Royal Families: The Complete Genealogy. New York: Vintage Books. ISBN 978-0-09-953973-5.
- Weir, Alison (2008b). Katherine Swynford. New York: Vintage Books. ISBN 978-0-7126-4197-5.
