= Roger Clarendon =

English royal bastard and conspirator (1350–1402)

Arms of Sir Roger de Clarendon

Sir Roger Clarendon (Note: (French pronunciation: [ʁɔʒe klaʁəndɔn])) (c. 1350 – 8 June 1402) was a conspirator and royal bastard as the illegitimate son of Edward the Black Prince and his mistress, Edith Willesford.

== Biography ==
Clarendon was the illegitimate son of Edward the Black Prince, and his mistress, Edith Willesford. He was a paternal half-brother to Richard II of England. Being regarded as a possible pretender, Clarendon was hanged and beheaded by order of Henry IV of England in 1402. His execution was made the subject of one of the articles exhibited by Richard Scrope, Archbishop of York, against Henry IV during a rebellion in 1405.

== Sources ==
- Given-Wilson, C. (2004). "Clarendon, Sir Roger (c.1350–1402)". Oxford Dictionary of National Biography (online ed.). Oxford University Press. doi:10.1093/ref:odnb/5452. (Subscription, Wikipedia Library access or UK public library membership required.)
- Rigg, James McMullen (1887). "Clarendon, Roger" . In Stephen, Leslie (ed.). Dictionary of National Biography. Vol. 10. London: Smith, Elder & Co. p. 398. Endnotes:
  - Walsingham's Hist. Angl. (Rolls Ser.), ii. 249;
  - Trokelowe et Anon. Chron. (Rolls Ser.), 340;
  - Eulog. Hist. iii. 389
  - Stubbs's Const. Hist. iii. 36, 49
