= Arruiz =

Coordinates: 42°59′39.65″N 1°51′47.24″W

Arruitz is a town and a local council area in the municipality of Larraun within the Autonomous Community of Navarra, northern Spain.
