= House of Plantagenet =

Angevin royal dynasty that ruled England in the Middle Ages

- Royal house
- Gules three lions passant guardant in pale or

- The planta genista symbol (badge) of the Plantagenets
- Parent house: House of Ingelger (Cognatic); House of Châteaudun (Agnatic)
- Country: Kingdom of England; Kingdom of France; Lordship of Ireland; Principality of Wales; Holy Roman Empire (titular)
- Founded: 12th century
- Founder: Geoffrey V of Anjou
- Current head: Henry Somerset, 12th Duke of Beaufort (Beaufort branch)
- Final ruler: Richard III of England
- Titles: See list: (Kingdom of England) King of England; (Kingdom of France) King of France (claim); (Holy Roman Empire) King of the Romans (titular); (Kingdom of the Two Sicilies) King of Sicily (claim); (Castile (historical region)) King of Castile (claim); (Lordship of Ireland) Lord of Ireland; Lord of Cyprus; Prince of Wales; Duke of Aquitaine; Duke of Normandy; Duke of Brittany; Duke of Gascony; Duke of Cornwall; (Gloucestershire) Duke of Gloucester; Duke of Clarence; Duke of Aumale; (Duchy of Anjou) Count of Anjou; Count of Maine; (Manche) Count of Mortain; Count of Nantes; Count of Poitou; (Buckinghamshire) Earl of Buckingham; Earl of Cornwall; Earl of Chester; Earl of Essex; Earl of Ulster; Earl of Norfolk; Earl of Kent; Earl of Lancaster; Earl of Leicester; Earl of Salisbury; Earl of Richmond
- Dissolution: 1430 (Lancaster, female); 1471 (Lancaster, male); 1499 (York, male-legitimate); 1541 (York, female)
- Deposition: 1485
- Cadet branches: House of Lancaster; House of York; House of Beaufort (legitimised)

The House of Plantagenet (Note: Pronounced /plænˈtædʒɪnɪt/ plan-TAJ-in-it. The Plantagenet name is spelt in English sources in several ways, such as Plantaganet, Plantagenett, Plantagenette, Plantaginet, Plantagynett.) was a royal house which originated in the French county of Anjou. The family held the English throne from 1154, with the accession of Henry II, until 1485, when Richard III died in battle. The first three Plantagenet kings of England ruled extensive territories in France and are sometimes called the Angevins to distinguish them from their successors (although the term Angevin is sometimes used to refer to the entire dynasty). After the deposing of Richard II in 1399, two cadet branches of the Plantagenets ruled England: the houses of Lancaster and York.

England was transformed under the Plantagenets, although only partly intentionally. The Plantagenet kings were often forced to negotiate compromises such as Magna Carta, which constrained royal power in return for financial and military support. The king was no longer just the most powerful man in the nation, holding the prerogative of judgement, feudal tribute and warfare, but had defined duties to the realm, underpinned by a sophisticated justice system. By the end of the reign of Edward III (r. 1327–1377), the Plantagenets developed a new identity, including adopting the language of the ordinary people, Middle English, as the language of governance. This is one of the reasons that the Oxford Dictionary of National Biography considers Edward III as culturally the first English Plantagenet ruler.

In the 15th century, the Plantagenets were defeated in the Hundred Years' War and beset with social, political and economic problems. Popular revolts were commonplace, triggered by the denial of numerous freedoms. English nobles raised private armies, engaged in private feuds and openly defied Henry VI. The rivalry between the House of Plantagenet's two cadet branches of York and Lancaster brought about the Wars of the Roses, a decades-long fight for the English succession. It culminated in the Battle of Bosworth Field in 1485, when the death of King Richard III ended both the reign of the Plantagenets and the English Middle Ages. Henry VII, a Lancastrian through the maternal line, became king of England; five months later he married Elizabeth of York, thus ending the Wars of the Roses and giving rise to the Tudor dynasty. The Tudors worked to centralise English royal power, which allowed them to avoid some of the problems that had plagued the last Plantagenet rulers. The resulting stability made possible the English Renaissance and the advent of early modern Britain. Every monarch of England, and later the United Kingdom, from Henry VII to the present is a descendant of the Plantagenets.

== Terminology ==
=== Plantagenet ===
In the 15th century, near the end of the dynastic line, Richard of York, 3rd Duke of York, adopted Plantagenet as his family name. Plantegenest (or Plante Genest) had been a 12th-century nickname for his ancestor Geoffrey, Count of Anjou and Duke of Normandy. One of many popular theories suggests the blossom of the common broom, a bright yellow ("gold") flowering plant, called genista in medieval Latin, as the source of the nickname.

It is uncertain why Richard of York chose this specific name, although during the Wars of the Roses (1455–1487) it emphasised Richard's status as Geoffrey's patrilineal descendant. The retrospective usage of the name for all of Geoffrey's male-line descendants was popular during the subsequent Tudor dynasty, perhaps encouraged by the further legitimacy it gave to Richard's great-grandson, Henry VIII. It was only in the late 17th century that it passed into common usage among historians.

=== Angevins ===
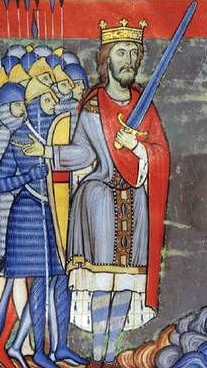
Henry II (1154–1189) is considered by some to be the first Plantagenet king of England, and the first Angevin.

Angevin is French for "of Anjou" and can refer to inhabitants of that region or any of a number of royal houses that descended from the counts or dukes of Anjou. In the 12th century, angevin also referred to the currency used in the continental territories of the king of England, equivalent to English sterling. The term is used by some historians to refer to the first three kings of England from the Plantagenet dynasty: Henry II (r. 1154–1189), son of Geoffrey of Anjou, and his two sons Richard I (r. 1189–1199) and John (r. 1199–1216). Sometimes, however, Angevin is used to refer to the entire Plantagenet royal house. John lost Anjou and most of his other French territories, making England, rather than France, the center of gravity of the realm.

The term "Angevin Empire" was coined by Kate Norgate in 1887. There was no known contemporary collective name for all of the territories under the rule of the Angevin kings of England. This led to circumlocutions such as "our kingdom and everything subject to our rule whatever it may be" or "the whole of the kingdom which had belonged to his father". The "Empire" portion of "Angevin Empire" has been controversial, especially as these territories were not subject to any unified laws or systems of governance, and each retained its own laws, traditions, and feudal relationships. In 1986, a convention of historians concluded that there had not been an Angevin state, and therefore no "Angevin Empire", but that the term espace Plantagenet (French for "Plantagenet area") was acceptable. Nonetheless, historians have continued to use "Angevin Empire".

== Origin ==
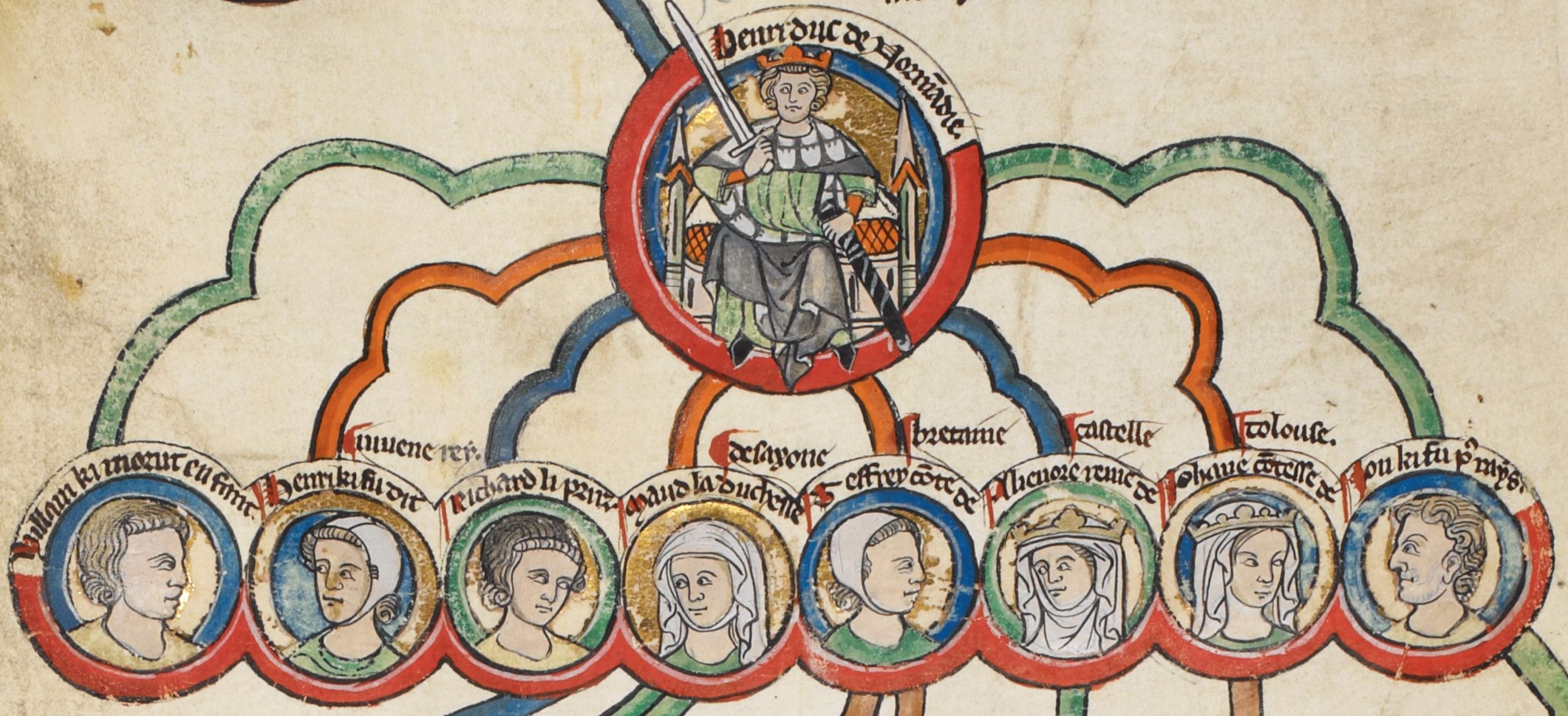
A 13th-century depiction of Henry II and his legitimate children: William, Henry, Richard, Matilda, Geoffrey, Eleanor, Joan and John

The later counts of Anjou, including the Plantagenets, descended from Geoffrey II, Count of Gâtinais, and his wife Ermengarde of Anjou. In 1060, the couple inherited the title via cognatic kinship from an Angevin family that was descended from a noble named Ingelger, whose recorded history dates from 870.

During the 10th and 11th centuries, power struggles occurred between rulers in northern and western France, including those of Anjou, Normandy, Brittany, Poitou, Blois and Maine, and the kings of France. In the early 12th century, Geoffrey of Anjou married Empress Matilda, King Henry I's only surviving legitimate child and heir to the English throne from the House of Normandy. As a result of this marriage, Geoffrey's son Henry II inherited the English throne as well as Norman and Angevin titles, thus marking the beginning of the Angevin and Plantagenet dynasties.

The marriage was the third attempt of Geoffrey's father, Fulk V, Count of Anjou, to build a political alliance with Normandy. He first espoused his daughter, Matilda, to William Adelin, Henry I's heir. After William drowned in the wreck of the White Ship, Fulk married another of his daughters, Sibylla, to William Clito, son of Henry I's older brother, Robert Curthose. Henry I had the marriage annulled to avoid strengthening William's rival claim to Normandy. Finally Fulk achieved his goal through the marriage of Geoffrey and Matilda. Fulk then passed his titles to Geoffrey and became King of Jerusalem.

== Angevin kings ==
=== Arrival in England ===
Henry II's continental holdings in 1154 (in various shades of red), forming part of the "Angevin Empire"

When Henry II was born in 1133, his maternal grandfather, Henry I, was reportedly delighted, saying that the boy was "the heir to the kingdom". The birth reduced the risk that the King's realm would pass to his son-in-law's family, which was possible if the marriage of Matilda and Geoffrey ended childless. The birth of a second son, also named Geoffrey, increased the likelihood of partible inheritance following French custom, in which Henry would receive the English maternal inheritance and Geoffrey the Angevin paternal inheritance. This would separate the realms of England and Anjou.

In order to secure an orderly succession, Geoffrey and Matilda sought more power from Henry I, but quarrelled with him after the King refused to give them power that might be used against him. When he died in December 1135, the couple were in Anjou, allowing Matilda's cousin Stephen to seize the crown of England. Stephen's contested accession initiated the widespread civil unrest later called the Anarchy.

Count Geoffrey had little interest in England. Instead he commenced a ten-year war for the duchy of Normandy, but it became clear that to bring this conflict to a successful conclusion, Stephen would need to be challenged in England. In 1139, Matilda and her half-brother, Robert, invaded England. From the age of nine, Henry was repeatedly sent to England to be the male figurehead of the campaigns, since it became apparent that he would become King, if England were conquered. In 1141, Stephen was captured at the Battle of Lincoln and later exchanged for Robert, who had also been captured. Geoffrey continued the conquest of Normandy and, in 1150, transferred the duchy to Henry while retaining the primary role in the duchy's government.

Three events allowed the Angevins' successful termination of the conflict:

- Count Geoffrey died in 1151 before finalising the division of his realm between Henry and Henry's younger brother Geoffrey, who would have inherited Anjou. According to William of Newburgh, who wrote in the 1190s, Count Geoffrey decided that Henry would receive England and Anjou for as long as he needed the resources for the conflict against Stephen. Count Geoffrey instructed that his body should not be buried until Henry swore an oath that the young Geoffrey would receive Anjou when England and Normandy were secured. W. L. Warren cast doubt on this account on the grounds that it was written later, based on a single contemporary source, it would be questionable that either Geoffrey or Henry would consider such an oath binding and it would break the inheritance practice of the time. The young Geoffrey died in 1158, before receiving Anjou, but he had become count of Nantes when the citizens of Nantes rebelled against their ruler. Henry had supported the rebellion.
- Louis VII of France was granted an annulment of his marriage to Eleanor of Aquitaine on 18 March 1152, and she married Henry (who would become Henry II) on 18 May 1152. Consequently, the Angevins acquired the Duchy of Aquitaine.
- Stephen's wife, Matilda of Boulogne, and elder son, Eustace, both died in 1153, leading to the Treaty of Wallingford. The treaty agreed to the peace offer that Empress Matilda had rejected in 1142, recognised Henry as Stephen's heir, guaranteed Stephen's second son William his father's estates and allowed Stephen to be king for life. Stephen died soon afterwards, and Henry acceded to the throne in late 1154.

=== Angevin zenith ===
Of Henry's siblings, William and Geoffrey died unmarried and childless, but the tempestuous marriage of Henry and Eleanor, who already had two daughters (Marie and Alix) through her first marriage to King Louis, produced eight children in thirteen years:

- Henry the Young King (1155–1183)
- Matilda, Duchess of Saxony (1156–1189) — married Henry the Lion, Duke of Bavaria. The eldest amongst the couple's children, Richenza, is probably the daughter English chroniclers call Matilda, who was left in Normandy with her grandparents in 1185 and married firstly to Geoffrey, count of Perche, and secondly to Enguerrand de Coucy. The eldest son, Henry, became duke of Saxony and count palatine of the Rhine. His brother Otto was nominated by his uncle Richard I as earl of York and count of Poitiers before being elected emperor in opposition to the Hohenstaufen candidate. Otto was crowned in Rome but he was later excommunicated and declared deposed. Childless, Otto lost power following the defeat of the Welf and Angevin forces at the Battle of Bouvines. The youngest child, William of Winchester, married Princess Helena of Denmark. Their only son, also called Otto, was the sole male heir of his uncle Henry. The ducal house of Brunswick-Lüneburg and the British royal house of Windsor both descend from him.
- Richard I, King of England (1157–1199). He had no legitimate offspring, but is thought to have had two illegitimate sons, of whom little is known, called Fulk and Philip, Lord of Cognac.
- Geoffrey II, Duke of Brittany (1158–1186) – married Constance, daughter of Duke Conan IV of Brittany and became duke of Brittany by right of his wife. The couple's son, Arthur I, Duke of Brittany, was a competitor to his uncle John for the Angevin succession and disappeared mysteriously as an adolescent in 1203.
- Eleanor, Queen of Castile (1161–1214) – married King Alfonso VIII of Castile. The couple's children included King Henry I of Castile and four queens consort, Berengaria of Leon, Urraca of Portugal, Blanche of France and Eleanor of Aragon.
- Joan, Queen of Sicily (1165–1199) – married firstly King William II of Sicily and secondly Count Raymond VI of Toulouse. Her children included Raymond VII of Toulouse.
- John, King of England (1166–1216)

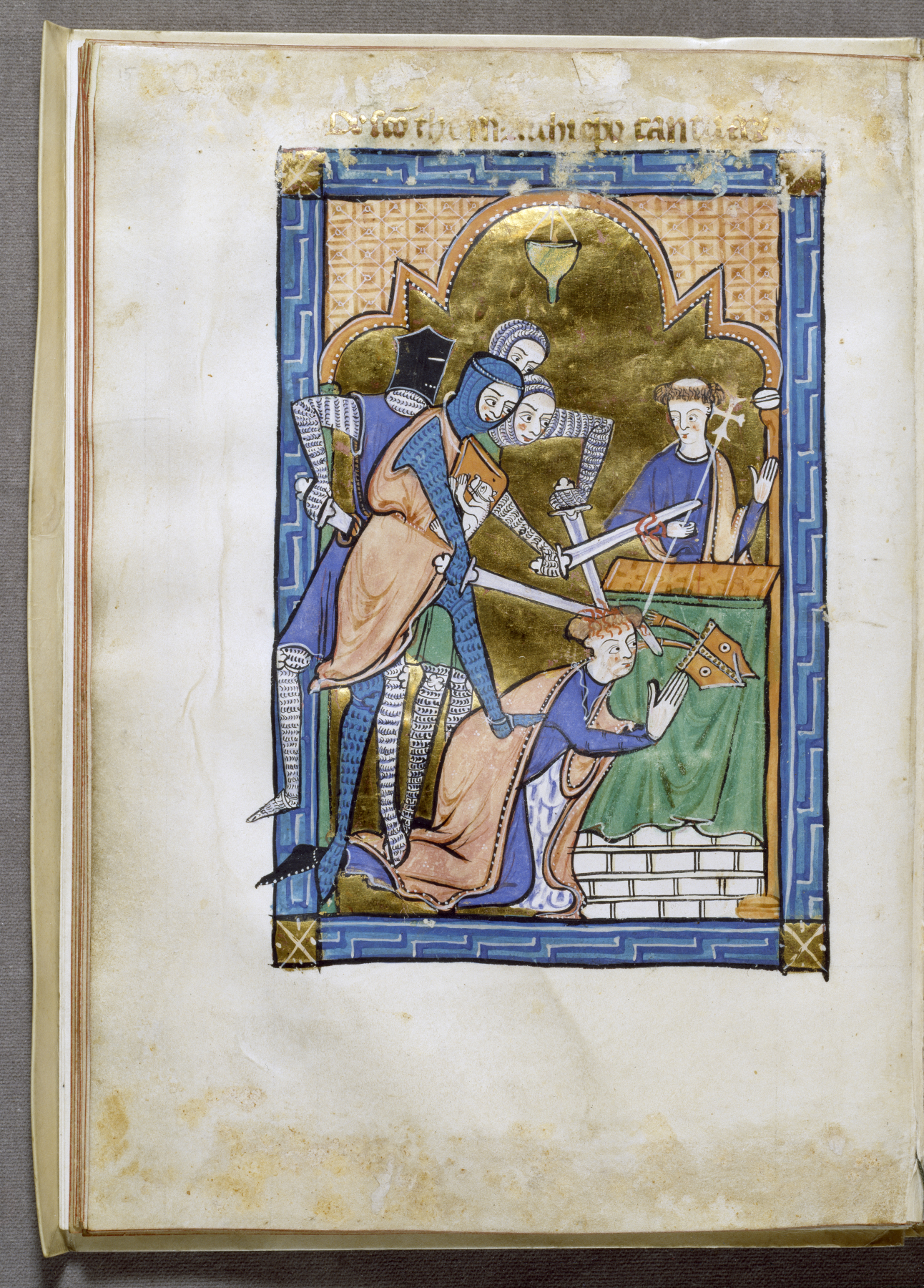
A miniature from an English psalter presenting a spirited account of the murder of Archbishop Thomas Becket, c. 1250. Walters Art Museum, Baltimore

Henry also had illegitimate children with several mistresses, possibly as many as twelve. These children included Geoffrey, William, Peter and four children who died young by Alys, the daughter of Louis VII, while she was betrothed to his son Richard. William's many competencies and importance as a royal bastard led to a long and illustrious career.

Henry reasserted and extended previous suzerainties to secure possession of his inherited realm. In 1162, he attempted to re-establish what he saw as his authority over the English Church by appointing his friend Thomas Becket as Archbishop of Canterbury upon the death of the incumbent archbishop, Theobald. Becket's defiance as Archbishop alienated the king and his counsellors. Henry and Becket had repeated disputes over issues such as church tenures, the marriage of Henry's brother, and taxation.

Henry reacted by getting Becket and other English bishops to recognise sixteen ancient customs in writing for the first time in the Constitutions of Clarendon, governing relations between the king, his courts and the church. When Becket tried to leave the country without permission, Henry tried to ruin him by filing legal cases relating to Becket's previous tenure as chancellor. Becket fled and remained in exile for five years. Relations later improved, and Becket returned, but they declined again when Henry's son was crowned as coregent by the Archbishop of York, which Becket perceived as a challenge to his authority.

Becket later excommunicated those who had offended him. When he received this news, Henry said: "What miserable drones and traitors have I nurtured and promoted in my household who let their lord be treated with such shameful contempt by a low-born clerk." Four of Henry's knights killed Becket in Canterbury Cathedral after Becket resisted a failed arrest attempt. Henry was widely considered complicit in Becket's death throughout Christian Europe. This made Henry a pariah; in penance, he walked barefoot into Canterbury Cathedral, where he was severely whipped by monks.

From 1155, Henry claimed that Pope Adrian IV had given him authorisation to reform the Irish church by assuming control of Ireland, but Professor Anne Duggan's research indicates that the Laudabiliter is a falsification of an existing letter and that was not in fact Adrian's intention. It originally allowed Henry's brother William some territory. Henry did not personally act on this until 1171, by which time William was already dead. He invaded Ireland to assert his authority over knights who had accrued autonomous power after they recruited soldiers in England and Wales and colonised Ireland with his permission. Henry later gave Ireland to his youngest son, John.

In 1172, Henry gave John the castles of Chinon, Loudun and Mirebeau as a wedding gift. This angered Henry's eighteen-year-old son, Henry the Young King, who believed that those were his. A rebellion by Henry II's wife and three eldest sons ensued. Louis VII of France supported the rebellion. William the Lion, king of the Scots, and others joined the revolt. After eighteen months, Henry subdued the rebels.

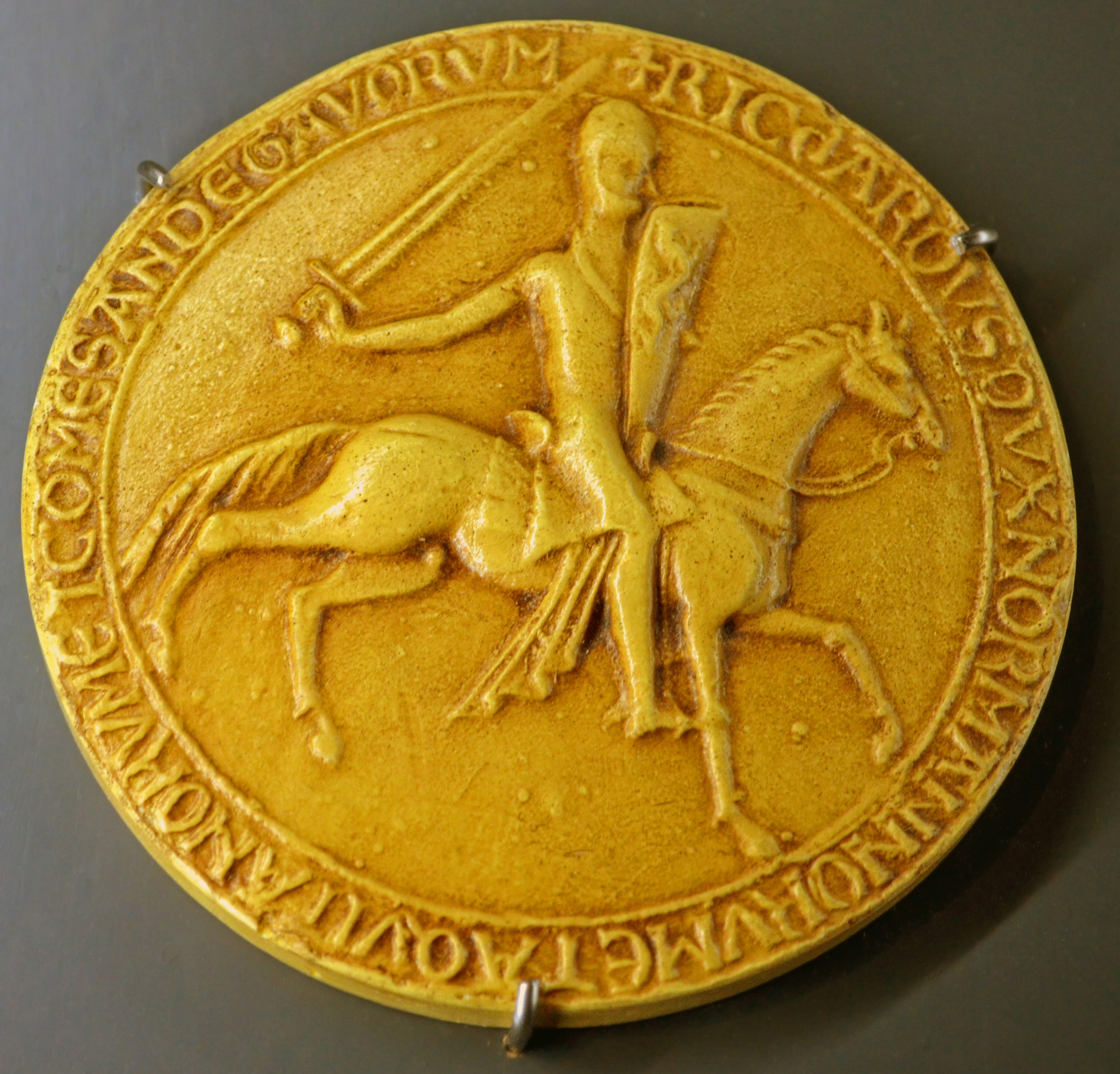
Richard I's Great Seal of 1189, the History Museum of Vendée

In Le Mans in 1182, Henry II gathered his children to plan a partible inheritance: his eldest surviving son, Henry, would inherit England, Normandy and Anjou; Richard (his mother's favourite) would inherit the Duchy of Aquitaine; Geoffrey would inherit Brittany; and John would inherit Ireland. This resulted in further conflict. The younger Henry rebelled again, but died of dysentery. Geoffrey died in 1186 after an accident in a tournament. In 1189, Richard and Philip II of France reasserted their various claims, exploiting the ageing Henry's failing health. Henry was forced to accept humiliating peace terms, including naming Richard his sole heir. The old King died two days later, defeated and miserable. French and English contemporary moralists viewed this fate as retribution for the murder of Becket; even his favourite legitimate son, John, had rebelled although the constantly loyal illegitimate son Geoffrey remained with Henry until the end.

Following Richard's coronation, he quickly put the kingdom's affairs in order and departed on a Crusade for the Middle East. Opinion of Richard has fluctuated. He was respected for his military leadership and courtly manners. He rejected and humiliated the sister of the king of France. He deposed the king of Cyprus and later sold the island. On the Third Crusade, he made an enemy of Leopold V, Duke of Austria, by showing disrespect to his banners as well as refusing to share the spoils of war. He was rumoured to have arranged the assassination of Conrad of Montferrat. His ruthlessness was demonstrated by his massacre of 2,600 prisoners in Acre. He obtained victories during the Third Crusade, but failed to capture Jerusalem. According to Steven Runciman Richard was "a bad son, a bad husband and a bad king". Jonathan Riley-Smith described him as "vain ... devious and self-centred". In an alternate view John Gillingham points out that for centuries Richard was considered a model king.

Returning from the crusade with a small band of followers, Richard was captured by Leopold and was passed to Emperor Henry VI. Henry held Richard captive for eighteen months (1192–1194) while his mother raised the ransom, valued at 100,000 marks. In Richard's absence, Philip II overran large portions of Normandy and John acquired control of Richard's English lands. After returning to England, Richard forgave John and re-established his authority in England. He left again in 1194 and battled Philip for five years, attempting to regain the lands seized during his captivity. When close to complete victory, he was injured by an arrow during a siege and died ten days later.

=== Decline and the loss of Anjou ===
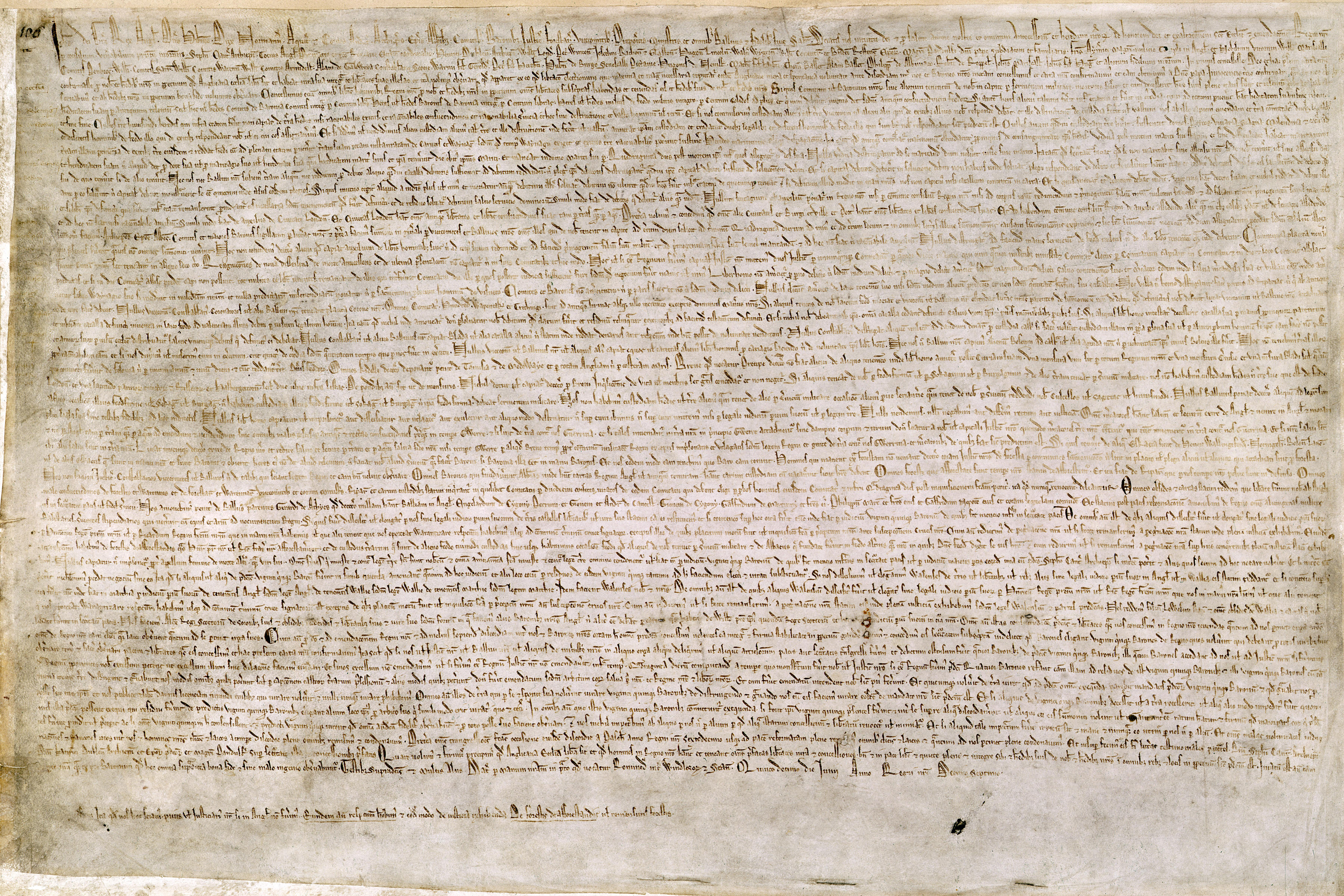
One of only four surviving exemplifications of the 1215 text of Magna Carta, in the British Library, London.

Richard's failure to provide an heir caused a succession crisis and conflict between supporters of the claim of his nephew, Arthur, and John. Guillaume des Roches led the magnates of Anjou, Maine, and Touraine declaring for Arthur. Once again Philip II of France attempted to disturb the Plantagenet territories on the European mainland by supporting his vassal Arthur's claim to the English crown. John won a significant victory while preventing Arthur's forces from capturing his mother, seizing the entire rebel leadership at the Battle of Mirebeau and his sister Eleanor, Fair Maid of Brittany.

John disregarded his allies' opinions on the fate of the prisoners, many of them their neighbours and kinsmen. Instead "he kept his prisoners so vilely and in such evil distress that it seemed shameful and ugly to all those who were with him and who saw this cruelty," according to the Histoire de Guillaume le Maréchal. As a result of John's behaviour the powerful Thouars, Lusignan, and des Roches families rebelled and John lost control of Anjou, Maine, Touraine, and northern Poitou. His son, King Henry III, maintained the claim to the Angevin territories until December 1259 when he formally surrendered them and in return was granted Gascony as duke of Aquitaine and a vassal of the king of France.

John's reputation was further damaged by the rumour, described in the Margam annals, that while drunk he himself had murdered Arthur, and if not true it is almost certain John ordered the killing. There are two contrasting schools of thought explaining the sudden collapse of John's position. Sir James Holt suggests this was the inevitable result of superior French resources. John Gillingham identifies diplomatic and military mismanagement and points out that Richard managed to hold the Angevin territory with comparable finances. Nick Barratt has calculated that Angevin resources available for use in the war were 22 per cent less than those of Philip, putting the Angevins at a disadvantage.

By 1214, John had re-established his authority in England and planned what Gillingham has called a grand strategy to recapture Normandy and Anjou. The plan was that John would draw the French from Paris, while another army, under his nephew Otto IV, the Holy Roman Emperor, and his half-brother William attacked from the north. He also brought his niece Eleanor of Brittany, aiming to establish her as Duchess of Brittany. The plan failed when John's allies were defeated at the Battle of Bouvines. Otto retreated and was soon overthrown, William was captured by the French and John agreed to a five-year truce.

From then on John also gave up the claim to Brittany of Eleanor and had her confined for life. John's defeat weakened his authority in England, and his barons forced him to agree to Magna Carta in 1215, which limited royal power. Both sides failed to abide by the terms of Magna Carta, leading to the First Barons' War, in which rebellious barons invited Prince Louis, the husband of Blanche, Henry II's granddaughter, to invade England. Louis did so but in October 1216, before the conflict was conclusively ended, John died.

== Main line ==
=== Baronial conflict and the establishment of Parliament ===
All subsequent English monarchs were descendants of the Angevin line via John, who had five legitimate children with Isabella:

- Henry III – King of England for most of the 13th-century
- Richard – King of the Romans in the Holy Roman Empire
- Joan – queen consort of Alexander II of Scotland
- Isabella – wife of the Holy Roman Emperor, Frederick II
- Eleanor – wife of William Marshal's son (also named William), and later the English rebel Simon de Montfort.

John also had illegitimate children with several mistresses. These children probably included nine sons called Richard, Oliver, Henry, Osbert Gifford, Geoffrey, John FitzJohn or Courcy, Odo or Eudes FitzRoy, Ivo, Henry, Richard the constable of Wallingford Castle and three daughters called Joan, Matilda the abbess of Barking and Isabella la Blanche. Joan was the best known of these, since she married Prince Llewelyn the Great of Wales.

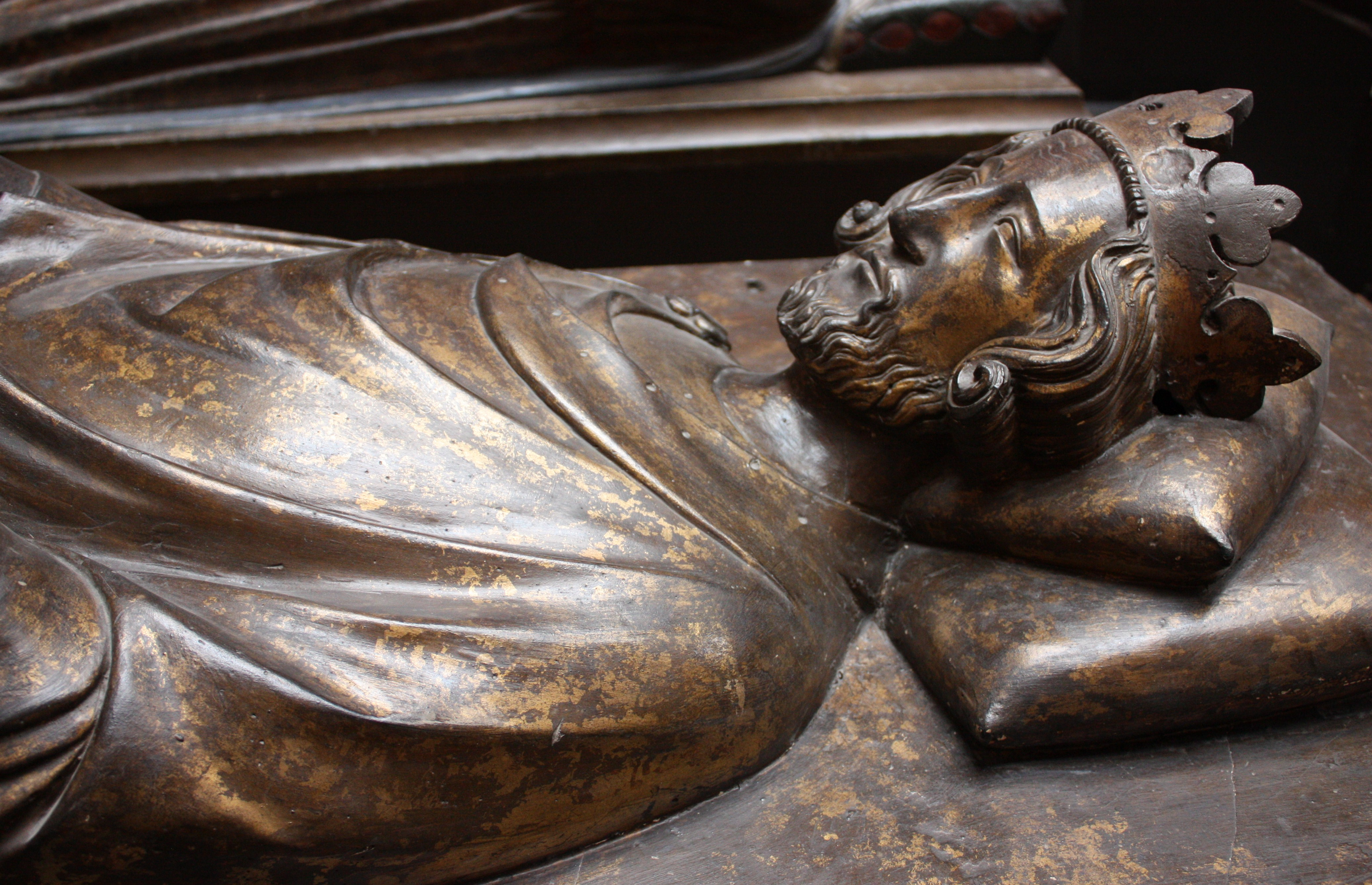
A cast of the tomb effigy of Henry III in Westminster Abbey, c. 1272

William Marshal, 1st Earl of Pembroke, was appointed regent for the nine-year-old King Henry on King John's death. Thereafter, support for Louis declined, and he renounced his claims in the Treaty of Lambeth after Marshal's victories at the battles of Lincoln and Sandwich in 1217. The Marshal regime issued an amended Magna Carta as a basis for future government. Despite the Treaty of Lambeth, hostilities continued and Henry was forced to compromise with the newly crowned Louis VIII of France and Henry's stepfather, Hugh X of Lusignan. They both overran much of Henry's remaining continental lands, further eroding the Angevins' power on the continent. In his political struggles, Henry perceived many similarities between himself and England's patron saint, Edward the Confessor. Consequently, he named his first son Edward and built the existing magnificent shrine for the Confessor.

In early 1225, a great council approved a tax of £40,000 to dispatch an army, which quickly retook Gascony. During an assembly feudal prerogatives of the king were challenged by the barons, bishops and magnates who demanded that the king reissue Magna Carta and the Charter of the Forest in exchange for support. Henry declared that the charters were issued of his own "spontaneous and free will" and confirmed them with the royal seal, giving the new Great Charter and the Charter of the Forest of 1225 much more authority than any previous versions.

Henry III had nine children:

- Edward I (1239–1307)
- Margaret of England (1240–1275). Her three children predeceased her husband, Alexander III of Scotland; consequently, the crown of Scotland became vacant on the death of their only grandchild, Margaret, Maid of Norway in 1290.
- Beatrice, Countess of Richmond (1242–1275). She initially married John de Montfort of Dreux, and later married John II, Duke of Brittany.
- Edmund Crouchback (1245–1296), who was granted the titles and estates of Simon de Montfort, 6th Earl of Leicester and the earldom of Leicester after Henry defeated Montfort in the Second Barons' War. Henry later granted Edmund the earldoms of Lancaster and Ferrers. From 1276, through his second wife Edmund was Count of Champagne and Brie. Later Lancastrians would attempt to use Henry IV's maternal descent from Edmund to legitimise his claim to the throne, spuriously claiming that Edmund was the eldest son of Henry III but had not become king due to deformity. Through his second marriage to Blanche, the widow of Henry I of Navarre, Edmund was at the centre of European aristocracy. Blanche's daughter, Joan, was queen regnant of Navarre and queen consort of France through her marriage to Philip IV. Edmund's son Thomas became the most powerful nobleman in England, adding to his inheritance the earldoms of Lincoln and Salisbury through his marriage to the heiress of Henry de Lacy, 3rd Earl of Lincoln.
- Four others who died as children: Richard (1247–1256), John (1250–1256), William (c. 1251/1252–1256), Katherine (c. 1252/3–1257) and Henry (no recorded dates).

Henry was bankrupted by his military expenditure and general extravagance. The pope offered Henry's brother Richard the Kingdom of Sicily, but the military cost of displacing the incumbent Emperor Frederick was prohibitive. Matthew Paris wrote that Richard stated: "You might as well say, 'I make you a present of the moon – step up to the sky and take it down'." Instead, Henry purchased the kingdom for his son Edmund, which angered many powerful barons. The barons led by Henry's brother-in-law Simon de Montfort forced him to agree to the Provisions of Oxford, under which his debts were paid in exchange for substantial reforms. In France, with the Treaty of Paris, Henry formally surrendered the territory of his Angevin ancestors to Louis IX of France, receiving in return the title duke of Aquitaine and the territory of Gascony as a vassal of the French king.

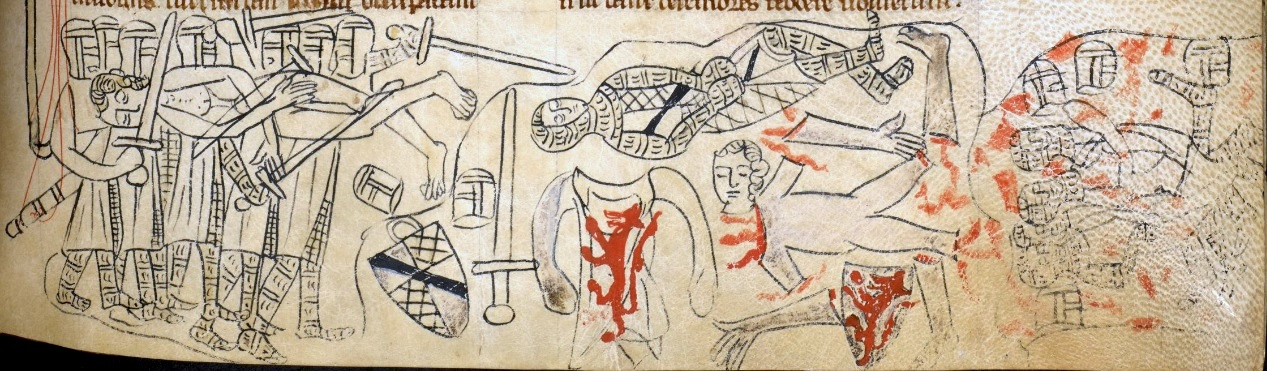
The death of Simon de Montfort at the Battle of Evesham in 1265

Disagreements between the barons and the king intensified. The barons, under Simon de Montfort, 6th Earl of Leicester, captured most of southeast England in the Second Barons' War. At the Battle of Lewes in 1264, Henry and Prince Edward were defeated and taken prisoner. De Montfort assembled the Great Parliament, recognised as the first Parliament because it was the first time the cities and boroughs had sent representatives. Edward escaped, raised an army and defeated and killed de Montfort at the Battle of Evesham in 1265.

Savage retribution was inflicted upon the rebels, and authority restored to Henry. With the realm now peaceful, Edward left England to join Louis IX on the Ninth Crusade; he was one of the last crusaders. Louis died before Edward's arrival, but Edward decided to continue. The result was disappointing; Edward's small force only enabled him to capture Acre and launch a handful of raids. After surviving an assassination attempt, Edward left for Sicily later in the year, never to participate in a crusade again. When Henry III died, Edward acceded to the throne; the barons swore allegiance to him even though he did not return for two years.

=== Constitutional change and the reform of feudalism ===
Edward I married Eleanor of Castile, daughter of King Ferdinand of Castile, a great-grandson of Henry II through his second daughter Eleanor in 1254. Edward and Eleanor had sixteen children; five daughters survived to adulthood, but only one son survived Edward:

- Eleanor, Countess of Bar (1264/69−1298)
- Three daughters (Joan, Alice, and Juliana/Katherine) and two sons (John and Henry) born between 1265 and 1271. They died between 1265 and 1274 with little historical trace.
- Joan, Countess of Gloucester (1272–1307)
- Alphonso, Earl of Chester (1273–1284)
- Margaret, Duchess of Brabant (1275–1333)
- Mary of Woodstock (1278–1332), who became a nun
- Isabella (1279–1279)
- Elizabeth, firstly Countess of Holland and on widowhood, secondly Countess of Hereford (1282–1316). Among her eleven children were the earls of Hereford, Essex, and Northampton, and the countesses of Ormond and Devon.
- Edward II
- Two other daughters (Beatrice and Blanche), who died as children.

Following Eleanor's death in 1290, Edward married Margaret of France, daughter of Philip III of France, in 1299. Edward and Margaret had two sons, who both lived to adulthood, and a daughter who died as a child:

- Thomas (1300–1338), whose daughter Margaret inherited his estates. Margaret's grandson, Thomas Mowbray, was the first duke of Norfolk, but Richard II exiled him and stripped him of his titles.
- Edmund, Earl of Kent (1301 to 1330). Edmund's loyalty to his half-brother, Edward II, resulted in his execution by order of the rebel Mortimer and his lover, Edward's queen, Isabella. His daughter, Joan, inherited his estates and married her own cousin, Edward the Black Prince; together, they had Richard, who later became the English king.
- Eleanor (1306–1311).

Evidence for Edward's involvement in legal reform is hard to find but his reign saw a major programme of legal change. Much of the drive and determination is likely to have come from the king and his experience of the baronial reform movement of the late 1250s and early 1260s. With the Statutes of Mortmain, Edward imposed his authority over the Church; the statutes prohibited land donation to the Church, asserted the rights of the Crown at the expense of traditional feudal privileges, promoted the uniform administration of justice, raised income and codified the legal system. His military campaigns left him in heavy debt and when Philip IV of France confiscated the Duchy of Gascony in 1294, Edward needed funds to wage war in France. When Edward summoned a precedent-setting assembly in order to raise more taxes for military finance, he included lesser landowners and merchants. The resulting parliament included barons, clergy, knights, and burgesses for the first time.

=== Expansion in Britain ===
Wales after the Treaty of Montgomery of 1267: Gwynedd, Llywelyn ap Gruffudd's principality Territories conquered by Llywelyn ap Gruffudd Territories of Llywelyn's vassals Lordships of the Marcher barons Lordships of the King of England Kingdom of England

On his accession, Edward I sought to organise his realm, enforcing his claims to primacy in the British Isles. Llywelyn ap Gruffudd claimed to rule North Wales "entirely separate from" England but Edward viewed him to be "a rebel and disturber of the peace". Edward's determination, military experience and skilful naval manoeuvres ended what was to him rebellion. The invasion was executed by one of the largest armies ever assembled by an English king, comprising Anglo-Norman cavalry and Welsh archers and laying the foundation for future victories in France. Llywelyn was driven into the mountains, later dying in battle. The Statute of Rhuddlan established England's authority over Wales, and Edward's son was proclaimed the first English Prince of Wales upon his birth. Edward spent vast sums on his two Welsh campaigns with a large portion of it spent on a network of castles.

Edward asserted that the king of Scotland owed him feudal allegiance, and intended to unite the two nations by marrying his son Edward to Margaret, the sole heir of King Alexander III. When Margaret died in 1290, competition for the Scottish crown ensued. By invitation of Scottish magnates, Edward I resolved the dispute, ruling in favour of John Balliol, who duly swore loyalty to him and became king. Edward insisted that he was Scotland's sovereign and possessed the right to hear appeals against Balliol's judgements, undermining Balliol's authority. Balliol allied with France in 1295; Edward invaded Scotland the following year, deposing and exiling Balliol.

Edward was less successful in Gascony, which was overrun by the French. With his resources depleting, Edward was forced to reconfirm the Charters, including Magna Carta, to obtain the necessary funds. In 1303 the French king restored Gascony to Edward by signing the Treaty of Paris. Meanwhile, William Wallace rose in Balliol's name and recovered most of Scotland. Wallace was defeated at the Battle of Falkirk, after which Robert the Bruce rebelled and was crowned king of Scotland. Edward died while travelling to Scotland for another campaign.

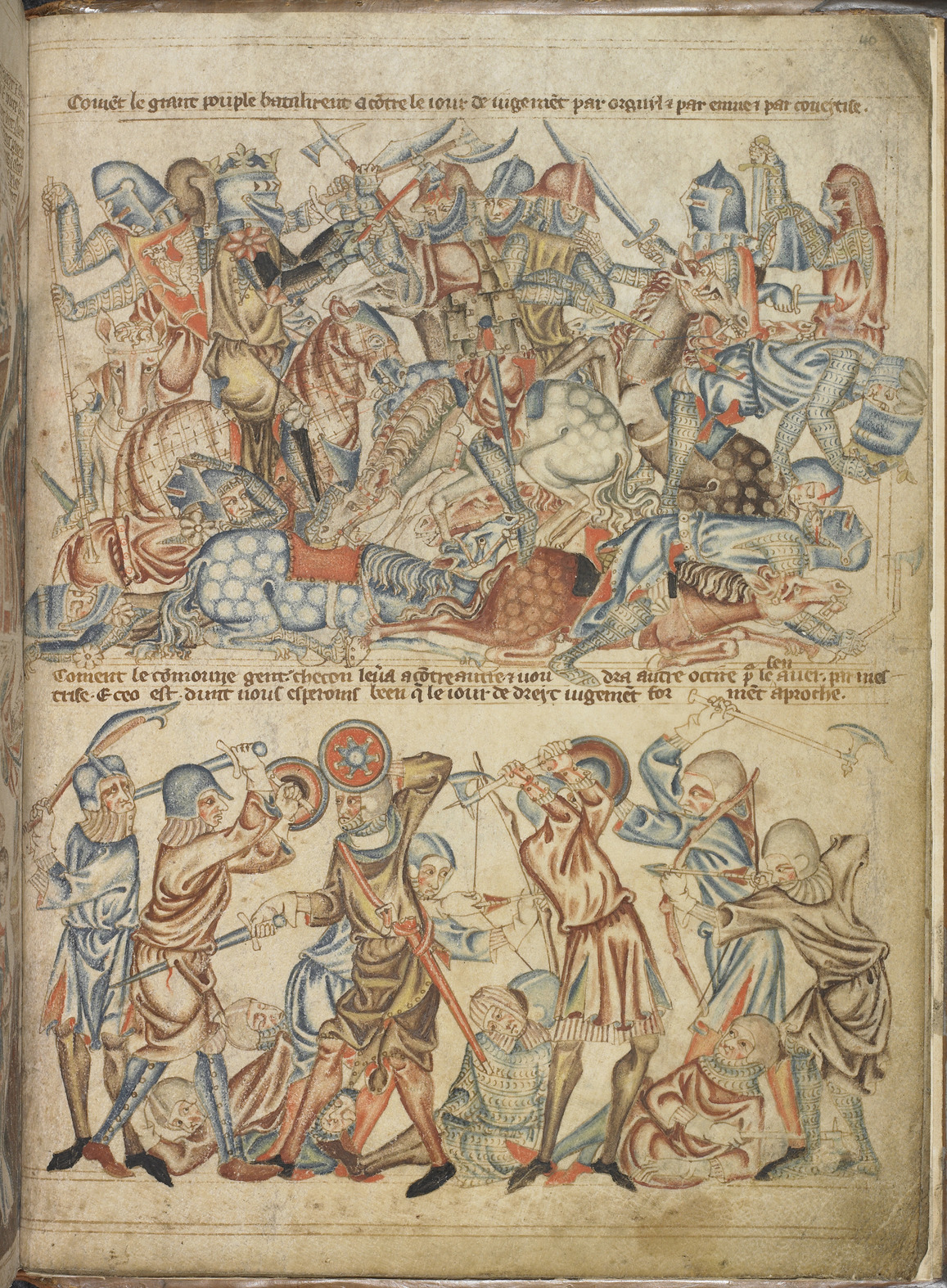
A scene from the Holkham Bible showing knights and foot soldiers at the Battle of Bannockburn in 1314.

King Edward II's coronation oath on his succession in 1307 was the first to reflect the king's responsibility to maintain the laws that the community "shall have chosen" (aura eslu in old French). He was not unpopular initially but faced three challenges: discontent over the financing of wars; his household spending; and the role of his favourite Piers Gaveston. When Parliament decided that Gaveston should be exiled the king was left with no choice but to comply. Edward engineered Gaveston's return, but was forced to agree to the appointment of Ordainers, led by his cousin Thomas, 2nd Earl of Lancaster, to reform the royal household with Piers Gaveston exiled again.

When Gaveston returned again to England, he was abducted and executed after a mock trial. The ramifications of this drove Thomas and his adherents from power. Edward's humiliating defeat by Bruce at the Battle of Bannockburn in 1314, confirming Bruce's position as an independent king of Scots, leading to Lancaster being appointed head of the king's council. Edward finally repealed the Ordinances after defeating and executing Lancaster at the Battle of Boroughbridge in 1322.

The French monarchy asserted its rights to encroach on Edward's legal rights in Gascony. Resistance to one judgement in Saint-Sardos resulted in Charles IV declaring the duchy forfeit. Charles's sister, Queen Isabella, was sent to negotiate and agreed a treaty that required Edward to pay homage in France to Charles. Edward resigned Aquitaine and Ponthieu to his son Edward, who travelled to France to give homage in his stead. With the English heir in her power, Isabella refused to return to England unless Edward II dismissed his favourites, and she became the mistress of Roger Mortimer.

The couple invaded England and, with Henry, 3rd Earl of Lancaster, captured the king. Edward II abdicated on condition that his son would inherit the throne rather than Mortimer. Although there is no historical record of the cause of death, he is popularly believed to have been murdered at Berkeley Castle by having a red-hot poker thrust into his bowels. A coup by Edward III ended four years of control by Isabella and Mortimer. Mortimer was executed. Though removed from power, Isabella was treated well, and lived in luxury for the next 27 years.

=== Conflict with the House of Valois ===
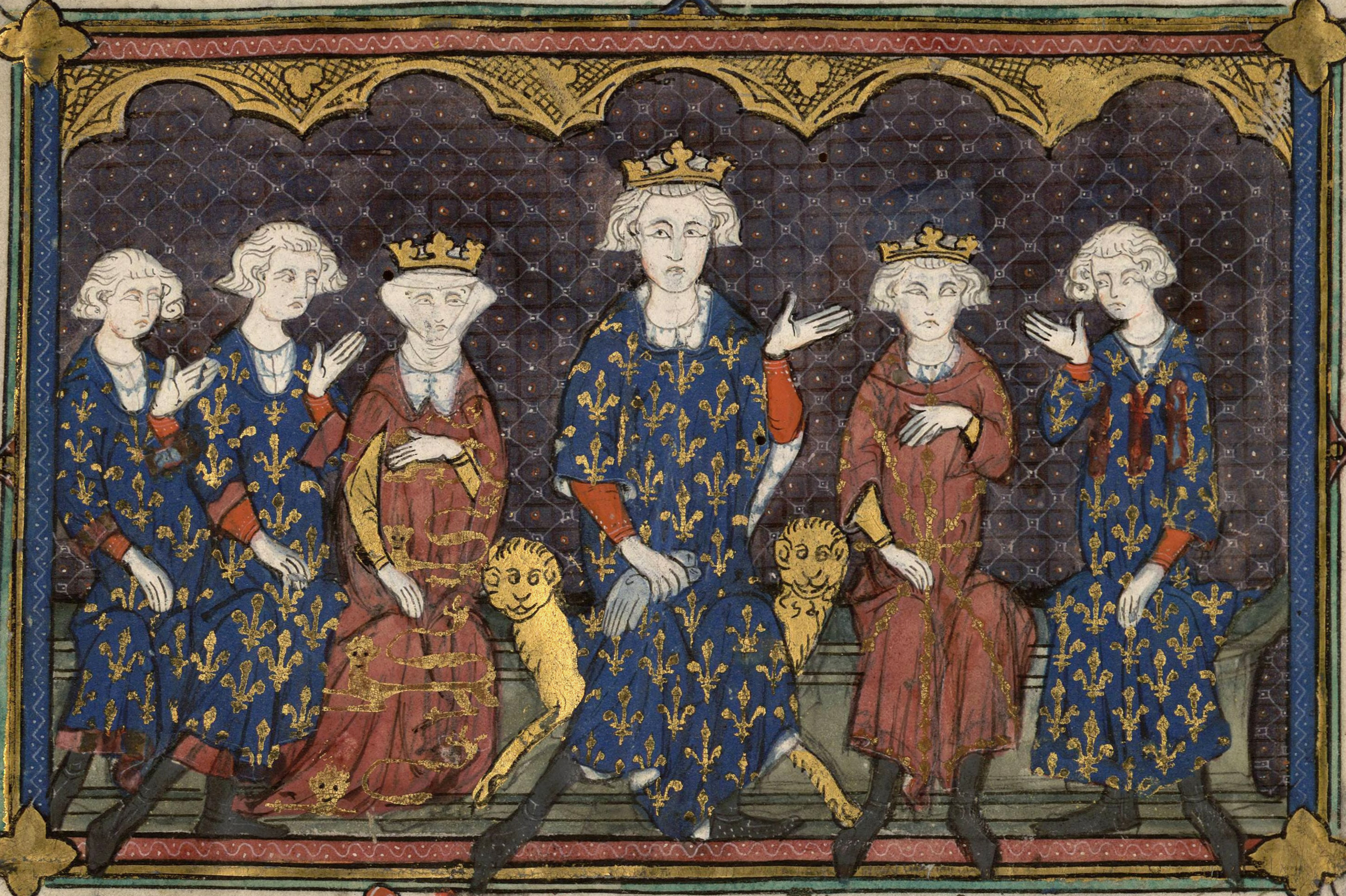
Isabella (third from left) with her father, Philip IV, her future French king brothers, and Philip's brother, Charles of Valois

In 1328, Charles IV of France died without a male heir. Queen Isabella made a claim to the throne of France on behalf of her son Edward, on the grounds that he was a matrilineal grandson of Philip IV of France. However, the precedents set by Philip V's succession over his niece Joan II of Navarre and Charles IV's succession over his nieces meant that the senior grandson of Philip III in the male line, Phillip of Valois, became king. Not yet in power, Edward paid homage to Phillip as Duke of Aquitaine.

In 1337, Phillip confiscated Aquitaine and Ponthieu from Edward, alleging he was harbouring Phillip's fugitive cousin and enemy, Robert of Artois. In response, Edward proclaimed himself king of France to encourage the Flemish to rise in open rebellion against the French king. The conflict, later known as the Hundred Years' War, included a significant English naval victory at the Battle of Sluys, and a victory on land at Crécy, leaving Edward free to capture the important port of Calais. A subsequent victory against Scotland at the Battle of Neville's Cross resulted in the capture of David II and reduced the threat from Scotland. The Black Death brought a halt to Edward's campaigns by killing perhaps a third of his subjects. The only Plantagenet known to have died from the Black Death was Edward III's daughter Joan in Bordeaux.

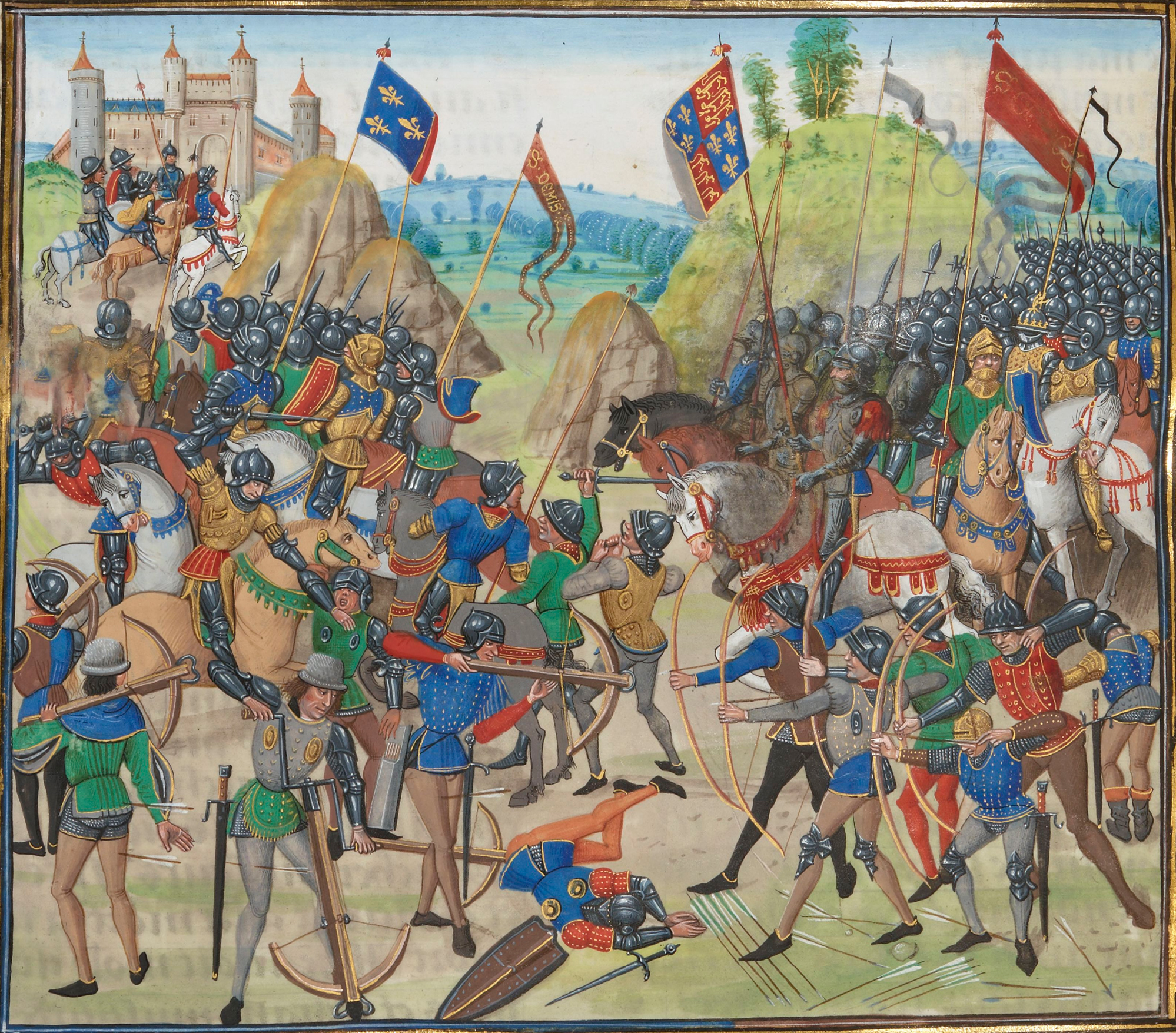
The Battle of Crécy was an important Plantagenet victory of the Hundred Years' War in France. Bibliothèque nationale de France.

Edward, the Black Prince resumed the war with destructive chevauchées starting from Bordeaux. His army was caught by a much larger French force at Poitiers, but the ensuing battle was a decisive English victory, resulting in the capture of John II of France. John agreed to a treaty promising the French would pay a four million écus ransom. The subsequent Treaty of Brétigny was demonstrably popular in England, where it was both ratified in parliament and celebrated with great ceremony.

To reach agreement, clauses were removed that would have had Edward renounce his claim to the French crown in return for territory in Aquitaine and the town of Calais. These were entered in another agreement to be effected only after the transfer of territory by November 1361, but both sides prevaricated over their commitments for the following nine years. Hostages from the Valois family were held in London while John returned to France to raise his ransom. Edward had restored the lands of the former Angevin Empire, holding Normandy, Brittany, Anjou, Maine and the coastline from Flanders to Spain. When the hostages escaped back to France, John was horrified that his word had been broken and returned to England, where he eventually died.

Fighting in the Hundred Years' War spilled from the French and Plantagenet lands into surrounding realms, including the dynastic conflict in Castile between Peter of Castile and Henry II of Castile. The Black Prince allied himself with Peter, defeating Henry at the Battle of Nájera. Edward and Peter fell out when Peter was unable to reimburse Edward's military expenses, leaving him bankrupt. The Plantagenets continued to interfere, and John of Gaunt, 1st Duke of Lancaster, the Black Prince's brother, married Peter's daughter Constance, claiming the Crown of Castile in her name. He invaded with an army of 5,000 men; however, fighting was inconclusive, before Gaunt agreed to a treaty with King Juan of Castile. Terms of the treaty included the marriage of John of Gaunt's daughter Katherine to Juan's son, Enrique.

Charles V of France maintained the terms of the treaty of Brétigny but encouraged others in Aquitaine to challenge the authority of the Plantagenets in Aquitaine. The prince, who had suffered a debilitating illness for nearly a decade which often restricted his movement to being carried in a litter, returned to England, where he soon died. John of Gaunt assumed leadership in France with limited success, and peace negotiations over several years were inconclusive.

=== Descendants of Edward III ===
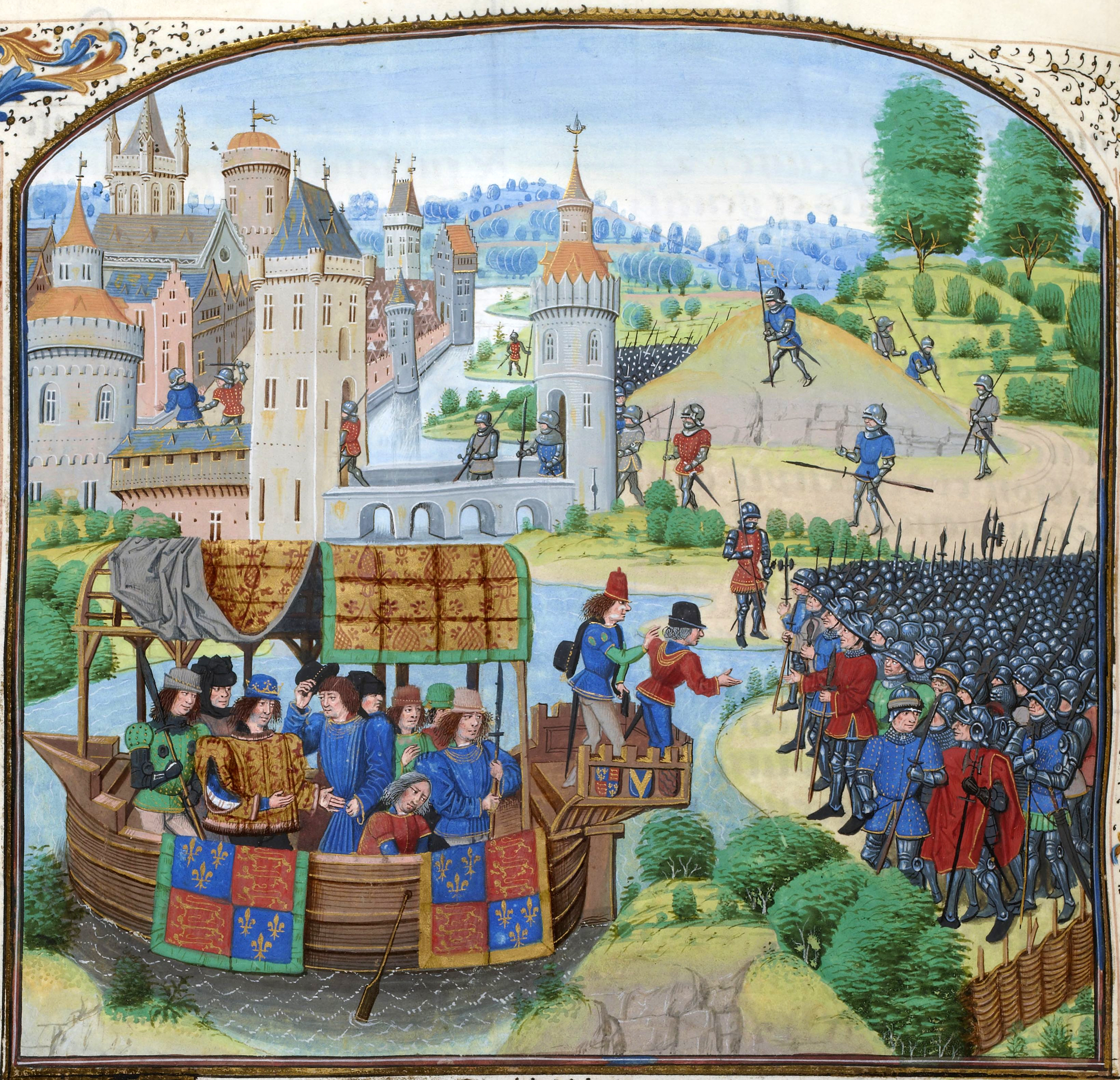
Richard II meets the rebels of the 1381 Peasants' Revolt, in an illumination from Froissart's Chronicles. Bibliothèque nationale de France, Paris.

The marriage of Edward III and Philippa of Hainault produced thirteen children and thirty-two grandchildren:

- Edward (1330–1376)—married his cousin Joan of Kent, a granddaughter of Edward I, with whom he had two sons:

- Edward (1365–1371/2)
- Richard (1367–1400)

- Isabella (1332–1382)—married Enguerrand VII, Lord of Coucy, and had two daughters:

- Marie
- Philippa

- Joan (1335–1348), an early victim of the Black Death.
- William (1334/6–1337)
- Lionel (1338–1368)—had one daughter with Elizabeth de Burgh:

- Philippa (1355–1378/81)—through Philippa, the House of York, by cognatic kinship, asserted that its claim to the throne was superior to the House of Lancaster's. Philippa's granddaughter and heir, Anne Mortimer, married Richard of Conisburgh, 3rd Earl of Cambridge, the Duke of York's heir. The earls of Northumberland and Clifford, significant supporters of the Lancasters during the Wars of the Roses, were descendants of Philippa through her other daughter, Elizabeth Mortimer.

- John of Gaunt (1340–1399)—married Blanche of Lancaster, the heiress to the duchy of Lancaster and a direct descendant of Henry III, and had seven children with her:

- Philippa (1360–1415)—married John I of Portugal.
- John (c. 1362/1364)—died as an infant.
- Elizabeth (1364–1426)—married John Hastings, 3rd Earl of Pembroke; John Holland, 1st Duke of Exeter; and John Cornwall, 1st Baron Fanhope; respectively.
- Edward of Lancaster (1365–1365)
- John of Lancaster (1366)—died as an infant.
- Henry (1367–1413)
- Isabella of Lancaster (b. 1368)—died as a child.
After Blanche's death in 1369, John married Constance of Castile, trying unsuccessfully to obtain the throne of Castile. The marriage produced two children:
- Catherine of Lancaster (1372–1418)—married Henry III of Castile, with whom she was a great-grandmother of Catherine of Aragon, first wife of Henry VIII of England.
- John (1374–1375)
Constance died in 1394, after which John married Katherine Swynford on 13 January 1396. Their four children were born before they married. The pope legitimised them in 1396, as did Richard II by charter, on the condition that their children could not ascend the throne:
- John (c. 1371/1372–1410)—grandfather of Margaret Beaufort, Henry VII's mother.
- Henry (1375–1447)
- Thomas (1377–1427)
- Joan (1379–1440)—Joan's son, Richard Neville, 5th Earl of Salisbury, and her grandson, Richard Neville, 16th Earl of Warwick, were leading supporters of the House of York.

- Edmund (1341–1402)—founder of the House of York. He had three children with Isabella of Castile:

- Edward (1373–1415)—killed at the Battle of Agincourt.
- Constance (1374–1416)
- Richard—(1375–1415)

- Blanche (1342)—died as a child.
- Mary of Waltham (1344–1362)—married John V, Duke of Brittany. No issue.
- Margaret (1346–1361)—married John Hastings, 2nd Earl of Pembroke. No issue.
- Joan (b. 1351)
- Thomas (1355–1397)—murdered or executed for treason by order of Richard II; his daughter, Anne, married Edmund Stafford.

Edward's long reign had forged a new identity, reinforced by Middle English beginning to establish itself as the spoken and written language of government. As a result, he is considered by the Oxford Dictionary of National Biography to be culturally the first English Plantagenet king.

=== Demise of the main line ===
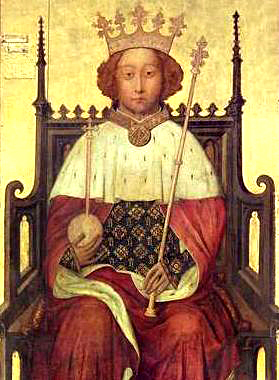
A portrait of Richard II (c. 1390). Westminster Abbey, London.

The Black Prince's ten-year-old son succeeded as Richard II of England on the death of his grandfather, nominally exercising all the powers of kingship, supported by various councils. His government levied poll taxes to finance military campaigns which, combined with the poor state of the economy, resulted in the Peasants' Revolt in 1381, followed by brutal reprisals against the rebels.

The king's uncle Thomas of Woodstock, 1st Duke of Gloucester; Richard FitzAlan, 11th Earl of Arundel; and Thomas de Beauchamp, 12th Earl of Warwick; became known as the Lords Appellant when they sought to impeach five of the king's favourites and restrain what was increasingly seen as tyrannical and capricious rule. Later they were joined by Henry Bolingbroke, the son and heir of John of Gaunt, and Thomas de Mowbray, 1st Duke of Norfolk. Initially, they were successful in establishing a commission to govern England for one year, but they were forced to rebel against Richard, defeating an army under Robert de Vere, Earl of Oxford, at the skirmish of Radcot Bridge.

Richard was reduced to a figurehead with little power. As a result of the Merciless Parliament, de Vere and Michael de la Pole, 1st Earl of Suffolk, who had fled abroad, were sentenced to death in their absence. Alexander Neville, Archbishop of York, had all his possessions confiscated. Several of Richard's council were executed. On John of Gaunt's return from Spain, Richard was able to re-establish his power, having Gloucester murdered in captivity in Calais. Warwick was stripped of his title. Bolingbroke and Mowbray were exiled.

When John of Gaunt died in 1399, Richard disinherited John's son, Henry, who invaded England in response with a small force that quickly grew in numbers. Meeting little resistance, Henry deposed Richard to have himself crowned Henry IV of England. Richard died in captivity early the next year, probably murdered, bringing an end to the main Plantagenet line. None of Henry's heirs were free from challenge on the grounds of not being the true heir of Richard II and that the Lancastrian dynasty had gained the throne by an act of usurpation.

== House of Lancaster ==
=== Henry IV ===
Henry married his Plantagenet cousin Mary de Bohun, who was paternally descended from Edward I and maternally from Edmund Crouchback. They had seven children:

- Edward (b. 1382; died as a child)—buried at Monmouth Castle, Monmouth.
- Henry (1386–1422)—had one son:

- Henry (1421–1471)—also had one son:

- Edward (1453–1471)

- Thomas (1387–1421)—killed at the Battle of Baugé. His marriage to Margaret Holland proved childless; he had an illegitimate son named John, also known as the Bastard of Clarence.
- John (1389–1435)—had two childless marriages: to Anne of Burgundy, daughter of John the Fearless, and Jacquetta of Luxembourg. John had an illegitimate son and daughter, named Richard and Mary, respectively.
- Humphrey (1390–1447)—died under suspicious circumstances while imprisoned for treason against Henry VI; his death may have been the result of a stroke.
- Blanche (1392–1409)—married Louis III, Count Palatine of the Rhine, in 1402.
- Philippa (1394–1430)—married Eric of Pomerania, king of Denmark, Norway and Sweden, in 1406.

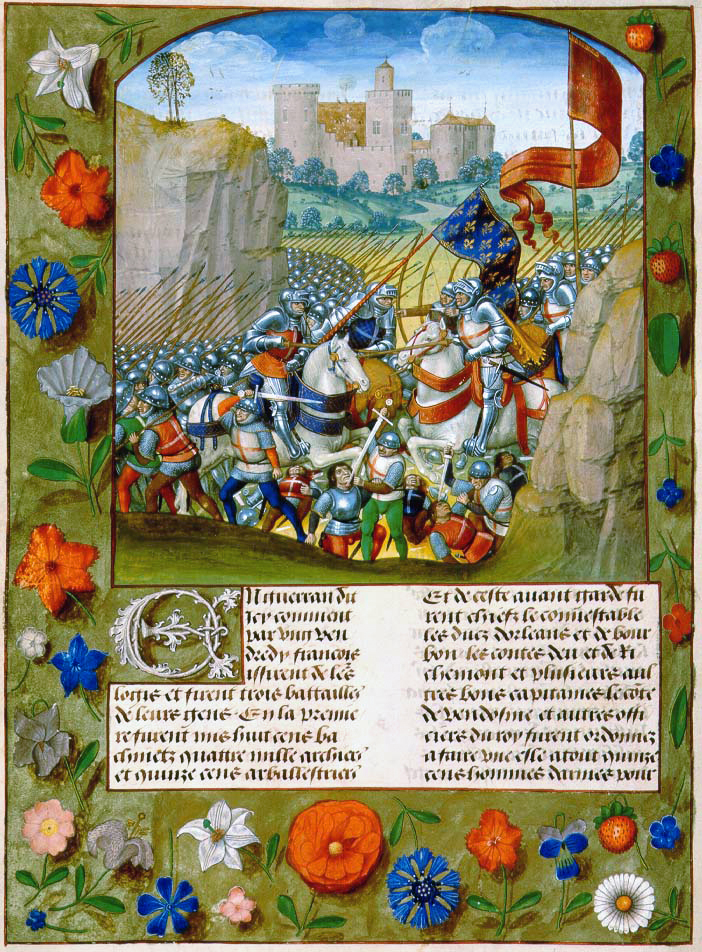
Parchment miniature of Henry V's victory at the Battle of Agincourt in 1415, from Enguerrand de Monstrelet's Chronique de France circa 1495

Henry went to convoluted legal means to justify his succession. Many Lancastrians asserted that his mother had had legitimate rights through her descent from Edmund Crouchback, who it was claimed was the elder son of Henry III of England, set aside due to deformity. As the great-grandson of Lionel of Antwerp, 1st Duke of Clarence, Edmund Mortimer, Earl of March, was the heir presumptive to Richard II and Henry used multiple rationales stressing his Plantagenet descent, divine grace, powerful friends, and Richard's misgovernment.

In fact, Mortimer never showed interest in the throne. The later marriage of his sister Anne to Richard of Conisburgh, 3rd Earl of Cambridge consolidated this claim to the throne with that of the more junior House of York. Henry planned to resume war with France, but was plagued with financial problems, declining health and frequent rebellions. He defeated a Scottish invasion, a serious rebellion by Henry Percy, 1st Earl of Northumberland in the North and Owain Glyndŵr's rebellion in Wales. Many saw it as a punishment from God when Henry was later struck down with unknown but chronic illnesses.

=== Henry V ===
Henry IV died in 1413. His son and successor, Henry V of England, aware that Charles VI of France's mental illness had caused instability in France, invaded to assert the Plantagenet claims and won a near total victory over the French at the Battle of Agincourt. In subsequent years Henry recaptured much of Normandy and secured marriage to Catherine of Valois. The resulting Treaty of Troyes stated that Henry's heirs would inherit the throne of France, but conflict continued with the Dauphin.

=== Henry VI ===
When Henry V died in 1422, his nine-month-old son succeeded him as Henry VI of England. During the minority of Henry VI the war caused political division among his Plantagenet uncles, Bedford, Humphrey of Lancaster, 1st Duke of Gloucester, and Cardinal Beaufort. Humphrey's wife was accused of treasonable necromancy after two astrologers in her employ unwisely, if honestly, predicted a serious illness would endanger Henry VI's life, and Humphrey was later arrested and died in prison.

Depopulation stemming from the Black Death led to increased wages, static food costs and a resulting improvement in the standard of living for the peasantry. However, under Henry misgovernment and harvest failures depressed the English economy to a pitiful state known as the Great Slump. The economy was in ruins by 1450, a consequence of the loss of France, piracy in the channel and poor trading relations with the Hanseatic League. The economic slowdown began in the 1430s in the north of the country, spreading south in the 1440s, with the economy not recovering until the 1480s.

It was also driven by multiple harvest failures in the 1430s and disease amongst livestock, which drove up the price of food and damaged the wider economy. Certain groups were particularly badly affected: cloth exports fell by 35 per cent in just four years at the end of the 1440s, collapsing by up to 90 per cent in some parts of the South-West. The Crown's debts reached £372,000, Henry's deficit was £20,000 per annum, and tax revenues were half those of his father.

== House of York ==
=== Pre-regnal history ===
Richard II made his uncle (Edward III's fourth son) Edmund the first duke of York in 1385. Edmund was married to Isabella, a daughter of King Peter of Castile and María de Padilla and the sister of Constance of Castile, who was the second wife of Edmund's brother John of Gaunt. Both of Edmund's sons were killed in 1415. The younger, Richard, became involved in the Southampton Plot, a conspiracy to depose Henry V in favour of Richard's brother-in-law Edmund Mortimer. When Mortimer revealed the plot to the king, Richard was executed for treason. Richard's childless older brother Edward was killed at the Battle of Agincourt later the same year.

Constance of York was Edmund's only daughter and was an ancestor of Queen Anne Neville. The increasingly interwoven Plantagenet relationships were demonstrated by Edmund's second marriage to Joan Holland. Her sister Alianore Holland was mother to Richard's wife, Anne Mortimer. Margaret Holland, another of Joan's sisters, married John of Gaunt's son. She later married Thomas of Lancaster, John of Gaunt's grandson by King Henry IV. A third sister, Eleanor Holland, was mother-in-law to Richard Neville, 5th Earl of Salisbury—John's grandson by his daughter Joan Beaufort, Countess of Westmorland. These sisters were all granddaughters of Joan of Kent, the mother of Richard II, and therefore Plantagenet descendants of Edward I.

Edmund's son Richard was married to Anne Mortimer, the daughter of Roger Mortimer, 4th Earl of March and Eleanor Holland and great-granddaughter of Edward III's second surviving son Lionel. Anne died giving birth to their only son in September 1411. Richard's execution four years later left two orphans: Isabel, who married into the Bourchier family, and a son who was also called Richard.

Although his earldom was forfeited, Richard (the father) was not attainted, and the four-year-old orphan Richard was his heir. Within months of his father's death, Richard's childless uncle, Edward Duke of York, was killed at Agincourt. Richard was allowed to inherit the title of Duke of York in 1426. In 1432 he acquired the earldoms of March and Ulster on the death of his maternal uncle Edmund Mortimer, Earl of March, who had died campaigning with Henry V in France, and the earldom of Cambridge which had belonged to his father.

Being descended from Edward III in both the maternal and the paternal line gave Richard a significant claim to the throne if the Lancastrian line should fail, and by cognatic primogeniture arguably a superior claim. He emphasised the point by being the first to assume the Plantagenet surname in 1448. Having inherited the March and Ulster titles, he became the wealthiest and most powerful noble in England, second only to the king himself. Richard married Cecily Neville, a granddaughter of John of Gaunt, and had thirteen or possibly fifteen children:

- Anne of York (1439–1476)—(Mitochondrial DNA taken from a descendant of her second daughter, Anne St Leger, Baroness de Ros, was used in the identification of the remains of Richard III, which were found in 2012.)
- Henry (b. 1441; died as a child)
- Edward (1442–1483)
- Edmund (1443–1460)
- Elizabeth (1444–1503)—married John de la Pole, 2nd Duke of Suffolk; she was the mother of several claimants to the throne.
- Margaret (1446–1503)—married Charles the Bold, Duke of Burgundy.
- William (b. 1447; died as a child)
- John (b. 1448; died as a child)
- George (1449–1478)
- Thomas (b. 1450/51; died as a child)
- Richard (1452–1485)
- Ursula (b. 1455; died as a child)
- In her will, Cecily stated that Katherine and Humphrey were her children, but they may have been her grandchildren through de la Pole.

=== Conflict over the crown ===
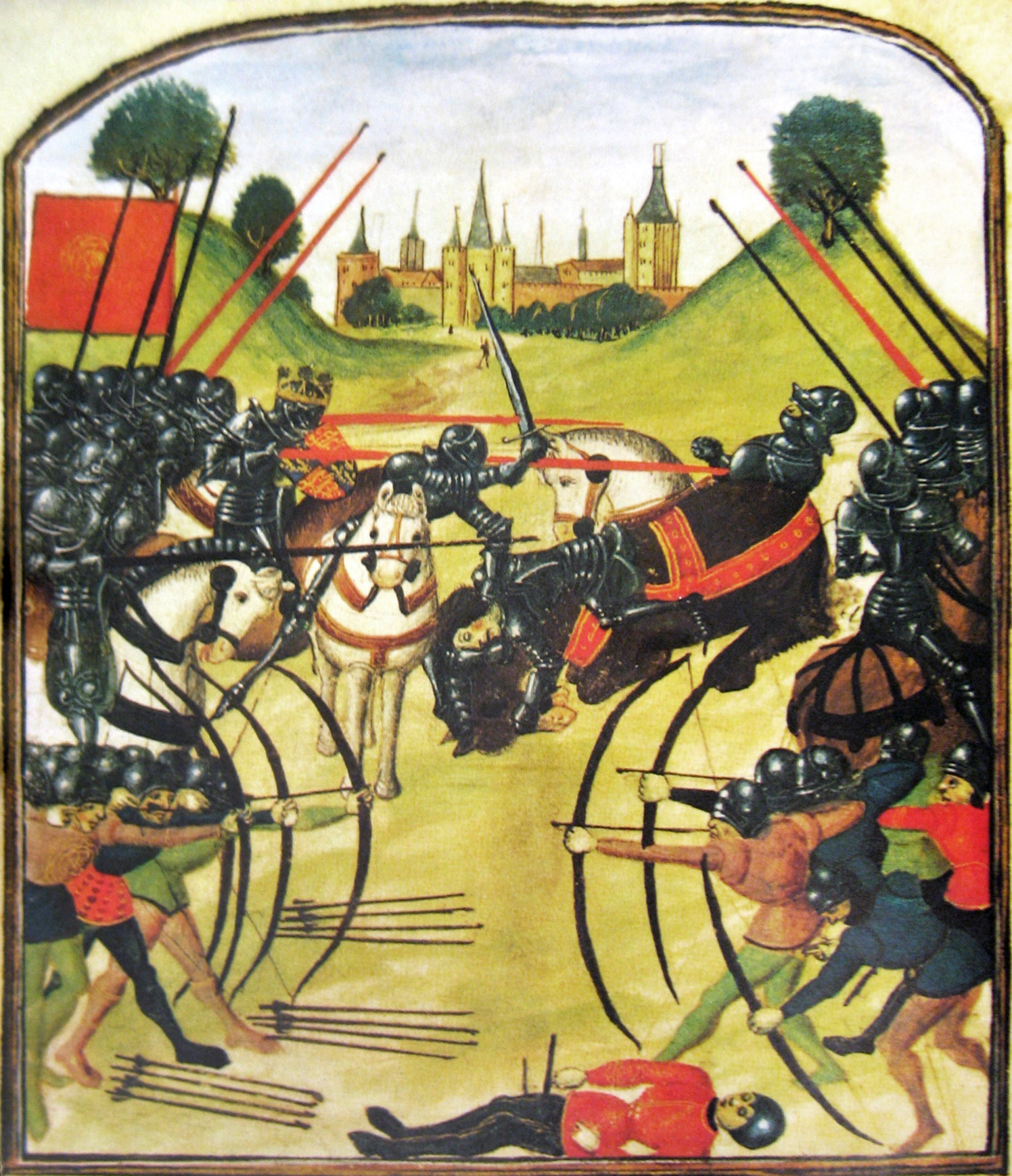
The Battle of Tewkesbury of 1471, as illustrated in the Ghent manuscript

When Henry VI had a mental breakdown, Richard was named regent, but the birth of a male heir resolved the question of succession. When Henry's sanity returned, the court party reasserted its authority, but Richard of York and the Nevilles defeated them at a skirmish called the First Battle of St Albans. The ruling class was deeply shocked and reconciliation was attempted. York and the Nevilles fled abroad, but the Nevilles returned to win the Battle of Northampton, where they captured Henry.

When Richard of York joined them he surprised Parliament by claiming the throne and forcing through the Act of Accord, which stated that Henry would remain as king for his lifetime, but would be succeeded by York. Margaret found this disregard for her son's claims unacceptable, and so the conflict continued. York was killed at the Battle of Wakefield and his head set on display at Micklegate Bar along with those of Edmund, Earl of Rutland, and Richard Neville, Earl of Salisbury, who had been captured and beheaded. The Scottish queen Mary of Guelders provided Margaret with support but London welcomed York's son Edward, Earl of March and Parliament confirmed that Edward should be made king. He was crowned after consolidating his position with victory at the Battle of Towton.

Edward's preferment of the former Lancastrian-supporting Woodville family, following his marriage to Elizabeth Woodville, led Warwick and Clarence to help Margaret depose Edward and return Henry to the throne. Edward and Richard, Duke of Gloucester, fled, but on their return, Clarence switched sides at the Battle of Barnet, leading to the death of the Neville brothers. The subsequent Battle of Tewkesbury brought the demise of the last of the male line of the Beauforts. The battlefield casualty of Edward of Westminster, Prince of Wales, and the later probable murder of Henry VI extinguished the House of Lancaster.

=== Edward IV ===
By the mid-1470s, the victorious House of York looked safely established, with seven living male princes: Edward IV, his two sons, his brother George and George's son, his brother Richard and Richard's son. Edward and Elizabeth Woodville themselves had ten children, seven of whom survived him:

- Elizabeth (1466–1503)—Queen Consort to Henry VII of England
- Mary (1467–1482)
- Cecily (1469–1507)—initially married John Welles, 1st Viscount Welles, and later married Thomas Kyme (or Keme) following John's death.
- Edward (1470 – c. 1483)—briefly succeeded his father as King Edward V.
- Margaret (1472; died that year)
- Richard (1473 – c. 1483)
- Anne (1475–1511)—married Thomas Howard
- George (1477–1479)
- Catherine of York (1479–1527)—married William Courtenay, 1st Earl of Devon.
- Bridget of York (1480–1517)—became a nun — possibly had an illegitimate daughter called Agnes of Eltham

=== Princes in the Tower and Richard III ===
Dynastic infighting and misfortune quickly brought about the demise of the House of York. George Plantagenet, 1st Duke of Clarence, plotted against his brother and was executed. Following Edward's premature death in 1483, the Three Estates of the Realm, assembled in an informal Parliament, declared Edward's two sons illegitimate on the grounds of an alleged prior marriage to Lady Eleanor Talbot, leaving Edward's marriage invalid.

Richard III ascended to the throne, and the Princes in the Tower's fate is unclear. Richard's son predeceased him and Richard was killed in 1485 after an invasion by the forces of Henry Tudor, who claimed the throne through his mother Margaret Beaufort, who was a great-granddaughter of John of Gaunt. Henry assumed the throne as Henry VII, founding the Tudor dynasty and bringing the Plantagenet line of kings to an end.

== House of Tudor and other Plantagenet descendants ==
=== Tudor ===
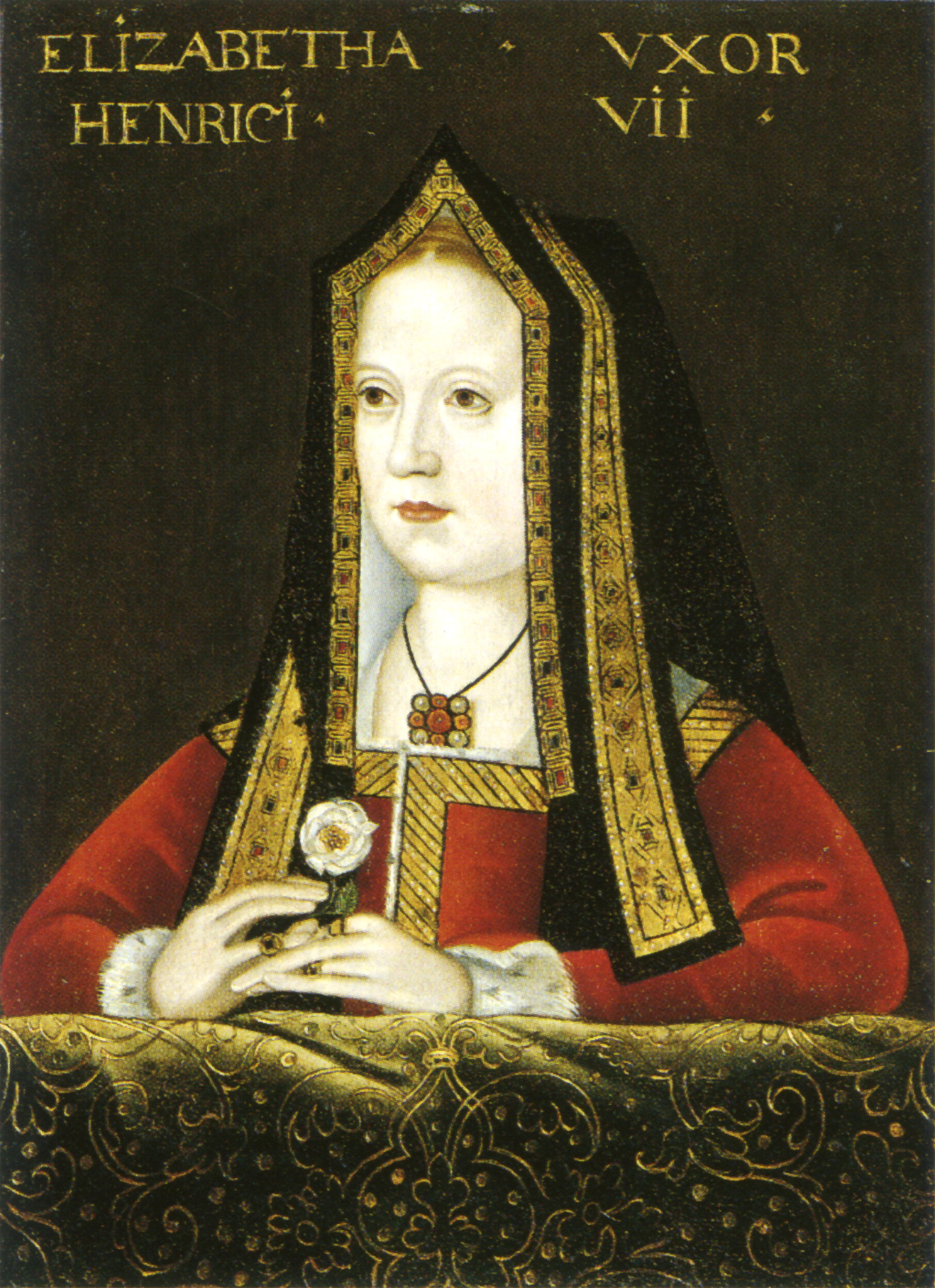
Elizabeth of York

When Henry VII of England seized the throne there were eighteen Plantagenet descendants who might today be thought to have a stronger hereditary claim, and by 1510 this number had been increased further by the birth of sixteen Yorkist children. Henry mitigated this situation with his marriage to Elizabeth of York. She was the eldest daughter of Edward IV, and all their children were his cognatic heirs. Indeed, Polydore Vergil noted Henry VIII's pronounced resemblance to his grandfather Edward: "For just as Edward was the most warmly thought of by the English people amongst all English kings, so this successor of his, Henry, was very much like him in general appearance, in greatness of mind and generosity and for that reason was the most acclaimed and approved of all."

This did not deter Margaret of York, Duchess of Burgundy—Edward's sister and Elizabeth's aunt—and members of the de la Pole family—children of Edward's sister and John de la Pole, 2nd Duke of Suffolk— from frequent attempts to destabilise Henry's regime. Henry imprisoned Margaret's nephew Edward, Earl of Warwick, the son of her brother George, in the Tower of London, but in 1487 Margaret financed a rebellion led by Lambert Simnel whose true identity remains uncertain, though he himself presented himself as 'Edward VI'. John de la Pole, 1st Earl of Lincoln, joined the revolt, probably anticipating that it would further his own ambitions to the throne, but he was killed in the suppression of the uprising at the Battle of Stoke Field in 1487. Warwick was implicated by two further failed invasions supported by Margaret by the so called Perkin Warbeck claiming to be Edward IV's son Richard of Shrewsbury, and supposedly Warbeck's later planned escape for them both; Warwick was executed in 1499; with his death the House of Plantagenet went extinct in the legitimate male line. Edward's execution may simply have been a precondition for the marriage of Arthur, Prince of Wales to Katherine of Aragon in 1501.

=== De la Pole ===
John de la Pole's attainder meant that his brother Edmund inherited their father's titles, but much of the wealth of the duchy of Suffolk was forfeit. Edmund did not possess sufficient finances to maintain his status as a duke, so as a compromise he accepted the title of earl of Suffolk. Financial difficulties led to frequent legal conflicts and Edmund's indictment for murder in 1501. He fled with his brother Richard, while their remaining brother, William, was imprisoned in the Tower—where he would remain until his death 37 years later—as part of a general suppression of Edmund's associates. Philip the Fair had been holding Edmund and in 1506 he returned him to Henry. Edmund was imprisoned in the Tower. In 1513, he was executed after Richard de la Pole, whom Louis XII of France had recognised as king of England the previous year, claimed the kingship in his own right. Richard, known as the White Rose, plotted an invasion of England for years but was killed in 1525 at the Battle of Pavia while fighting as the captain of the French landsknechts during François I of France's invasion of Italy.

=== Pole ===
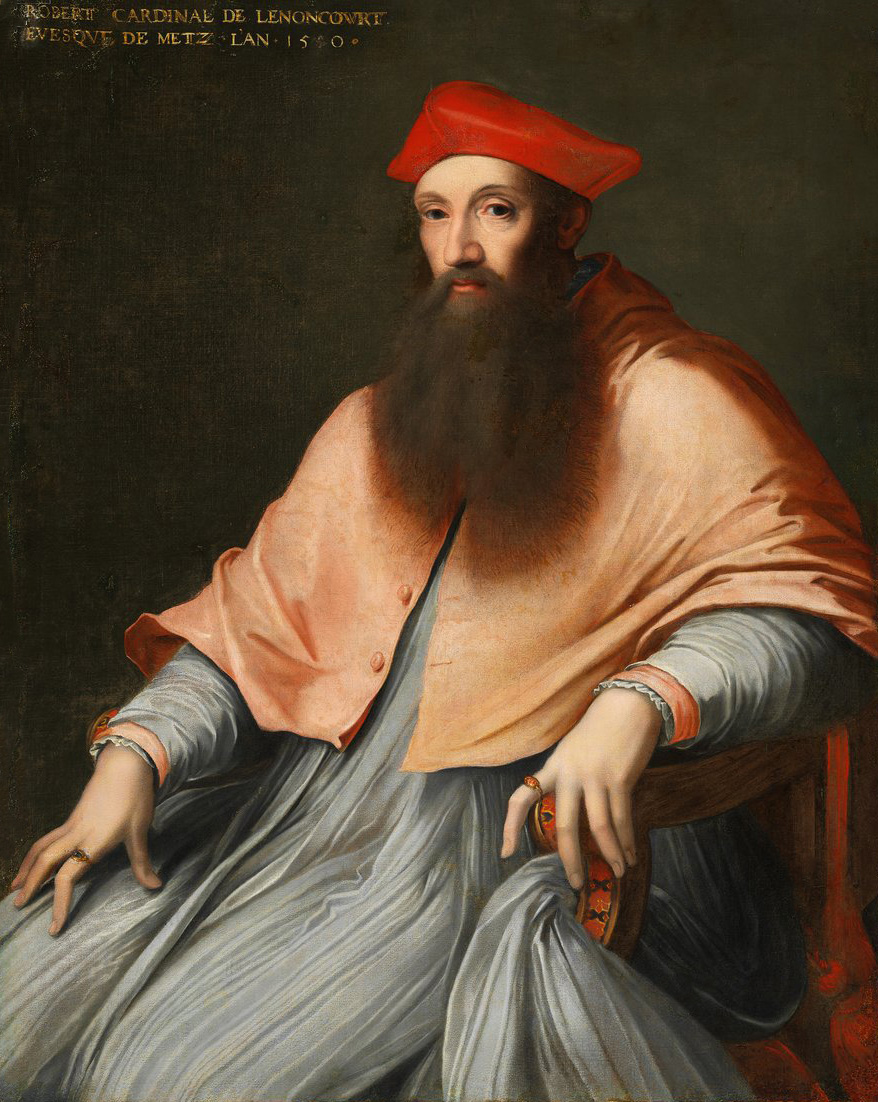
Cardinal Reginald Pole

Warwick's sister, and therefore Edward IV's niece, Margaret Pole, Countess of Salisbury, was executed by Henry VIII in 1541. By then, the cause was more religious and political rather than dynastic. The attainder of her father, Clarence, was a legal bar to any claims to the throne by his children. Additionally her marriage, arranged by Henry VII, to Sir Richard Pole, his half-cousin and trusted supporter, was not auspicious. Nevertheless, it did allow the couple to be closely involved in court affairs. Margaret's fortunes improved under Henry VIII and in February 1512 she was restored to the earldom of Salisbury and all the Warwicks' lands. This made her the first and, apart from Anne Boleyn, the only woman in 16th-century England to hold a peerage title in her own right.

Her daughter Ursula married the son of Edward Stafford, 3rd Duke of Buckingham. Buckingham's fall after arguments with the king over property, and Margaret's open support for Catherine of Aragon and Princess Mary began the Poles' estrangement from the king. Hope of reconciliation was dashed by De unitate, the letter that Margaret's son Reginald Pole wrote to Henry VIII, in which Reginald declared his opposition to the royal supremacy. In 1538 evidence came to light that Pole family members in England had been in communication with Reginald. Margaret's sons Geoffrey and Henry were arrested for treason along with several friends and associates, including Henry's wife and brother-in-law—Edward Neville. Among those arrested was the king's cousin Henry Courtenay, 1st Marquess of Exeter, his wife and 11-year-old son. Courteney's wife was released two years later, but their son spent 15 years in the Tower until Queen Mary released him. Except for the surviving Geoffrey Pole, all the others implicated were beheaded.

Margaret was attainted. The possibility of an invasion involving Reginald via her south coast estates and her embittered relationship with Henry VIII precluded any chance of pardon. However, the decision to execute her seems a spontaneous, rather than a premeditated, act. According to the Calendar of State Papers, her execution was botched at the hands of "a wretched and blundering youth ... who literally hacked her head and shoulders to pieces in the most pitiful manner". In 1886 she was beatified by Pope Leo XIII on the grounds she had laid down her life for the Holy See "and for the truth of the orthodox Faith".

=== Stafford ===
Edward Stafford, 3rd Duke of Buckingham, combined multiple lines of Plantagenet descent: from Edward III by his son Thomas of Woodstock, from Edward III via two of his Beaufort grandchildren, and from Edward I from Joan of Kent and the Holland family. His father failed in his rebellion against Richard III in 1483 but was restored to his inheritance on the reversal of his father's attainder late in 1485. His mother married Henry VII's uncle Jasper Tudor, and his wardship was entrusted to the king's mother, Lady Margaret Beaufort. In 1502, during Henry VII's illness, there was debate as to whether Buckingham or Edmund de la Pole should act as regent for Henry VIII. There is no evidence of continuous hostility between Buckingham and Henry VIII, but there is little doubt of the duke's dislike of Thomas Wolsey, whom he believed to be plotting to ruin the old nobility. Therefore, Henry VIII instructed Wolsey to watch Buckingham, his brother Henry Stafford, 1st Earl of Wiltshire, and three other peers. Neither Henry VIII nor his father planned to destroy Buckingham because of his lineage and Henry VIII even allowed Buckingham's son and heir, Henry Stafford, 1st Baron Stafford, to marry Ursula Pole, giving the Staffords a further line of royal blood descent. Buckingham himself was arrested in April 1521; he was found guilty on 16 May and executed the next day. Evidence was provided that the duke had been listening to prophecies that he would be king and that the Tudor family lay under God's curse for the execution of Warwick. This was said to explain Henry VIII's failure to produce a male heir. Much of this evidence consisted of ill-judged comments, speculation and bad temper, but it underlined the threat presented by Buckingham's descent.

=== Tudor succession ===
As late as 1600, with the Tudor succession in doubt, older Plantagenet lines remained as possible claimants to a disputed throne, and religious and dynastic factors gave rise to complications. Thomas Wilson wrote in his report The State of England, Anno Domini 1600 that there were 12 "competitors" for the succession. At the time of writing (about 1601), Wilson had been working on intelligence matters for Lord Buckhurst and Sir Robert Cecil. The alleged competitors included five descendants of Henry VII and Elizabeth, including the eventual successor James I of England, but also seven from older Plantagenet lines:

- Henry Hastings, 3rd Earl of Huntingdon
- George Hastings, 4th Earl of Huntingdon
- Charles Neville, 6th Earl of Westmorland
- Henry Percy, 9th Earl of Northumberland
- António, Prior of Crato
- Ranuccio I Farnese, Duke of Parma
- Philip III of Spain and his infant daughter

Ranulph Crewe, Chief Justice of the King's Bench, argued that by 1626 the House of Plantagenet could not be considered to remain in existence in a speech during the Oxford Peerage case, which was to rule on who should inherit the earldom of Oxford. It was referred by Charles I of England to the House of Lords, who called for judicial assistance. Crewe said:

I have labored to make a covenant with myself, that affection may not press upon judgement; for I suppose there is no man that hath any apprehension of gentry or nobleness, but his affection stands to the continuance of a house so illustrious, and would take hold of a twig or twine-thread to support it. And yet time hath his revolutions; there must be a period and an end to all temporal things – finis rerum – an end of names and dignities, and whatsoever is terrene; and why not of de Vere? For where is Bohun? Where is Mowbray? Where is Mortimer? Nay, which is more, and most of all, where is Plantagenet? They are entombed in the urns and sepulchres of mortality! yet let the name of de Vere stand so long as it pleaseth God.

== Genealogy ==
Family tree

This family tree includes selected members of the House of Plantagenet who were born legitimate.

House of Lancaster
House of York

Geoffrey V, Count of Anjou; 1113–1151
**Henry II, King of England**; 1133–1189	Geoffrey, Count of Nantes; 1134–1158	William FitzEmpress; 1136–1164
Henry the Young King; 1155–1183	**Richard I, King of England**; 1157–1199	Geoffrey II, Duke of Brittany; 1158–1186	**John, King of England**; 1167–1216
Arthur I, Duke of Brittany; 1187–1203	**Henry III, King of England**; 1207–1272	Richard, King of Germany; 1209–1272
**Edward I, King of England**; 1239–1307	Edmund, 1st Earl of Lancaster; 1245–1296	Henry of Almain; 1235–1271	Edmund, 2nd Earl of Cornwall; 1249–1300
Alphonso, Earl of Chester; 1273–1284	**Edward II, King of England**; 1284–1327	Thomas, 1st Earl of Norfolk; 1300–1338	Edmund, 1st Earl of Kent; 1301–1330	Thomas, 2nd Earl of Lancaster c. 1278–1322	Henry, 3rd Earl of Lancaster c. 1281–1345
**Edward III, King of England**; 1312–1377	John, Earl of Cornwall; 1316–1336	Edmund, 2nd Earl of Kent; 1326–1331	John, 3rd Earl of Kent; 1330–1352	Henry, Duke of Lancaster c. 1310–1361
Edward, Prince of Wales; 1330–1376	John, Duke of Lancaster; 1340–1399	Edmund, 1st Duke of York; 1341–1402	Lionel, Duke of Clarence; 1338–1368	Thomas, Duke of Gloucester; 1355–1397
House of Beaufort	Two generations skipped
**Richard II, King of England**; 1367–1400	John Beaufort, Earl of Somerset (legitimated)	**Henry IV, King of England**; 1367–1413	Edward, 2nd Duke of York c. 1373–1415	Richard, Earl of Cambridge; 1385–1415	Anne Mortimer; 1388–1411	Humphrey, Earl of Buckingham; 1382–1399
**Henry V, King of England**; 1386–1422	Thomas, Duke of Clarence; 1387–1421	John Beaufort, Duke of Somerset; 1404–1444	John, Duke of Bedford; 1389–1435	Humphrey, Duke of Gloucester; 1390–1447	Richard, 3rd Duke of York; 1411–1460
**Henry VI, King of England**; 1421–1471	Margaret Beaufort; 1443–1509	**Edward IV, King of England**; 1442–1483	Edmund, Earl of Rutland; 1443–1460	George, Duke of Clarence; 1449–1478	**Richard III, King of England**; 1452–1485	Elizabeth, Duchess of Suffolk; 1444 – c. 1503
House of Tudor
Edward, Prince of Wales; 1453–1471	**Henry VII, King of England**; 1457–1509	Elizabeth of York; 1466–1503	**Edward V, King of England**; 1470–?	Richard of Shrewsbury; 1473–?	Margaret Pole, Countess of Salisbury	Edward, Earl of Warwick; 1475–1499	Edward, Prince of Wales; 1473–1484	House of York-de la Pole
House of Pole

List of male-line members of the House of Plantagenet

Male, male-line, legitimate, non-morganatic members of the house who either lived to adulthood, or who held a title as a child, are included. Kings of England are in bold.

- **Henry II of England**, 1133–1189
  - Henry the Young King, 1155–1183
  - **Richard I of England**, 1157–1199
  - Geoffrey, Duke of Brittany, 1158–1186
    - Arthur I, Duke of Brittany, 1187–1203
  - **John of England**, 1167–1216
    - **Henry III of England**, 1207–1272
      - **Edward I of England**, 1239–1307
        - **Edward II of England**, 1284–1327
          - **Edward III of England**, 1312–1377
            - Edward, the Black Prince, 1330–1376
              - **Richard II of England**, 1367–1400
            - Lionel of Antwerp, 1st Duke of Clarence, 1338–1368
            - John of Gaunt, 1st Duke of Lancaster, 1340–1399
              - **Henry IV of England**, 1366–1413
                - **Henry V of England**, 1386–1422
                  - **Henry VI of England**, 1421–1471
                    - Edward of Westminster, 1453–1471
                - Thomas, Duke of Clarence, 1387–1421
                - John, Duke of Bedford, 1389–1435
                - Humphrey, Duke of Gloucester, 1390–1447
            - Edmund of Langley, 1st Duke of York, 1341–1402
              - Edward of Norwich, 2nd Duke of York, 1373–1415
              - Richard of Conisburgh, 3rd Earl of Cambridge, 1375–1415
                - Richard Plantagenet, 3rd Duke of York, 1411–1460
                  - **Edward IV of England**, 1442–1483
                    - **Edward V of England**, 1470–?
                    - Richard of Shrewsbury, 1st Duke of York, 1473–?
                  - Edmund, Earl of Rutland, 1443–1460
                  - George Plantagenet, 1st Duke of Clarence, 1449–1478
                    - Edward Plantagenet, 17th Earl of Warwick, 1475–1499, the last legitimate male-line Plantagenet
                  - **Richard III of England**, 1452–1485
            - Thomas of Woodstock, 1st Duke of Gloucester, 1355–1397
              - Humphrey, 2nd Earl of Buckingham, 1381–1399
          - John of Eltham, Earl of Cornwall, 1316–1336
        - Thomas of Brotherton, 1st Earl of Norfolk, 1300–1338
          - Edward of Norfolk, 1313–1334
        - Edmund of Woodstock, 1st Earl of Kent, 1301–1330
          - Edmund, 2nd Earl of Kent, 1326–1331
          - John, 3rd Earl of Kent, 1330–1352
      - Edmund Crouchback, 1st Earl of Lancaster, 1245–1296
        - Thomas Plantagenet, 2nd Earl of Lancaster, 1278–1322
        - Henry, 3rd Earl of Lancaster, 1281–1345
          - Henry of Grosmont, 1st Duke of Lancaster, 1310–1361
        - John of Beaufort, Lord of Beaufort, 1286–1317
    - Richard, 1st Earl of Cornwall, 1209–1272
      - Henry of Almain, 1235–1271
      - Edmund, 2nd Earl of Cornwall, 1249–1300

== Notes ==
— Royal house — House of Plantagenet Deposition: 1485
Preceded by House of Blois	Ruling House of England: Angevins (until 1214); House of Lancaster (1399–1461); House of York (1461–1485); 1154–1485	Succeeded by House of Tudor
Preceded by House of Penthièvre	Ruling House of Brittany; 1181–1203	Succeeded by House of Thouars
Preceded by House of Ingelger	Ruling House of Anjou until 1203	Succeeded by House of Anjou (Capetian)
