= Edmund of Woodstock, 1st Earl of Kent =

English prince and nobleman (1301–1330)

Edmund of Woodstock
- Earl of Kent
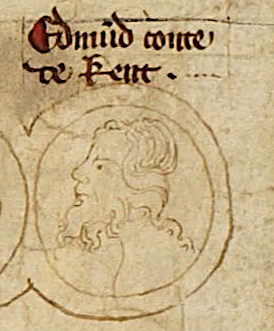
- Reign: 26 July 1321 – 19 March 1330
- Born: 5 August 1301; Woodstock Palace, Woodstock, Oxfordshire
- Died: 19 March 1330 (aged 28); Winchester Castle
- Burial: Westminster Abbey
- Spouse: Margaret Wake, 3rd Baroness Wake of Liddell (m. 1325)
- Issue: Edmund, 2nd Earl of Kent; Margaret of Kent; Joan, 4th Countess of Kent; John, 3rd Earl of Kent
- House: Plantagenet
- Father: Edward I of England
- Mother: Margaret of France

Arms of Edmund of Woodstock, 1st Earl of Kent: Royal arms of King Edward I, a bordure argent for difference

Edmund of Woodstock, 1st Earl of Kent (5 August 1301 – 19 March 1330), whose seat was Arundel Castle in Sussex, was the sixth and youngest son of King Edward I of England, and the second son of his second wife Margaret of France, and was a younger half-brother of King Edward II. Edward I had intended to make substantial grants of land to Edmund, but when the king died in 1307, Edward II refused to respect his father's intentions, mainly due to his favouritism towards Piers Gaveston. Edmund remained loyal to his brother, and in 1321 he was created Earl of Kent. He played an important part in Edward's administration as diplomat and military commander and in 1321–22 helped suppress a rebellion.

Discontent against the King grew and eventually affected Edmund. The discontent was largely caused by Edward's preference for his new favourites, Hugh Despenser the Younger and his father. In 1326, Edmund joined a rebellion led by Queen Isabella and Roger Mortimer, whereby King Edward II was deposed. Edmund failed to get along with the new administration, and in 1330 he was caught planning a new rebellion and executed.

Once the new king, Edward III, came of age and assumed personal control of the government, he posthumously annulled the charges against his uncle. The title and estates of the Earl of Kent descended on Edmund's son, also called Edmund. When this Edmund died, in 1331, his brother John became earl. Though he was officially exonerated, Edmund did not enjoy a great reputation during his life and afterwards, due to his unreliable political dealings.

== Family background and early years ==
Edward I had a great number of children with his first wife, Eleanor of Castile, but only one son who survived into adulthood – the future Edward II (born 1284).^{[a]} After Eleanor died, the king married Margaret of France, with whom he had two children who survived to adulthood: Thomas (born 1300) and, when the king was sixty-two, Edmund. Edmund was born at Woodstock in Oxfordshire on 5 August 1301, and was therefore referred to as Edmund of Woodstock. Son of the English king, he was also, through his mother, grandson of Philip III of France. On 7 July 1307, before Edmund had turned six, King Edward I died, leaving Edmund's half-brother Edward to succeed as King Edward II.

Though not resident in the two boys' household, Edward I had taken great interest in the princes' upbringing and well-being. Before he died, the king had promised to provide Edmund with substantial grants of land. In August 1306, Edward I signed a charter promising Edmund land worth 7000 marks a year, and in May 1307, 1000 marks were added to this. He probably intended to give the earldom of Norfolk to Thomas, while Edmund would receive the earldom of Cornwall, which had been left vacant after Edward I's cousin Edmund died without children in 1300.

When Edward II came to the throne, however, he went against his father's wishes by granting the earldom of Cornwall to his favourite Piers Gaveston. According to the chronicle Vita Edwardi Secundi, this act was a grave insult to the king's younger brothers. Edward II, nevertheless, took steps to provide his half-brother with an income; grants made in 1315 and 1319 secured Edmund 2000 marks a year. In May 1321, Edmund received the strategically important Gloucester Castle, and further grants followed his creation as Earl of Kent on 28 July 1321.^{[c]}

Edward II's close relationship with Gaveston had been a source of conflict at court, and Gaveston's execution by a group of rebellious barons in 1312 had brought the country to the brink of civil war. As Edmund came of age, he became an important member of the circle around his brother. In 1318, the Treaty of Leake was drafted as an effort to reconcile the opposing parties, and Edmund – as his first public act – was among the witnesses to sign this treaty.

Further official appointments followed. In the spring of 1320 he took part in an embassy to Pope John XXII in Avignon, where the mission was to absolve the king of his oath to uphold the Ordinances, a set of restrictions imposed on royal authority by the baronage. Later that year, he joined his brother the king in Amiens, where Edward was paying homage to the French king. In October 1320, Edmund attended his first parliament.

== Civil war ==
As the political conflict escalated into full-scale rebellion in 1321–22, Edmund played an important role in its suppression. The opposition stemmed from resentment against the king's new favourites, Hugh Despenser the Younger and Hugh Despenser the Elder. When Bartholomew Badlesmere, steward of the royal household, defected to the opposition, Edward made his youngest brother Lord Warden of the Cinque Ports in place of Badlesmere on 16 June. In the parliament of July 1321, Edmund briefly sided with the opposition when he agreed to exile the Despensers, but later claimed this had been done under duress, and in November sat on the council that annulled the exile.

In October, Edmund was once more employed in a move against Badlesmere, when he took part in a siege on Leeds Castle in Kent, which was held by Badlesmere. After Badlesmere was forced to surrender, hostilities moved to the Welsh Marches, where Roger Mortimer and others were in open revolt. Once confronted with the royal army, Mortimer surrendered without a fight, and attention turned to the leader of the baronial opposition, Thomas of Lancaster. Edmund, who had taken part in the Marcher campaign, was now ordered, with the Earl of Surrey, to take Lancaster's castle of Pontefract. On 17 March 1322, Lancaster was captured after his defeat at the Battle of Boroughbridge and brought to Pontefract. Here, Edmund was on the jury that condemned him to death for treason.^{[d]}

Even with Lancaster defeated, the battle against the rebels was not over. Edmund was charged with overtaking Wallingford Castle from Maurice de Berkeley in January 1323, a task which he fulfilled with great success. For his loyalty, Edmund was rewarded with substantial holdings in Wales, primarily land forfeited by Roger Mortimer.^{[e]} The greater part of the spoils of war, however, went to the Despensers, who both benefited greatly from the forfeiture of the rebels. By 1326, the Despensers, father and son respectively, enjoyed incomes of £3,800 and £7,000, while Edmund's annual income was at only 2,355 marks (£1,570).

== Scotland and France ==
With domestic opposition largely neutralised, the king turned his attention to Scotland. A major campaign was organised in August, but the effort ended in total failure when the English were routed by the Scots, led by Robert the Bruce, at the Battle of Old Byland on 14 October 1322. Edward II himself had to flee the battlefield to avoid capture, and Edmund was with him as the royal army retreated to York. The king's inability to handle the Scottish situation was becoming apparent. Andrew Harclay, who had defeated Lancaster at Boroughbridge, and for this had been created Earl of Carlisle and appointed Warden of the Marches to Scotland, signed a peace treaty with the Scots without royal sanction in January 1323. When the king found out, he ordered Harclay's arrest. Edmund was one of the judges who passed judgement on Harclay, who was hanged, drawn and quartered for treason. With Harclay gone, Edmund was given responsibilities for the defence of the northern border, but the situation remained untenable. On 30 May 1323, Edmund was on the council that agreed to a thirteen-year truce with Scotland.

Meanwhile, the English king's possessions in France were coming under threat from the French king. Charles IV of France demanded that Edward again pay homage for his Duchy of Aquitaine,^{[f]} while at the same time threatening to confiscate the duchy under the pretext of a local dispute involving the priory at Saint-Sardos. In April 1324, Edmund and Alexander de Bicknor, Archbishop of Dublin, were sent to France on a diplomatic mission. While some historians have criticised Edmund for his failure to reach a diplomatic settlement, others have pointed to the difficult circumstances he faced, and how others had fared little better. When diplomacy failed, Edmund was appointed Edward's lieutenant in Aquitaine on 20 July 1324. Though there was a desperate need for reinforcements from England, these never arrived. In the short war that followed, the English lands were quickly overrun by the French, and Edmund was besieged at La Réole. Here he held out until 22 September, at which point he was forced to surrender and agree to a six-month truce.

== Deposition of Edward II ==
Edward II's refusal to pay homage to the French king was based on concern for his royal sovereignty, but also on fear of a potential resurgence of domestic resistance. For this reason, he sent his wife Isabella to negotiate with King Charles, who was her brother. The Queen departed for France on 9 March 1325, and in September she was joined by her son, the heir to the throne, Prince Edward. Isabella's negotiations were successful, and it was agreed that the young Prince Edward would perform homage in the king's place, which he did on 24 September. Not long after this, Edmund joined the queen and prince in Paris. A circle of opposition was emerging around the queen, including the exiled Roger Mortimer. Edmund, who had previously been steadfast in his support for his half-brother, now joined the plot against the king. Though he still distrusted Mortimer, his hatred for the Despensers seems to have been even greater at this point. When Edmund, along with the others, ignored the king's order to return to England, his lands were confiscated in March 1326.

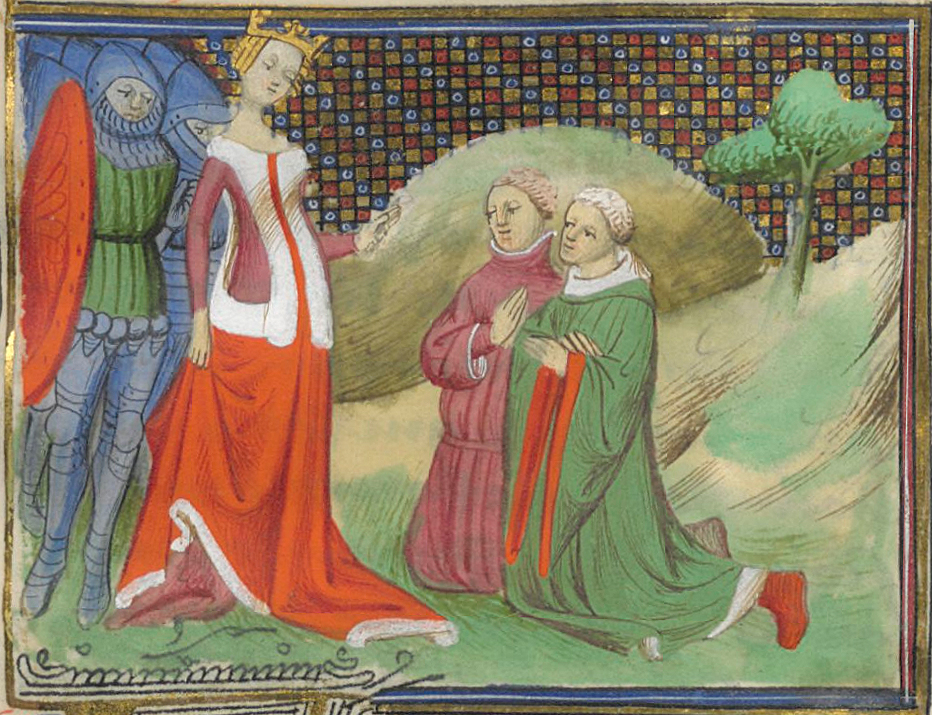
Queen Isabella with the captive Hugh Despenser the Elder and the Earl of Arundel. From a 15th-century manuscript.

In September, Isabella and Mortimer invaded England with mercenary soldiers, and Edmund took part in the invasion. The invasion won the support of a great part of the English nobility, including Edmund's brother Thomas, and Henry, Earl of Lancaster, Thomas of Lancaster's brother. Edmund took part in the trials of the two Despensers, and in the council transferring power to Prince Edward, who was crowned King Edward III. For his participation in the coup, Edmund received a reward of land belonging to the Despensers and the Earl of Arundel, who was also executed as a supporter of Edward II. As the Northern situation was still difficult, Edmund was given joint command of the Scottish Border with Lancaster, but the two fell out, and Lancaster was soon after given sole command. It did not take long for Edmund to grow disenchanted with the new regime; one source of contention was the dominant position at the court of Mortimer, who has been described as Isabella's lover. In the autumn of 1328, Edmund and his brother Thomas joined Henry of Lancaster in a conspiracy against Isabella and Mortimer. The conspiracy was a product of shared interest, however, rather than strong personal ties. Once it became clear that it would fail, the two brothers abandoned the venture.

== Death and aftermath ==
After participating in the planned rebellion, Edmund became less popular at court. He was still allowed to accompany the king's wife Philippa to her coronation in February 1330, but his appearances at court became less frequent. At this point he became involved in another plot against the court, when he was convinced by rumours that his brother was still alive.^{[g]} It later emerged that Roger Mortimer himself was responsible for leading Edmund into this belief, in a form of entrapment. The plot was revealed, and in the parliament of March 1330 Edmund was indicted and condemned to death as a traitor. Upon hearing that the verdict was death, the condemned earl pleaded with Edward III for his life, offering to walk from Winchester to London with a rope around his neck as a sign of atonement, but leniency was blocked by Mortimer and the queen. It was almost impossible to find anyone willing to perform the execution of a man of royal blood, until a convicted murderer (who was said to be responsible "for cleaning the latrines") eventually beheaded Edmund in exchange for a pardon. Edmund's body was initially buried in a Franciscan church in Winchester, but it was removed to Westminster Abbey in 1331.

The execution of a royal prince was a great provocation to the seventeen-year-old Edward III, who had not been involved in the decision, and it probably contributed to the king's decision to rise up against his protector. In October 1330, Edward III carried out a coup installing himself in personal control of the government, and Mortimer was executed. Among the charges against Mortimer was that of procuring Edmund's death, and the charges against the late Earl of Kent were annulled. In late 1325, Edmund had married Margaret Wake, sister of Thomas Wake, Baron Wake of Liddell, and the couple had several children. His lands and titles descended on his oldest son by the same name, but this Edmund himself died in October 1331. The earldom then passed to the younger son John.

Edmund was not particularly popular while he was alive, nor did he enjoy a good reputation after his death. His unreliability in political issues, and repeated shifts in allegiance, might have contributed to this. His household was also said to behave in a way that caused popular resentment, taking provisions as they passed through the countryside while offering little compensation. At the same time, it has been pointed out that Edmund showed a great deal of loyalty to Edward II, in spite of receiving relatively little rewards and recognition from his brother.

=== Children ===
Name	Birth date	Death date	Notes
Edmund, 2nd Earl of Kent	1326	bef. 5 October 1331	
Margaret of Kent	1327	1352	Was to marry Arnaud Amanieu d'Albret, but the plans fell through.
Joan of Kent	28 September 1328	7 August 1385	Known as "The Fair Maid of Kent". Married Thomas Holland, 1st Earl of Kent, and later Edward the Black Prince, son of Edward III.
John, 3rd Earl of Kent	7 April 1330	26 December 1352	

== Fictional portrayals ==
Edmund is a character in Christopher Marlowe's play Edward II.

Edmund is a supporting character in Maurice Druon's The Accursed Kings (Les Rois maudits in French) novels. He is portrayed as being reluctantly being drawn into the conspiracy against his brother by his relatives in France, only to regret it later when he is sidelined in the regency council. In this fictionalised version, his extrajudicial murder is a power-play arranged by Roger Mortimer because he believes that young Edward will replace Mortimer with his uncles as soon as he comes of age. In the 1972 television adaptation, Edmund was portrayed by Eric Kruger, but he did not appear in the 2005 adaptation.

== Ancestry ==
Ancestors of Edmund of Woodstock, 1st Earl of Kent

8. John, King of England
4. Henry III of England
9. Isabella of Angoulême
2. Edward I of England
10. Ramon Berenguer V, Count of Provence
5. Eleanor of Provence
11. Beatrice of Savoy
1. Edmund, 1st Earl of Kent
12. Louis IX of France
6. Philip III of France
13. Margaret of Provence (Sister of 5)
3. Margaret of France
14. Henry III, Duke of Brabant
7. Maria of Brabant
15. Adelaide of Burgundy

== Notes ==
a. A detailed account of the children of Edward I can be found in Michael Prestwich's biography of the king.

== Bibliography ==
- Barrow, G. W. S. (1965). Robert Bruce and the Community of the Realm of Scotland. London: Eyre & Spottiswoode. ISBN 9780748620227.
- Denholm–Young, Noël (1969). The Country Gentry in the Fourteenth Century: With Special Reference to the Heraldic Rolls of Arms. Oxford: Clarendon. ISBN 0198223013.
- Given-Wilson, Chris (1996). The English Nobility in the Late Middle Ages. London: Routledge. ISBN 0415148839.
- Haines, Roy Martin (2003). King Edward II: Edward of Caernarfon, His Life, His Reign, and Its Aftermath, 1284–1330. Montreal, London: McGill-Queens University Press. ISBN 9780773524323.
- Lawne, Penny (2010). "Edmund of Woodstock, Earl of Kent (1301–1330): a study of personal loyalty". In Chris Given-Wilson (ed.). Fourteenth Century England VI. Boydell & Brewer. pp. 27–48. ISBN 9781843835301.
- Marshall, Alison (2006). "The childhood and household of Edward II's half-brothers, Thomas of Brotherton and Edmund of Woodstock". In Gwilym Dodd; Anthony Musson (eds.). The Reign of Edward II: New Perspectives. Boydell & Brewer. pp. 190–204. ISBN 9781903153192.
- McKisack, May (1959). The Fourteenth Century: 1307–1399. Oxford: Oxford University Press. ISBN 0198217129.
- Maddicot, J.R. (1970). Thomas of Lancaster, 1307–1322. Oxford: Oxford University Press. ISBN 0198218370. OCLC 132766.
- Phillips, J.R.S. (1972). Aymer de Valence, Earl of Pembroke 1307–1324. Oxford: Oxford University Press. ISBN 0198223595. OCLC 426691.
- Powicke, Maurice; E.B. Fryde (1961). Handbook of British Chronology (2nd ed.). London: Royal Historical Society.
- Prestwich, Michael (1980). The Three Edwards: War and State in England 1272–1377. London: Weidenfeld and Nicolson. ISBN 0297777300. OCLC 185679701.
- Prestwich, Michael (1997) [1988]. Edward I (updated ed.). New Haven: Yale University Press. ISBN 0300072090.
- Prestwich, Michael (2007). Plantagenet England: 1225-1360 (new ed.). Oxford: Oxford University Press. ISBN 978-0198228448.
- Tuck, Anthony (1985). Crown and Nobility 1272-1461: Political Conflict in Late Medieval England. London: Fontana. ISBN 0006860842.
- Waugh, Scott L. (2004). "Edmund, first earl of Kent (1301–1330)". Oxford Dictionary of National Biography. Oxford: Oxford University Press. doi:10.1093/ref:odnb/8506.

Political offices
Preceded by Hugh le Despenser	Lord Warden of the Cinque Ports; 1321–1323	Succeeded by Sir John Peche
Peerage of England
New creation	Earl of Kent; 5th creation 1321–1330	Succeeded by Edmund
