= Edmund, 2nd Earl of Kent =

Member of the English royal family (c. 1326–1331)

Edmund

Earl of Kent
- Reign: 1331
- Predecessor: Edmund of Woodstock, 1st Earl of Kent
- Successor: John, 3rd Earl of Kent
- Born: c. 1326
- Died: 5 October 1331
- House: Plantagenet
- Father: Edmund of Woodstock, 1st Earl of Kent
- Mother: Margaret Wake, 3rd Baroness Wake of Liddell

Edmund, 2nd Earl of Kent (c. 1326 – 5 October 1331) was a member of the English royal family.

== Life ==
He inherited the Earldom of Kent in 1331, a year after his father, Edmund of Woodstock, 1st Earl of Kent, was attainted. His mother was Margaret Wake, 3rd Baroness Wake of Liddell. In 1330 he was, on the petition of his mother and the reversal of his father's condemnation, recognised as Earl of Kent. He died very soon after, aged just 5, and was succeeded by his 1-year-old brother, John, 3rd Earl of Kent. He in turn died aged 22, and the Earldom of Kent was held in abeyance by their sister, Joan of Kent. In a separate creation of the Earldom of Kent, her first husband was created Earl of Kent.

== Ancestry ==
Ancestors of Edmund, 2nd Earl of Kent

16. John of England
8. Henry III of England
17. Isabella of Angoulême
4. Edward I of England
18. Ramon Berenguer IV, Count of Provence
9. Eleanor of Provence
19. Beatrice of Savoy
2. Edmund of Woodstock, 1st Earl of Kent
20. Louis IX of France
10. Philip III of France
21. Marguerite of Provence
5. Margaret of France
22. Henry III, Duke of Brabant
11. Maria of Brabant
23. Adelaide of Burgundy
1. Edmund, 2nd Earl of Kent
24. Hugh Wake
12. Baldwin Wake (d. 1282)
25. Joan de Stuteville
6. John Wake, 1st Baron Wake of Liddell
26. Robert de Quincy (d. 1257)
13. Hawise de Quincy (1250?–1295?)
27. Elen ferch Llywelyn
3. Margaret Wake
28. Enguerrand II de Fiennes
14. William de Fenes
29. Isabelle de Conde
7. Joan Fiennes
30. John II of Brienne
15. Blanche de Brienne
31. Jeanne of Chateaudun

== Notes ==
Peerage of England
Preceded by Edmund of Woodstock	Earl of Kent; 1331	Succeeded by John
