= John, 3rd Earl of Kent =

English nobleman (1330–1352)

John

Earl of Kent
- Reign: 1331–1352
- Predecessor: Edmund, 2nd Earl of Kent
- Successor: Joan of Kent
- Born: 7 April 1330; Arundel Castle, Sussex, England
- Died: 26 December 1352 (aged 22)
- Burial: Church of Greyfriars, Winchester
- Spouse: Isabella of Julich
- Father: Edmund of Woodstock, 1st Earl of Kent
- Mother: Margaret Wake, 3rd Baroness Wake of Liddell

John (7 April 1330 – 26 December 1352), an English nobleman, was the Earl of Kent (1331–1352) and 4th Baron Wake of Liddell (1349–1352). His promising career was cut short by an untimely death at the age of twenty-two.

== Life ==
John was born on 7 April 1330 at Arundel Castle in Sussex, the youngest son and posthumous child of Edmund of Woodstock, Earl of Kent, and Margaret Wake. He was thus a grandson of Edward I and cousin of Edward III. John's father was executed for treason on 19 March 1330 by the orders of Roger Mortimer, 1st Earl of March just three weeks before his birth. Upon Edward III taking control of government the attainder of his father was reversed and his elder brother Edmund inherited the earldom. Upon Edmund's death in October 1331, John succeeded to the title as an infant. His heir throughout his life was his elder sister, Joan.

John took part in the campaign that culminated in the battle of Crécy in 1346. He was probably in the retinue of Duke Henry of Lancaster, although he may not have been present at Crécy itself. Contemporary witnesses make no record of his military exploits, if any there were. In 1347 the king granted him his entire inheritance, making him independent of his mother at the age of seventeen. He owned estates, including 43 manors and 30 advowsons, in seventeen counties, as well as various rents and knight's fees in a further six counties. His annual income was over £6,000 at a time when £1,000 was considered sufficient to maintain the lifestyle of an earl.

On 3 April 1348, John married, by Papal dispensation, Isabella (also known as Elizabeth, born c. 1330, died 6 June 1411), daughter of William V, Duke of Jülich, and Joanna. In 1349 John's uncle, Thomas Wake, 2nd Baron of Liddell, died childless and his estates passed to his sister, John's mother. Margaret died of the plague within a few months and John inherited both her dower lands and Thomas's estate. He took possession in February 1350. John received livery of all his lands from the king on 10 April 1351, having come of age three days earlier.

In 1352, John's sister Joan gave birth to a son, John Holland, named after his uncle, who probably served as his godfather. John's own marriage to Isabella remained childless. John was at his favourite manor in Woking, when, on 23 December 1352, he granted the manor of Ryhall to Bartholomew de Burghersh. Shortly after, he fell ill. He did not recover and died on 26 December 1352. He was buried next to his father in the church of Greyfriars at Winchester. His titles passed to his only surviving sister Joan who became the 4th Countess of Kent, and the 5th Baroness Wake of Liddell suo jure. John's widow was still being titled Countess of Kent, however, as late as 1396. She entered Waverley Abbey after John's death, and before her own death she requested that she be buried next to him at Greyfriars. On Michaelmas 1360 she was remarried in Wingham, Kent to Eustace d'Aubrichecourt. With him she had a son, William.

Peerage of England
Preceded by Edmund	Earl of Kent; 1331–1352	Succeeded by Joan of Kent
Preceded by Margaret Wake	Baron Wake of Liddell; 1349–1352	Succeeded by Joan of Kent
