= Millstone =

Stones used in gristmills, for grinding wheat or other grains

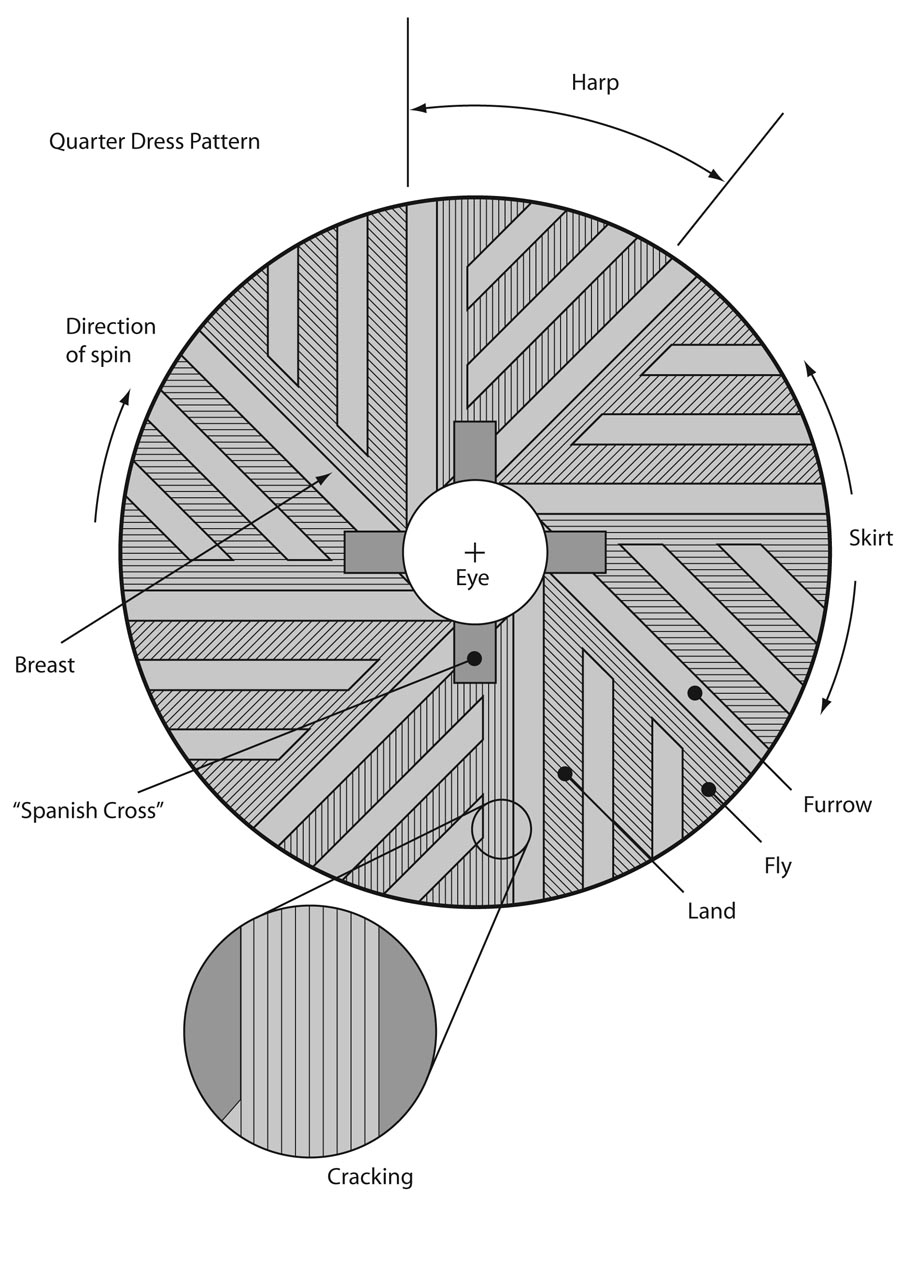
The basic anatomy of a millstone. This is a runner stone; a bedstone would not have the "Spanish Cross" into which the supporting millrind fits.

Millstones or mill stones are stones used in gristmills, used for triturating, crushing or, more specifically, grinding wheat or other grains. They are sometimes referred to as grindstones or grinding stones.

Millstones come in pairs: a stationary base with a convex rim known as the bedstone (or nether millstone) and a concave-rimmed runner stone that rotates. The movement of the runner on top of the bedstone creates a "scissoring" action that grinds grain trapped between the stones. Millstones are constructed so that their shape and configuration help to channel ground flour to the outer edges of the mechanism for collection.

The runner stone is supported by a cross-shaped metal piece (millrind or rynd) fixed to a "mace head" topping the main shaft or spindle leading to the driving mechanism of the mill (wind, water (including tide), or other means).

== History ==
=== The origins of an industry ===
Often referred to as the "oldest industry", the use of the millstone is inextricably linked to human history. Integrated into food processes since the Upper Palaeolithic, its use remained constant until the end of the 19th century, when it was gradually replaced by a new type of metal tool. However, it can still be seen in rural domestic installations, such as in India, where 300 million women used hand mills daily to produce flour in 2002.

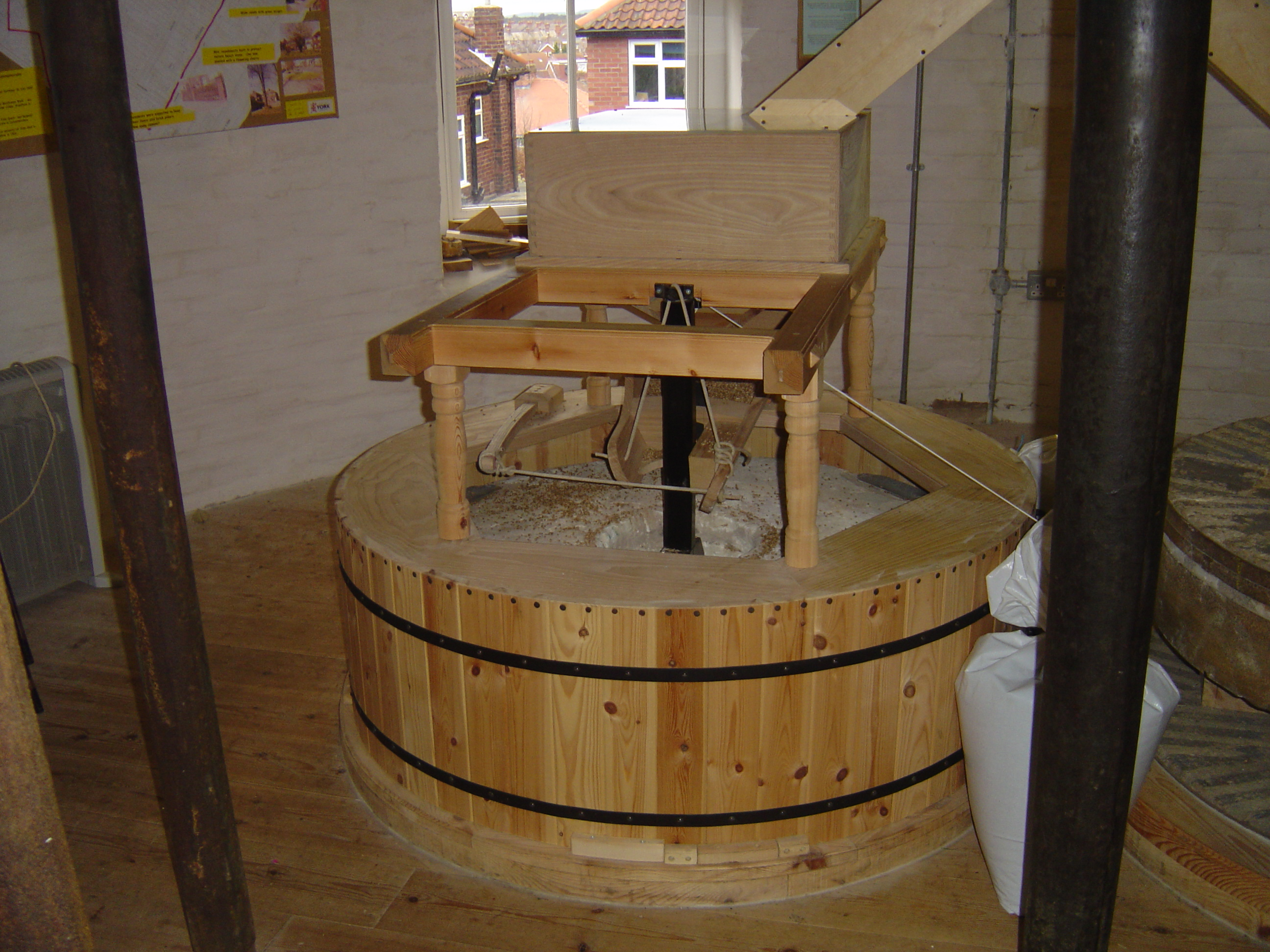
A pair of millstones in Holgate Windmill

The earliest evidence for stones used to grind food is found in northern Australia, at the Madjedbebe rock shelter in Arnhem Land, dating back around 60,000 years. Grinding stones or grindstones, as they were called, were used by the Aboriginal peoples across the continent and islands, and they were traded in areas where suitable sandstone was not available in abundance. Different stones were adapted for grinding different things and varied according to location. One important use was for foods, in particular to grind seeds to make bread, but stones were also adapted for grinding specific types of starchy nuts, ochres for artwork, plant fibres for string, or plants for use in bush medicine, and are still used today. The Australian grindstones usually comprise a large flat sandstone rock (for its abrasive qualities), used with a top stone, known as a "muller", "pounder", or pestle. The Aboriginal peoples of the present state of Victoria used grinding stones to crush roots, bulbs, tubers, and berries, as well as insects, small mammals, and reptiles before cooking them.

=== In Ancient history ===
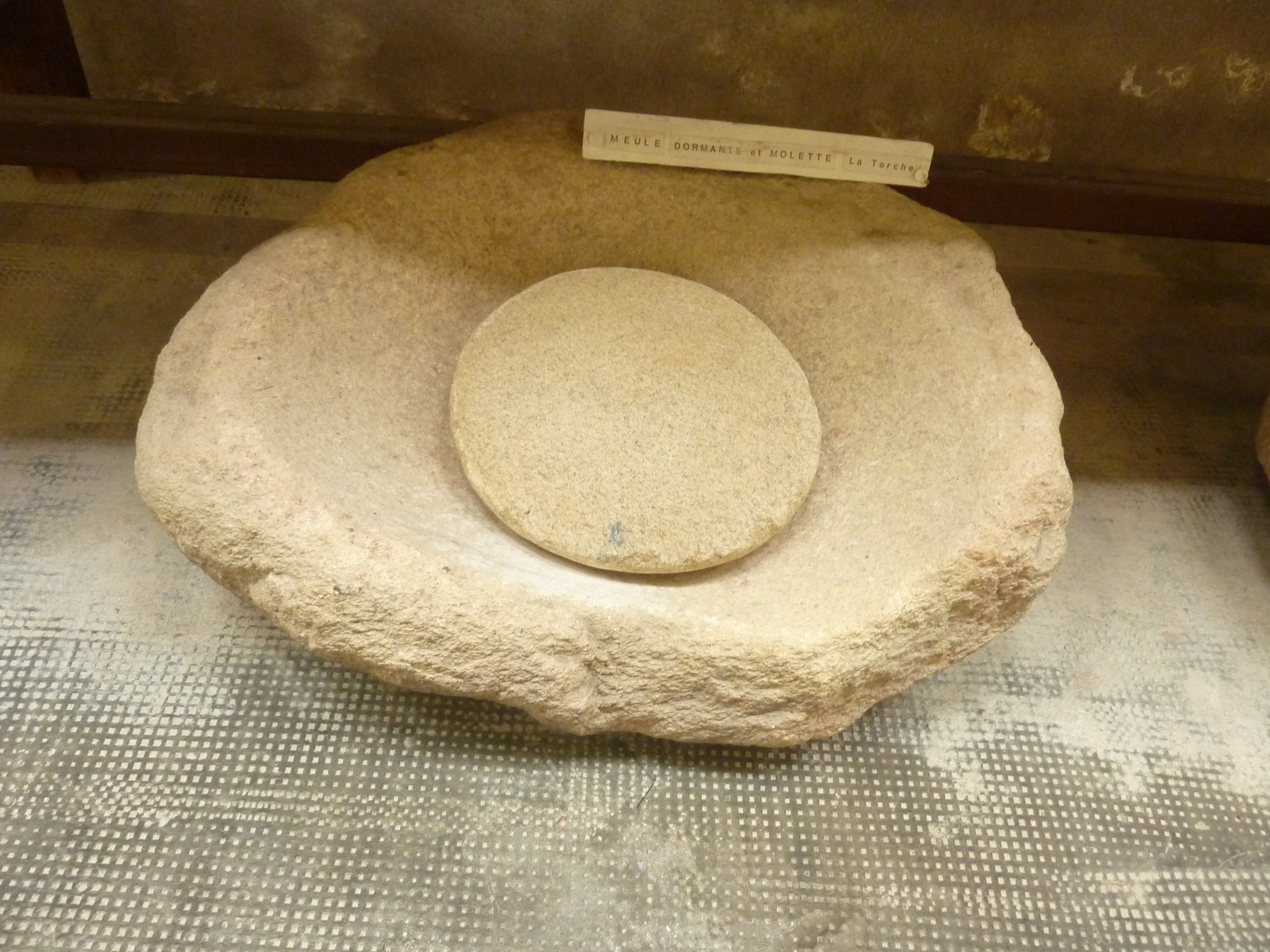
Nether millstone and knurling wheel found at the La Torche site (Plomeur)

Careful examination of Paleolithic grinders (pebbles, wheels, mortar and pestle, etc.) enables us to determine the nature of the action exerted on the material and the gesture performed; the function of the tool can then be specified, as well as the activity in which it participated.

Neanderthal people were already using rudimentary tools to crush various substances, as attested by the presence of rudimentary grinders at the end of the Mousterian and millstones in the Châtelperronian. From the Aurignacian period onwards (around 38,000 years ago), Cro-Magnon man regularly used millstones, elongated grinders, and circular wheels. From the Gravettian period onwards (circa 29,000 years), this equipment became more diversified, with the appearance of new types of tools such as millstones and pestle grinders.

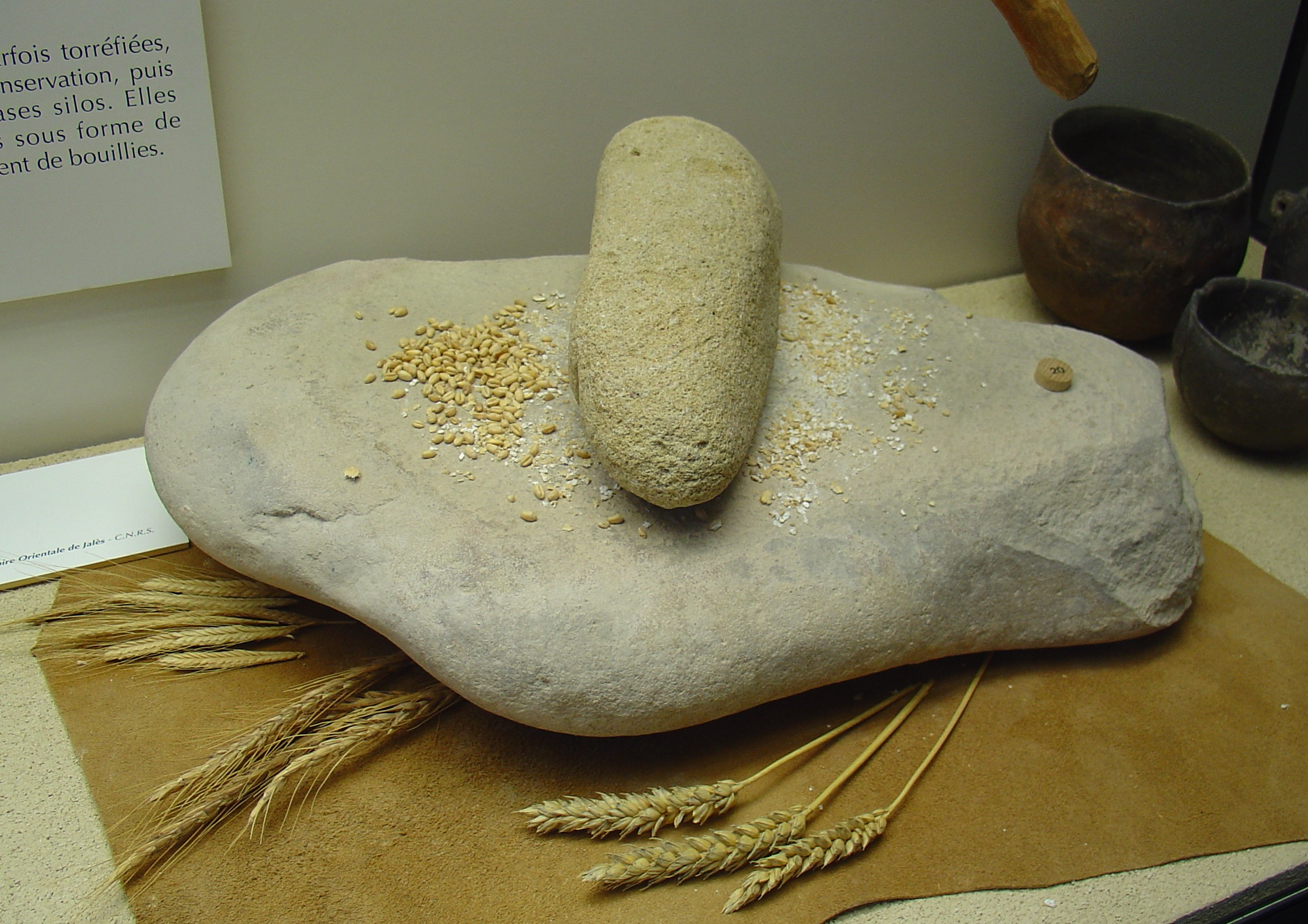
Neolithic millstone and grinder

At the end of the Palaeolithic, millstones from Wadi Kubbaniya (Middle East, 19,000 B.C.) were involved in dietary processes and associated with residues of tuberous plants, which were known to require grinding before consumption, either to extract their toxins (Cyperus rotundus, nutsedge), or to remove the fibrous texture that would make them indigestible (Scirpus maritimus). The rhizomes of ferns and the peel of the fruit of the doum palm, also found on this site, benefit from being ground to improve their nutritional qualities; they thus complemented the meat diet of hunter-gatherers. Grinding barley or oat seeds was practiced at the end of the Upper Palaeolithic (Franchthi) or the Kebarian (Ohalo II, 19,000 BC).

As tools improved, the material was increasingly finely ground, but only when it became a real powder could we speak of grinding. Thus, the men of the European Upper Paleolithic were already dissociating grinding and milling, as attested by the appearance at this time of the first grinding slabs used with grinders or millstones. While there is no evidence of the milling of wild cereals in the early Upper Paleolithic, at least in Europe, there is no reason not to believe that other plant matter (acorns, nuts, hazelnuts, etc.) and animal matter (fat) were already being ground into paste before cooking. Similarly, it's likely that millstones were being used at this time for technical purposes, to crush mineral substances (dyes) and certain plant or animal fibers for technical use.

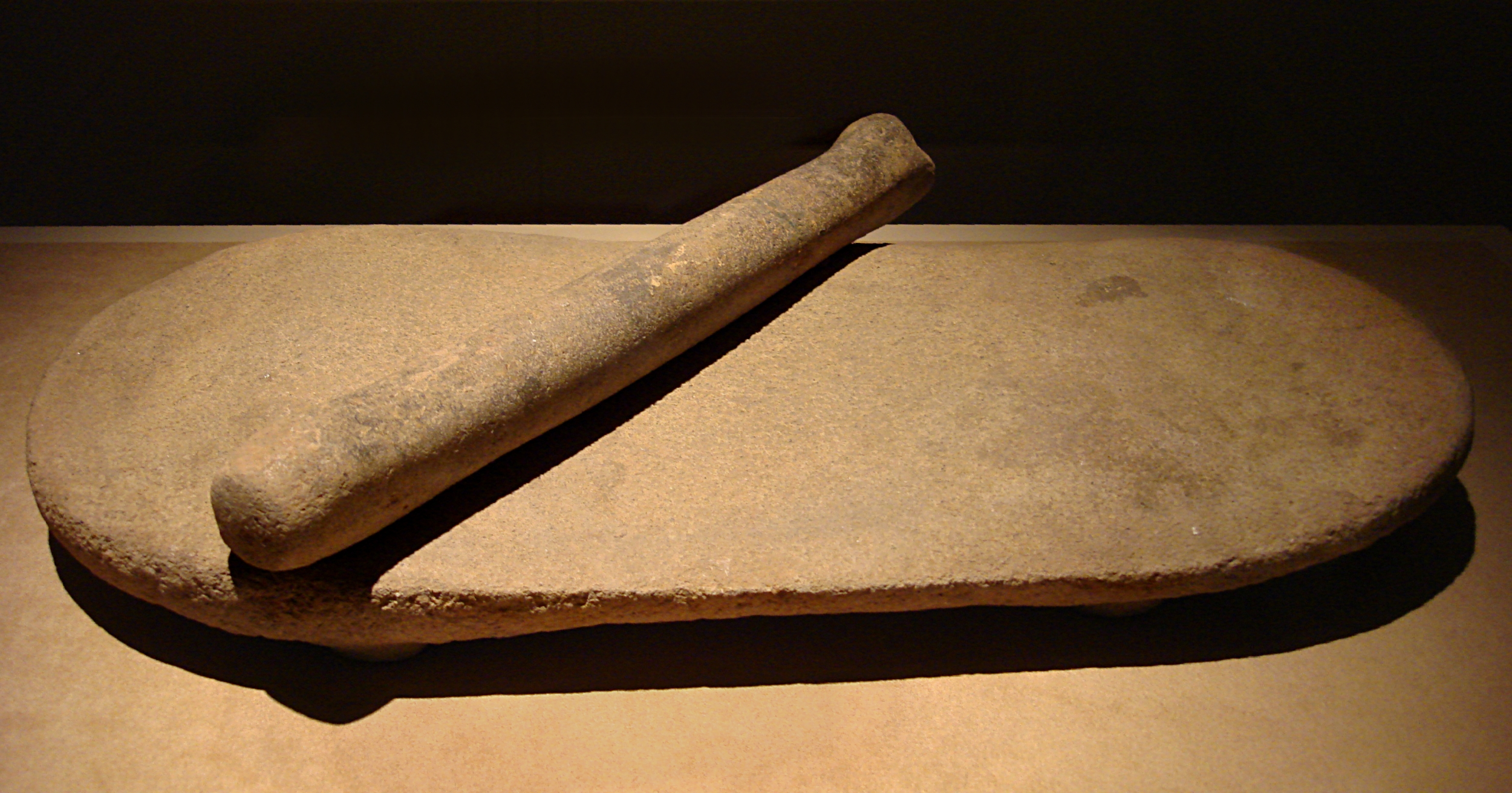
Stone-grinding slab with grinding roller Peiligang culture (5500 - 5000 B.C.), Xinzheng

In the Mesolithic and Neolithic eras, with the domestication of plants, much larger, fully formed grinding, pounding, and milling equipment appeared. From the Natufian onwards, several types of millstones can be found side by side, such as the deep "trough-shaped" millstone or the flat millstone, indicating a specialization of their function. In the Near East, the pestle-grinder began to be developed in the Kebarian and Natufian periods. It gradually evolved into the heavy, generally wooden, thrown pestle. This type of equipment is still used today in many regions, such as in Ethiopia for milling millet.

The appearance of flat, elongated millstones in the Natoufian period (Abu Hureïra on the Euphrates) dates back to the 9th millennium BC. They feature larger active surfaces and mark the emergence of a new gesture, that of grinding from front to back, with both hands, which implies a new posture for the body, kneeling in front of the millstone. The appearance of large, asymmetrical, shaped millstones (Mureybet, Sheikh Hassan, circa 10,000 BP) led to the "saddle-shaped" millstones still known today as the metate.

=== In the rest of the world ===
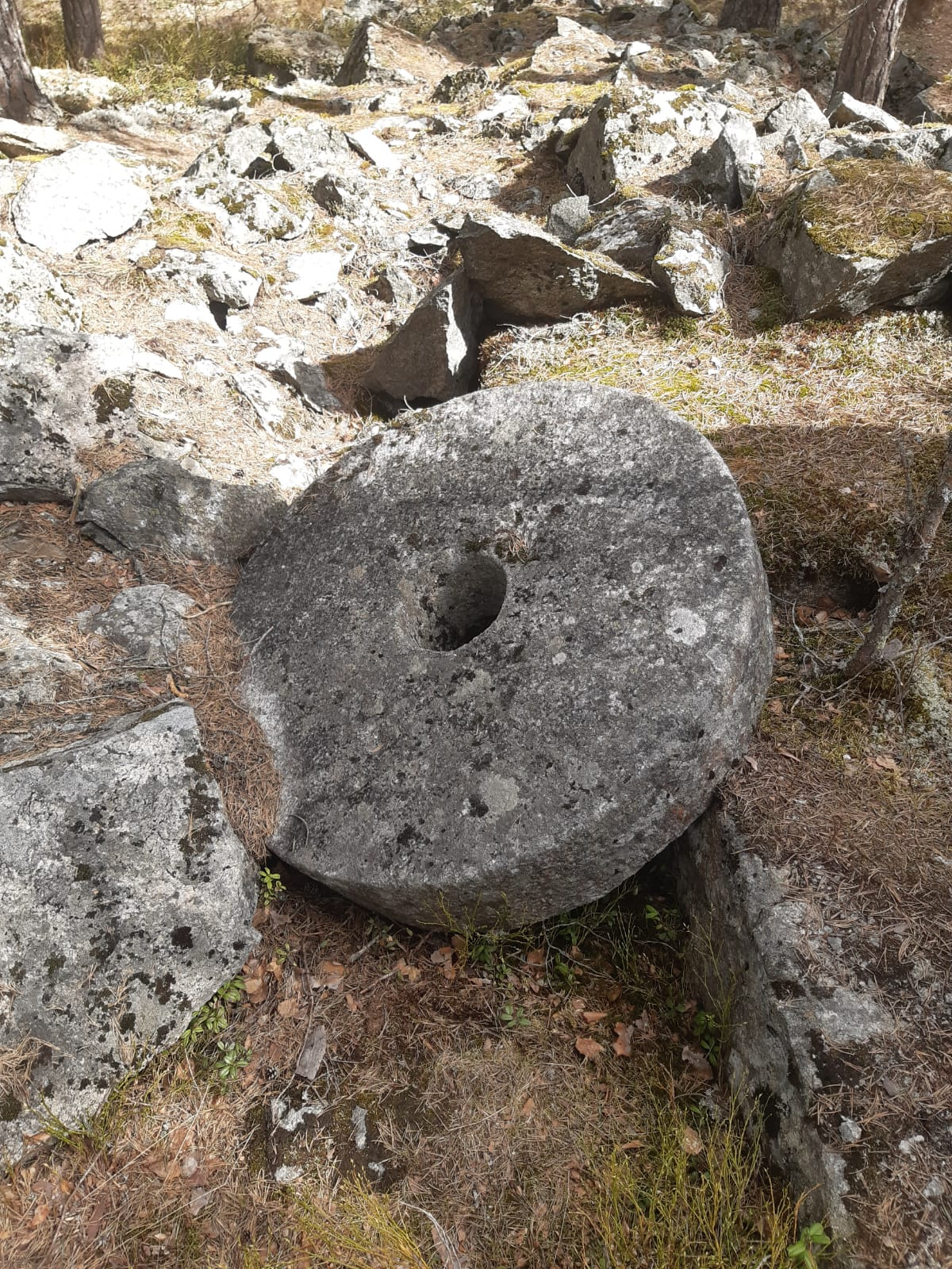
Millstone factory site in Finland

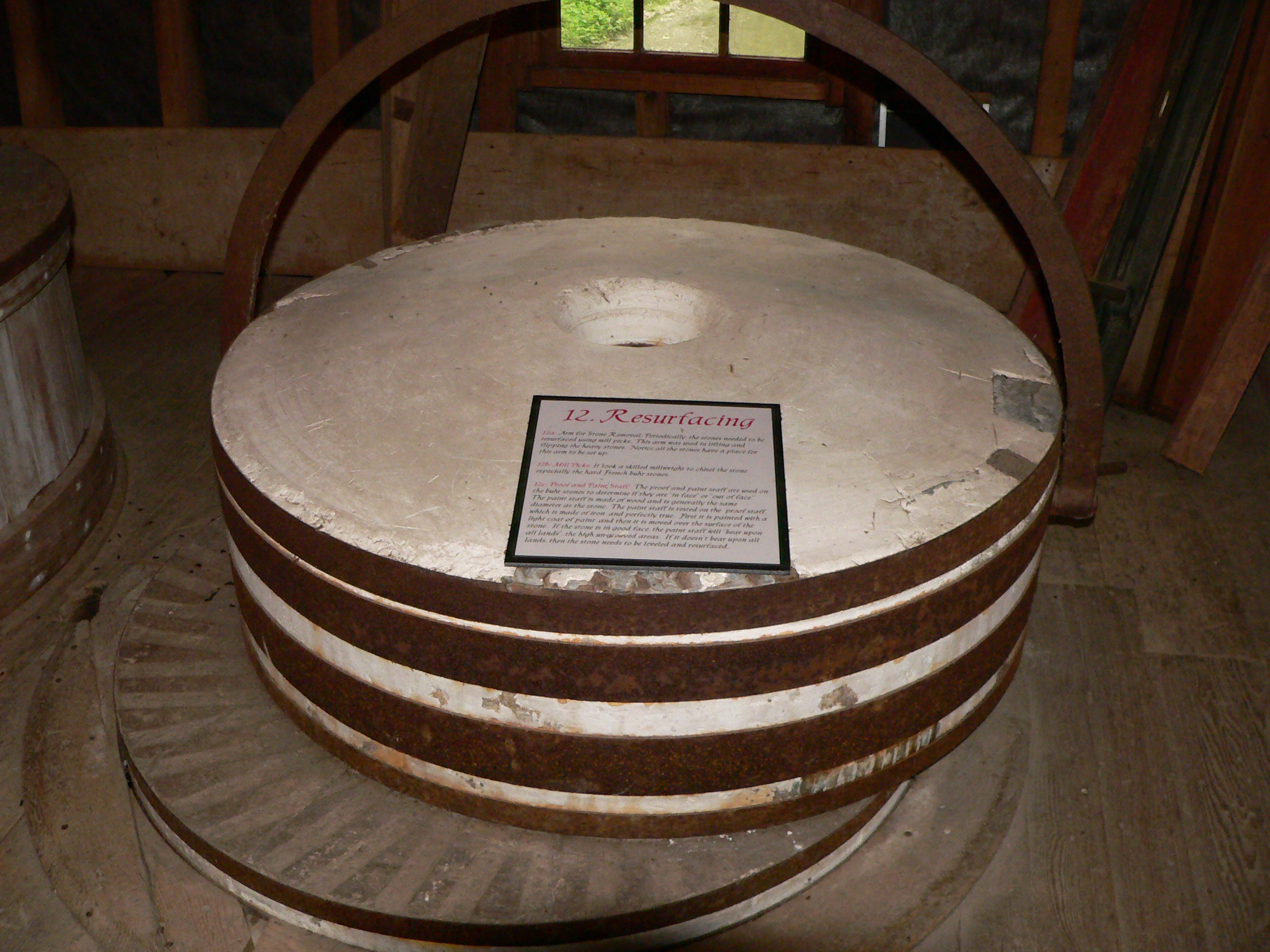
Buhr stone with resurfacing instructions

At the Tell Abu Hureyra archaeological site, as early as the 8th millennium BC, women's skeletons show traces of osteoarthritis in the knees, spinal deformity and deformation of the first metatarsal, pathologies associated with long periods of bending while grinding, supporting the theory that early humans practiced a sexual division of labor. In India, millstone (Chakki) were used to grind grains and spices. These consist of a stationary stone cylinder upon which a smaller stone cylinder rotates. Smaller ones, for household use, were operated by two people. Larger ones, for community or commercial use, used livestock to rotate the upper cylinder. Today a majority of the stone flour mills (Atta Chakki) are equipped with lower stone rotating and upper stone stationary millstones also called Shikhar Emery Stones which are made from abrasive emery grains and grits, with a binding agent similar to Sorel Cement. These stones are made from two types of emery abrasives - Natural Jaspar Red Emery or Synthetic Calcined Bauxite Black Emery.

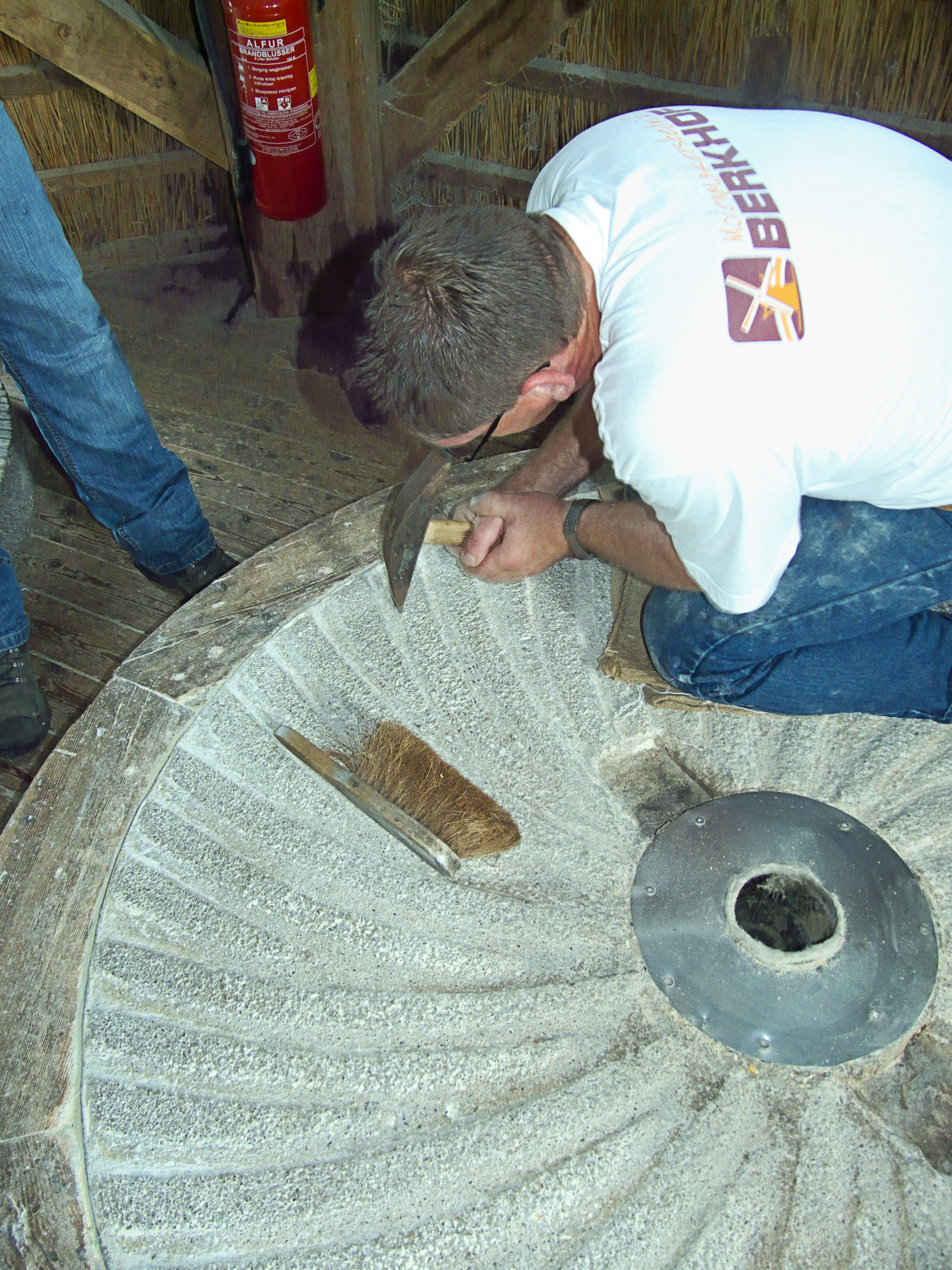
Dressing a millstone

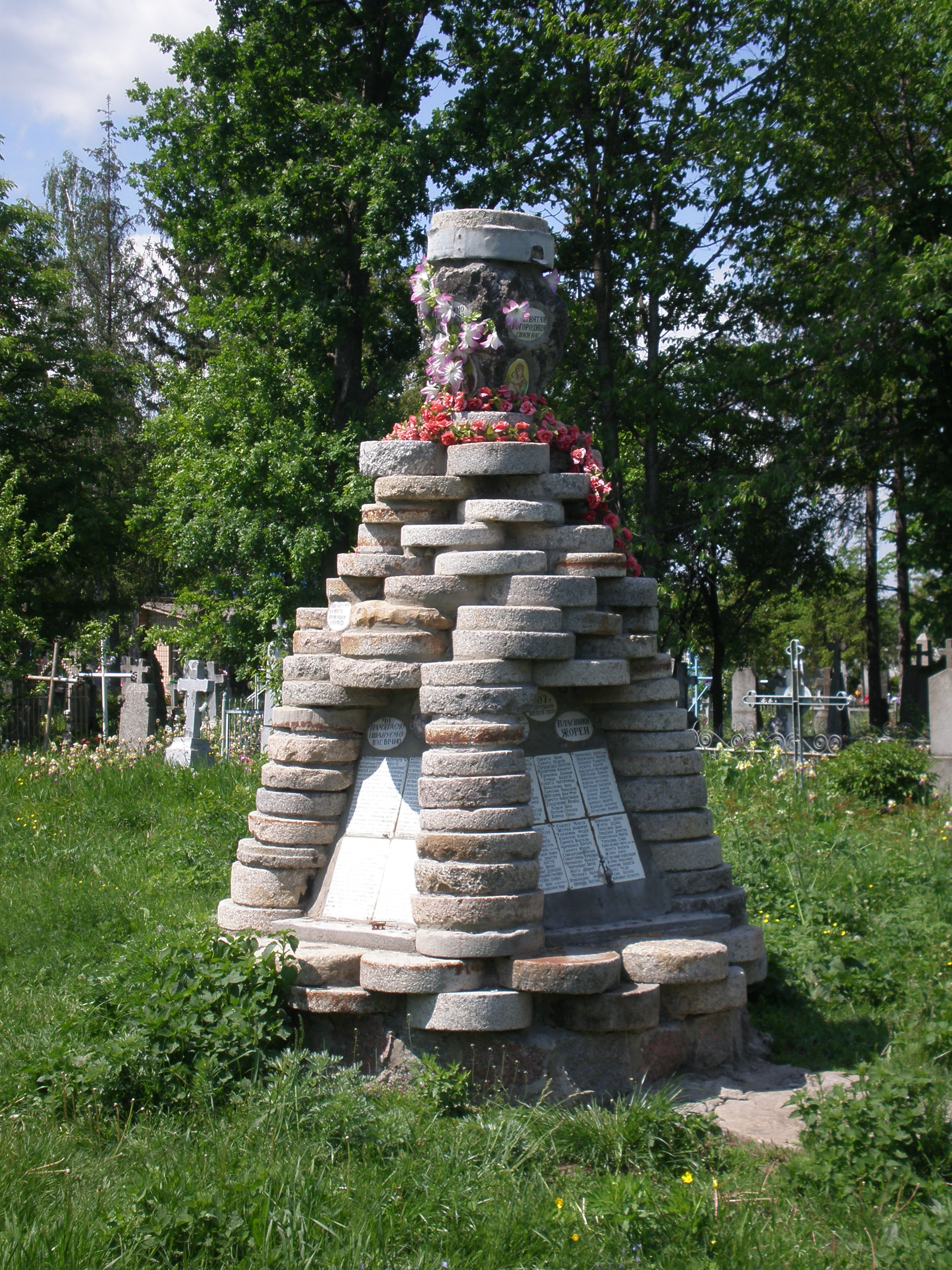
Monument in the village of Victorivka (Вікторівка) in memory of the victims of the man-made famine known as Holodomor. The monument is made from millstones that the villagers hid and used in secret, as the Soviet authorities had prohibited their use during the famine.

In Korea, there were three different millstones, each made from different materials, serving other purposes, such as threshing, grinding, and producing starch. Generally, the handle of a millstone in Korea was made from an ash tree, the process for making a handle from the ash tree was known as "Mulpure-namu". To ensure that everything is "all right" with the creation of a millstone, a mason within ancient Korea offered food and alcohol in a ritual.

Millstones were introduced to Britain by the Romans during the 1st century AD and were widely used there from the 3rd century AD onwards.

In 1932–1933 in Ukraine, during the man-made famine known as Holodomor, the Soviet authorities prohibited the use of millstones, claiming that a millstone is a "mechanism for enrichment" (which was a negative term in Soviet communist ideology). This forced Ukrainian villagers to hide their manually operated millstones and use them secretly during the famine. In response, Soviet authorities regularly searched villages for "illegal" millstones and destroyed them. In 2007, the people of Victorivka village in Cherkasy Oblast built a monument using the millstones they had managed to hide and save from the Soviet plunder during the Holodomor.

== Different techniques: grinding, crushing, milling ==
The preparation of vegetable products (roots, tubers, almonds, leaves, etc.), animal products (marrow, tendons, etc.), or mineral products (ochre) by grinding or milling, for consumption or technical use, has existed for several dozen millennia. Unlike crushing, in which a hard envelope such as a shell or bone is broken open to recover its contents, in this case, the aim is to reduce a much softer material to a powder or paste.

Depending on the place and time, millstones were used for "dry" grinding: in the manufacture of flour, sugar, or spices, but also for the preparation of kaolinite, cement, phosphate, lime, enamel, fertilizer, and other minerals. The milling operation can also be carried out "wet", as in the case of durum wheat semolina, nixtamal, or the grinding of mustard seeds. During preparation, some raw materials produce a naturally fluid paste, as in olive crushing or cocoa grinding.

In his typology of percussion, André Leroi-Gourhan defines several families of gestures, three of which are essential for the preparation of raw materials:

1. Crushing gestures involve vertical percussion using a heavy, elongated object in the manner of the African pestle. This gesture is also used by the trip hammer to make paper pulp, or in forging;
2. Milling gestures, using percussion, which are performed in a circular, disordered, or back-and-forth motion on a millstone;
3. Grinding gestures, in which the movements are roughly circular and occasionally vertical, thus combining a thrown percussion and a percussion posed, are qualified here as diffuse. This is the case with the contemporary mortar-pestle system.
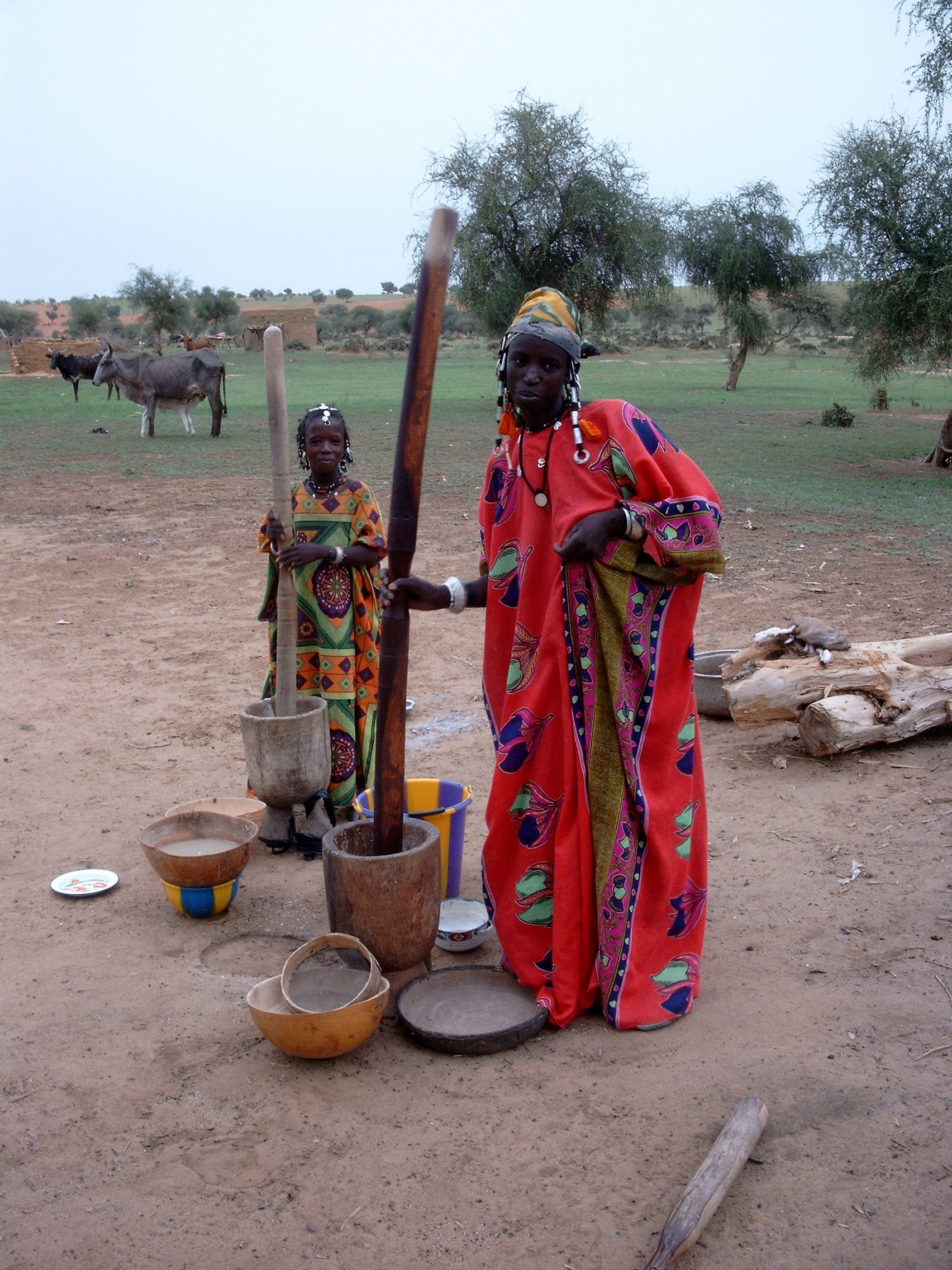
Pilon: Vertical percussive crushing

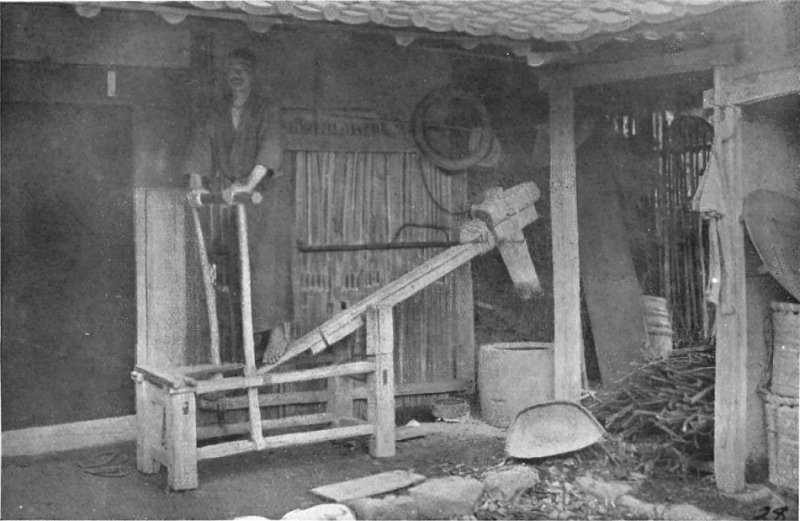
Crushing by hammering

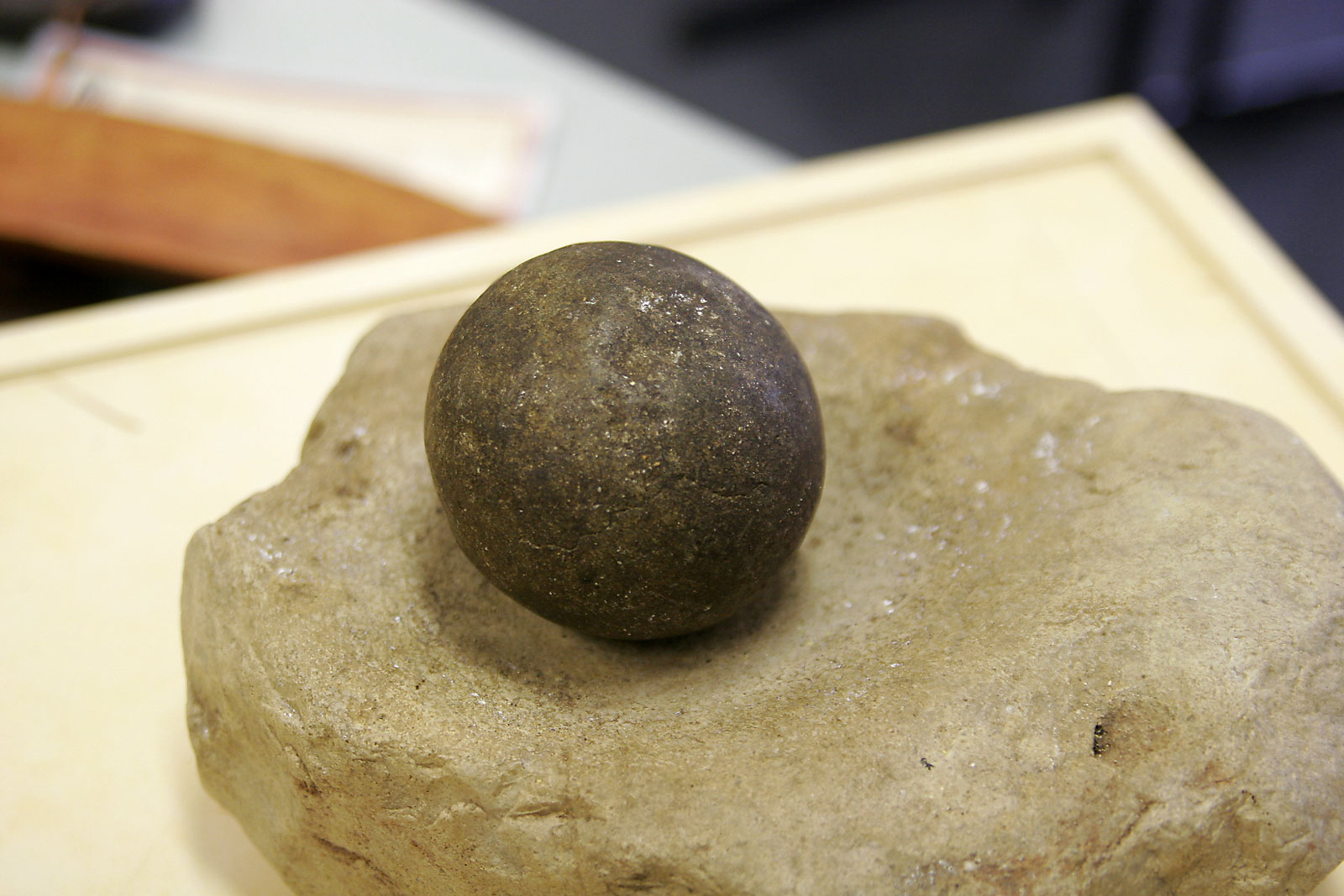
Monolithic millstone with knurled wheel: percussive milling with uncoordinated movements

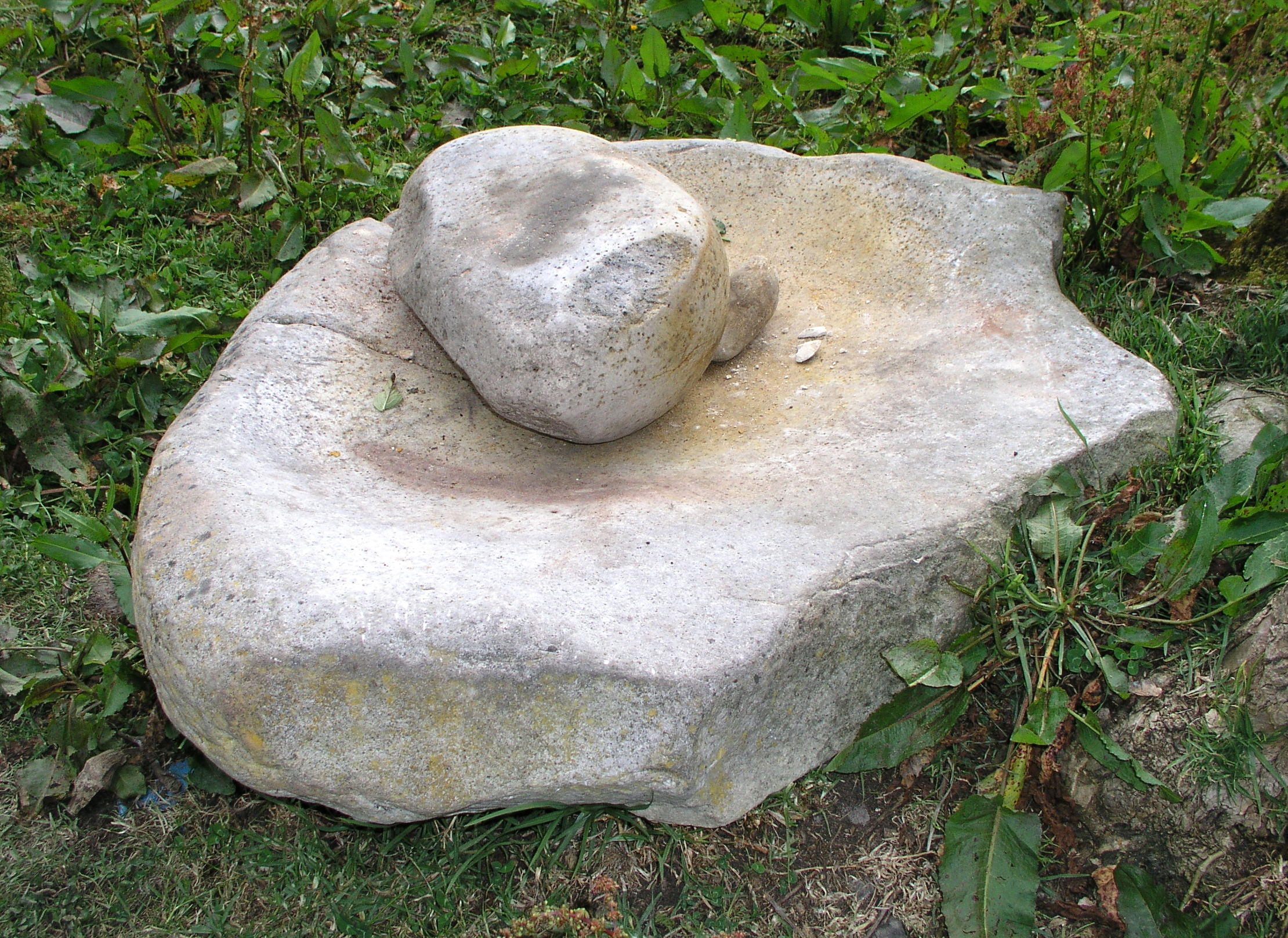
Peruvian Stone Batán (sandstone): Percussive milling

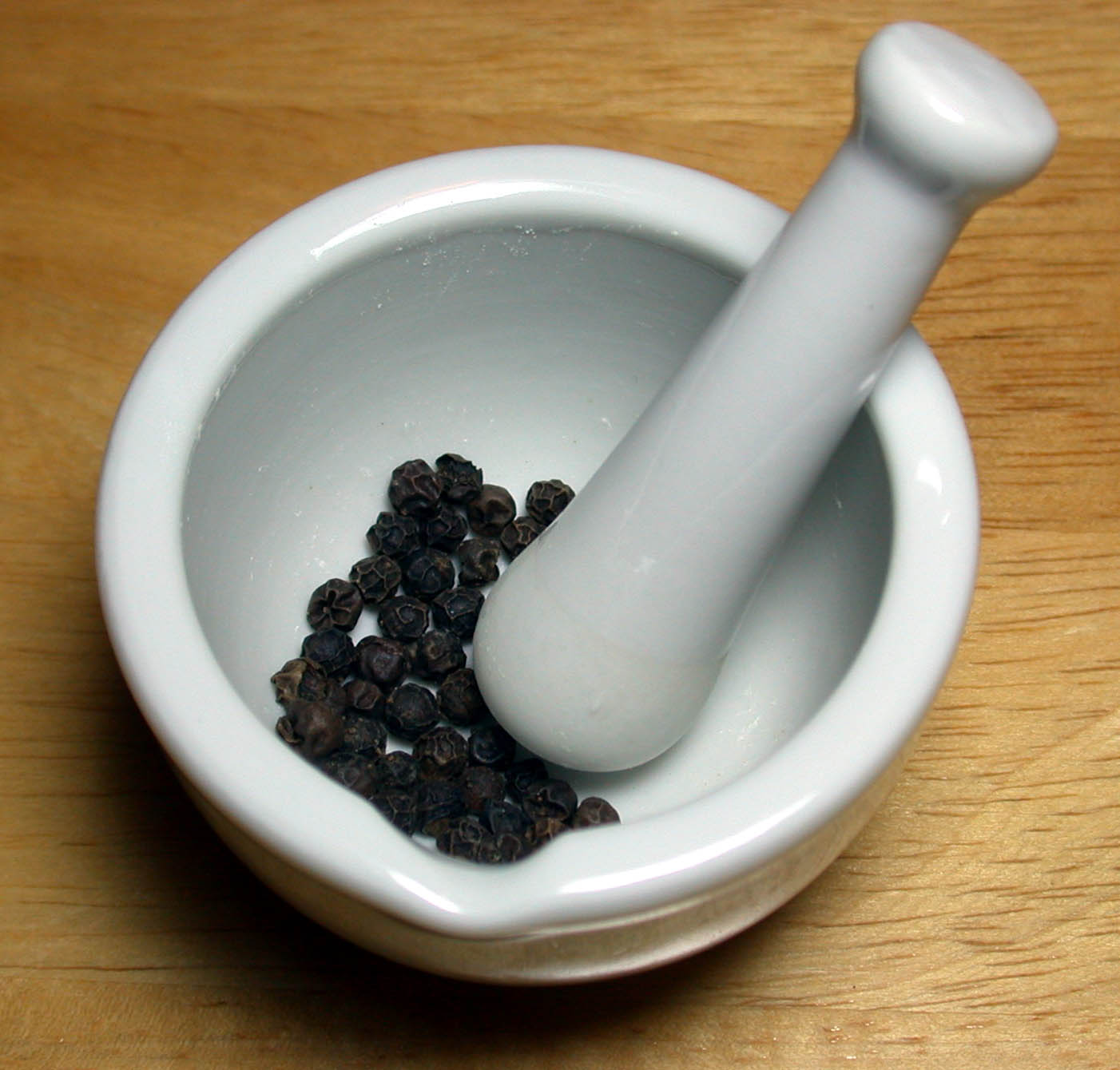
Mortar and pestle: Grinding by diffused percussive impact and diffused percussive application

== Milling systems ==
Until the invention of the watermill, mills operated using "strength-powered", i.e. the force of animals or people.

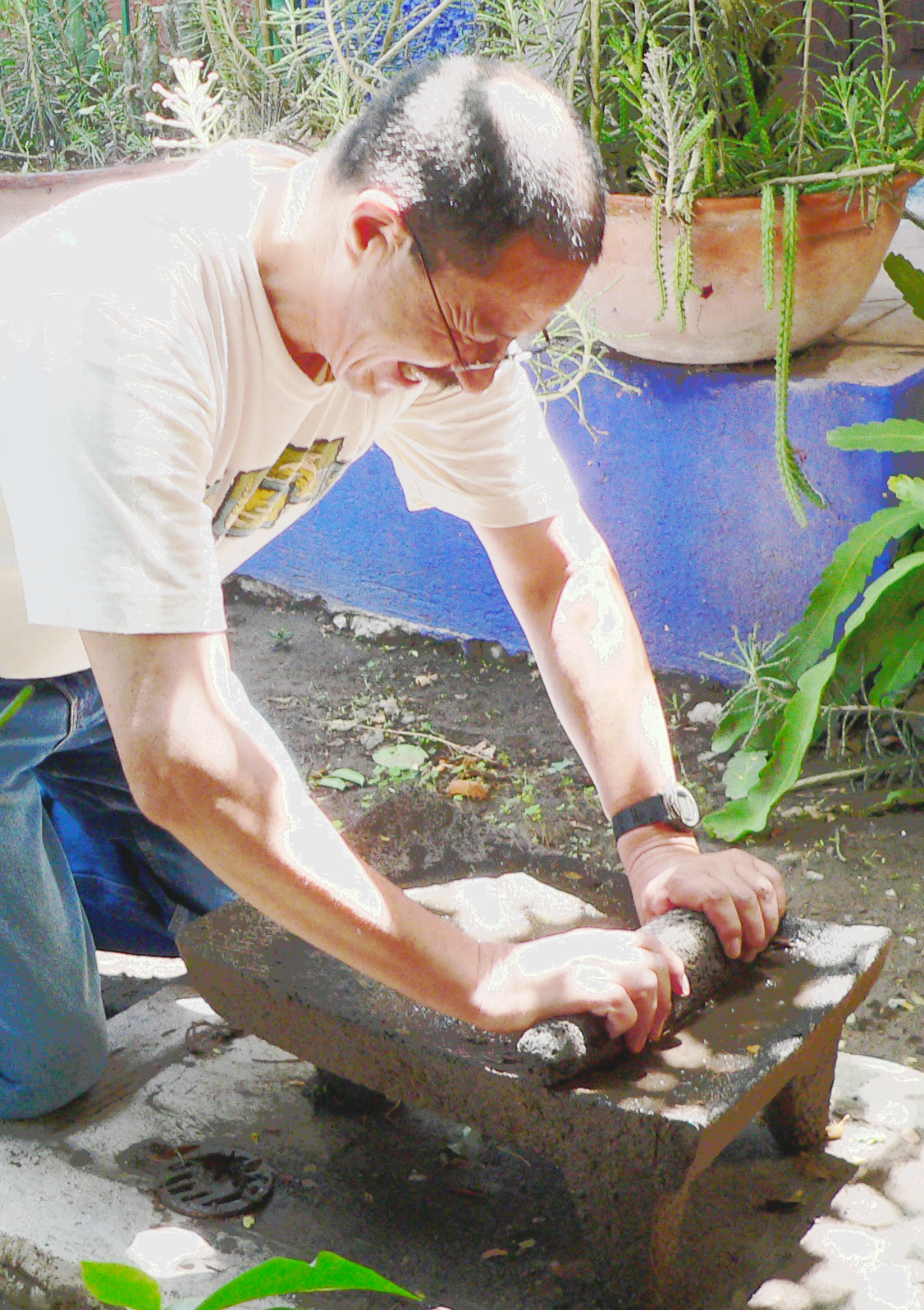
Mexican Metate

=== The metate ===
The metate is a nether millstone for domestic use, for grinding corn. It has been used for several thousand years (around 3000 BC) in the cultural area of Mesoamerica, and its name comes from the Nahuatl "metatl".

Today's millstones are monolithic, usually made of basalt, apodous, or tripod, rectangular, and slightly concave on the grinding surface. These millstones are associated with a two-handed wheel, called a "mano", whose size generally exceeds the width of the millstone and which is driven in an alternating rectilinear motion. On tripod wheels, one of the legs is slightly higher than the other two, giving the whole unit an inclination, with the user standing in front of the highest part.

The manufacture of millstones was essentially a male occupation. In pre-Hispanic times, millers used only stone tools, a practice that persisted in some villages until the mid-20th century. The use of metal tools, probably inherited from building stonemasons, made it possible to use the hardest basalts, resulting in millstones with a lifespan of over thirty years. While the manufacture of apod millstones from blocks of stone naturally polished in a riverbed was once within the reach of many farmers, the production of tripode metates requires specialized craftsmanship.

Grinding plays a key role in Mexican cuisine. Dry grinding is possible, but very few recipes are produced in this way: roasted coffee, roasted corn or beans, salt, sugar loaves, and cocoa are ground into powder. But most preparations require grinding with water. Fruits are ground into juices, beans or boiled vegetables, ingredients are added to various spicy sauces and, above all, corn is used to make the tortillas that form the basis of every meal. The latter are made from nixtamal, i.e. dry corn kernels cooked with lime, then rinsed with water, which softens the kernels and produces a paste. Maize or nixtamal can be ground for preparations other than patties: tamales, pozole, atole, pinole, and masa, with variations in the fineness of the grind depending on the use.

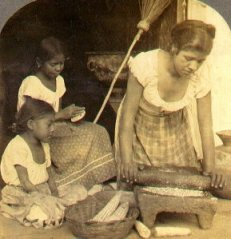
Tortilla-making in El Salvador, circa 1900

The metate was used exclusively by women, and in Mixtec lands, the place where the millstone is located was a space reserved for women. A couple often acquires, or is given, a millstone when they set up home. This acquisition represents a major expense in the life of a Mixtec peasant, as evidenced by the wills of nobles and wealthy peasants from the 16th to 18th centuries, which included metates.

Daily tortillas are made from sufficiently moistened corn dough, which, unlike flour, cannot be preserved. This technical characteristic no doubt explains why domestic metates were not replaced centuries ago by mills, as they were in Europe. During the wars of the 19th century and the Mexican Revolution of 1910, Mexican armies were accompanied by women and metates to ensure the stewardship of the country; the Spanish conquest did not replace tortillas with bread - quite the contrary. At the end of the 19th century, the owners of the large plantations introduced motorized corn mills, which freed up female labor for the fields. From 1920 onwards, electric mills appeared in the countryside, owned by municipalities, cooperatives or private individuals. However, still in use today, nether millstones are still part of Mexico's rural heritage.

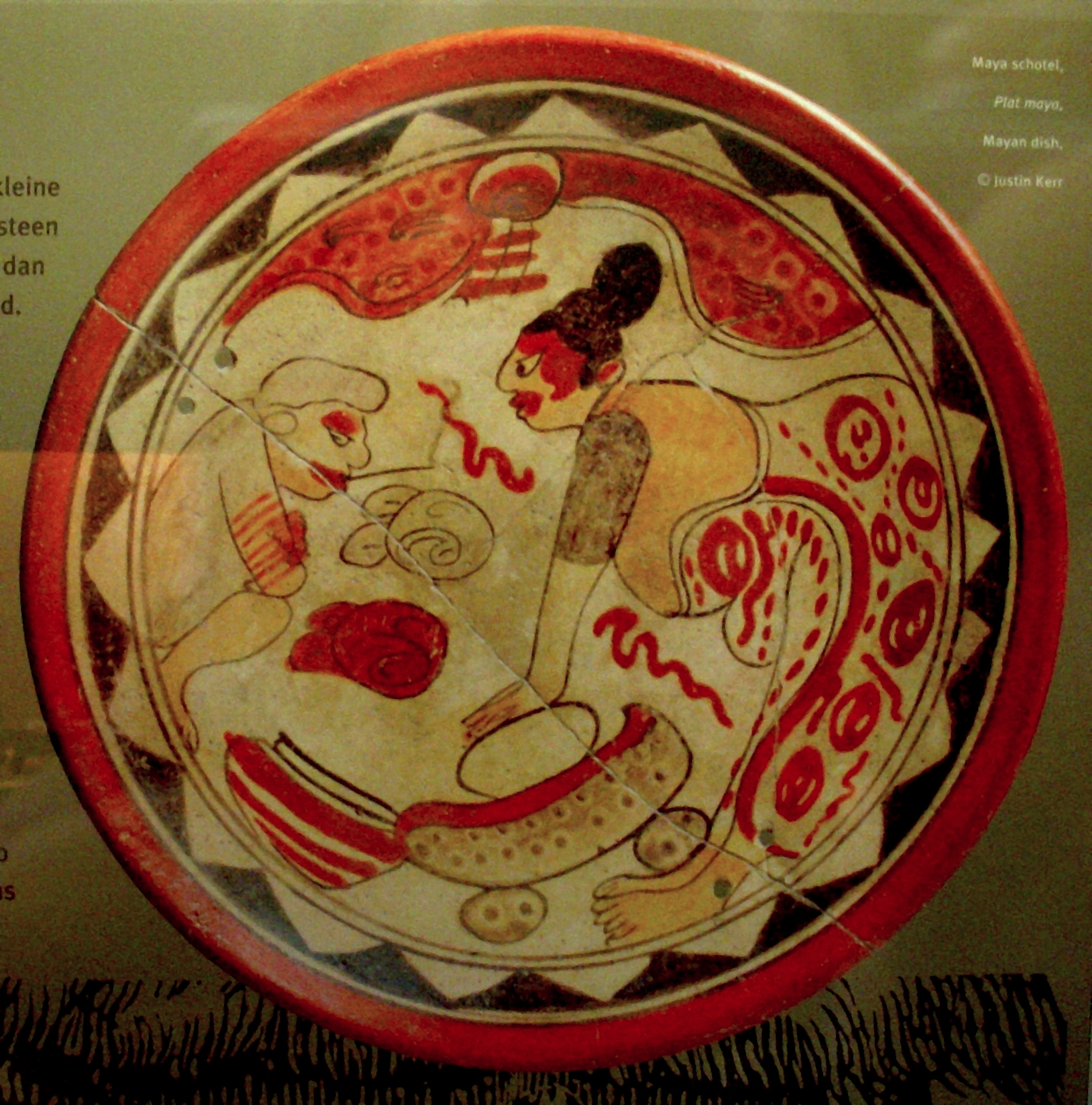
Mayan dish depicting the use of a metate to grind cocoa beans. Chocolate Museum, Bruges.

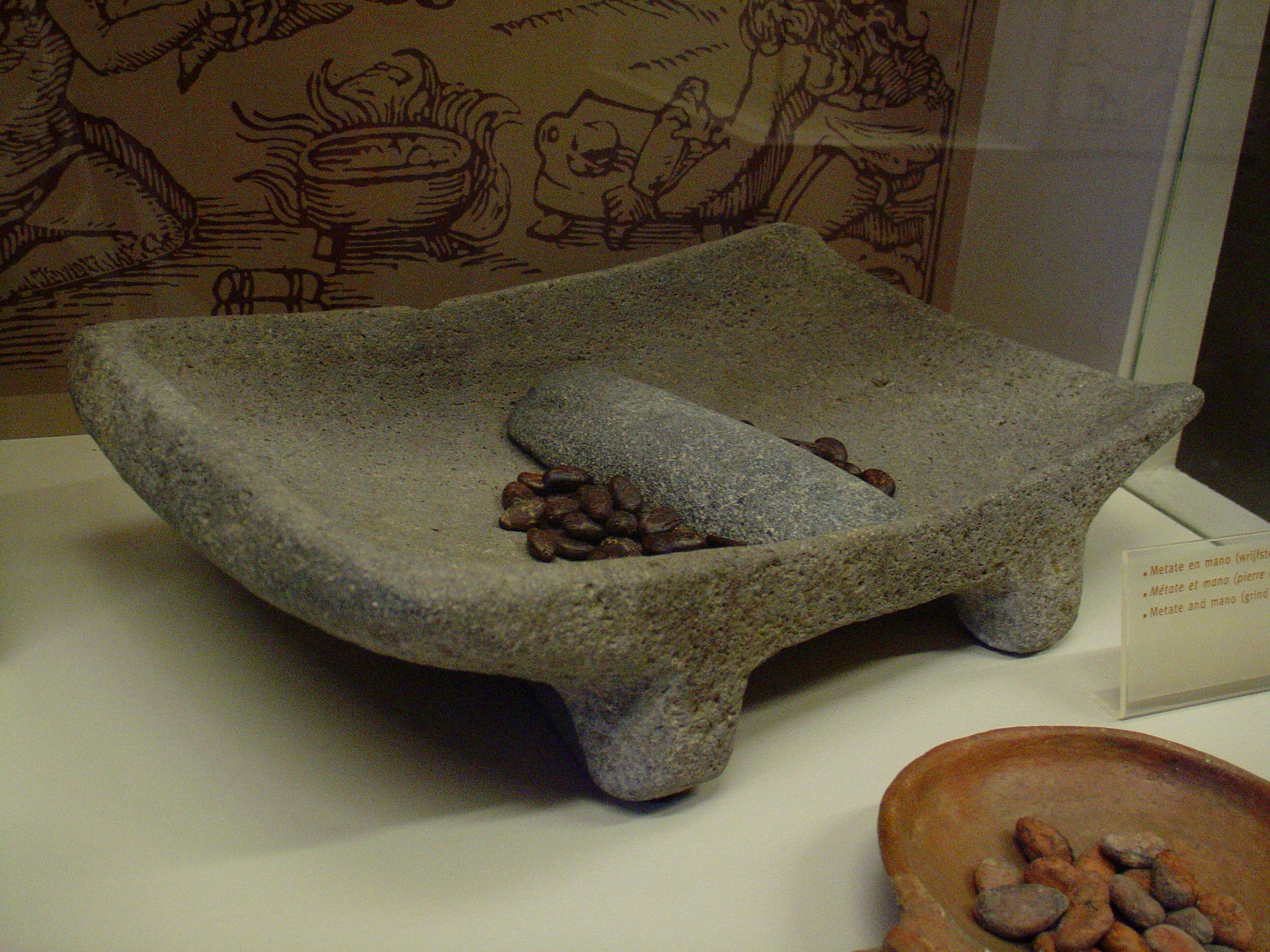
Metate and mano from the Mayan period. Chocolate Museum, Bruges.

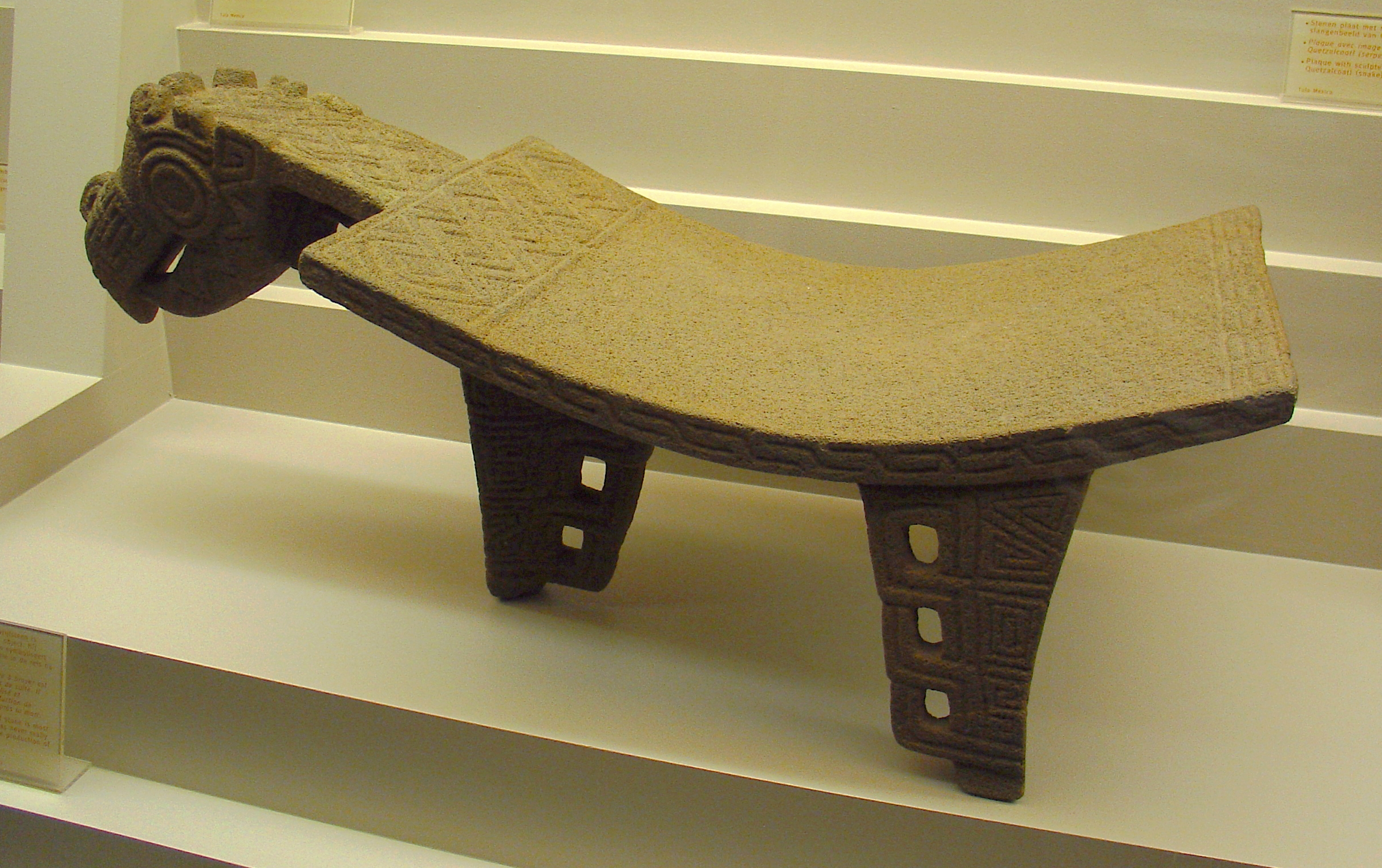
Costa Rican funeral metate. Chocolate Museum, Bruges.

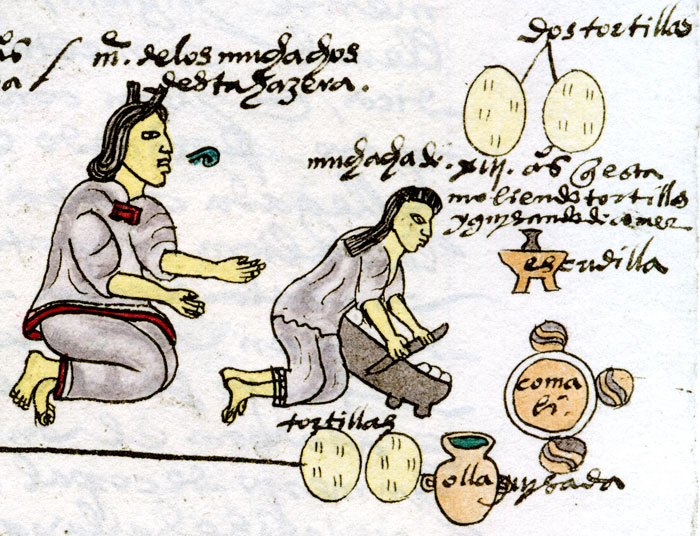
Aztec mother teaching her daughter to make tortillas. Codex Mendoza.

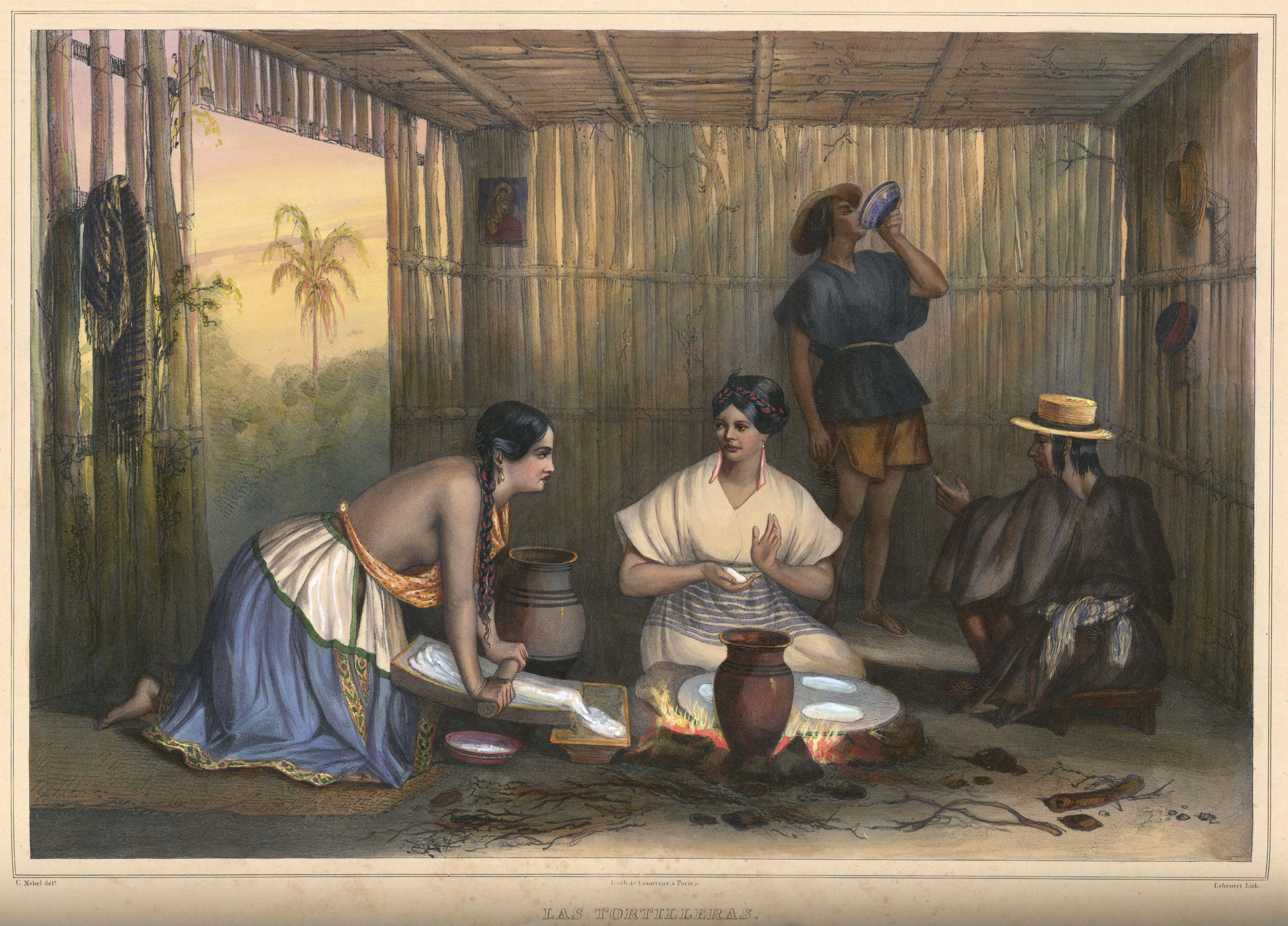
Las Tortilleras (The Tortilla Makers). Hand-colored lithograph, Mexico, early 19th century

=== The Olynthus mill ===
Olynthus mill: 1. Pivot 2. Lever 3. Running stone with hopper 4. Stationary stone 5. Table

The town of Olynthus was destroyed in 348 BC by Philip II of Macedonia, and the name "Olynthus millstone, Olynthus grinder, Olynthus mill" has come to be attached to this type of mill, which represents a genuine technical revolution. In 1917, the Greek Konstantinos Kourouniotis elucidated the workings of the hopper millstone, which played an important role in ancient Greece.

In the Olynthus mill, the nether millstone(4) is rectangular, resting on a table (5); it measures between 0.42 m and 0.65 m in length, 0.36 m to 0.54 m in width and 0.08 to 0.25 m in thickness. The grinder, which forms the upper millstone (common millstone (3)), is usually rectangular, sometimes oval, with a central hopper parallel to the long sides, designed to receive the grain to be ground. The mill is capped by a horizontal axle attached to a pivot (1) on one side of the table, the other end being operated by a worker who moves the lever (2) back and forth horizontally. The Olynthus mill thus shows the beginnings of mechanization, with millers now standing on their feet, making work easier.

This type of mill certainly appeared as early as the beginning of the 5th century BC. Its use was widespread throughout the Greek civilization in the 4th century B.C., from Macedonia to the Peloponnese, and was adopted as far afield as the islands of Anatolia, Egypt, and modern-day Syria. It continued into the 1st century B.C., and sometimes even later, as the excavations at the Agora in Athens suggest. The importance of this mill type for the Greek world was confirmed by the discovery, in 1967, of 22 hopper mills in the cargo of a ship wrecked off Kyrenia, dated to the end of the 4th century BC. Increasing demand undoubtedly led to standardization in manufacturing and specialization of production centers. For example, flat Argolidian millstones, made of andesite and rhyolite, were produced from local quarries (Isthmus of Corinth, Saronic Gulf), while grinders came from more distant quarries (islands of Nysiros, Milos).

The use of this type of mill was not limited to grinding cereals, as the finds from Thasos or Lavrio suggest: it was also used to grind ore, so as to calibrate it for subsequent selection by washing. It may even have appeared in the mines of Pangaion Hills. The text by Agatharchides on the gold mines of Egypt in the 1st century B.C., transmitted by Photios and Diodorus, mentions a mill with a lever:

"Women and older men then receive this ore crushed to the size of peas, throw it into the millstones, in numerous lines, two or three people standing at each lever and grind it." Photius' version specifies "on either side" of the lever.

=== The rotating millstone ===
According to de Barry, the oldest circular stone millstone was unearthed in the ruins of the town of Olynthus: it was the millstone of an oil mill, not a flour mill. Historians Marie-Claire Amouretti and Georges Comet point out that these millstones pre-date the earliest known examples of circular grain mills. So it was probably through oil production that the first rotary crushing machine was introduced. Cereals and other fruits and seeds followed.

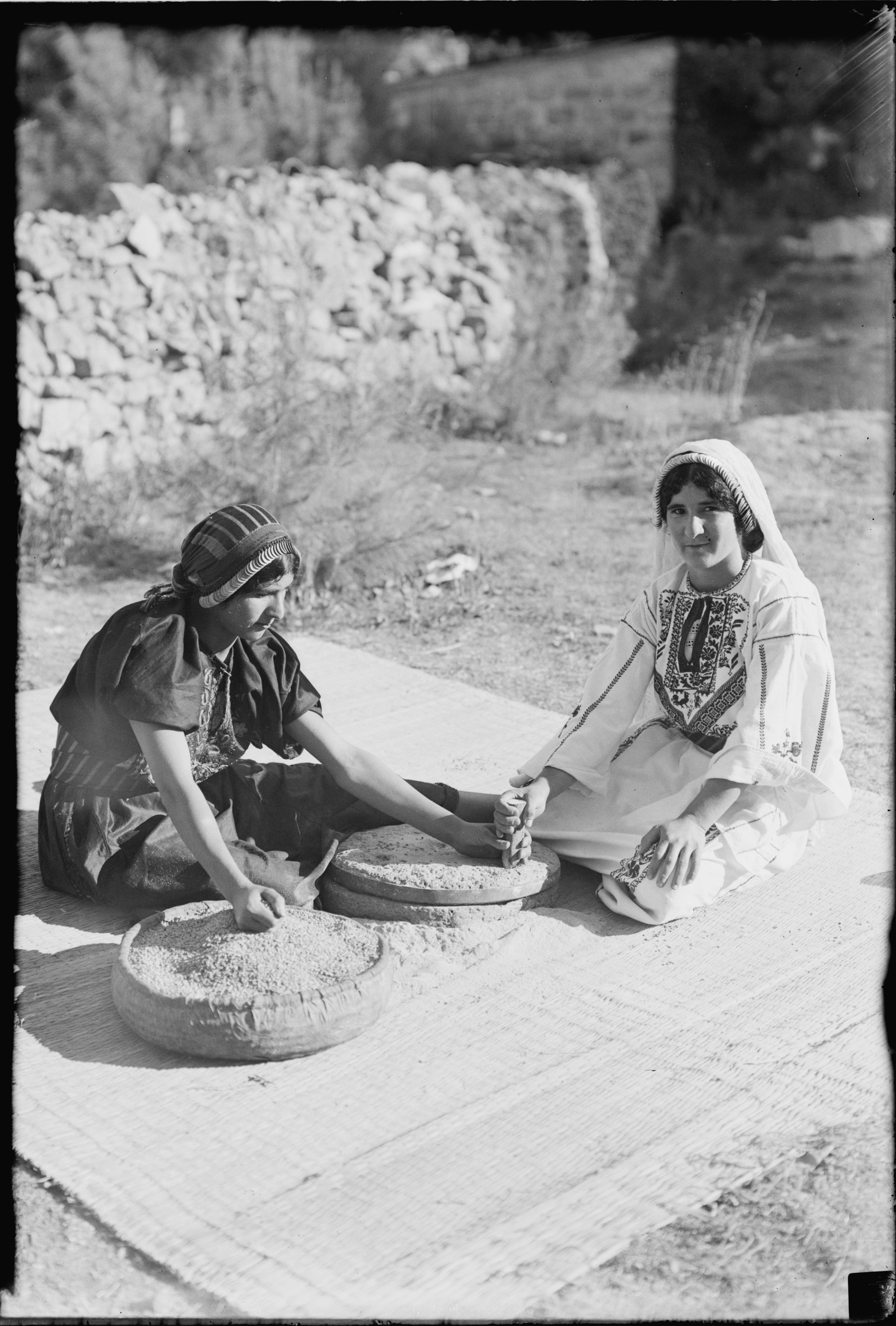
Arab women working primitive grain mill in Palestine (circa 1900)

The oldest rotating millstone are thought to have originated in Spain 2,500 years ago(600 BC - 400 BC). It seems that the rotating millstone spread at the end of the 5th century BC from Spain, and that it was directly derived from attempts to perfect the Olynthus mill. André Leroi-Gourhan states that "the transformation of rectilinear reciprocating motion into circular-continuous motion leads to another form of milling". Some authors do not agree on its geographical origin, located for some "towards Carthage and the Syrian-Egyptian region", "simultaneously in Spain and England" for others, and even though it was found in China in the 1st century BC. According to L.A. Moritz, the rotating grain mill only appeared in the first century BC. He bases his demonstration on Latin texts, in particular those of Plautus and Cato, and fixes the introduction of this type between the time of Plautus' death in 184BC and the composition of De agri cultura, around 160 BC.

Several types of mills can be identified in Europe, depending on the morphology of the millstones used in these manually operated rotary mills.

The Celtic mill is made up of massive millstones, with a conical external profile and virtually flat active stone surfaces.

In Dacia, between the 1st century B.C. and the 1st century A.D., the Celtic mill evolved into an intermediate type with two millstones superimposed and integrated, featuring a three-lobed feed opening. The more sharply tapered inner surfaces of the millstones ensured that the grains flowed more quickly under the effect of gravity, but the quality of the flour obtained remained mediocre. On the other hand, the effort required to operate the current millstone is considerable. The profile of the millstones makes them more difficult to cut, imposes a standardization of the millstones, and explains their diffusion and maintenance in a given region. Some examples feature flatter wheels, with a much reduced taper, which reduces the stone mass. The speed of rotation became higher, providing a greater gyroscopic effect, but also requiring the installation of a system of claws fixed with molten lead on the upper side of the movable wheel, to hold it in place around the pivot.

Romanization led to the widespread use of hand mills, which were perfected in terms of volume by increasing diameter and reducing height and weight. The profile of the millstones became flatter, and a number of improvements were introduced, such as an upper wedge to center the movable wheel on the pivot. A device for adjusting the distance between the millstones (the anille) also appeared, enabling grinding quality to be controlled (1st century B.C.), and radii cut into the millstone could accentuate the natural abrasiveness of the stone. Later developments, such as the installation of the double lever or the use of a crank fixed to the center of the millstone (14th - 15th centuries), meant that this type of hand mill was used in the countryside until the 20th century.

Because they wear more quickly, this type of millstone requires a stricter selection of stones, among which basalt has a privileged place. Most of the stone used in Roman times seems to have come from just a few quarries. In France, millstones from Cap d'Agde supplied Languedoc and Provence; further north, quarries from the Massif Central (Volvic) supplied a vast territory stretching from Aquitaine to the Helvetic valleys; finally, from the Saône valley to the German border, millstones came mainly from Eifel quarries (Mayen).

In Europe as a whole, the hand mill remained the main milling method until the end of Antiquity, and then throughout the Middle Ages; it only began to give way to the advances of water and then wind mills.

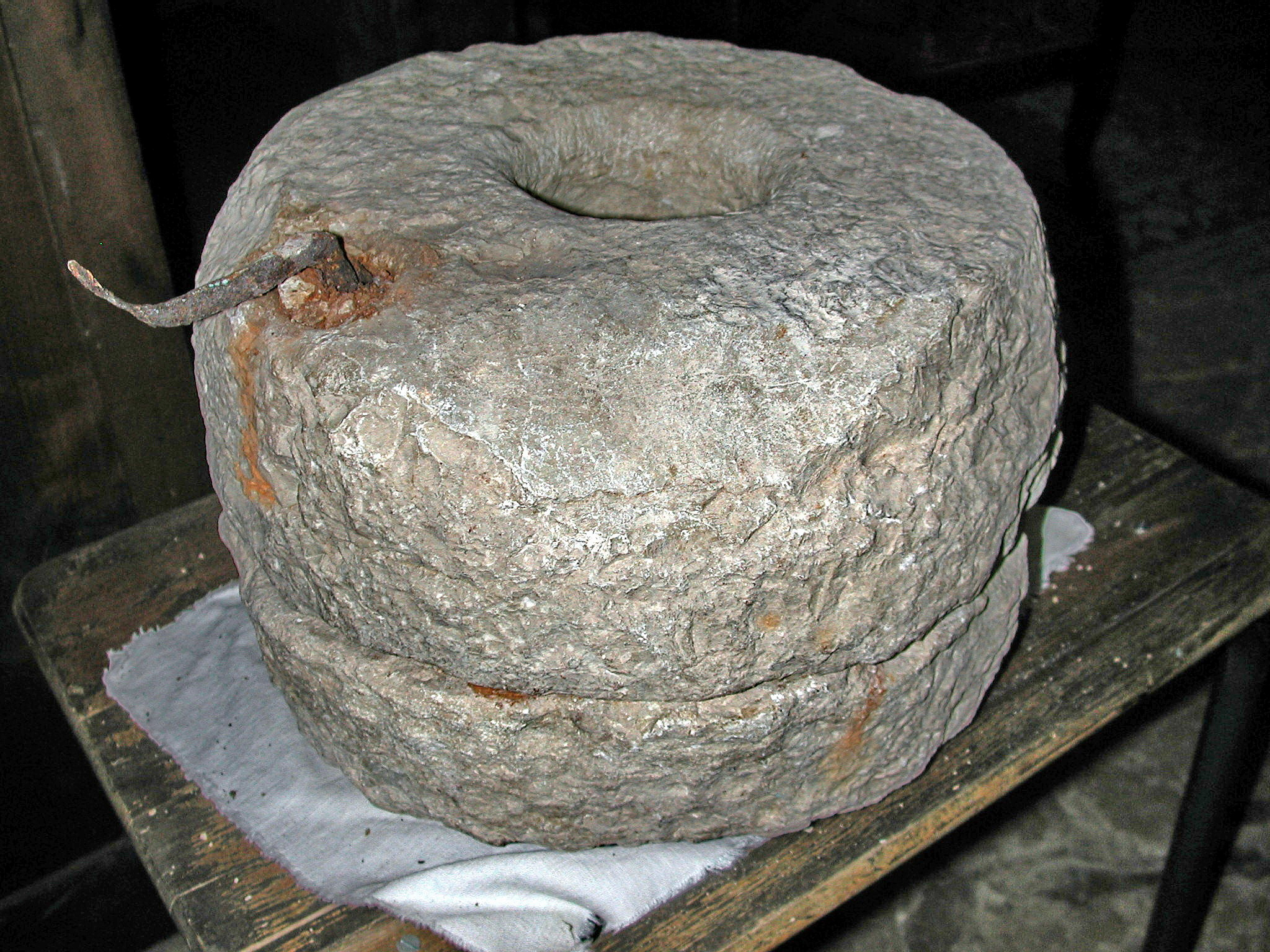
Celtic-type hand mill

Cross-section of a Celtic arm mill 1- Pivot 2- Lever 3- Running wheel 4- Nether wheel

Cross-section of a dacique arm mill 1- Pivot 2- Lever 3- Running wheel 4- Lying wheel 5- Support

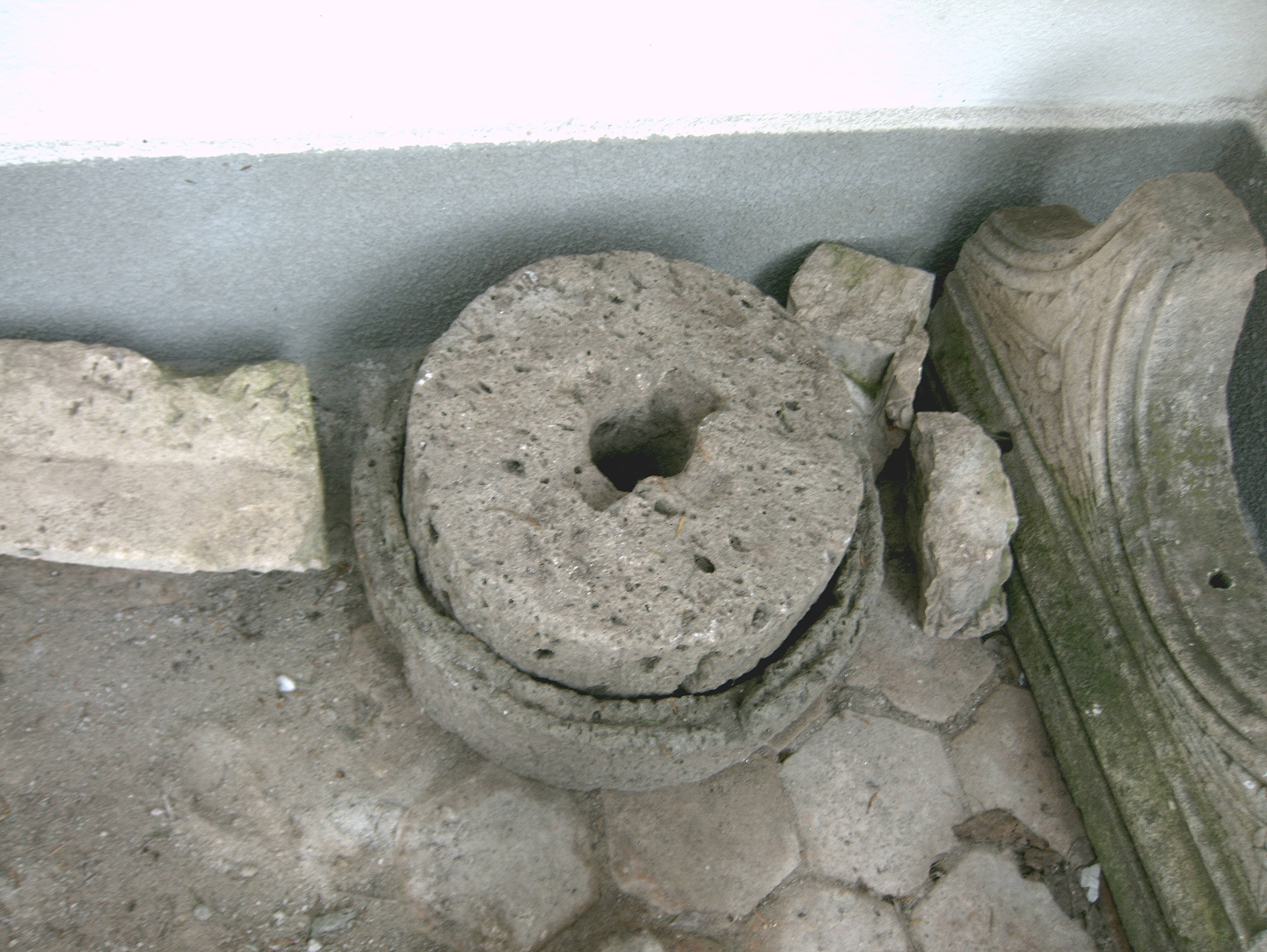
Roman hand mill with top shim to center the millstone wheel

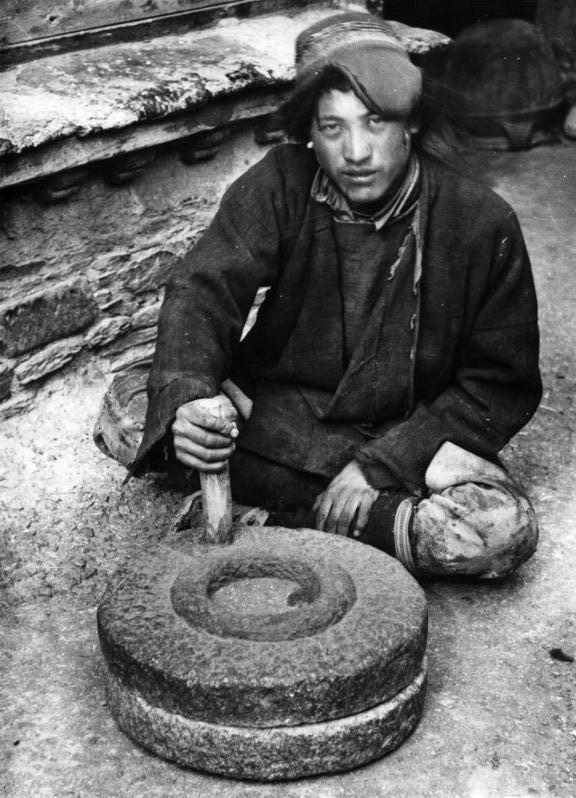
Millstone wheel used in Tibet (Lhasa, 1938)

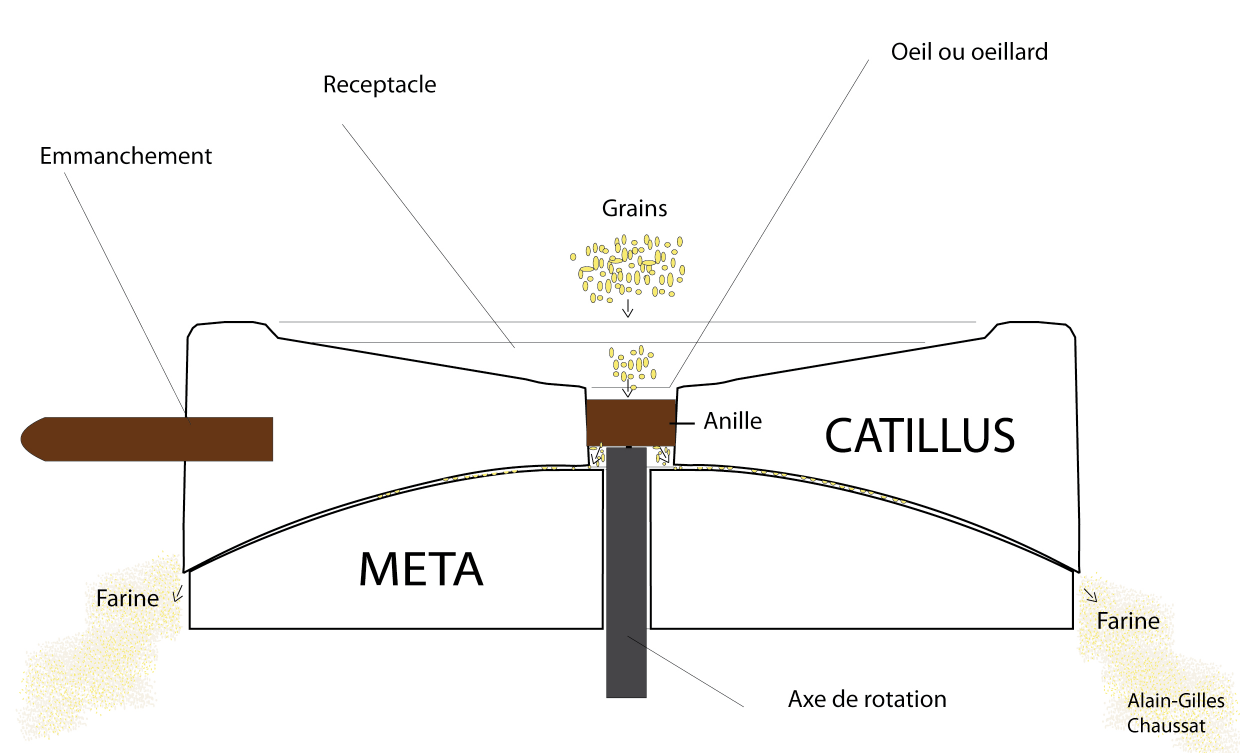
Schematic of an antique manual mill in action

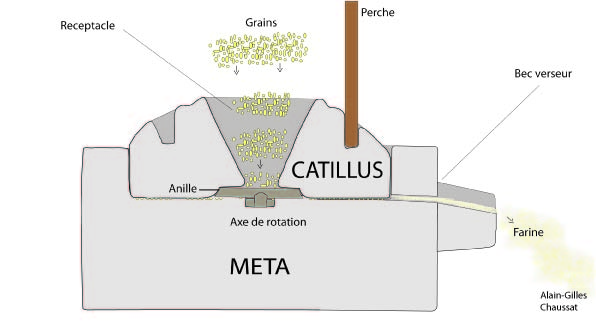
Diagram of a manual mill in the Auge region, dating from the 13th to 18th centuries.

=== The Pompeian mill or "blood" mill ===
With a diameter limited to the reach of an arm's movement, i.e. 40 to 70 cm, the hand mill could only produce a limited quantity of flour and was therefore essentially reserved for domestic use. By increasing the diameter and, above all, the height of the meta (nether millstone) and the catillus (runner millstone), the Romans were able to overcome this constraint with the animal-drawn Pompeian mill, also known as the "blood" mill.

In this mill, the nether millstone is conical at the top and the runner millstone looks like an hourglass, with its lower half covering the conical top of the nether millstone. The upper part of the runner millstone acts as a funnel, and a slight gap is maintained between the two millstones. The running wheel pivots around a wooden axle embedded in the standing wheel, and it is thanks to its suspension on this axle that the gap between the two wheels is ensured. This type of millstone could be powered either by two or four men, or by animal rides, hence its name mola asinaria, literally "donkey mill".

An example of this type of millstone can be found as early as the Classical era, used to grind ore in the Laurion mines, although it did not overtake the less efficient reciprocating millstone. Despite its qualities, it didn't really spread throughout the Roman world until later. They were found throughout the Mediterranean basin, but never in very large numbers, except in Italy. Their very high cost - 1,250 denarii in the Late Roman period, compared with 250 denarii for hand millstones - meant that they were only used by millers and bakers. In Gaul, millstones are known from Lyon, Saint-Raphaël, Paris, Amiens and Clermont-Ferrand, all fashioned from basalt from the Eifel, Volvic or Cap d'Agde.

During the late antiquity, the donkey mill retreated, probably disappearing after the 5th century as a result of the expansion of the watermill, then the windmill, except in Sardinia, where it remained until the 20th century.

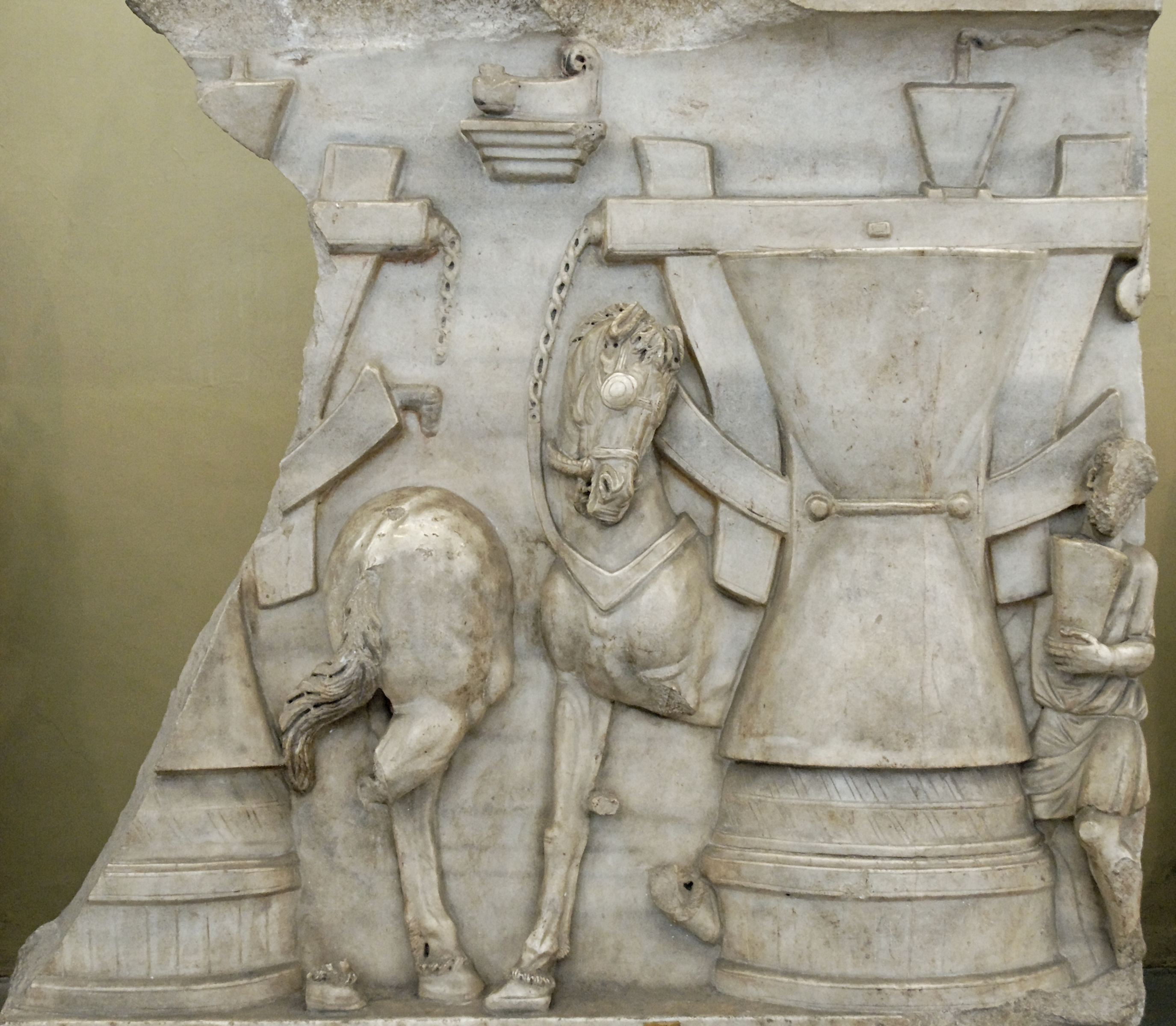
Hellenistic horse-powered grinding mill. Detail of a 2nd-century Roman sarcophagus. Vatican Museums

Schematic diagram of the grinding mill: 1- Pivot 2- Hitch frame 3- Running wheel 4- Lying wheel

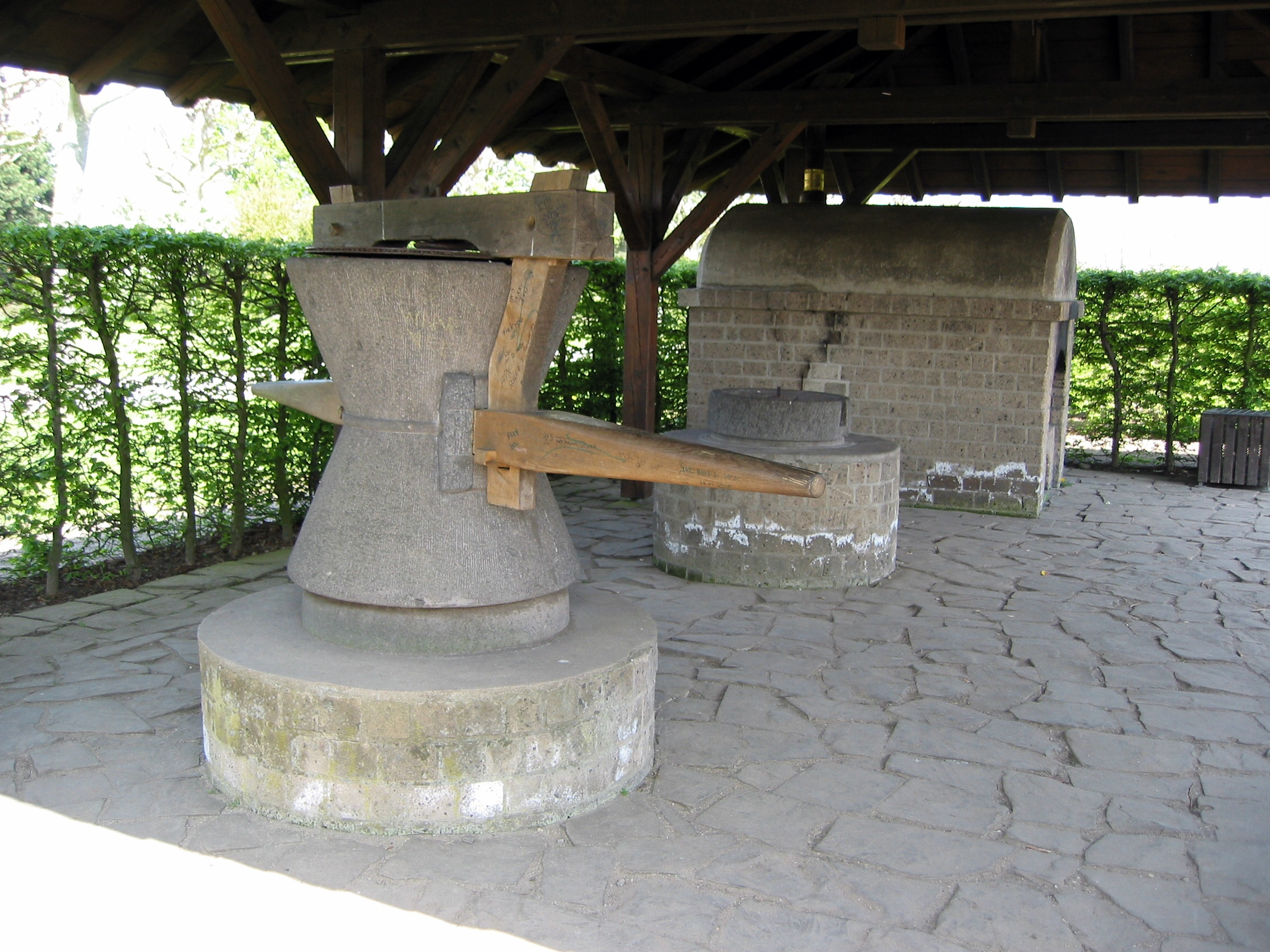
Wheat mill. Xanten Archeology Park

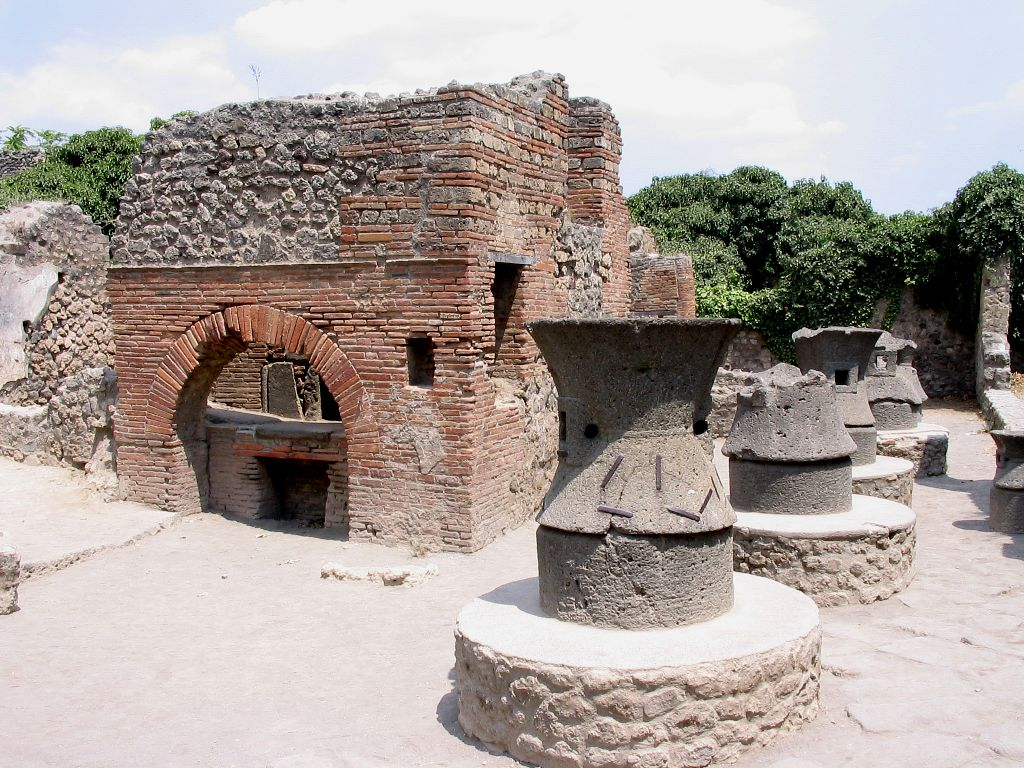
Millstones made of two elements of volcanic lava. Bakery in Pompeii.

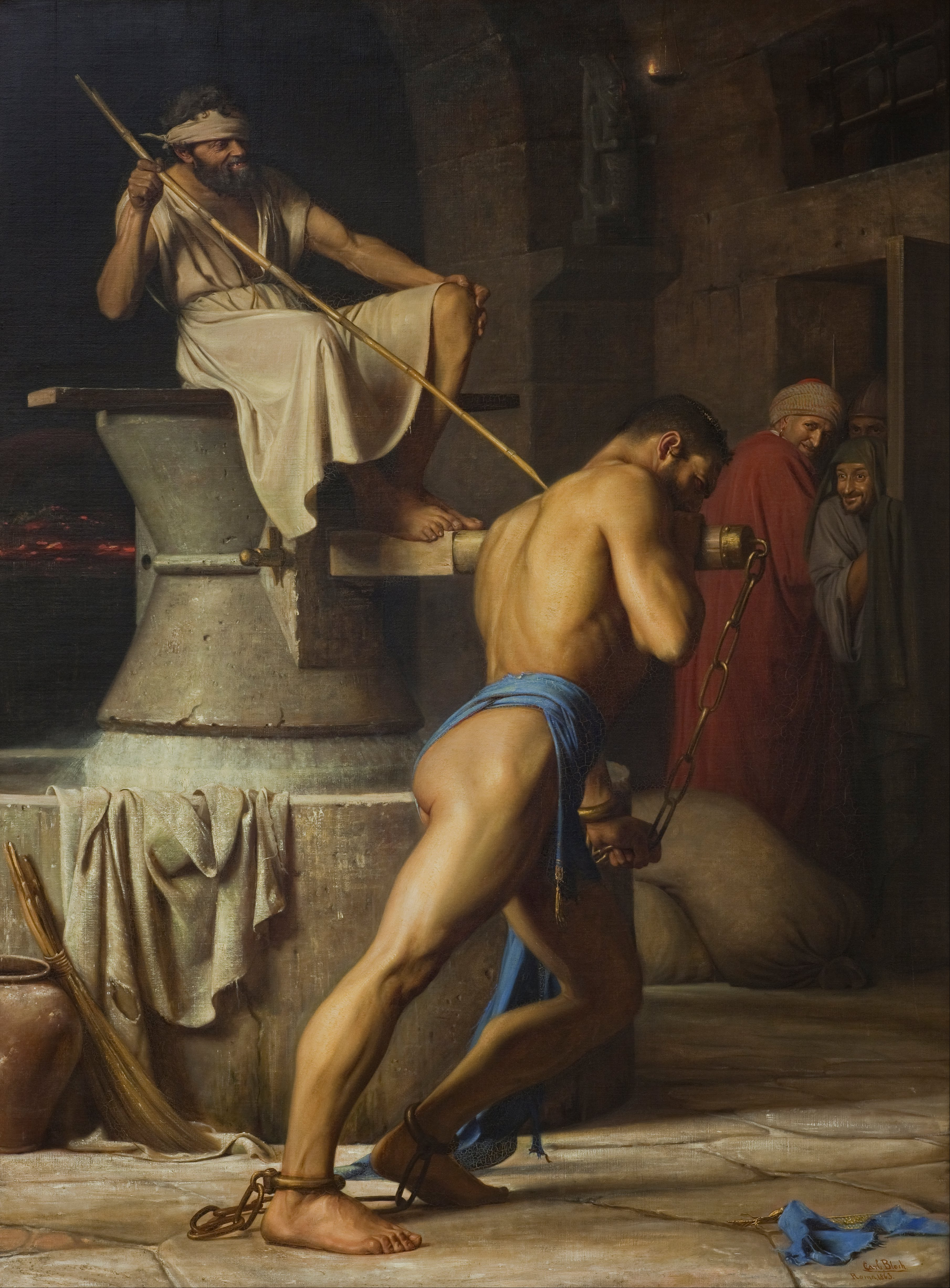
Samson, prisoner of the Philistines, turns the millstone in prison, Carl Bloch (1863)

=== The Roman trapetum ===
The Hellenistic period also saw the appearance of the olive crusher, which the Romans called the trapetum. Legend has it that it was invented by Aristaeus, and excavations at Olynthus have revealed examples dating back to the 5th century BC.

The trapetum was precisely described by Cato the Elder, who gave us the technical names of all its parts. Excavations at Stabies, Pompeii, the villa at Boscoreale and in Roman Africa show that the system was widely used in ancient Rome and disappeared with it.

The trapetum consists of two plano-convex millstones (3, orbes), standing vertically, supported by a horizontal axis rotating around a vertical pivot (1, columella). This pivot rests on a short stone column (milliarium) at the center of a large hemispherical mortar (4). The lying millstone is a stone vat (4, mortarium) whose walls follow the external profile of the two common millstones. The orbs can move in a circular motion inside the mortarium, and are set in motion by the action of two wooden handles (2, modioli). Wooden wedges (orbiculi) inserted between the milliarium and the columella are used to adjust the height of the orbs above the bottom of the vat. In this system, the olives are not crushed under the millstone, but between the millstone and the sides of the vat. As in the previous model, a gap was maintained between the two millstones. The resistance offered by the fruit forces the stone half-spheres to turn slightly on their axis; the two movements combine and the pressure is exerted only moderately, without breaking the stones, which would give bad taste. The resultant pulp could then be subjected to the action of a press to collect the oil.

=== Millstones of southern Morocco ===
Roman olive mill or Trapetum

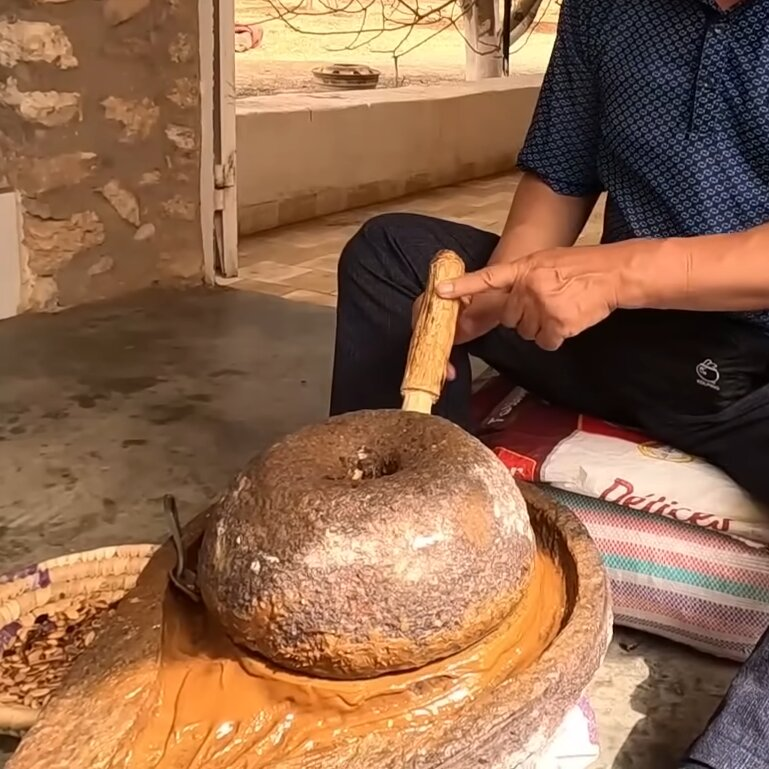
Hand mill used to make argan oil by hand

A melting pot of African, Eastern and Mediterranean civilizations, Morocco has preserved tools and techniques from different eras.

The Volubilis site, located in Mauritania Tingitana (northeastern Morocco), features grain and olive mills from the Roman period (1st century-2nd century). These mills consist of a truncated cone-shaped standing millstone and a convex grinding ring to which the wooden machinery is connected, apparently operated without the aid of animal power. In this arrangement, the grinding ring is fitted onto the lying millstone. The Volubilitan olive millstone differs from the grain millstone by having oblique striations on the truncated surface of the lying millstone and on the inside of the grinding ring. Columella asserts that, to extract the oil, the millstones (molae) are more useful than the crusher (trapetum), as they can be lowered or raised according to the size of the fruit, so as to avoid crushing the stone.

A second type of olive mill can be found on the same site, and consists of a monolithic vat on which a fluted drum turns around a vertical mast like the section of a column. This type of mill is more common and can be found on many sites, even in recent times.

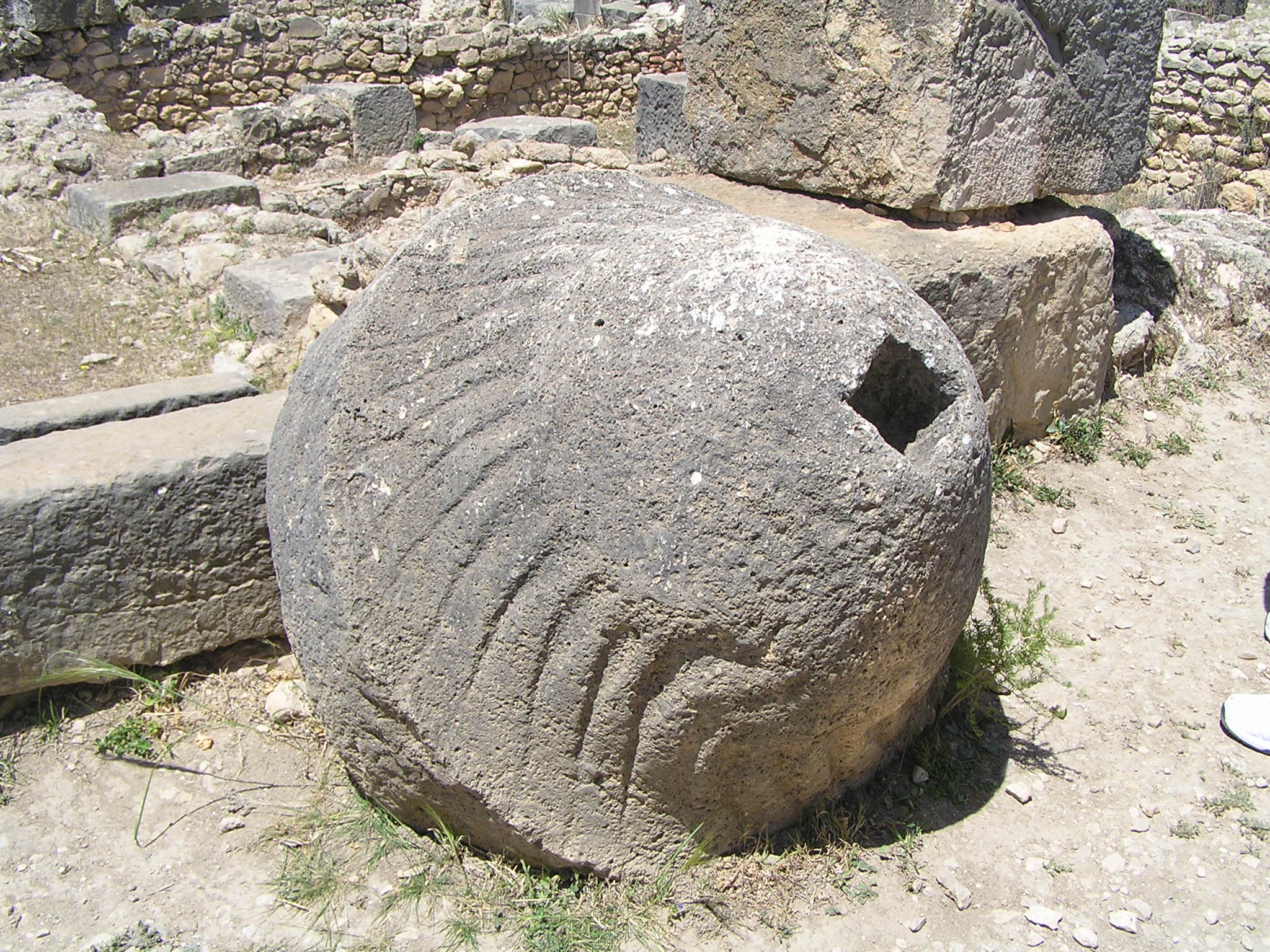
Giant olive wheel - Volubilis

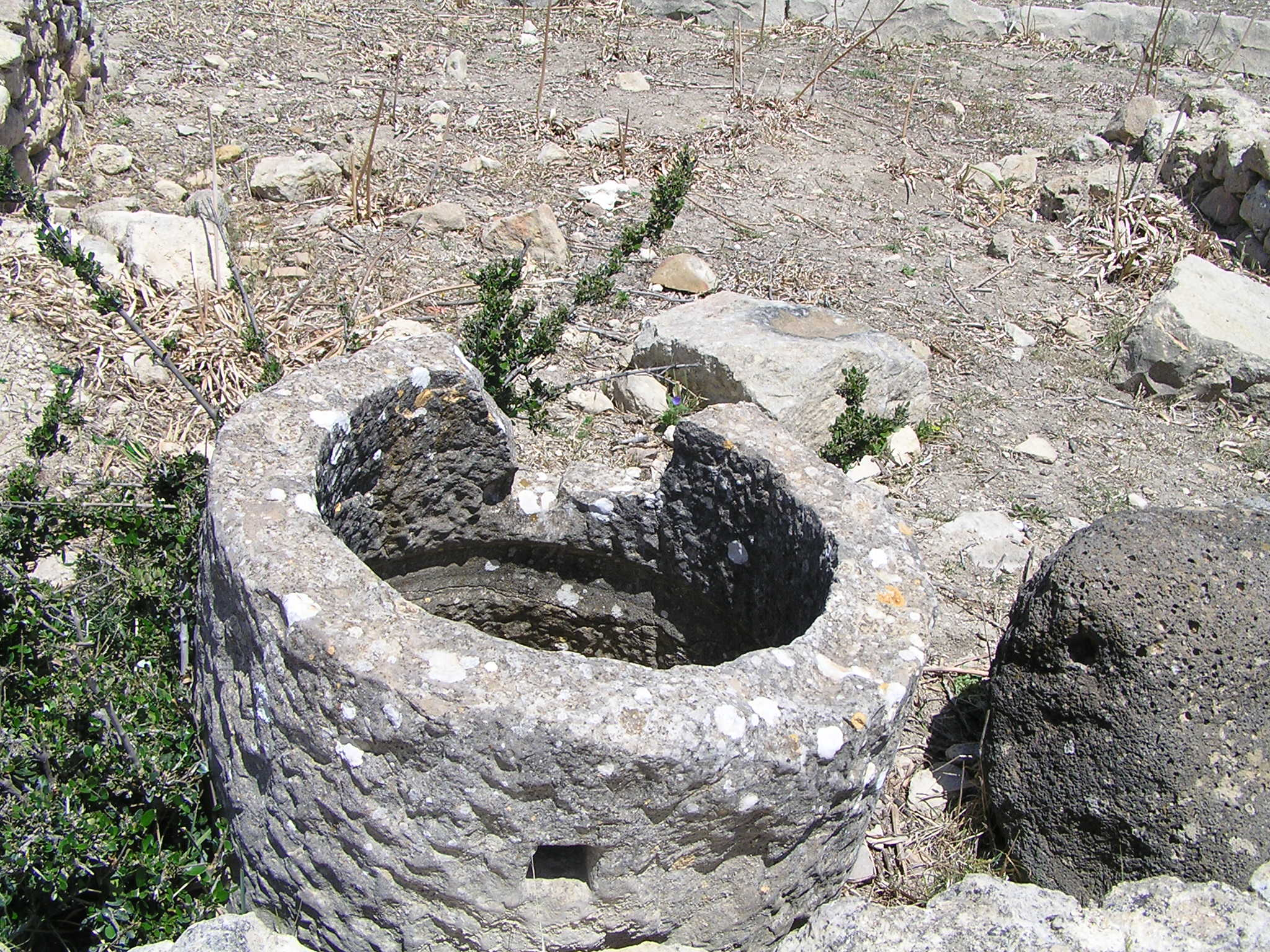
Grinder ring - Volubilis

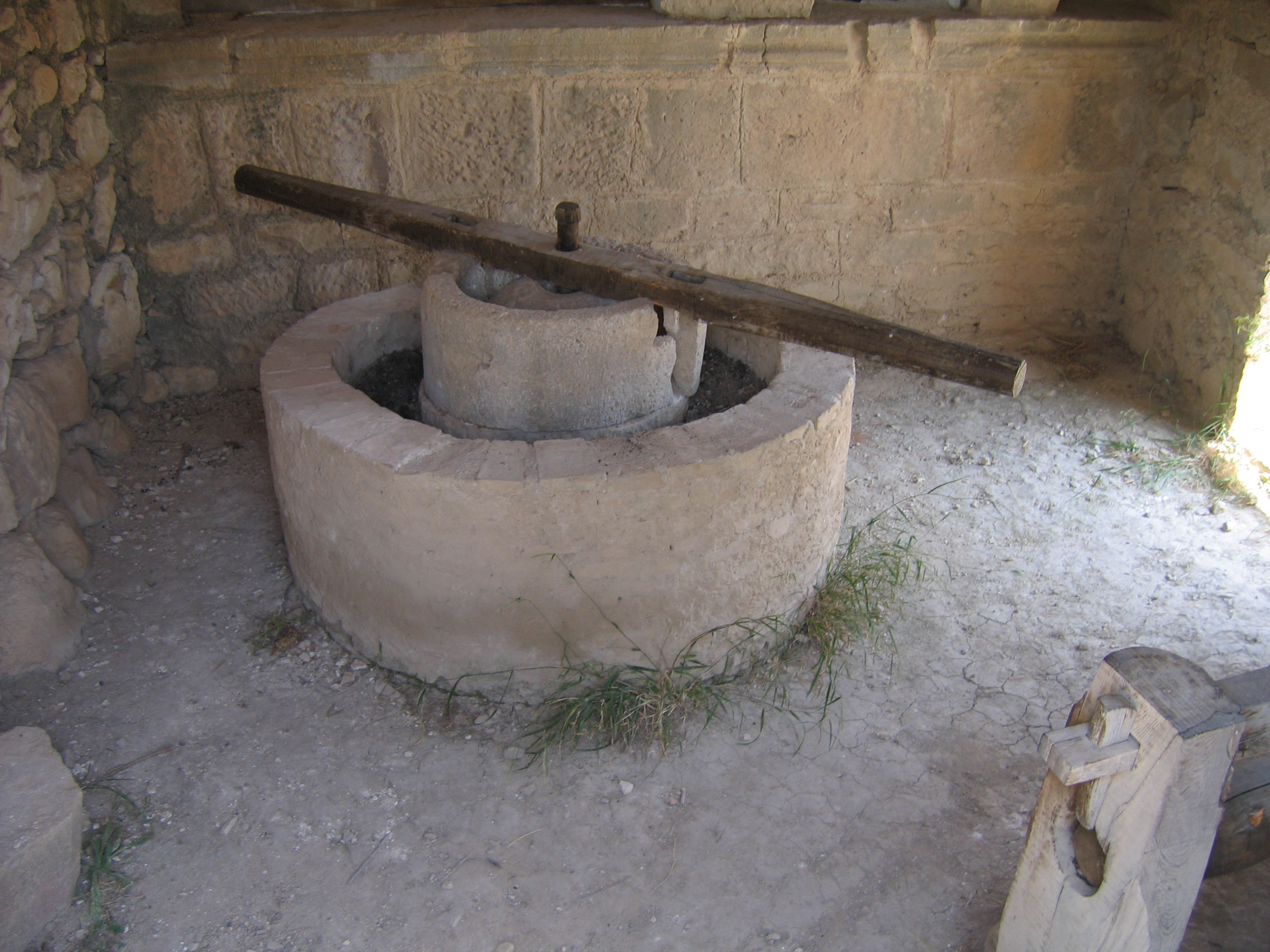
Olive mill with grinding ring - Volubilis

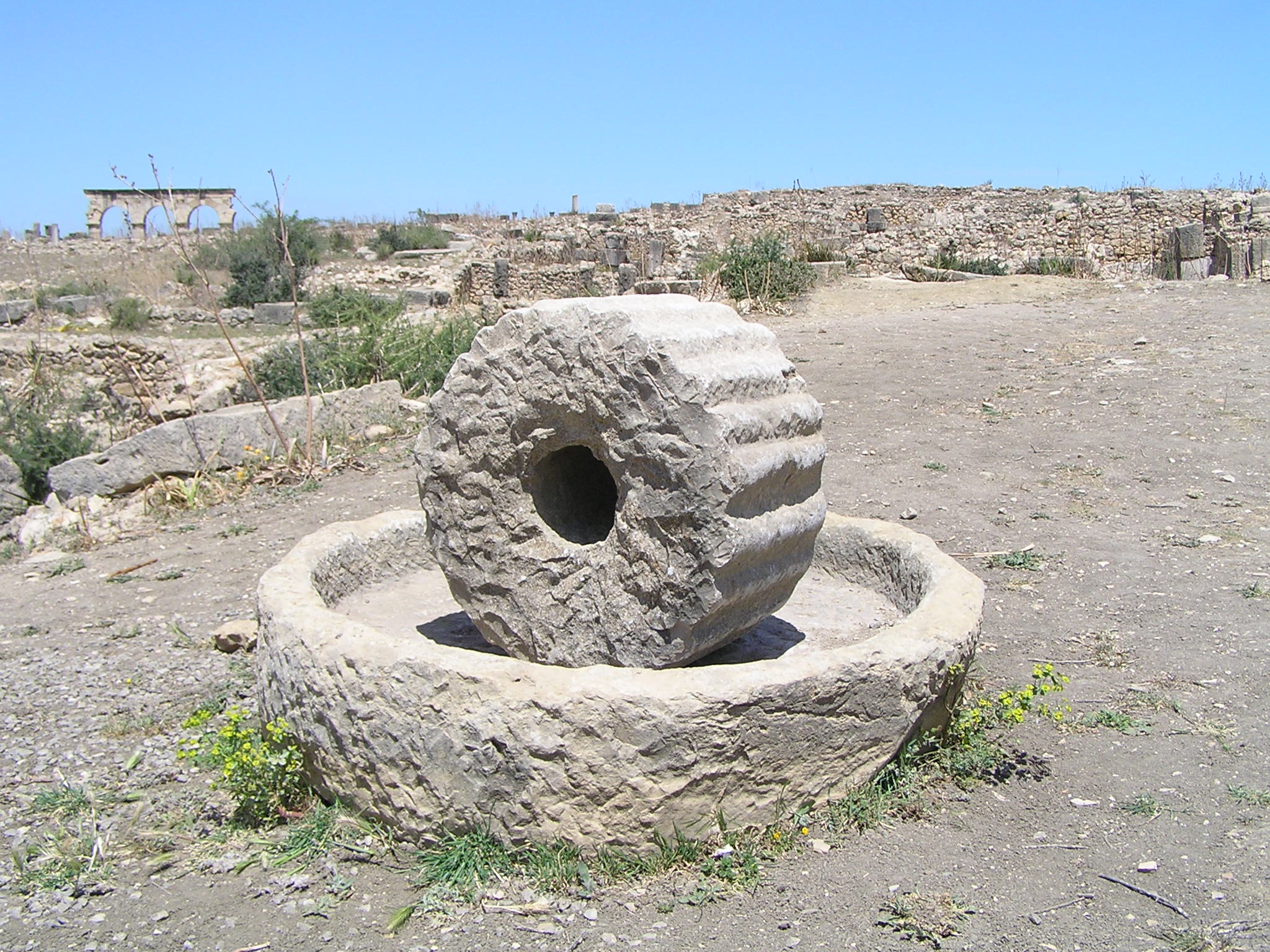
Trituration mill with upright millstone - Volubilis

The argan tree is a woodland species endemic to southwest Morocco. The technical environment of the argan mill covers its range. It's a stone hand mill used to grind roasted kernels and almonds.

It stands out from the grain mill thanks to the truncated cone shape and greater height of its runner millstone (agurf wuflla), as well as the presence of a spout (abajjr or tilst) and a pouring spout (ils) on the nether millstone (agurf u wadday). At the center of the nether millstone is a short pivot (tamnrut) made of argan wood, around which the upper millstone rotates, pierced by an eyelet (tit n tzrgt) into which one or two handfuls of kernels are inserted. The circular movement is interrupted to remove the kernels after the millstone has been lifted. The whole unit can be raised on stones welded together in a "bakehouse"-style architecture, allowing embers or argan shells to warm the unit, thus facilitating grinding in winter.

=== Chronology of milling systems ===
│
−600
│
−420
│
−240
│
−60
│
120
│
300
[1] Mortar and pestle (-600 to 300), [2] Flat grinding wheels and grinders (-600 to 300), [3] Olynthus hopper mill (-450 to 150), [4] Meta and Catillus manual grinding wheels (-250 to 0), [5] Pompeii-type "blood" mill (-150 to 300), [6] Manual rotating mill (-350 to 300), [7] Manual gear mill (250 to 300), [8] Watermill (-100 to 300).

Mortars and pestles have survived the centuries and are predominant for barley in Greece, starch in Italy, and millet in Africa. They slowly became marginal in some regions, but did not disappear. In classical times, they were still widely represented in Greece and were still used for hulling cereals, even if the advent of adjustable millstones meant that they could now be ground. The advance of naked wheat, particularly common wheat, in Italy and Egypt made them less useful, but they were still mentioned in the Late Roman Empire, in Roman Egypt, and in the monastic rule of Saint Isidore. With the arrival of maize, they were once again used in certain regions.

A first typology of milling systems can be drawn up according to the driving force used; a complementary approach will look at the social context in which the mechanism is implemented.

According to Diocletian's edict, the "blood" mill costed six times more than the hand mill, and the watermill eight times more. The latter therefore competed mainly with the "blood" mill, and took almost three centuries to supplant it. This was also the time it took the "blood" mill to supplant the hopper mill, and the hopper mill to supplant the flat millstone.

It seems that the watermill originated in the Eastern Mediterranean. An inscription from the Phrygian town of Orcistus, which praised the advantages of its site in order to retain its privileges, states that it possesses "thanks to the slope of the waters flowing through it, a large number of watermills". At the beginning of the Christian era, the watermill was still a novelty in the western Mediterranean, and Vitruvius classed it with irrigation machines. This type of mill proved ill-suited to the design of Pompeian millstones. In Caligula's time, "blood" mills were still dominant, as Apuleius describes. Over the course of the 1st and 2nd centuries, the watermill slowly spread to a wide variety of provinces: Brittany, Gaul, and Africa, where the rotary millstone was often more widespread than the Pompeian mill. Over the course of the 4th century, the watermill slowly replaced the "blood" mill in Rome itself, becoming the predominant mill in the 2nd century. While there were some spectacular achievements in cities, such as the Barbegal mill in Arles, the watermill seems to have spread more slowly to rural villas, as Palladius indicates.

We don't really know how the Greeks processed their cereals between the 1st and 4th centuries. The "blood" mill was undoubtedly widespread, as attested by the legend of Lucius' donkey, borrowed by Lucian of Samosata and Apuleius. The coexistence of several types of milling seems to be the rule in the Aegean world, and the codification of Diocletian's edict in the 2nd century, which established three types of mills (hand, blood, and water), can still be found in the Byzantine rural code in the 6th century, and even in travellers' accounts in the 17th century.

In the Mediterranean, watermills, which depended on water supply, progressed especially when they had a complement to avoid the vagaries of the dry season. In this context, windmills undoubtedly contributed to the spread of watermills as early as the 11th century in regions such as Provence and the Greek islands.

=== Other milling systems ===
==== Assembled millstones ====
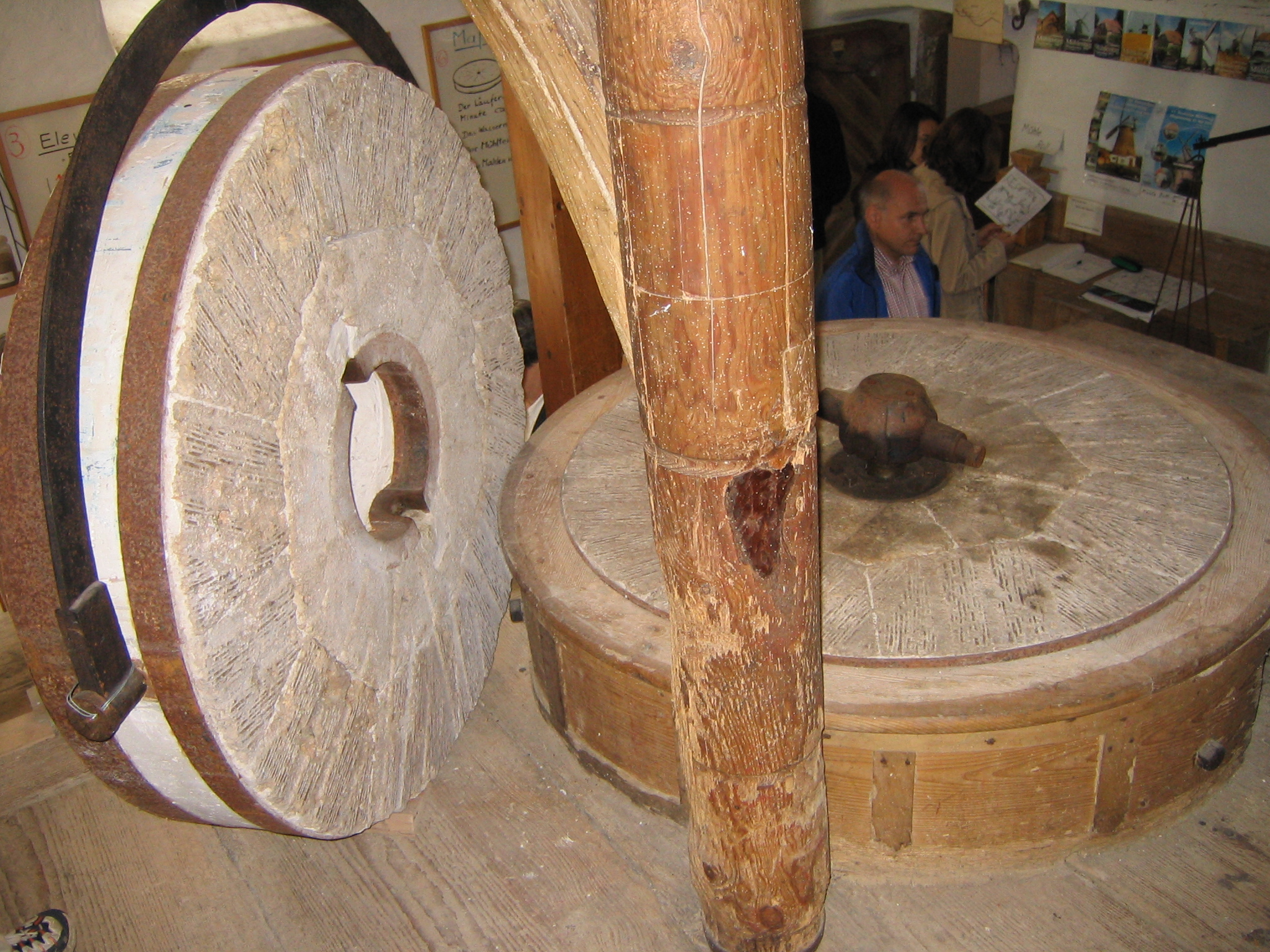
Pair of grinding wheels made of assembled tiles

In a study of millstones in Flanders from the Middle Ages to the French Revolution, Jean Bruggeman points out that medieval millstones were always monolithic, that black basalt stones were still monolithic in later centuries, and that white stones remained so until the 18th century. However, "gisantes" were sometimes made up of several irregularly shaped pieces. These were bound in plaster, encased in an iron or wooden casing, and sometimes placed on a bed of cemented bricks.

In fact, the invention of millstones made of pieces, i.e. an assembly of several stones or tiles, remains difficult to date precisely.

In the 15th century, the river trade passing through Paris was strictly controlled by the Hanseatic League of water merchants; "French companies" had to inform the clerks of the names of their partners, the city of destination, and the nature and value of the cargo. Thus, on May 3, 1452, a Rouen merchant named Robert Le Cornu declared that he was bringing to Normandy one or more boats loaded with 35 millstones, 5 blinkers, 100 carreaux and a tombstone.

Various texts provide clues to the manufacture of millstones in the 17th century. On March 10, 1647, Jacques Vinault "sold 3 rounds of grinding stone" to Pierre Bailly. On March 26, 1652, another text evokes the difficulties of a millstone assembly site, with a "lack of wood to cook the plastre quy is not in sufficient quantity to plastrer and put in the places where it is necessary, joinct aussy that there is stone to suffice to make the millstones". On July 7, 1680, Sr Delugré "made a deal with Claude Duvau and Jullien Boullmer, stone molders [...] to supply them with 2 molds of molding stone and plaster to make the millstones [...] made and perfect to make flour".

According to Dorothée Kleinmann, "economic milling" and its improvements really took off at the end of the 18th century. This led to the development of stone quarrying and millstone production in new regions such as Cinq-Mars-la-Pile and Domme, where "millstones are always formed by joining several pieces together; there are no blocks large enough to make masses from a single piece". In these locations, it seems that at the beginning of the eighteenth century, millstone was not yet quarried, preferring to salvage scattered blocks from woods, fields and vineyards, which sometimes considerably increased their value.

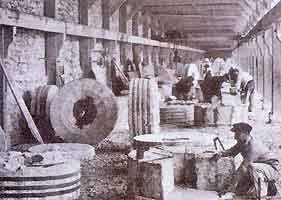
Millstone production workshop in Épernon

Once the millstone blocks have been transported to the site and "peeled", the manufacturer selects the stones required for the millstone. The different pieces are classified according to their quality, taking into account hardness, grain, porosity, and color. At this stage, it is also necessary to take into account the milling system used in the country of dispatch, and the type of wheat produced in the region. Once the choice has been made, production begins with the center or "boitard", which is usually made in one piece. This must be very solid, especially for the current millstone, as it is at this level that the casing on which the millstone is suspended is fixed. Around the boitard, the tiles are arranged and fixed with plaster or cement, and chiseled to fit together sufficiently. A wheel of this type is generally made up of two to six quarters. "When the job is done and the blocks match, the worker adjusts them by cementing them with Portland cement, sometimes with a paste of Spanish white and oil that hardens with age, and clamps the whole with iron hoops". On the other side of the working surface, the back of the millstone, or "counter-molding", is surrounded by a strip of sheet metal serving as temporary formwork. To give the millstone the necessary weight and thickness, it is reloaded with small stones embedded in fine concrete, into which are inserted cast-iron balancing boxes, which may contain lead if necessary.

==== Edge mill ====
Horizontal use of the millstone is generally associated with milling. When the millstone is "upright", i.e. on its edge, it is used for grinding, crushing, or milling operations. In this configuration, the nether millstone is fixed by its eyebolt to a vertical mast located centrally on the nether millstone which acts as a pivot. Depending on the size of the installation, and to maintain the verticality of the mast, its upper part may be attached to a beam overhanging the mill. The current millstone is rotated either " by means of force", or more often, in a riding hall. In this way, the mill is driven by a double movement, turning on itself while pivoting around the mast, as in the Roman trapetum. In this type of device, the millstone is monolithic or made up of a paved or even masonry surface. Depending on the product to be processed, the millstone may be slightly concave, with a rim around the periphery to avoid dispersing the crushed material.

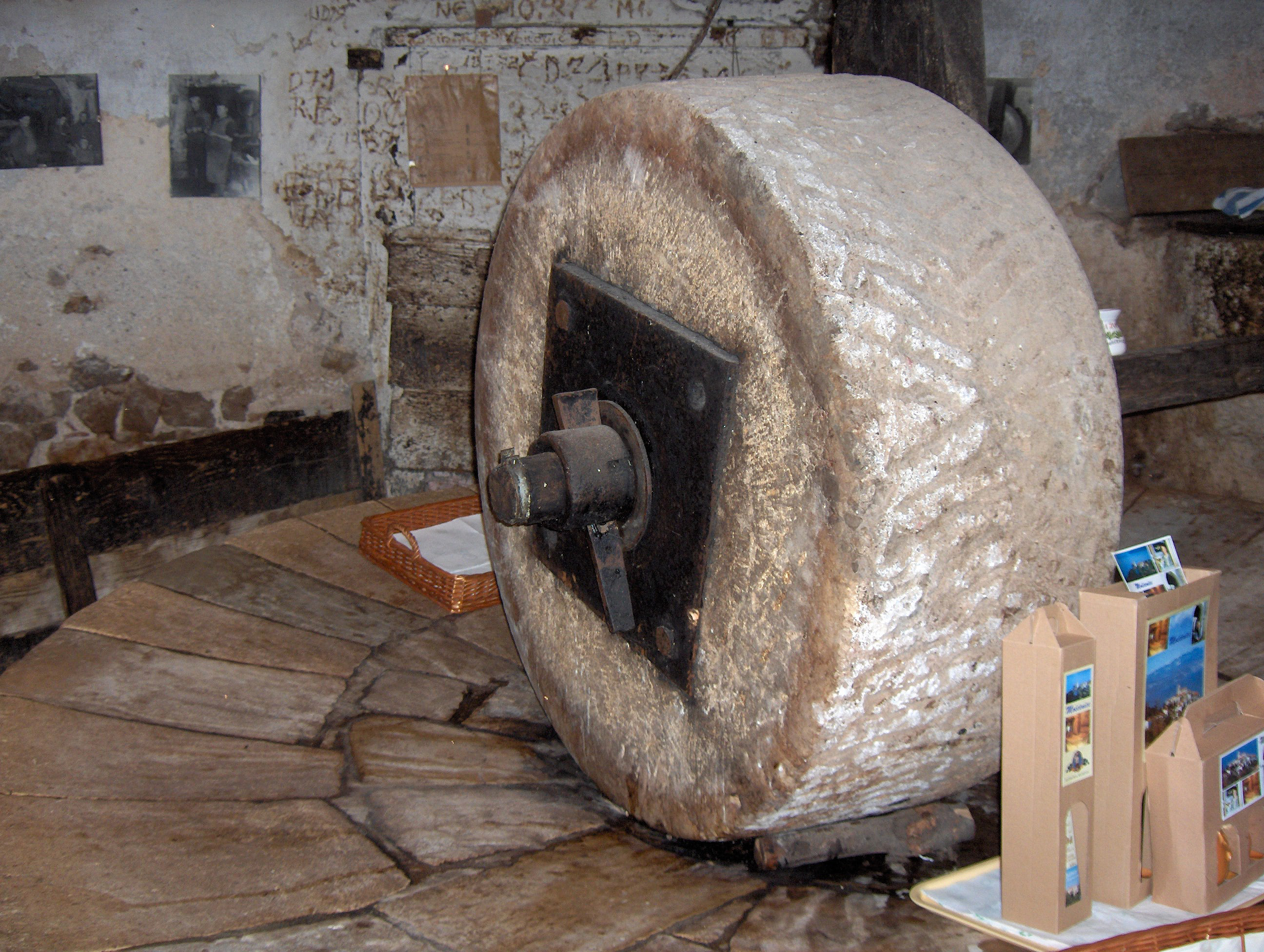
Olive mill - The spar through the eyelet is held in place by a dowel and is used to turn the current millstone.

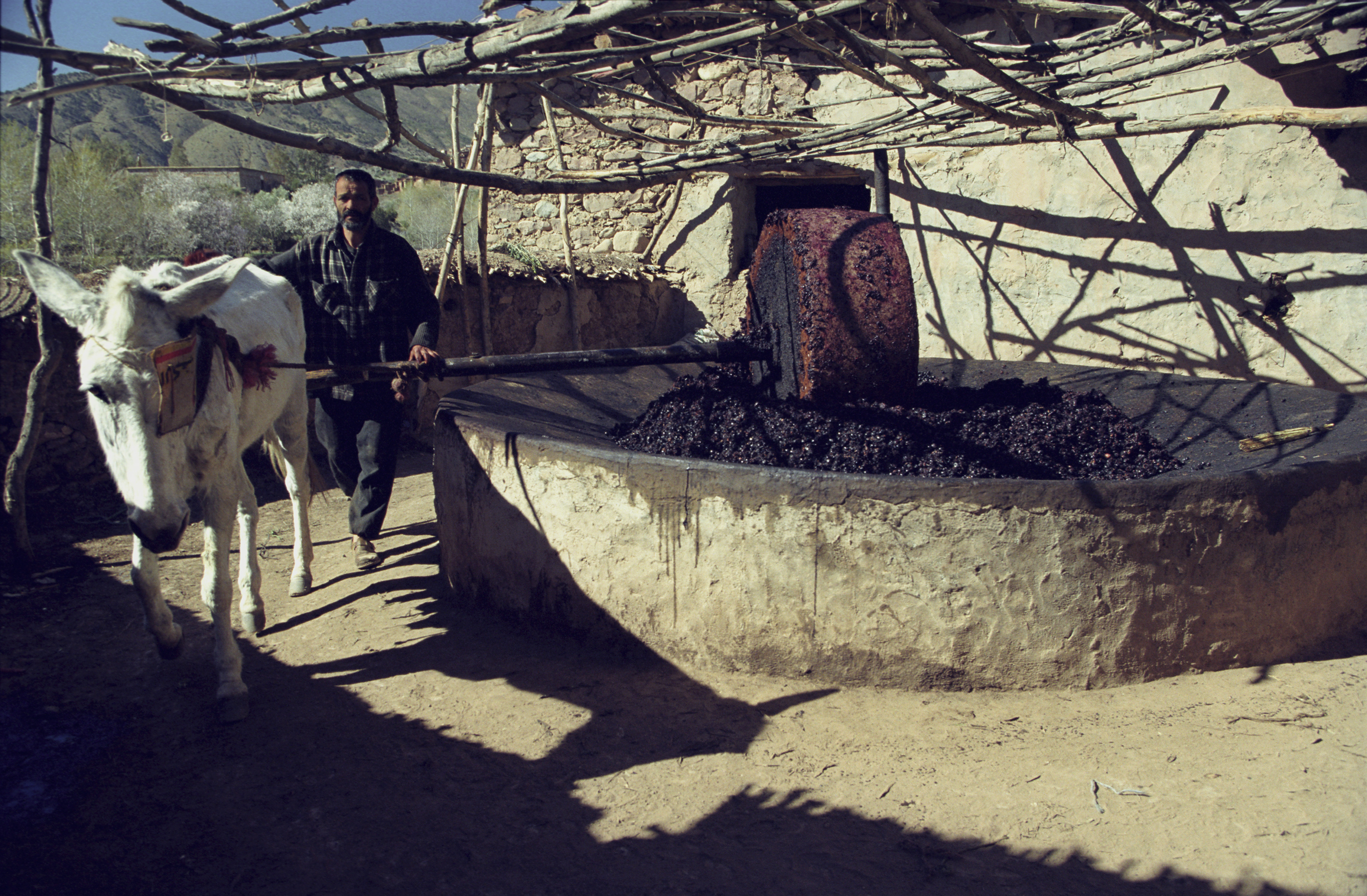
Olive mill. High Atlas

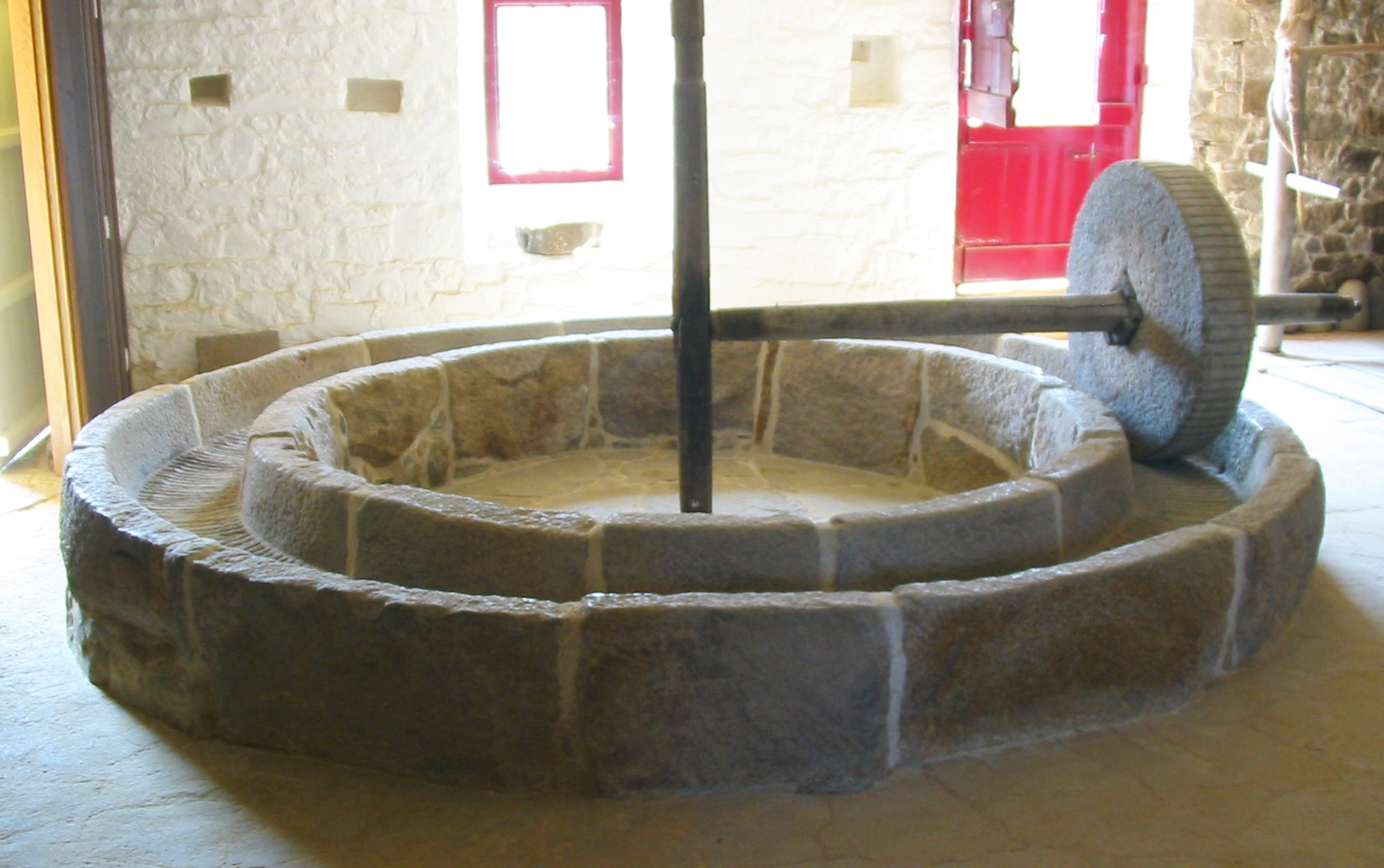
"Apple lathe" driven by a horse. Ring-shaped trough serving as a lying millstone. The Elms, Jersey

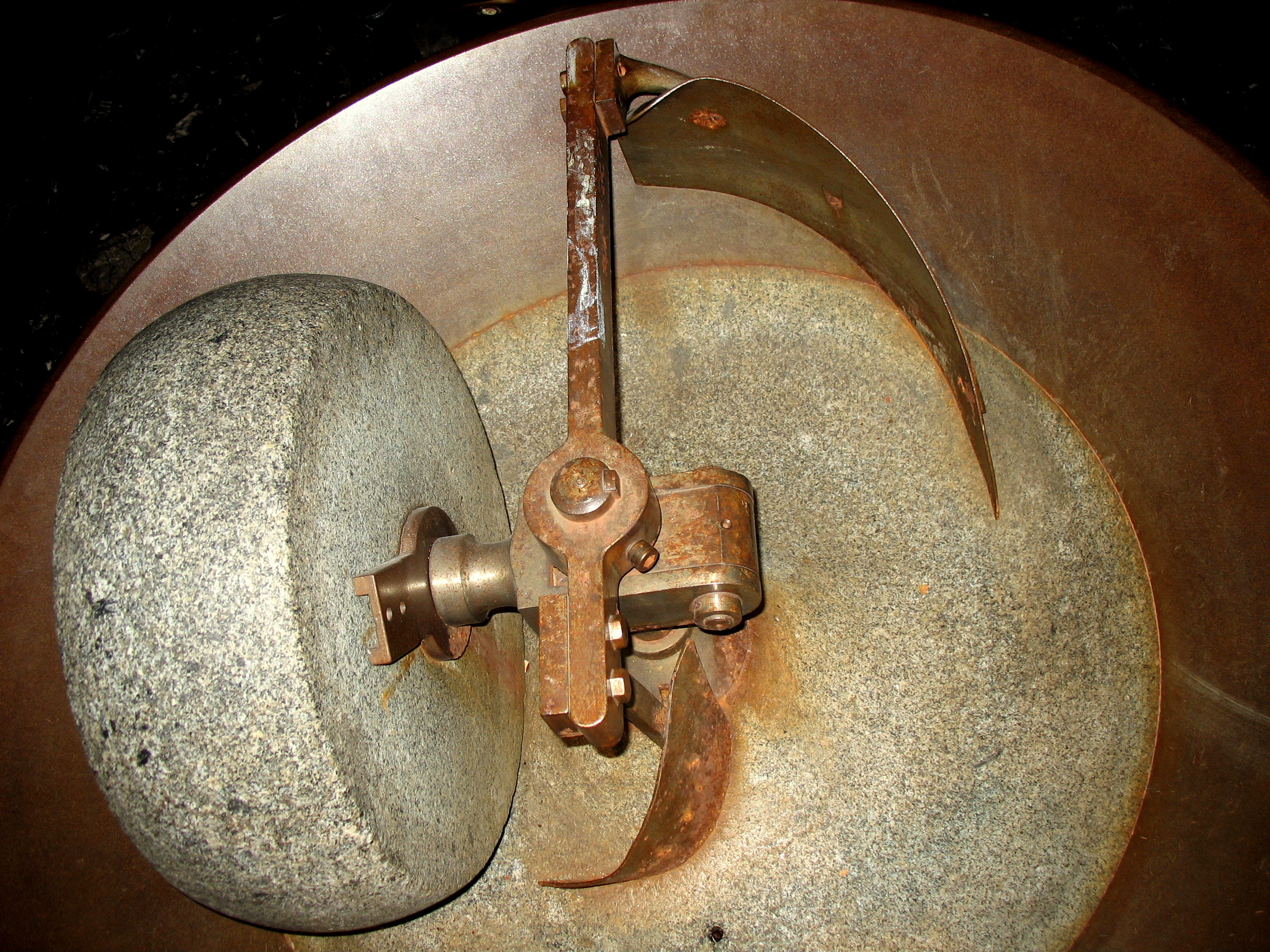
Old Millstone equipped with windrow ploughs, used to grind cocoa beans

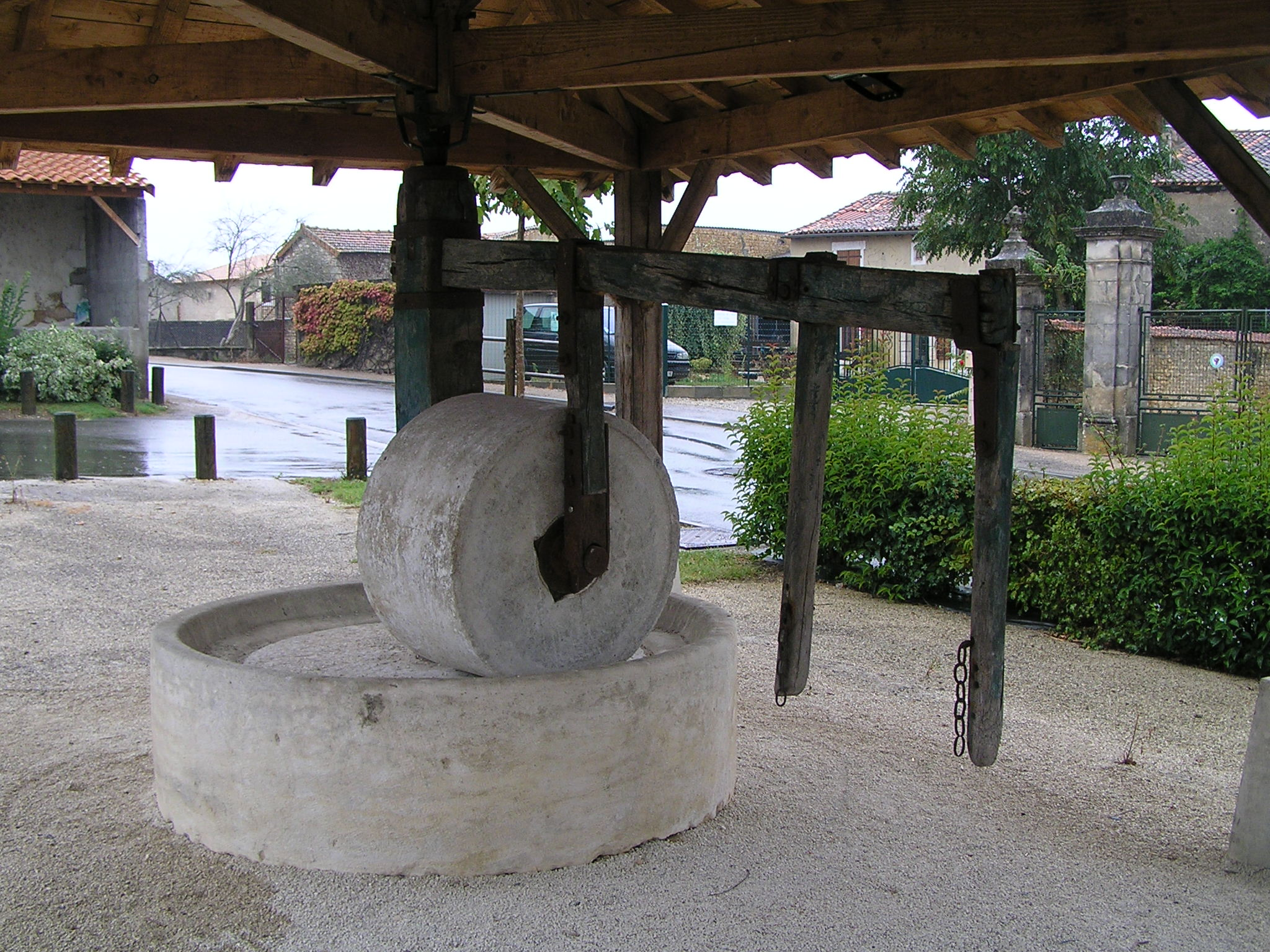
Millstone and riding hall - Agris (Charente)

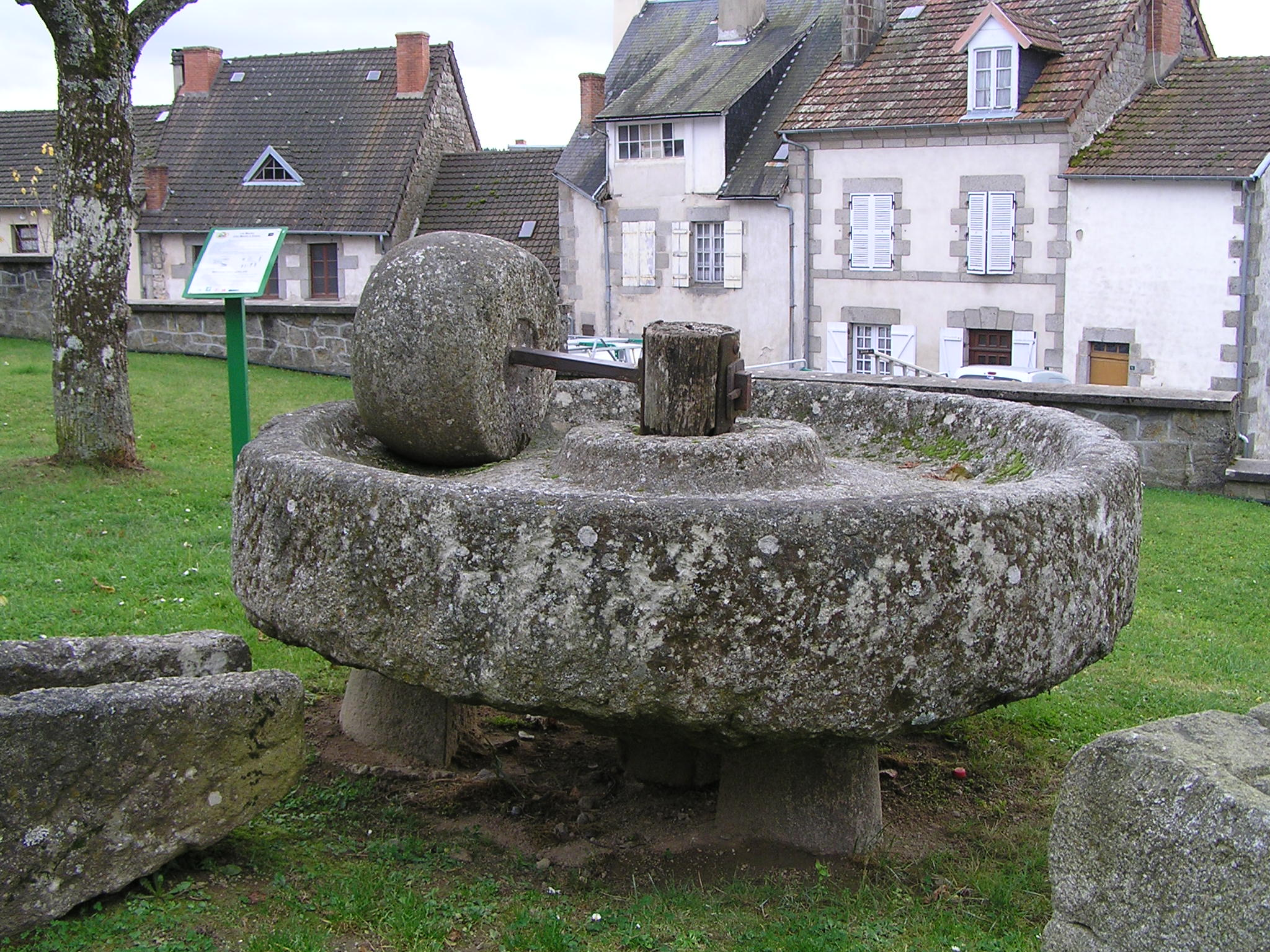
Millstone and oil press - Crocq (Creuse)

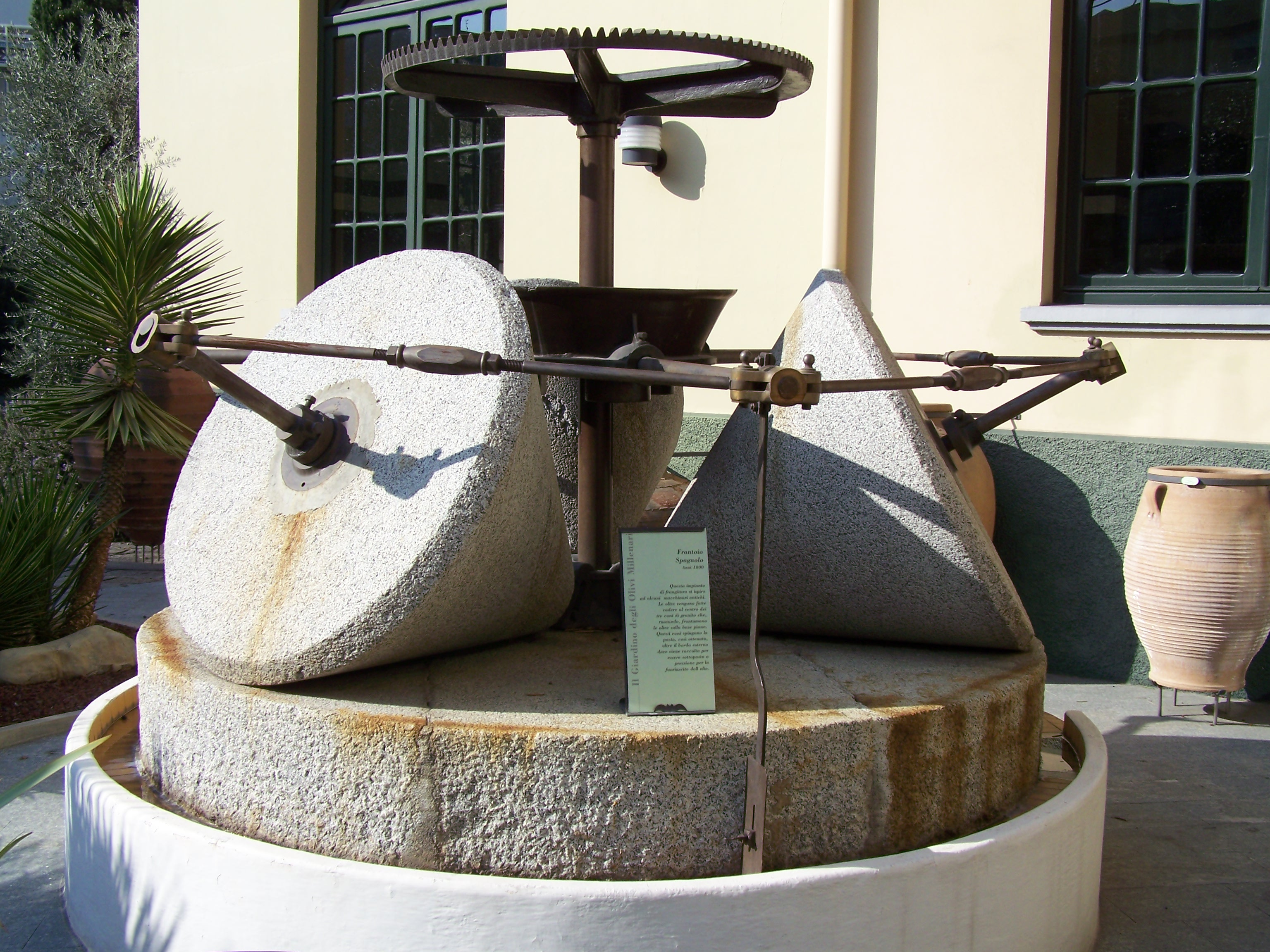
Olive mill with conical millstones (Spain)

== Materials ==
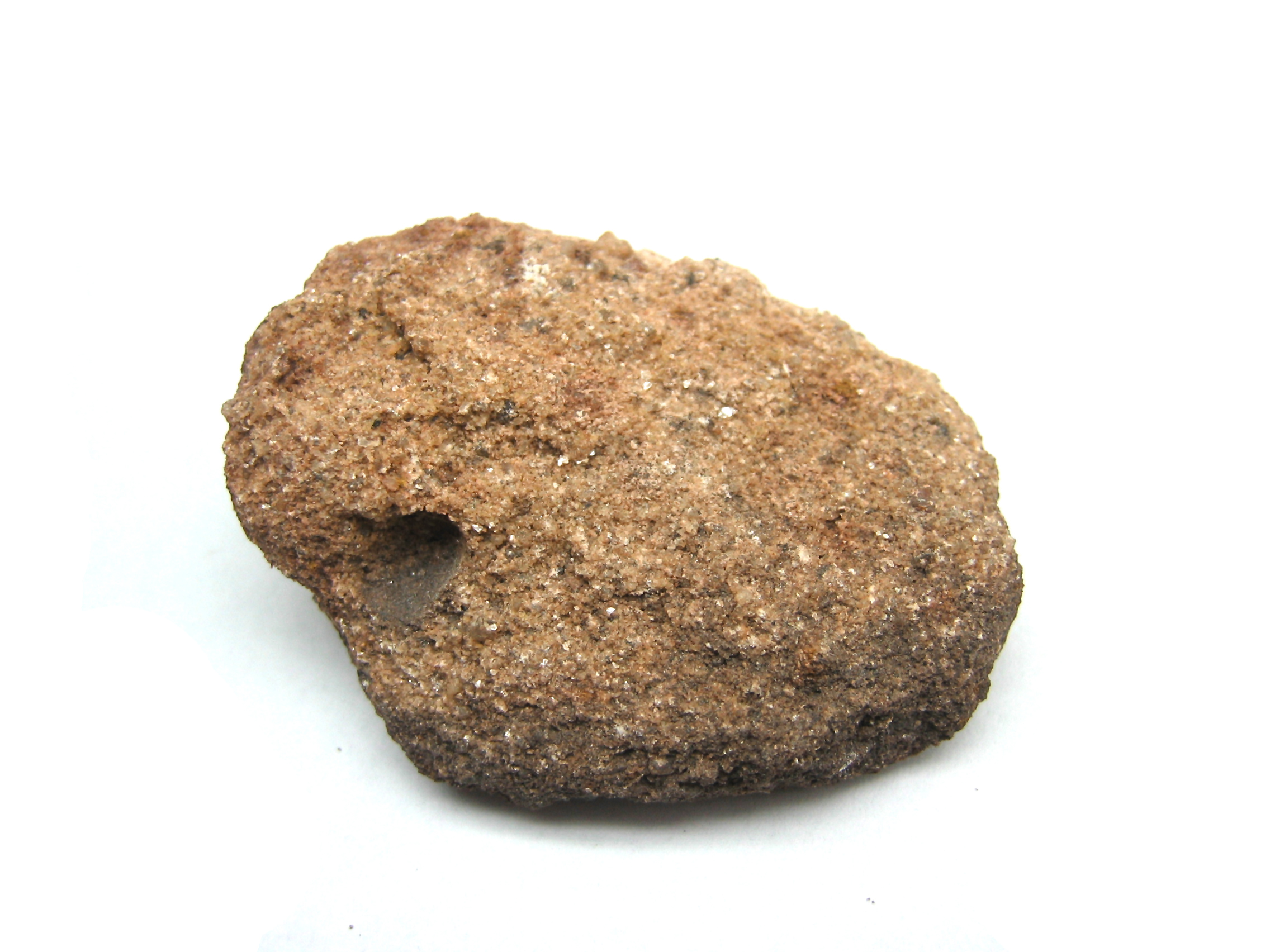
Piece of sandstone approx. 4 cm

In common language, "millstone" refers to any type of rock that may have been used in a mill, whereas in the geological sense, true "millstone" is defined as a siliceous accident in a sedimentary basin.

The type of stone most suitable for making millstones is a siliceous rock called burrstone (or buhrstone), an open-textured, porous but tough, fine-grained sandstone, or a silicified, fossiliferous limestone. In some sandstones, the cement is calcareous.

On a historical scale, it seems that most types of rock have been used in milling. Among the sedimentary rocks of potential use are limestone and sandstone. The latter soon emerged as the stones of choice, with porosities that make them easy to shape and extraction that can be facilitated by bedding between clay interbeds. It wasn't until the 15th century that millstones stricto sensu began to be quarried, a practice that became widespread in the 18th century.

Deep-lying magmatic rocks, such as granite, are widespread, but were ultimately little used for millstone manufacture, probably due to their low porosity and the presence of black mica, which rapidly alters to form iron oxides. Basalt was widely used in Germany (Eifel), but is not widespread in France, with the exception of the Évenos volcano in Provence; other examples include the basalt millstones of the Agde volcano, and those of the Sainte Magdeleine volcano at La Môle, not far from Cogolin.

Limestones are generally porous, with medium to low compressive strengths, so "classic" limestones seem to have been quickly abandoned in favor of better stones. Although very fine-grained, limestone polishes very quickly and needs to be re-cut frequently to keep the stones rough. Some sandstone limestones (Saint-Julien-des-Molières limestone) can have very good compressive strength (over 100 MPa).

Sandstone rocks (sandstones and microconglomerates up to 1 cm) are the preferred material for millstones. Analysis of production sites shows that they can be limestone-cemented sandstones, silica-cemented sandstones, or even slightly metamorphosed sandstones.

Limestone-cemented sandstones, such as Alpine molasses, are widespread. They have medium porosities (6 to 12%), medium compressive strength (35 MPa), often coarse grain size, and variable silica content.

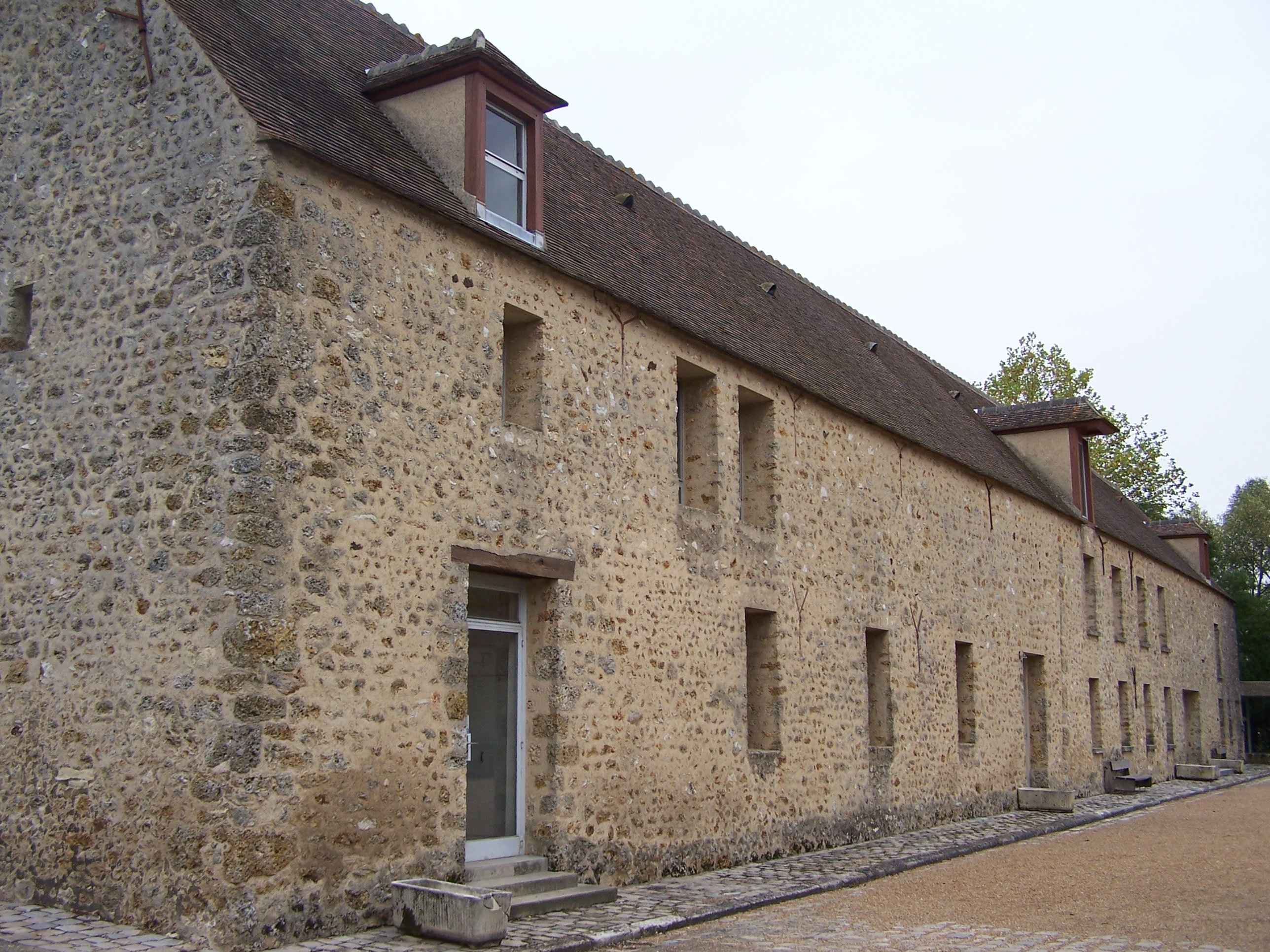
House built in gritstone - Élancourt

A very good millstone is generally rich in silica: the higher the percentage, the stronger the rock, silica being the hardest common mineral on the Earth's surface. The same is true of sandstone with siliceous cement, where the percentage of silica is high because both the grains and the cement are siliceous in nature. However, they don't necessarily make good millstones, like Vosges sandstone, which has a rather fine grain and traces of iron.

Slightly metamorphosed sandstones often have very low porosity (around 2%) due to tectonic compression, resulting in somewhat compact sandstones. Compressive strength can be very high (over 100 MPa), as in the case of Arros sandstone, despite an average silica percentage.

Finally, millstones in the geological sense are porous stones, which play a role not only for cutting, but also undoubtedly for grinding. These include stones such as those from La Ferté-sous-Jouarre, with high porosity (20%), compressive strength of 80 MPa, and medium grain. Corfélix stones have exceptional compressive strength on the order of solid basalt (190 MPa), 98% silica, fairly coarse grain, and medium to high porosity.

In a nutshell, for the rock mechanics, a good millstone has three fundamental characteristics:

- insensitivity to alteration, whether through dissolution (gypsum), the action of moisture (as in the case of limestone), or the chemical action of water, as in the case of granite mica or Vosges sandstone (presence of iron);
- heterogeneity on a millimeter and centimeter scale is a quality that provides crushing asperities and evacuating channels, like hard punches held together by a slightly less hard but tenacious cement, which is not generally a characteristic of limestone;
- high porosity, which facilitates quarrying, as it is easier to introduce cutting tools into porous rock than into solid rock, but also undoubtedly facilitates grinding.

The following table presents some examples of geological and petrophysical data obtained from sites used for the production of millstones:

Production site	Rock type	SiO_{2} %	CaO %	Density (t/m^{3})	Porosity %	Rc (compression) Mpa
Mont-Saint-Martin	Breccia	-	54,2	2,36	11,1 to 11,7	Medium to low
Saint-Julien-des-Molières	Marine honeycomb limestone with quartz-feldspar inclusions	33,8	35,6	2,65 to 3,39	0,9 to 1,1	130 to 133
Les Écouges	Late Cretaceous microconglomeratic sandstone	40,6	28,1	2,35	11	37 to 44
Le Bézu	Siliceous cement sandstone	98,6	-	2,35	11,9	23 to 26
Pareil	Late Cretaceous fine-grained sandstone and carbonate cement	54,7	22,7	2,6	1,7	124
Tarterel	Gritstone	98,3	-	2,1 to 2,4	17,5 to 21,4	38 to 100
Bois de l'Homme Blanc	Gritstone	97,8	-	2,4	10,3 to 10,6	139 to 240

Millstones used in Britain were of several types:

- Derbyshire Peak stones of grey Millstone Grit, cut from one piece, used for grinding barley; imitation Derbyshire Peak stones are used as decorative signposts at the boundaries of the Peak District National Park. Derbyshire Peak stones wear quickly and are typically used to grind animal feed since they leave stone powder in the flour, making it undesirable for human consumption.
- French buhrstones, used for finer grinding. French Burr comes from the Marne Valley in northern France. The millstones are not cut from one piece, but built up from sections of quartz cemented together, backed with plaster and bound with shrink-fit iron bands. Slots in the bands provide attachments for lifting. In southern England the material was imported as pieces of rock, only assembled into complete millstones in local workshops. It was necessary to balance the completed runner stone with lead weights applied to the lighter side.
- Composite stones, built up from pieces of emery, were introduced during the nineteenth century; they were found to be more suitable for grinding at the higher speeds available when auxiliary engines were adopted.

In Europe, a further type of millstone was used. These were uncommon in Britain, but not unknown:

- Cullen stones (stones from Cologne), a form of black lava quarried in the Rhine Valley at Mayen near Cologne, Germany.
- Lava stones from Orvieto (Italy), Mount Etna and Hyblaean Mounts (Sicily), and Pantelleria island, were used by the Romans.

== Patterning ==
Main ways to design the millstone's furrow.

The surface of a millstone is divided by deep grooves called furrows into separate flat areas called lands. Spreading away from the furrows are smaller grooves called feathering or cracking. The grooves provide a cutting edge and help to channel the ground flour out from the stones.

The furrows and lands are arranged in repeating patterns called harps. A typical millstone will have six, eight or ten harps. The pattern of harps is repeated on the face of each stone, when they are laid face to face the patterns mesh in a kind of "scissoring" motion creating the cutting or grinding function of the stones. When in regular use stones need to be dressed periodically, that is, re-cut to keep the cutting surfaces sharp.

The major challenge is to limit the heat generated by the pressure of the millstones on the ground flour. In addition to denaturing the flour (browning), this overheating, and any sparks generated by the rubbing of the stones, could cause an explosion in the mill, whose atmosphere is charged with fine flour particles. A complex system of spokes had to be devised to ventilate the gap between the millstones and, at the same time, progressively push the material from the eyelet to the peripheral rabbet. Wheat millstones have long been used to grind cereals in a single pass. We had to find the best way of extracting the flour and cleaning the bran, ensuring that it was unbroken and free of flour.

The rim of the millstone is made up of fine grooves called feathering or cracking.

For the manufacture of the millstone, the customer had to specify the diameter, the size of the eye and the direction of the furrows. Occasionally, a miller was mistaken about the direction of the furrows, as extracts from correspondence testify: "You tell us that your top wheels must be rifled to turn counter-clockwise. We therefore understand that these millstones must be radiused to turn counter-clockwise, i.e. in the opposite direction to that in which the sun seems to revolve around the earth". Despite all the precautions taken at the time of ordering, it sometimes happened that, in the event of a dispute, we were obliged to travel to change the direction: "we sent a workman a hundred leagues from here to unravel, straighten and re-radiate two pairs of millstone; the profit is eaten twice".

Between the furrows, the millstone is covered with fine grooves called feathering or cracking, also cut into the stone, to make it more aggressive and thus better able to grind the grains. They run along the edge of the millstone, over a width of around 15 cm, to form the rabbet. Regularly, the furrows need to be redone with a special hammer: the millstone is said to need to be rhabillaged or rebatted. This operation must be carried out after grinding around 50 tons of wheat. Special steel hardening techniques enabled certain companies, such as Kupka in Germany, to produce picks and hammers that were particularly appreciated by millstone reworkers. During the operation, the light blows emitted a cloud of siliceous dust that could cause lung ailments in specialized workers. In addition, the cutting of millstones led to professional tattoos, with steel particles from the tools embedded under the dermis. Eye diseases were also common.

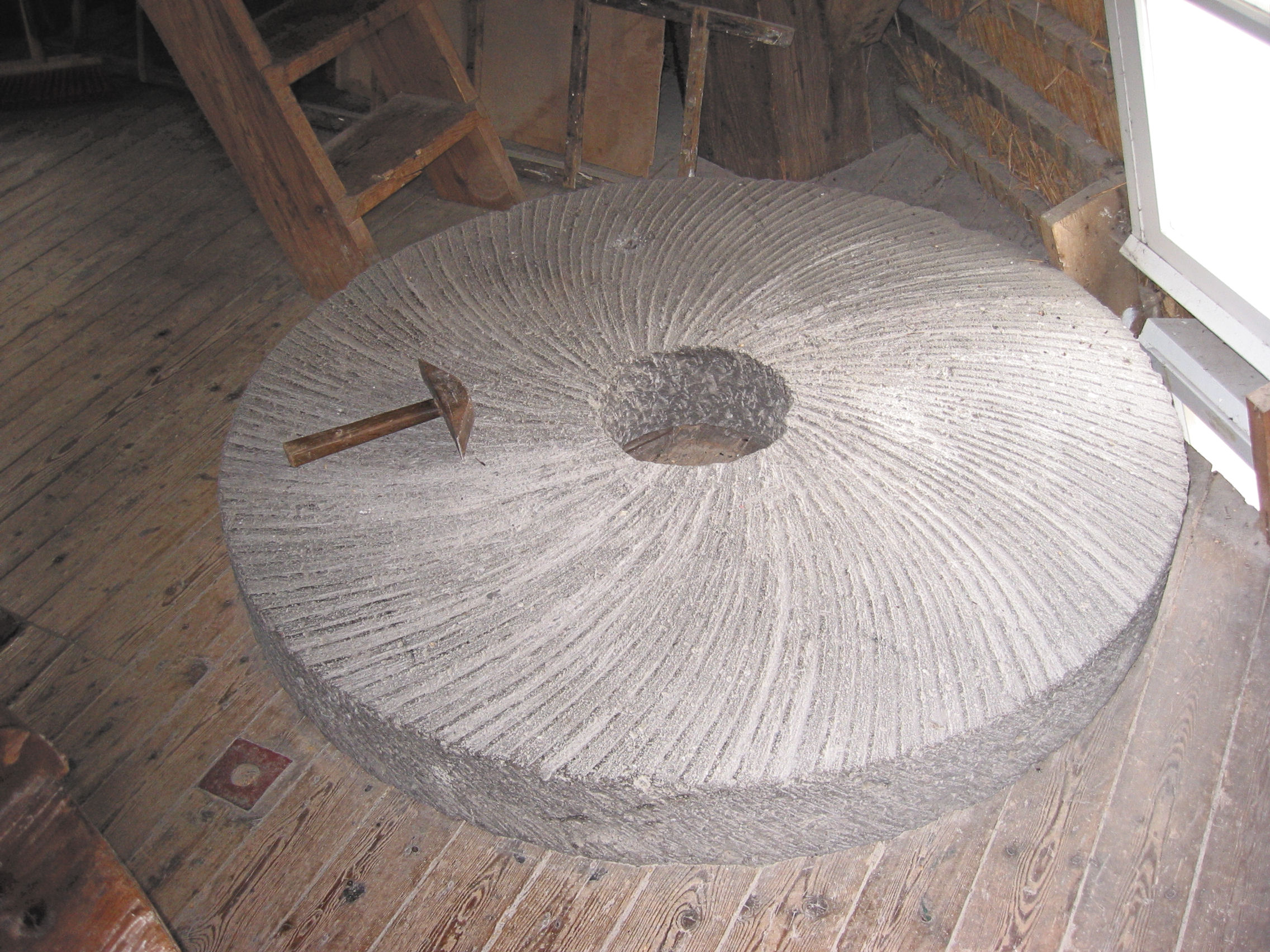
Millstone in Walderveen, Gelderland, Netherlands

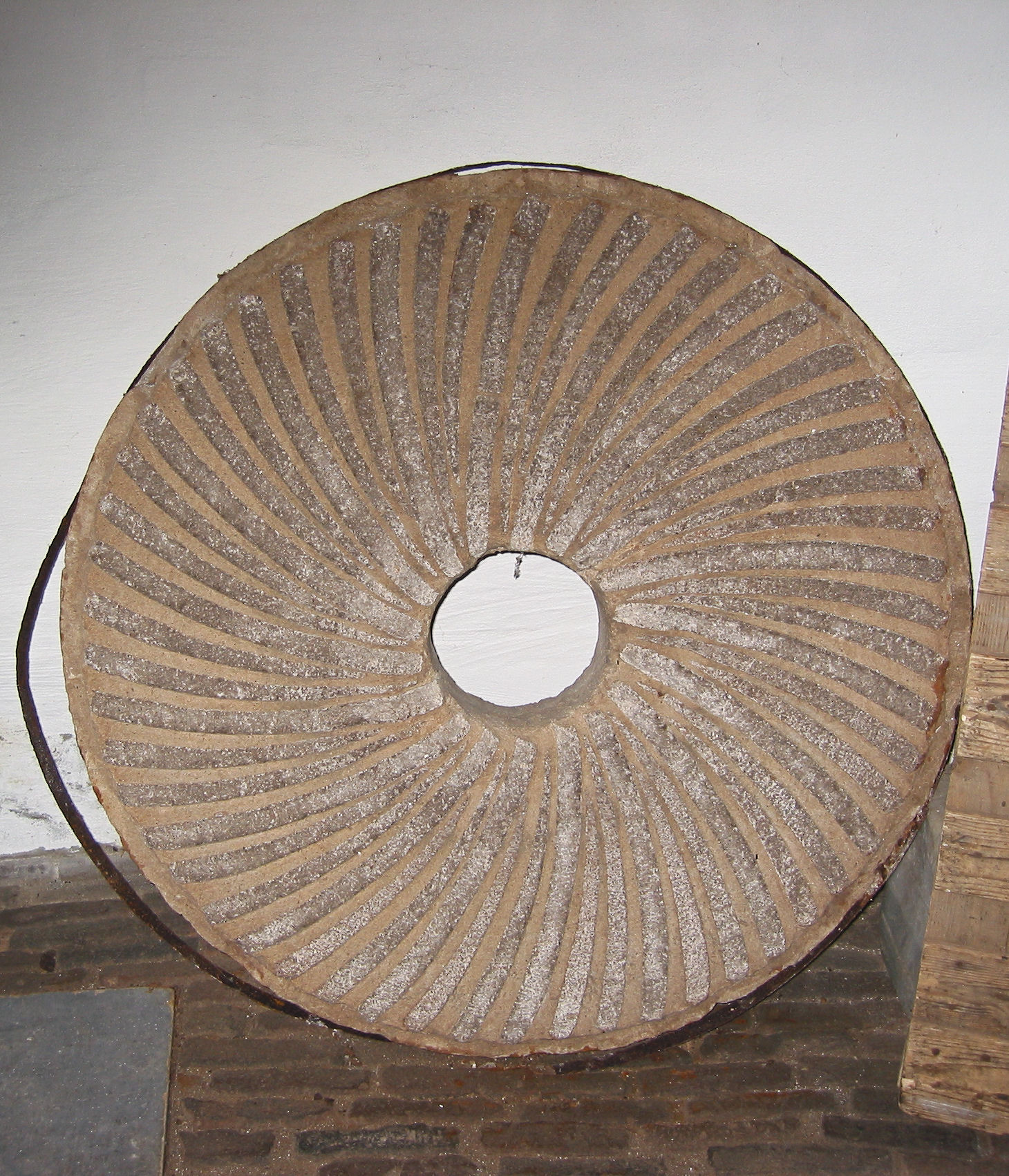

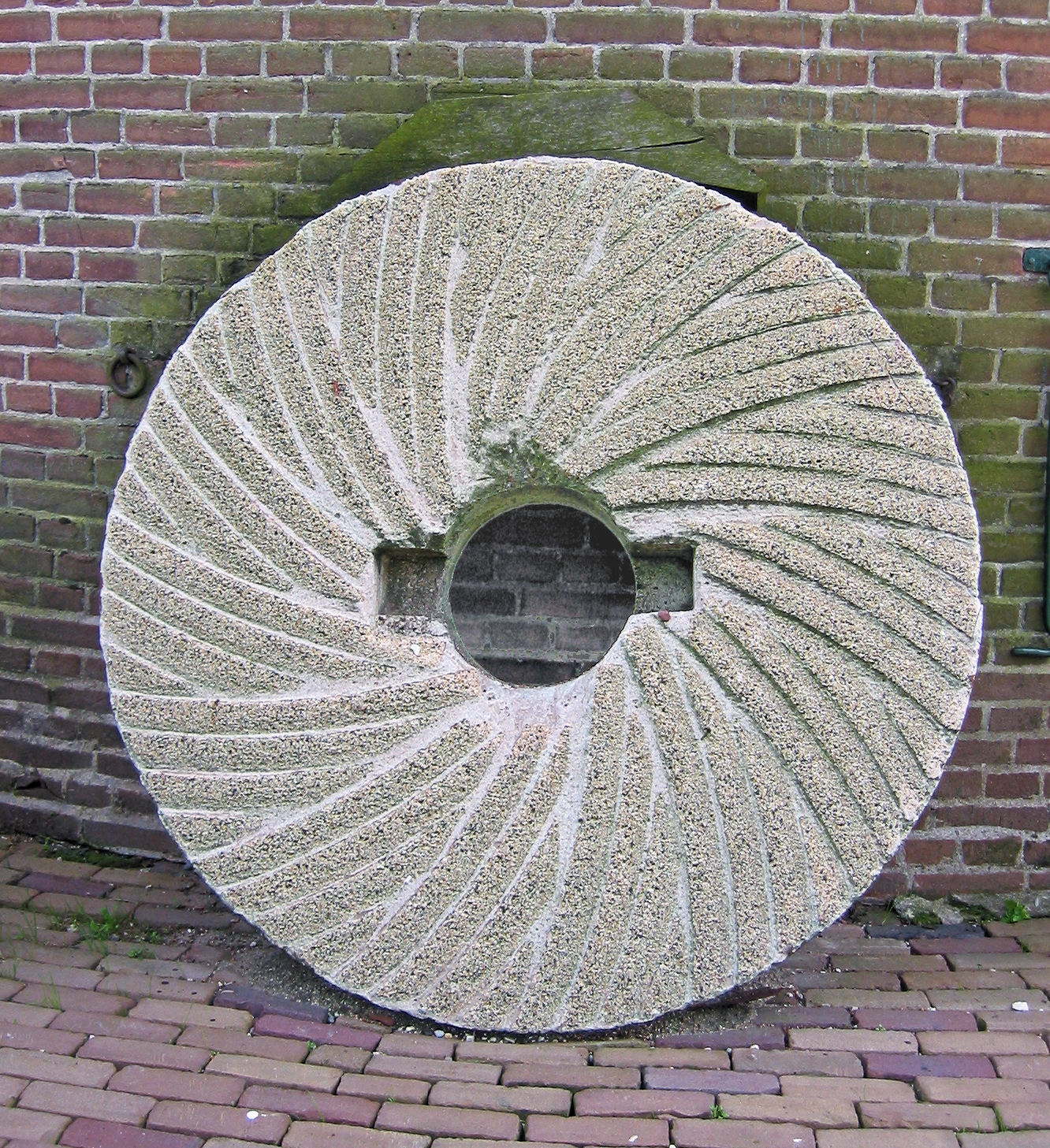

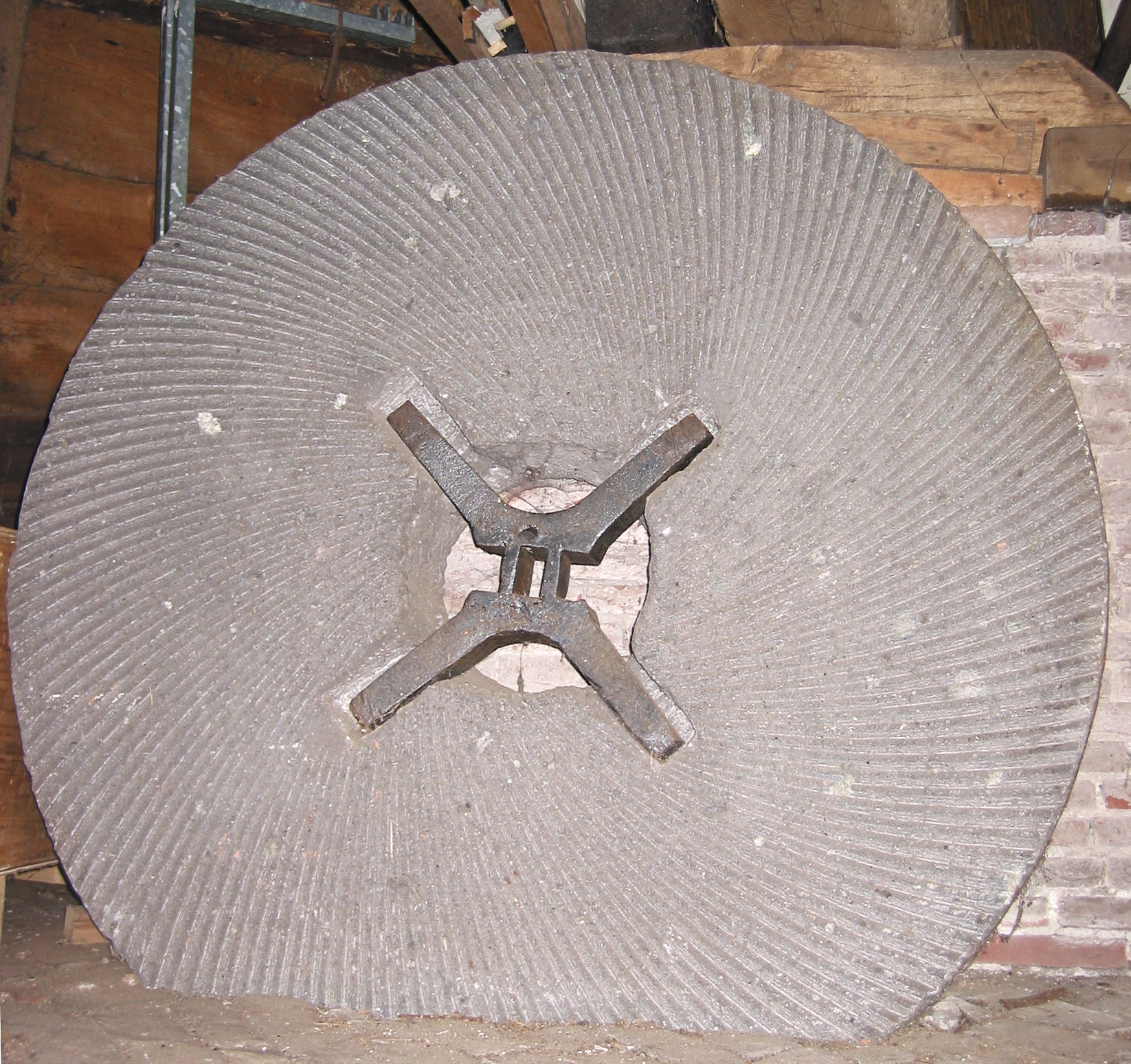
Millstone and shackle, X-shaped metal part

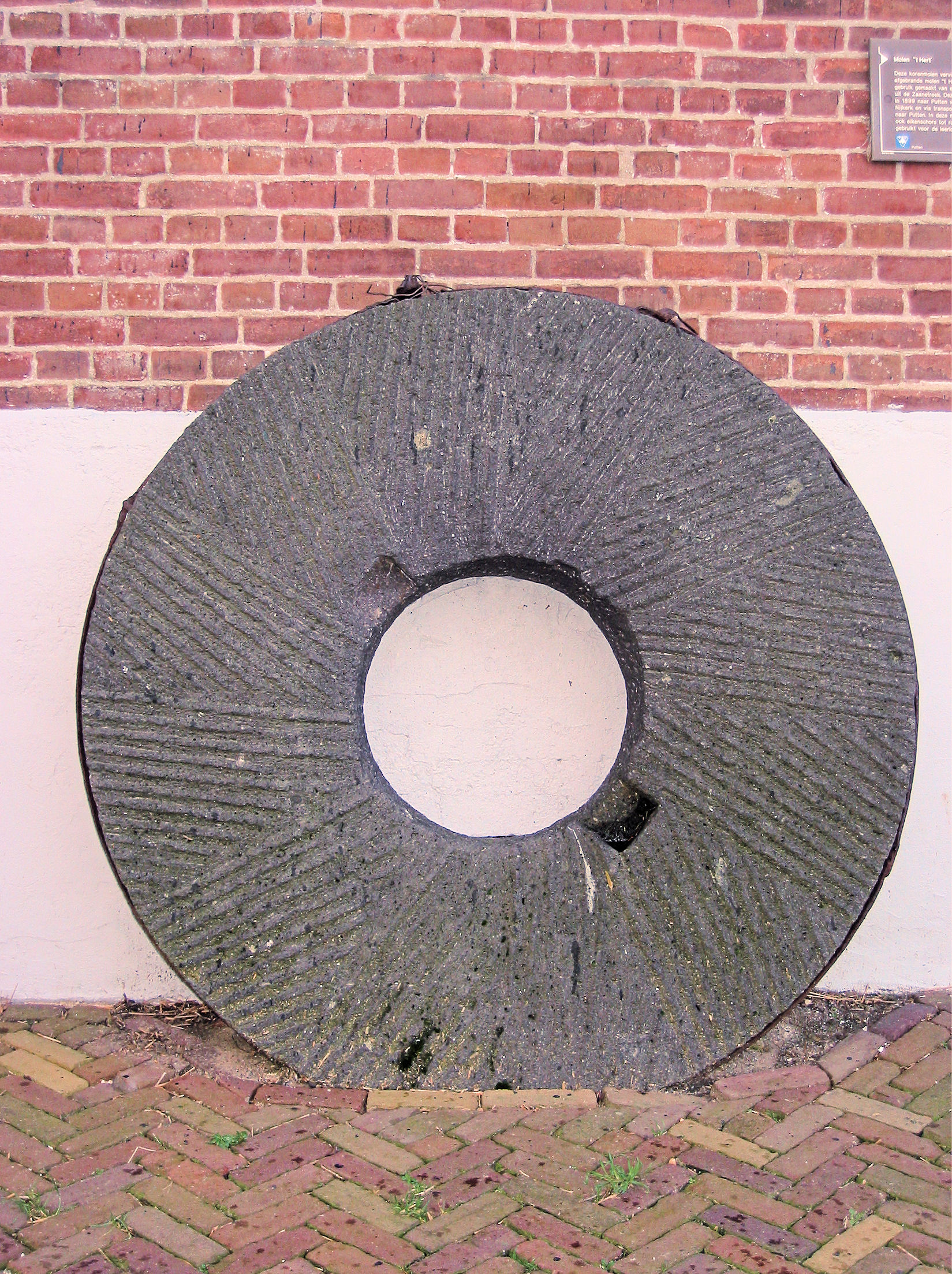

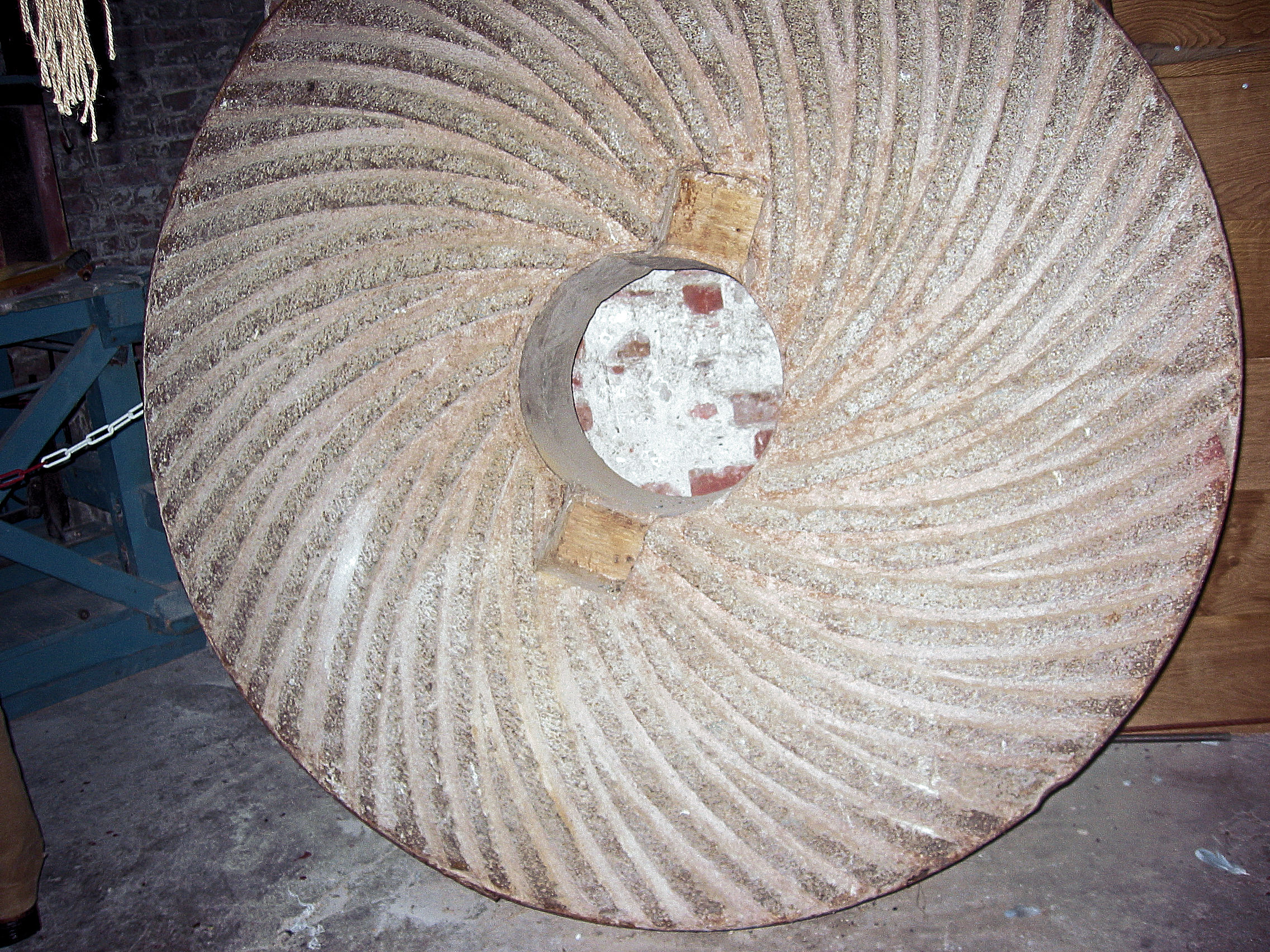

== Grinding with millstones ==
1. Hopper 2. Shoe 3. Crook string 4. Shoe handle 5. Damsel 6. Eye 7. Runner stone 8. Bedstone 9. Rind 10. Mace 11. Stone spindle 12. Millstone support 13. Wooden beam 14. Casing (Tentering gear not shown)

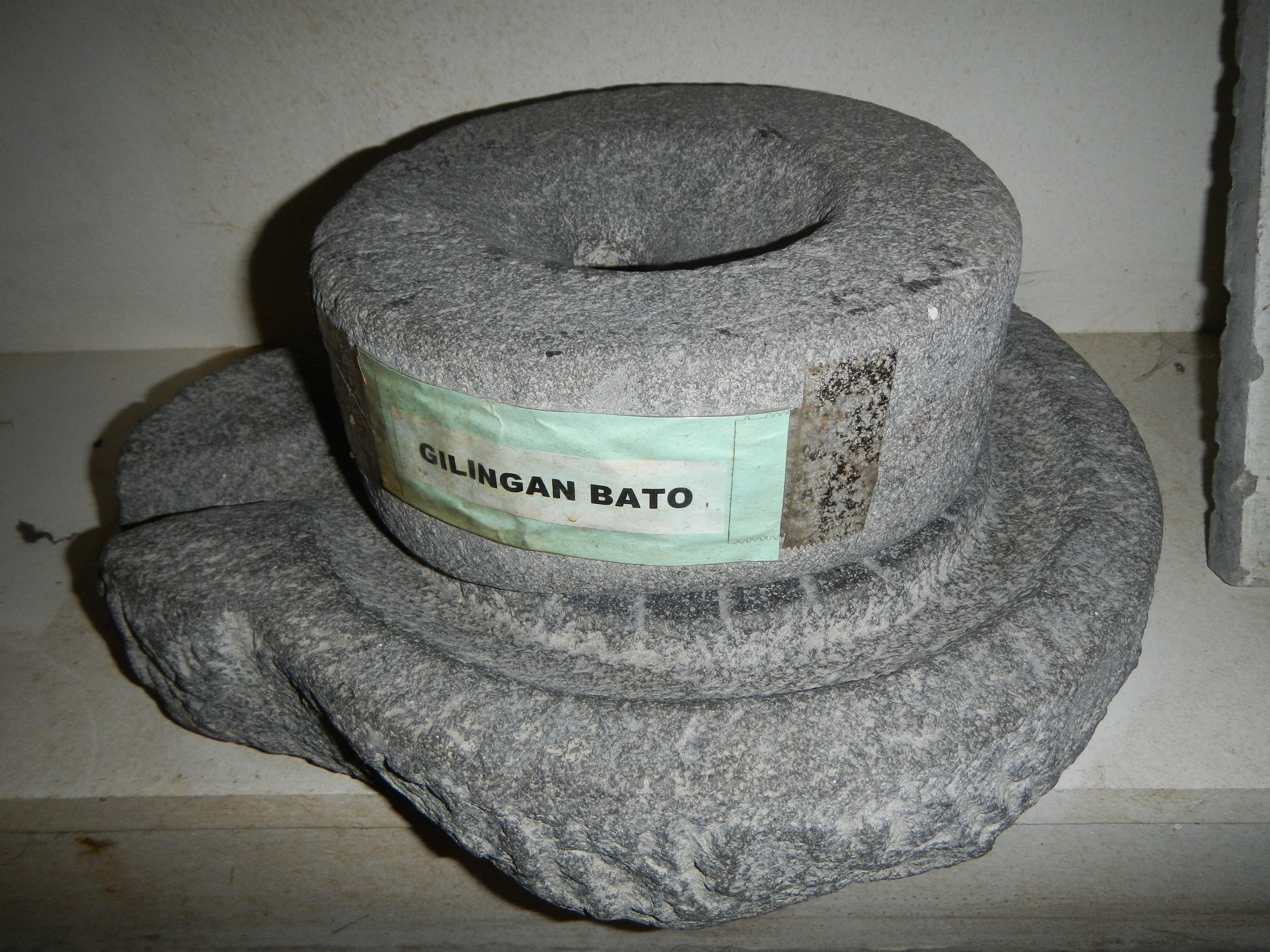
Gilingan bato (ancient rice millstone, Minalin, Pampanga, Philippines)

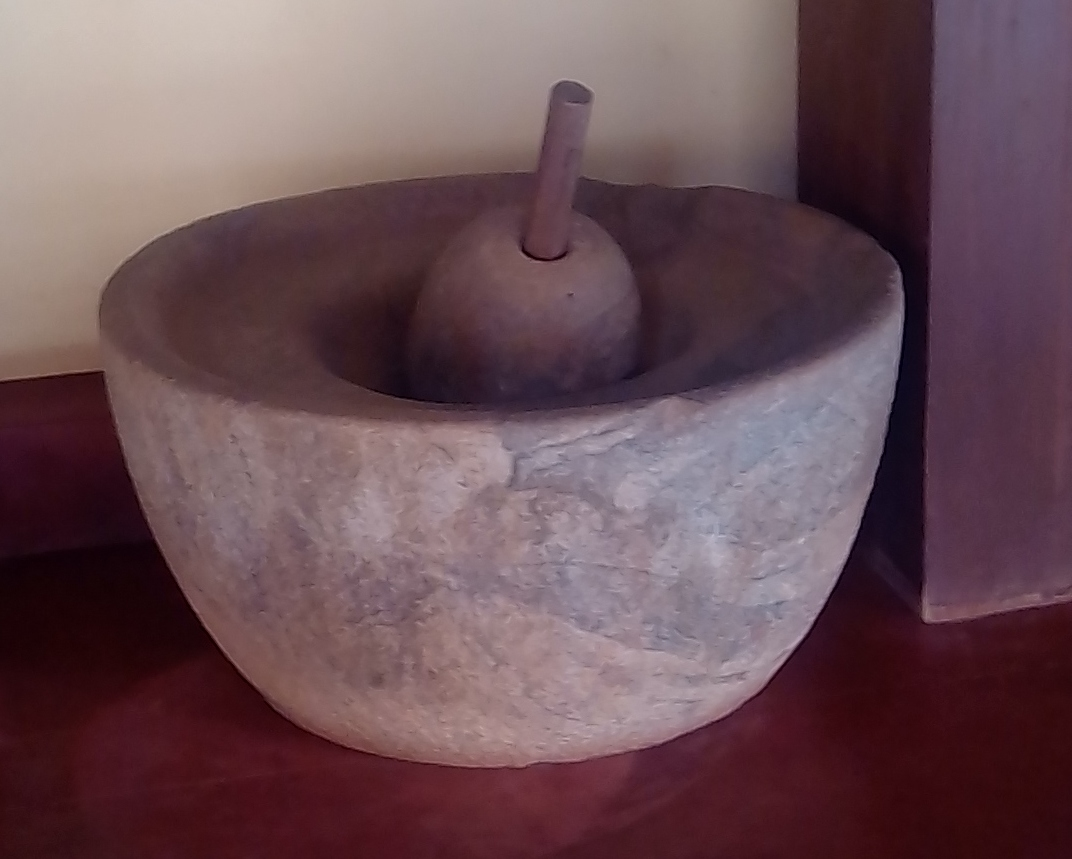
Old Indian grinding stone used for making batter for Dosa, Idli etc.

Grain is fed by gravity from the hopper into the feed-shoe. The shoe is agitated by a shoe handle running against an agitator (damsel) on the stone spindle, the shaft powering the runner stone. This mechanism regulates the feed of grain to the millstones by making the feed dependent on the speed of the runner stone. From the feed shoe the grain falls through the eye, the central hole, of the runner stone and is taken between the runner and the bed stone to be ground. The flour exits from between the stones from the side. The stone casing prevents the flour from falling on the floor, instead it is taken to the meal spout from where it can be bagged or processed further. The runner stone is supported by the rind, a cross- shaped metal piece, on the spindle. The spindle is carried by the tentering gear, a set of beams forming a lever system, or a screw jack, with which the runner stone can be lifted or lowered slightly and the gap between the stones adjusted. The weight of the runner stone is significant (up to 1,500 kilograms (3,300 lb)) and it is this weight combined with the cutting action from the porous stone and the patterning that causes the milling process.

Millstones for some water-powered mills (such as Peirce Mill) spin at about 125 rpm.

Especially in the case of wind-powered mills the turning speed can be irregular. Higher speed means more grain is fed to the stones by the feed-shoe, and grain exits the stones more quickly because of their faster turning speed. The miller has to reduce the gap between the stones so more weight of the runner presses down on the grain and the grinding action is increased to prevent the grain being ground too coarsely. It has the added benefit of increasing the load on the mill and so slowing it down. In the reverse case the miller may have to raise the runner stone if the grain is milled too thoroughly making it unsuitable for baking. In any case the stones should never touch during milling as this would cause them to wear down rapidly. The process of lowering and raising the runner stone is called tentering and lightering. In many windmills it is automated by adding a centrifugal governor to the tentering gear. Depending on the type of grain to be milled and the power available the miller may adjust the feed of grain to stones beforehand by changing the amount of agitation of the feed-shoe or adjusting the size of the hopper outlet. Milling by millstones is a one-step process in contrast with roller mills in modern mass production where milling takes place in many steps. It produces wholemeal flour which can be turned into white flour by sifting to remove the bran.

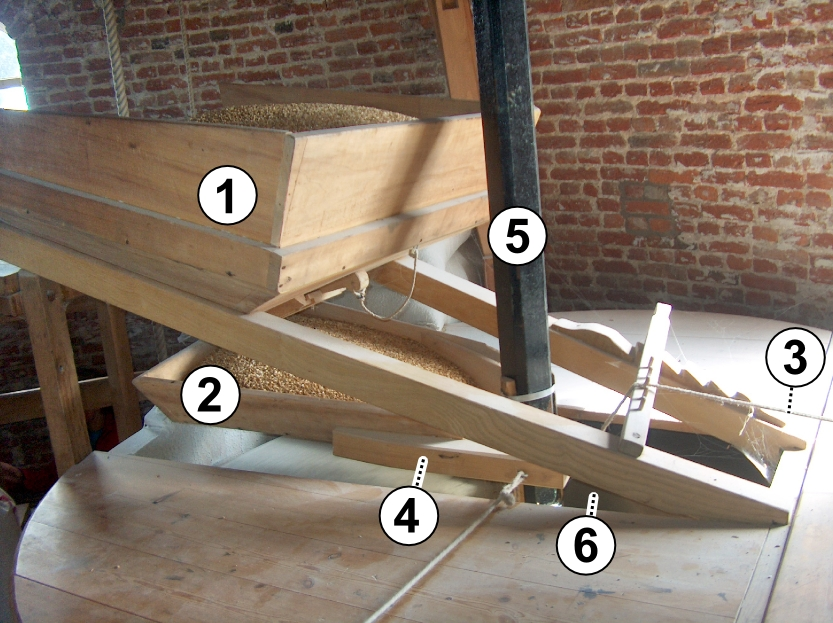
Millstone feeder

Principle of the grain feeding system

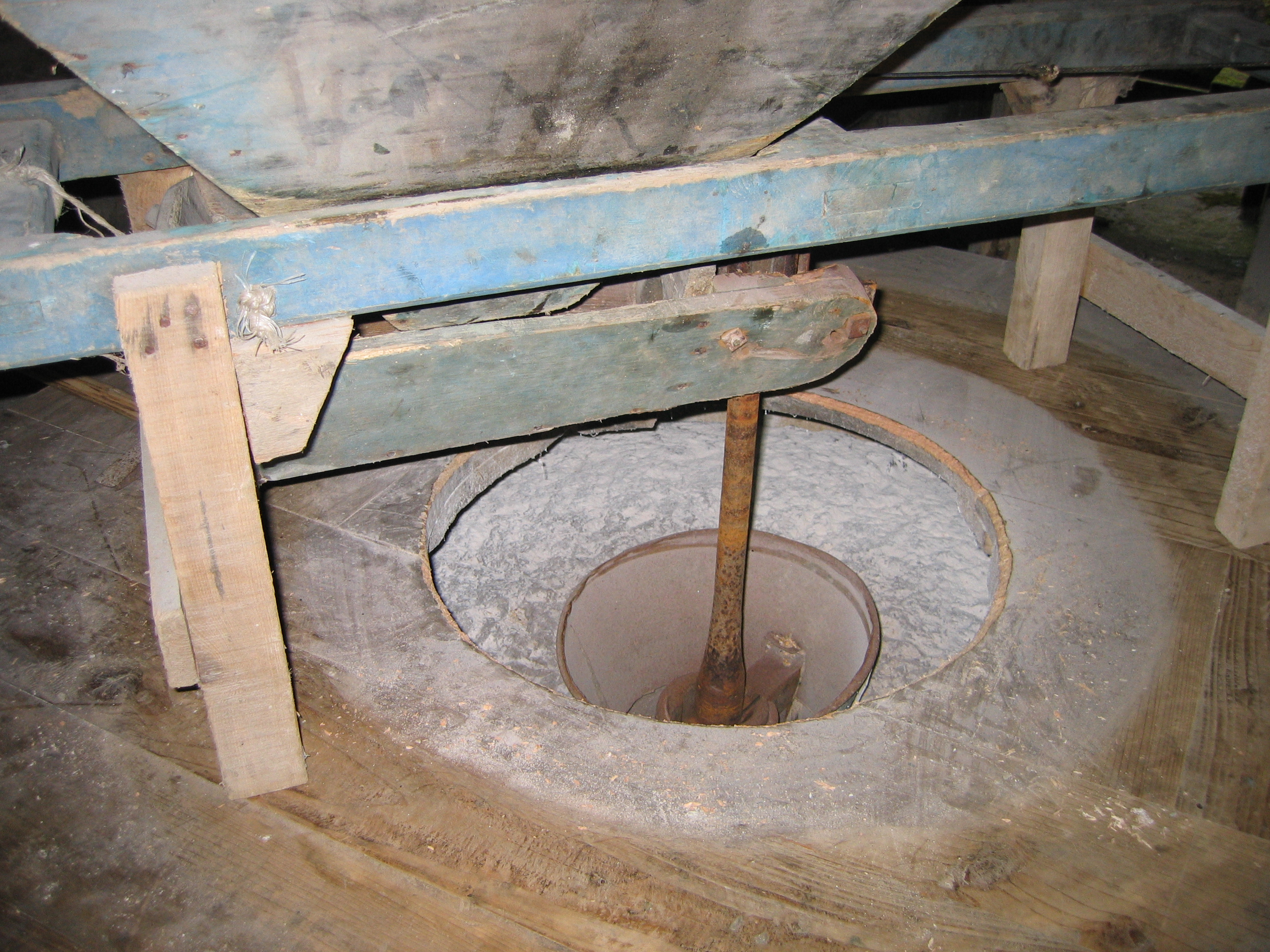
View from the eyelet

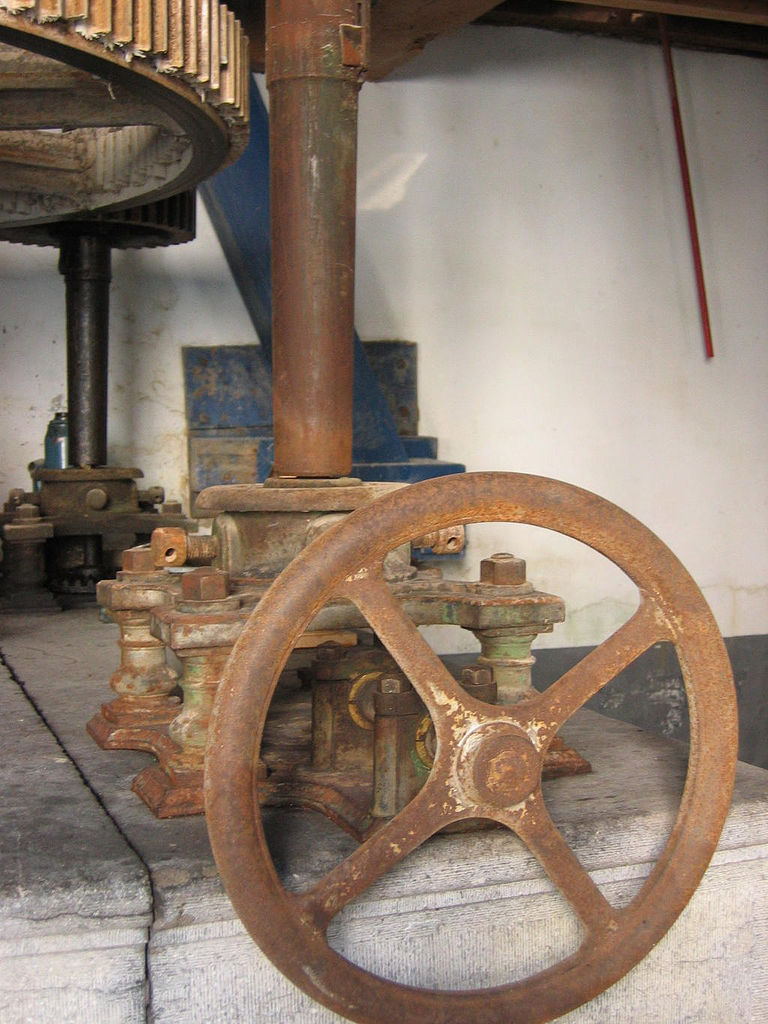
The dipping mechanism adjusts the distance between the two millstones (Gentinnes watermill - Belgium).

== Symbolism ==
=== Symbolism in the Bible ===
Millstones were often essential objects within a community. For that reason, they gain multiple symbolic meanings and symbolism within mythology, folklore, and the Bible. The Hebrew Bible admonishes (Deuteronomy 24:6): "No one shall take a lower millstone, nor an upper millstone, in pledge [for the payment of a debt], for that would be tantamount to taking away a life in pledge." The rabbis have explained that not only a millstone cannot be taken as security for a pledge, but anything in which the life of man depends cannot be taken as security for a pledge.

The Bible heavily utilized millstone symbolism within its various proverbs. A common one is the millstone's proverbial designation of something as a great weight, as seen in Matthew 18:6

But whoso shall offend one of these little ones which believe in me, it were better for him that a millstone were hanged about his neck, and that he were drowned in the depth of the sea.

Likewise, due to the exhausting physical labor associated with the earliest millstones, they were symbolic of hard work and accredited as a menial task given to the lowest form of a laborer. This is not the only symbolic meaning of millstones within the Bible; millstones were also used as a symbol of civilization, prosperity, and comfortable living.

=== Other symbolism ===
Out of the Bible, the millstone can be seen as a symbol of transformation, death, and rebirth. This is due to the strenuous amount of work and effort that goes into utilizing a millstone to grind grain into flour. Other symbolic meanings associated with millstones include fertility and abundance. In Korea, a practice existed in which the husband would use a millstone while his wife was in childbirth, hoping that he could share her pain. In both the Bible and folklore, the millstone can be associated with punishment. In some instances and stories, a millstone is used to harm an individual for their behavior. Examples of millstones being used to punish individuals can be seen in "The Juniper Tree" and Judges 9:53, where one is used to kill Abimelech by tossing it on his head.

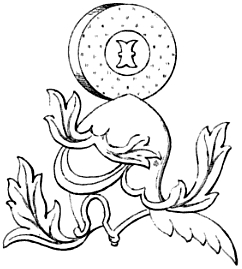
Millstone crest of John de Lisle, 2nd Baron Lisle (c.1318-1355), KG, drawn from his Garter stall plate in St George's Chapel, Windsor

=== Heraldry ===
In heraldry, as a demonstration of military bravado, a millstone features as the heraldic crest of John de Lisle, 2nd Baron Lisle (c.1318-1355), one of the founder knights of the Order of the Garter, as shown on his garter-plate in St George's Chapel, Windsor: A mill-stone argent pecked sable the inner circle and the rim of the second the fer-de-moline or. Thus symbolising super-human strength necessary to support such a weight atop his helmet.

In its more basic heraldic form it is a charge symbolising industry. The fer-de-moline ("mill-iron") or millrind, which attaches to the millstone and transfers to it the torque of the drive-shaft, is also a common heraldic charge, used as canting arms by families named Mills, Milles, Turner, etc.

A millstone in the arms of Höör, Sweden

A millstone in the arms of Askola, Finland

== Photo gallery ==
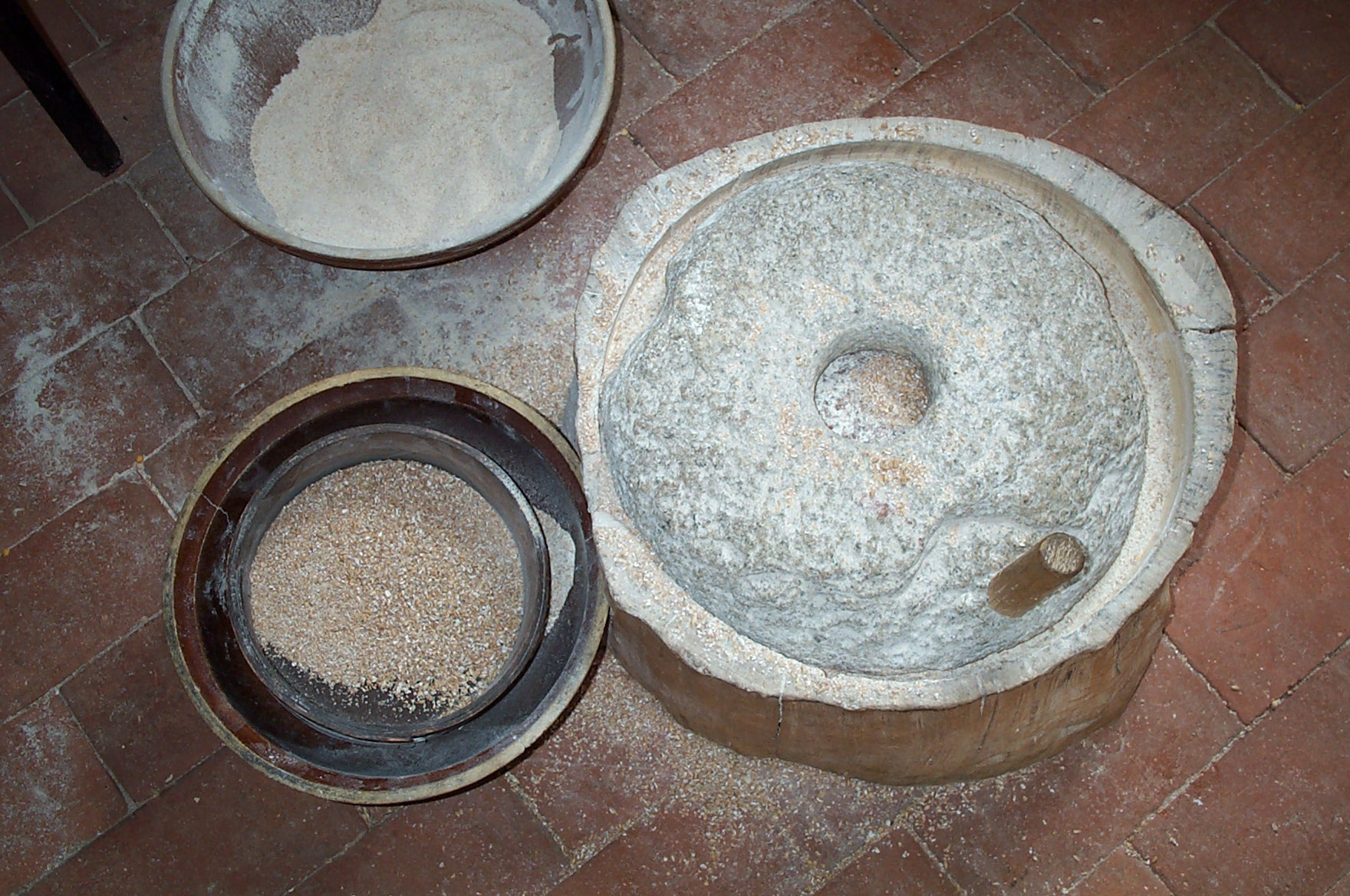

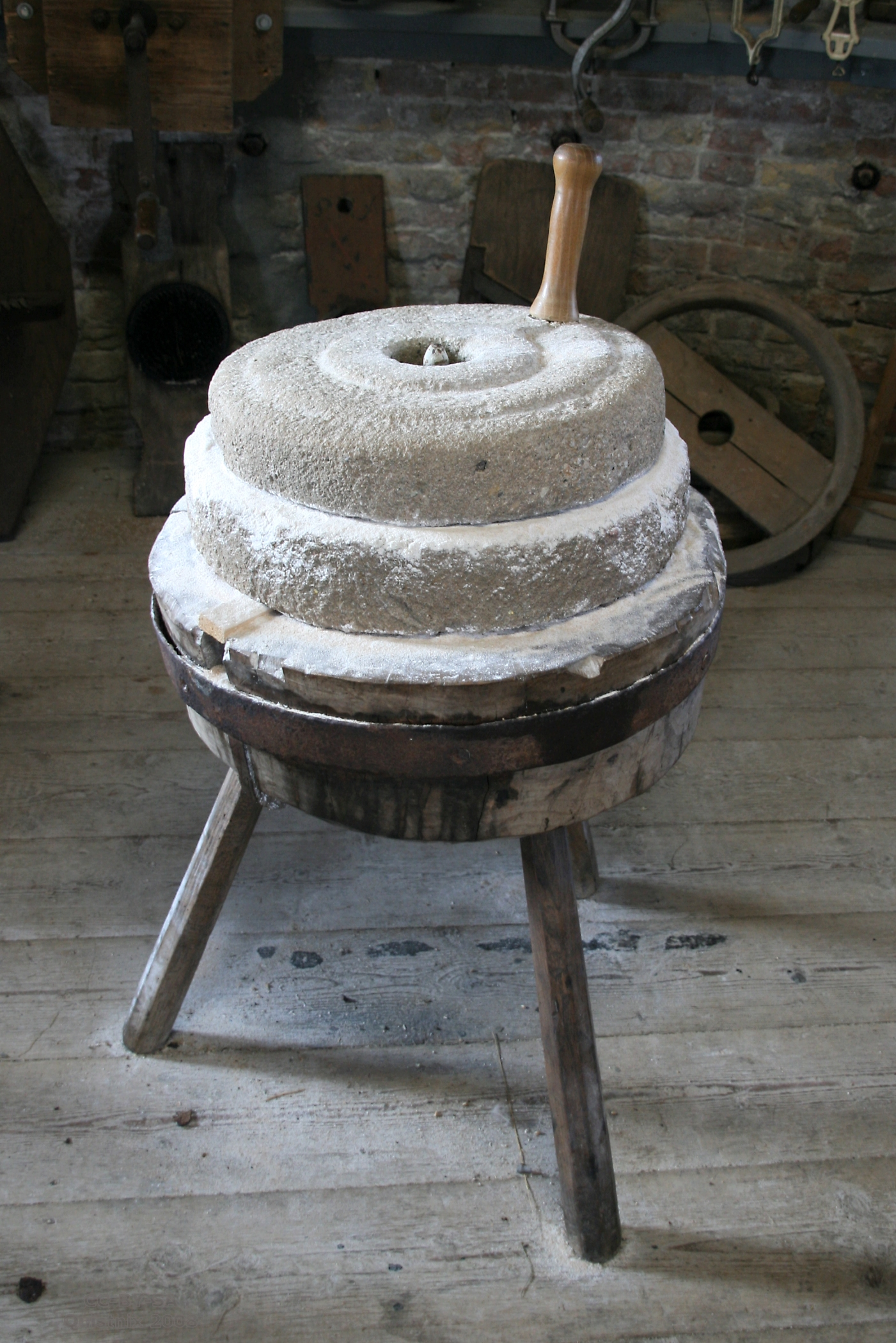
Millstone at Augusta Raurica

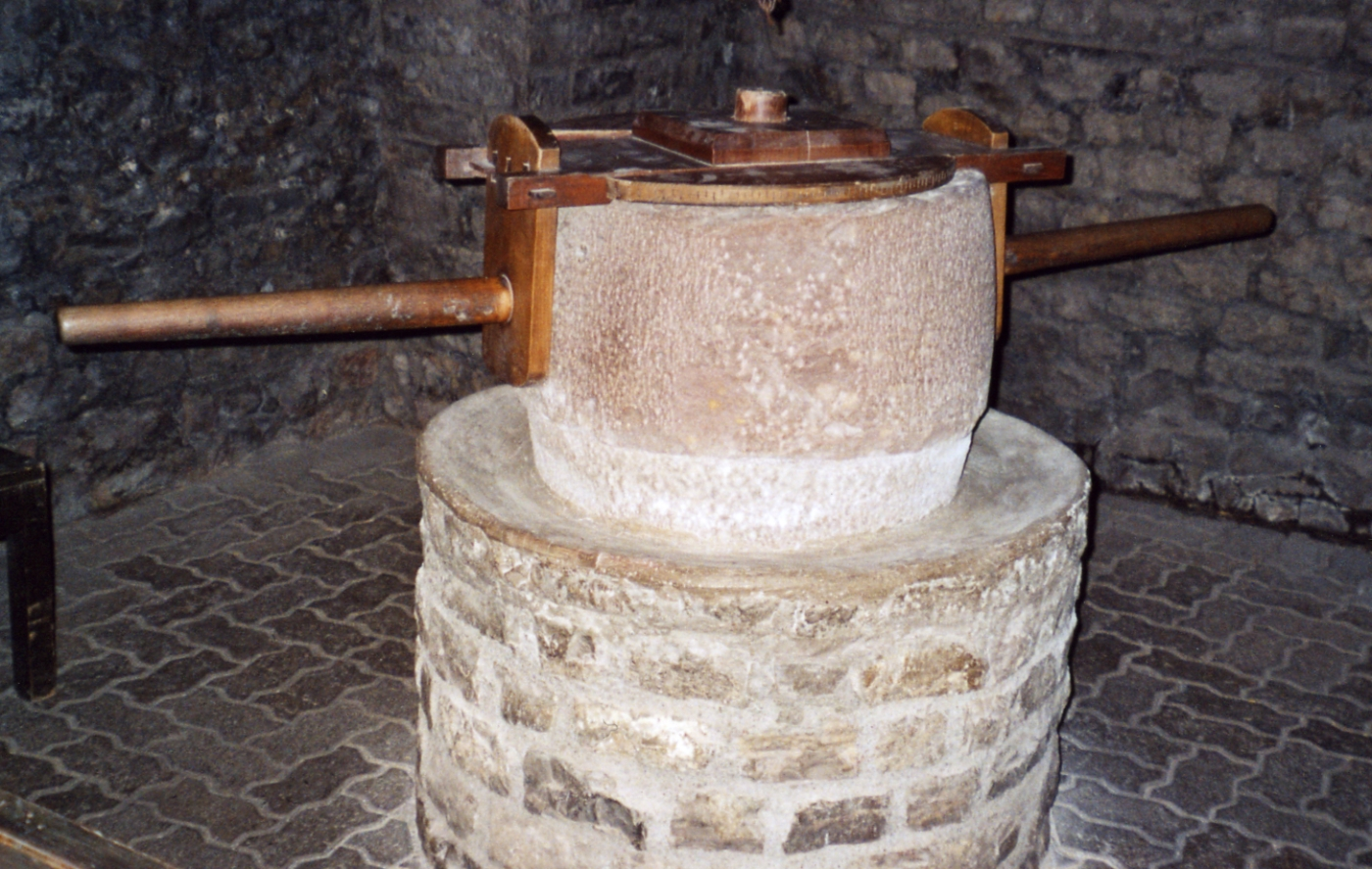

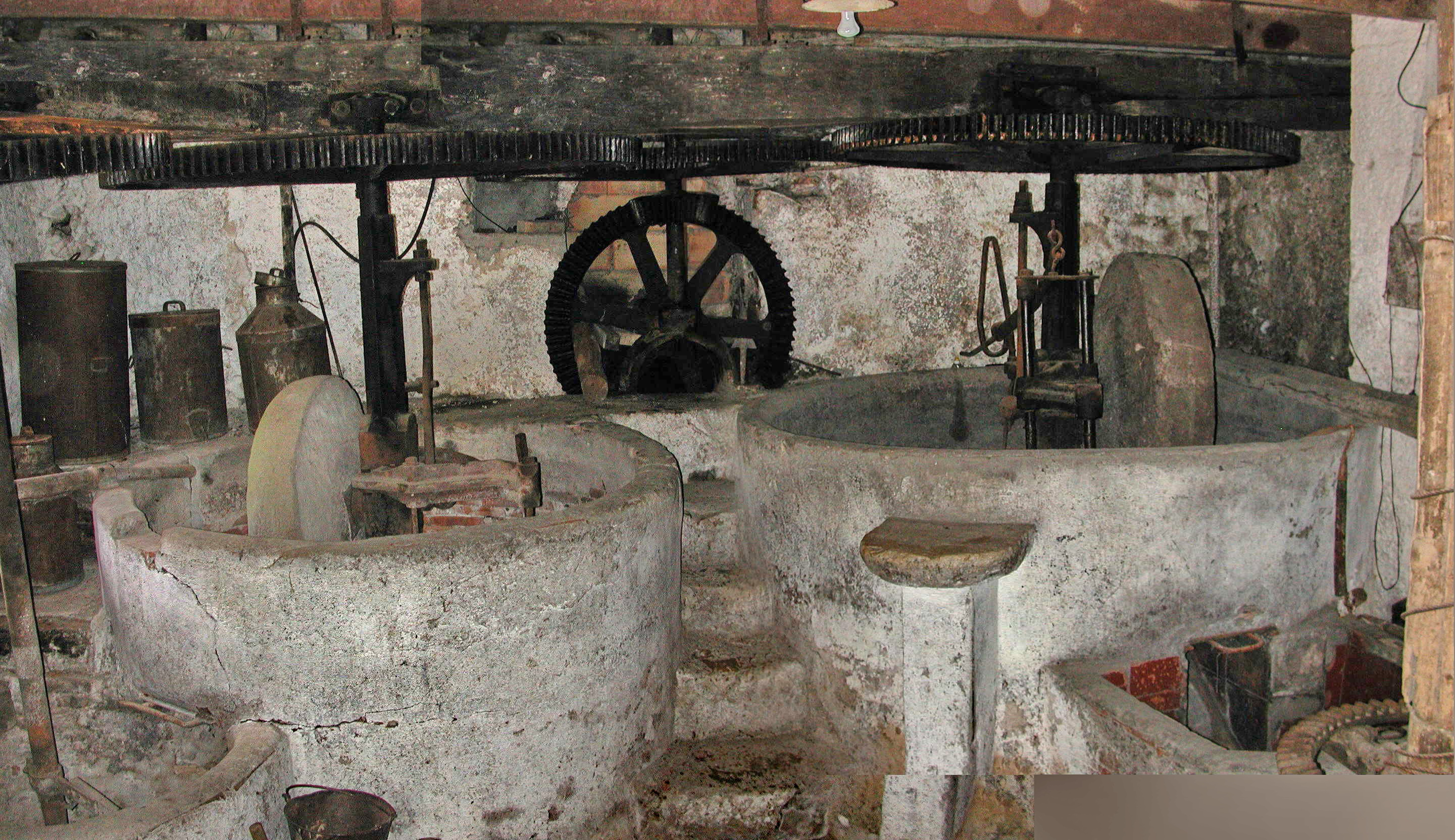
Ancient communal mills (Lambert mills) for oil, fulling, wheat, on the Siagnole, Mons (Var)

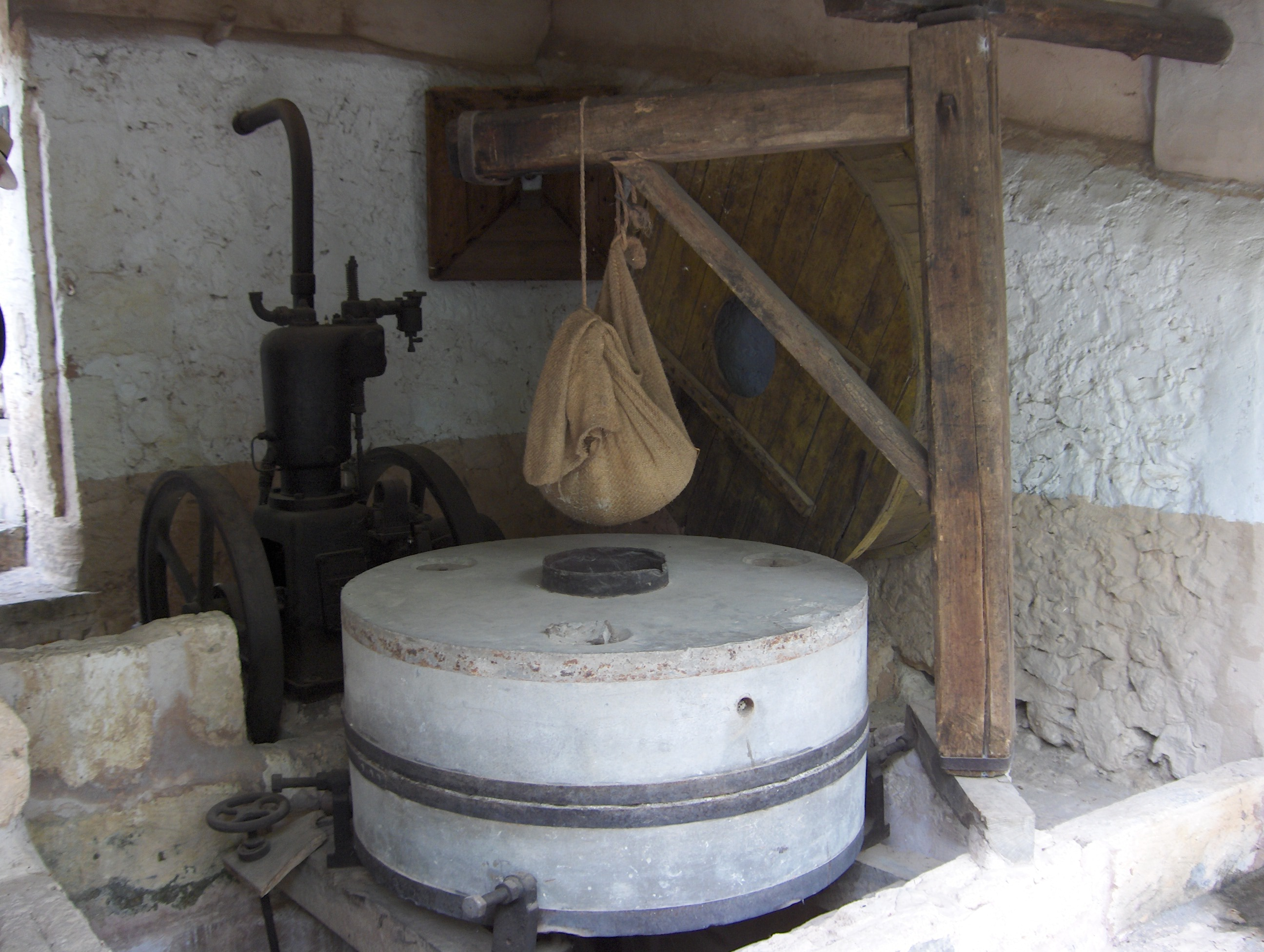
Millstone powered by internal combustion engine

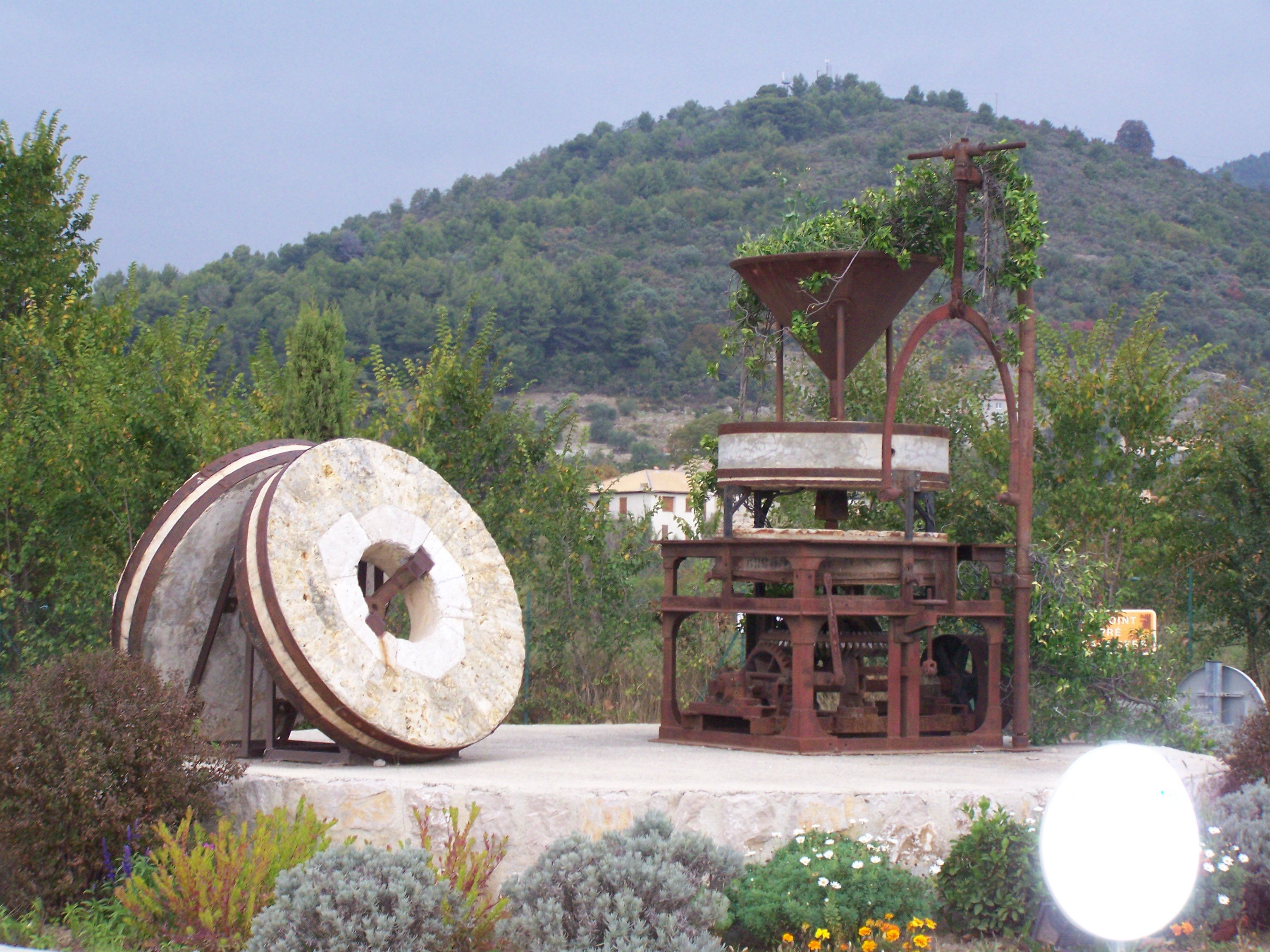
Former flour mill (Levens, France).

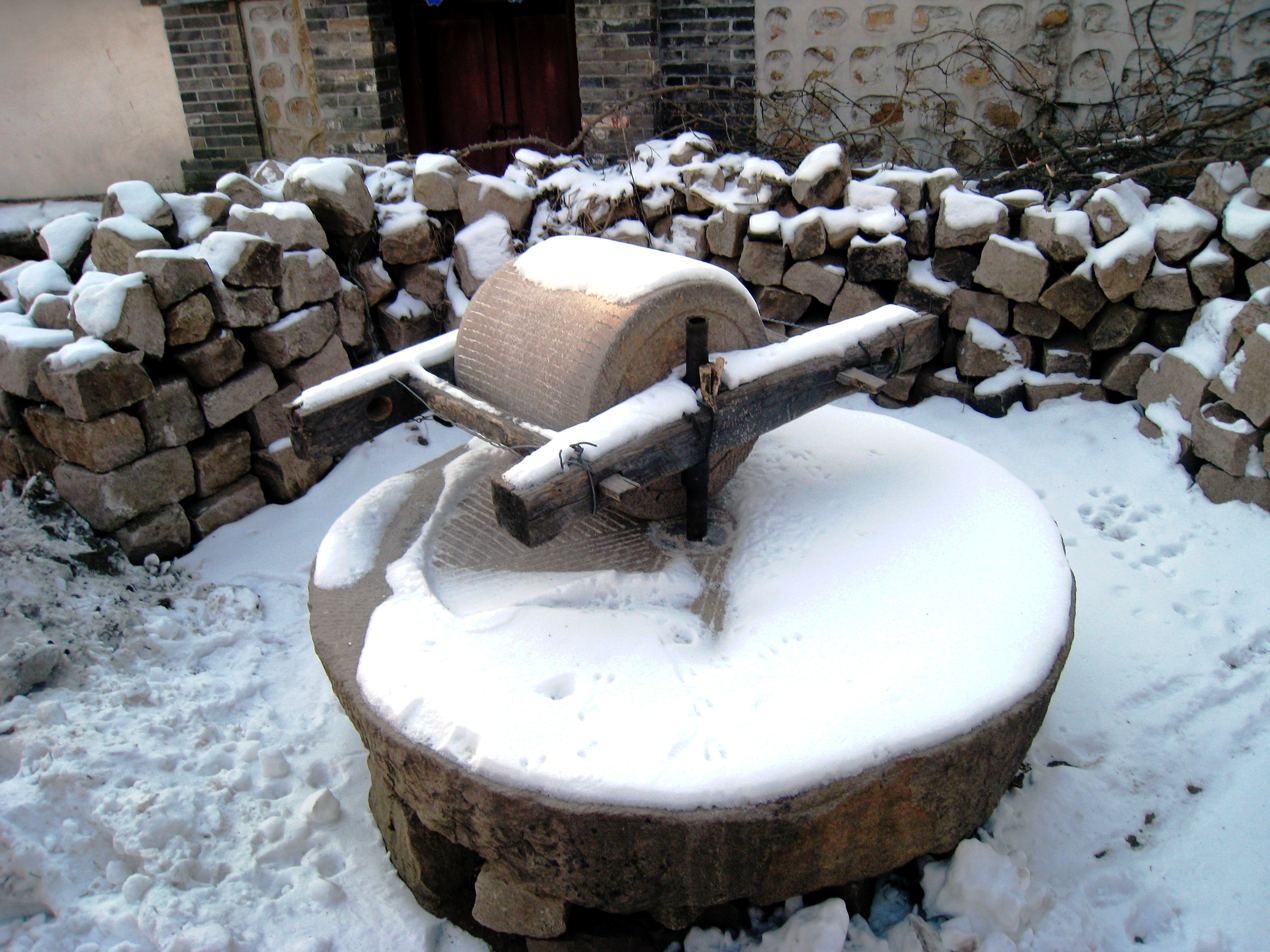
Grain millstone in the snow in northern China.

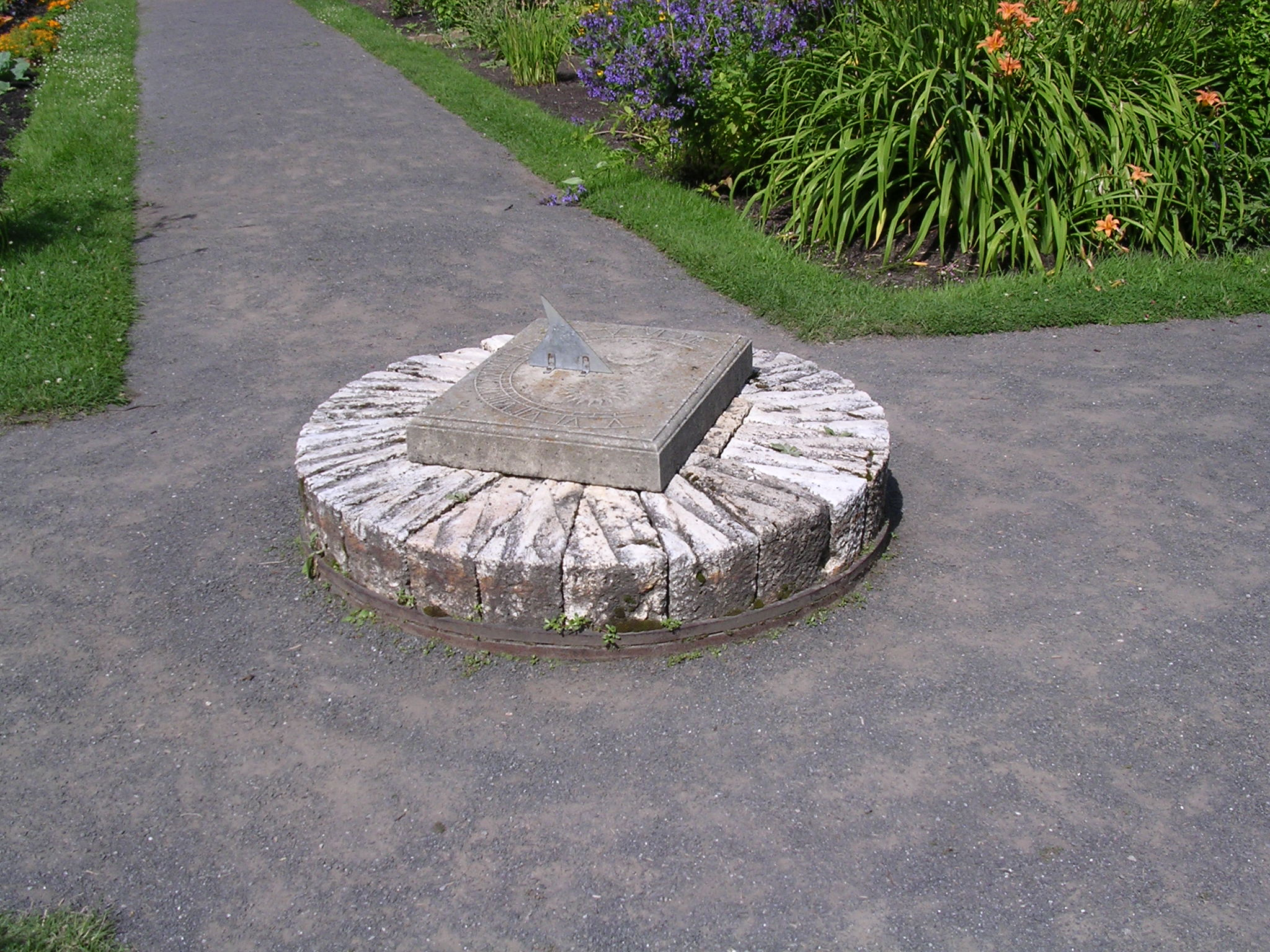
A millstone used to support a sundial at Domaine Joly in Lotbinière, Quebec.

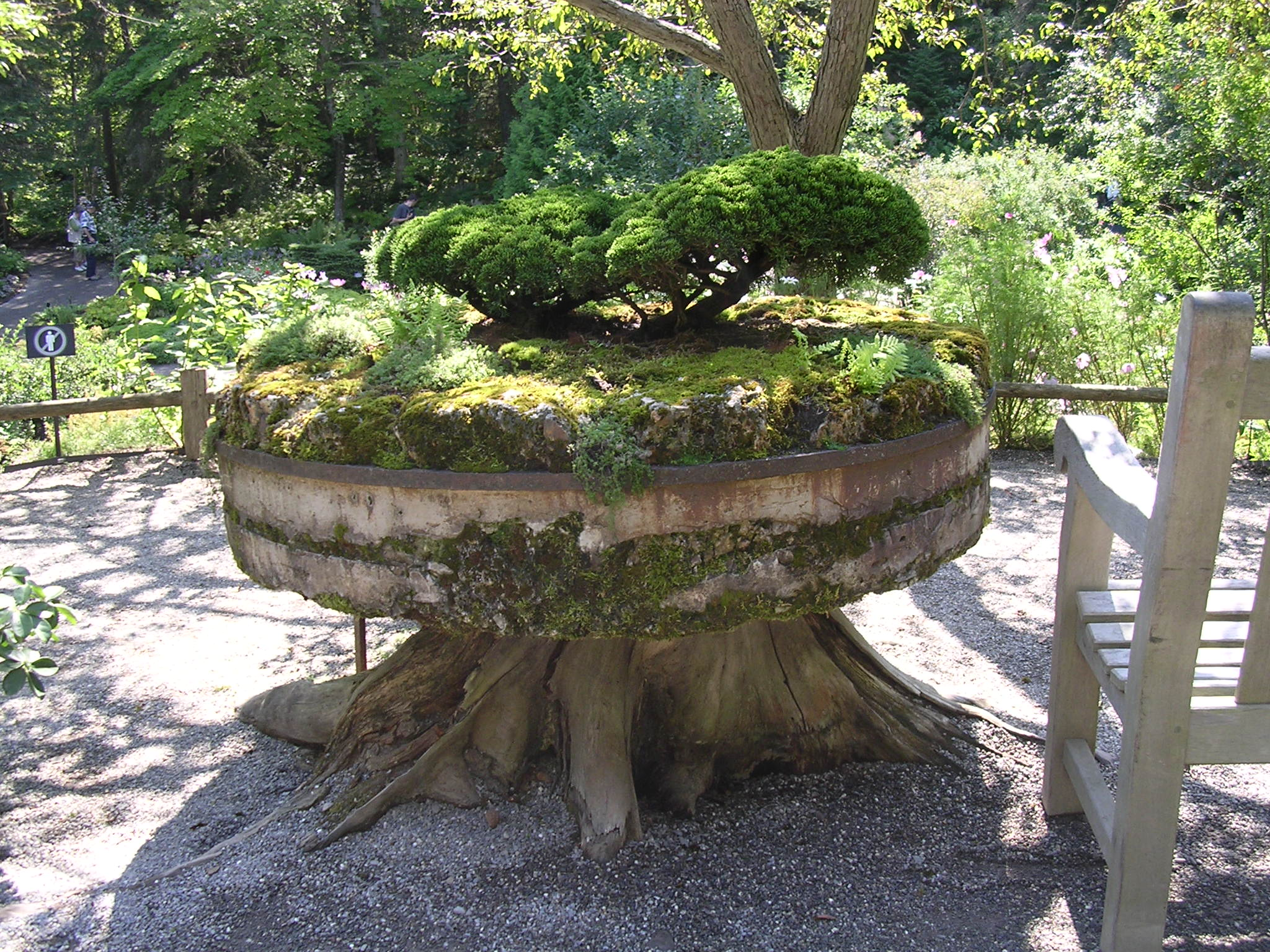
Garden Millstone at Jardins de Métis, Quebec.

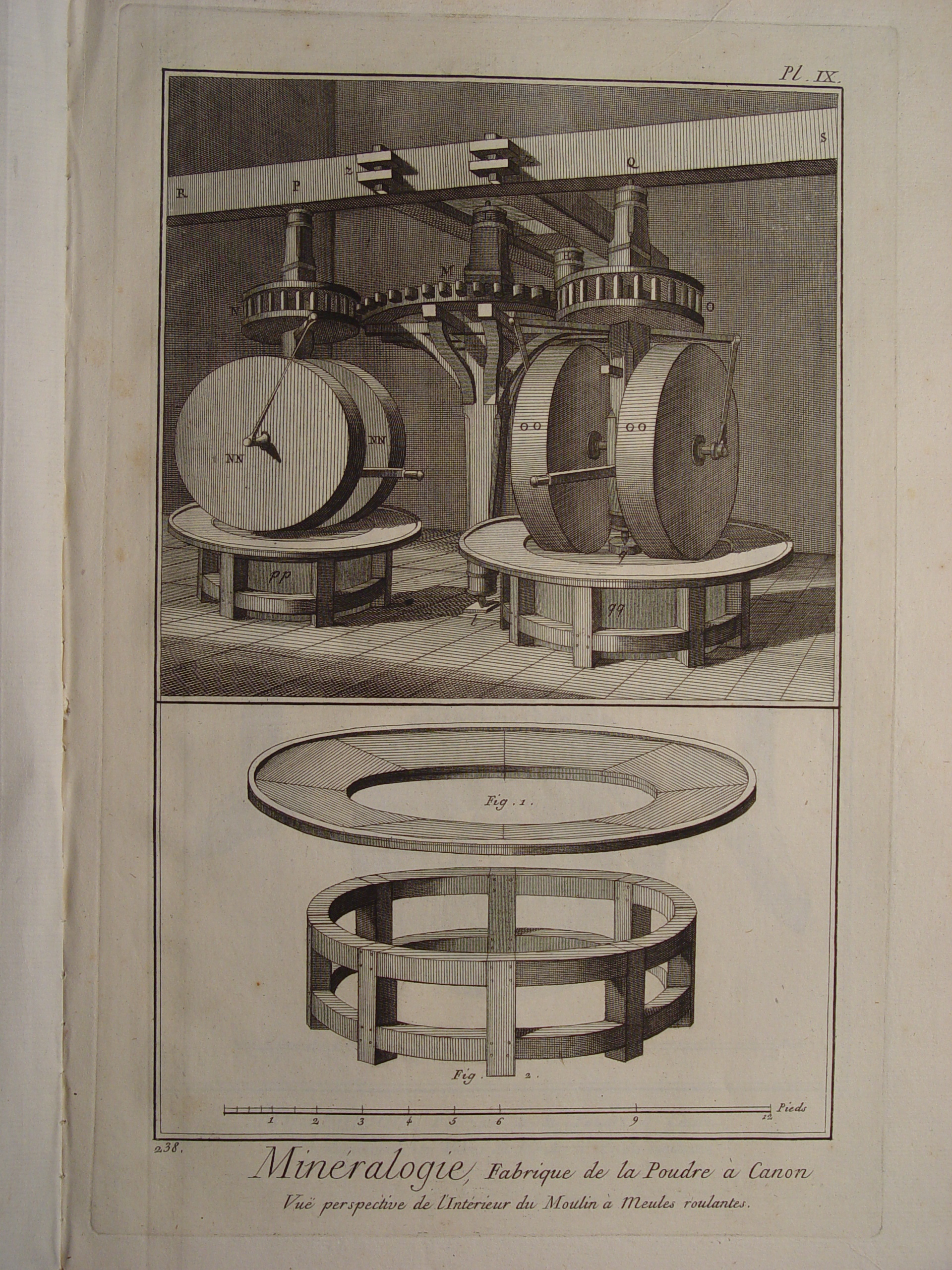
Encyclopedia. Manufacture of gunpowder

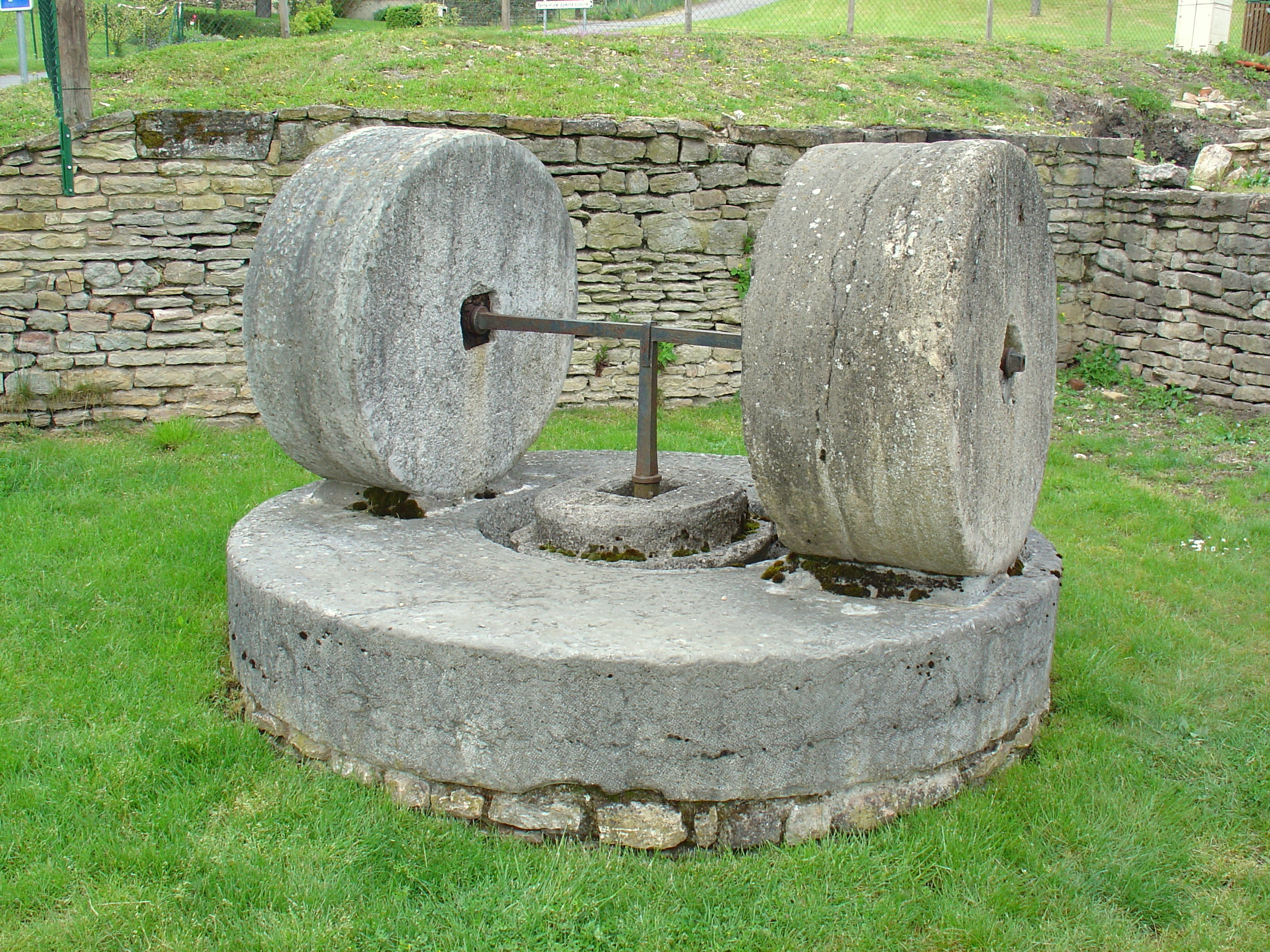
Pair of millstones used to grind gypsum before firing. Berzé-la-Ville

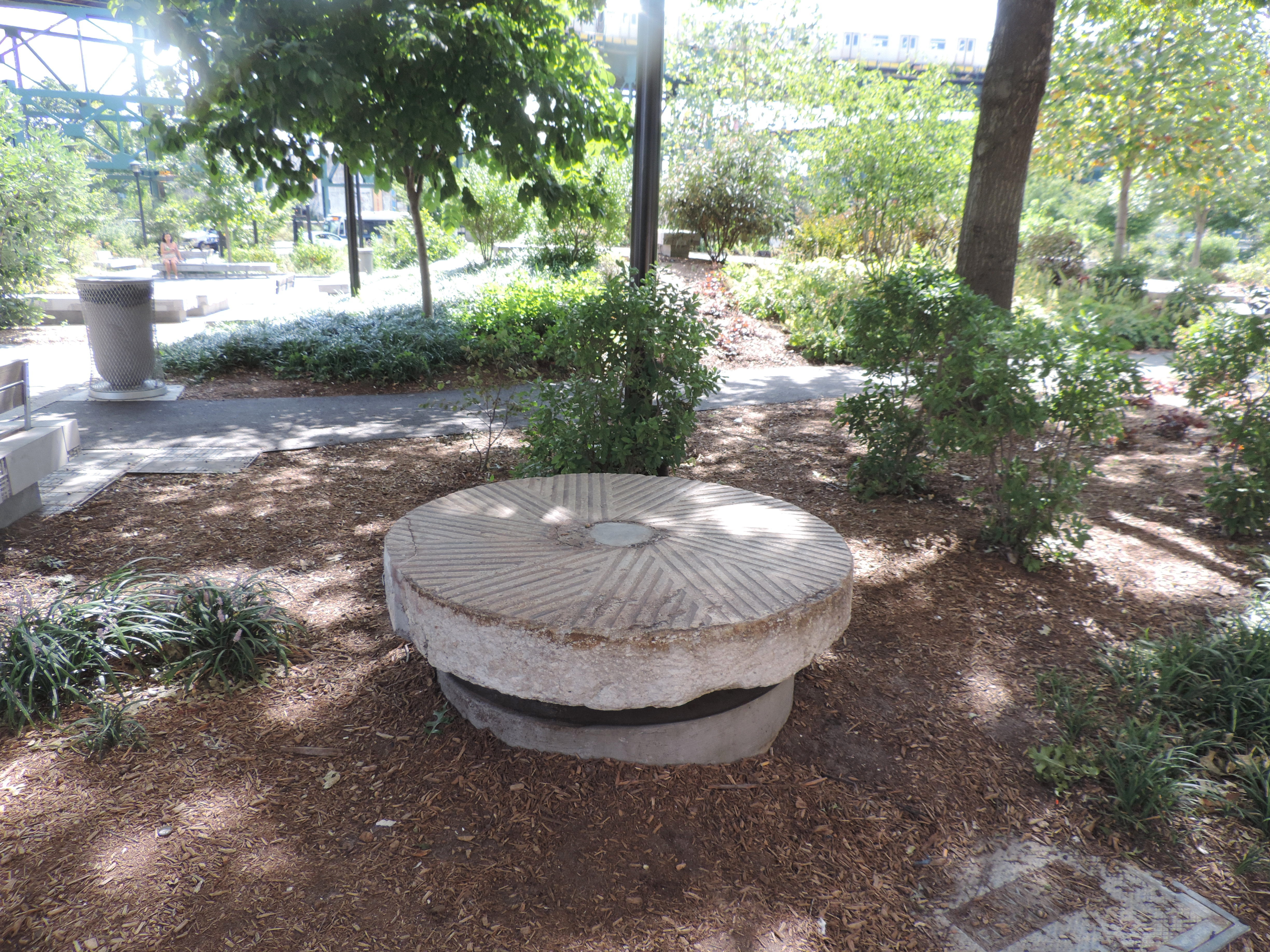
One of the Dutch Kills Millstones displayed in a NYC park.

== See also ==
- Millrind
- Bedrock mortar
- Edge mill
- Gristmill
- Quern-stone
- Mühlsteinbrüche —historic millstone quarries in Saxony
- Grain grinding wheel
- Ground stone

== Appendix ==
=== Bibliography ===
- ^{(fr)} Meules à grains. Actes du colloque international de La Ferté-sous-Jouarre, 16-19 mai 2002 archive, Éditions Ibis Press - Éditions de la maison des sciences de l'homme (ISBN 2-910728-35-8)
- ^{(fr)} Alain Belmont, La Pierre à pain. Les carrières de meules de moulins en France, du Moyen ge à la révolution industrielle, Presses universitaires de Grenoble, 2006, 2 vol. (ISBN 2-7061-1305-7)
- ^{(fr)} Bertrand Gille (s. dir.), Histoire des techniques, Gallimard, coll. "La Pléiade", 1978. (ISBN 978-2-07-010881-7)
- ^{(fr)} Bertrand Gille, Les sources statistiques de l'histoire de France - Des enquêtes du xviie siècle à 1870, Centre de recherches d'histoire et de philologie de la IVe section de l'École pratique des hautes études, 1964.
- ^{(fr)} Auguste Armengaud, Claude Rivals, Moulins à vent et meuniers des pays d'oc, Toulouse, Loubatières, 1992 (ISBN 2-86266-162-7)
- ^{(fr)} Marie-Claire Amouretti, Le pain et l'huile dans la Grèce antique. De l'araire au moulin, Besançon, Les Belles Lettres, ALUB, (328), 1986 (ISBN 2-251-60328-X)
- ^{(fr)} Jean-Pierre Brun. Archéologie du vin et de l'huile. De la préhistoire à l'époque hellénistique. Éditions errance, 2004 (ISBN 2-87772-285-6)
- ^{(fr)} Jean-Pierre Brun. Archéologie du vin et de l'huile dans l'Empire romain. Éditions errance, 2004 (ISBN 2-87772-293-7)
- Ritti, Tullia; Grewe, Klaus; Kessener, Paul (2007), "A Relief of a Water-powered Stone Saw Mill on a Sarcophagus at Hierapolis and its Implications", Journal of Roman Archaeology, vol. 20, pp. 138–163
