= Bruges Garter Book =

15th-century Anglo-Norman illuminated manuscript

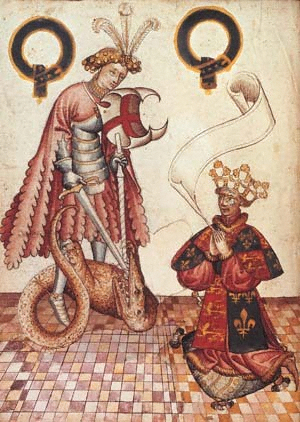
William Bruges dressed as Garter King of Arms, kneels before St George, from his Garter Book

The Bruges Garter Book is a 15th-century Anglo-Norman illuminated manuscript containing portraits of the founder knights of the Order of the Garter. It was created sometime between about 1430 to 1440, probably in London, to the order of William Bruges (c. 1375–1450), Garter King of Arms, and constitutes the first armorial covering members of the Order. It has been held since 1883 by the British Library (formerly the British Museum Library) in London under catalogue reference Stowe MS 594, indicating its former existence in the Library of the Dukes of Buckingham at Stowe House in Buckinghamshire.

== Description ==
The cover probably dates to the years following 1600, of brown leather tooled in gold-leaf with a floriated pattern, measuring 385 × 285 mm. The text is in Anglo-Norman, written in a gothic and gothic cursive hand. It contains 27 full-page miniatures in pen and watercolour, of which 26 depict standing knights displaying on a panel sitting on the ground to their right-hand sides the heraldic escutcheons appertaining to their successors in the same Garter stall in St George's Chapel, Windsor Castle. The remaining page depicts William Bruges himself in the dress of Garter King of Arms kneeling before St George, the patron of the Order.

The pages have been removed from their original positions and now exist mounted on modern paper leaves.

- Folios 1–3 consist of subsequently made notes.
- Folio 4 is a printed page imported from another book

== Provenance ==
Emblem of the Order of the Garter, a cross of St George within a Garter inscribed: Honi soit qui mal y pense. It is shown embroidered onto the left shoulder of the Garter Robes of each of the knights depicted in the Bruges Garter Book, over a tunic or tabard bearing his own armorials

The manuscript is now held by the British Library in London. From William Bruges the manuscript passed successively to the ownerships of:

- John Writhe (d. 1504), herald.
- Sir Thomas Wriothesley (d. 1534), herald.
- Elias Ashmole (1617–1692) from 1665
- John Anstis (1669–1744)
- William Bayntun (d. 1785): inscription (f. 1): bought by Meyrick for 10 guineas.
- John Meyrick (d. 1805)
- John Towneley (d. 1816), whose bookplate is affixed on the inside upper cover.
- Richard Temple-Nugent-Brydges-Chandos-Grenville, 1st Duke of Buckingham and Chandos (1776–1839), purchased from Towneley in May 1816. Kept in the library of Stowe House.
- Richard Temple-Nugent-Brydges-Chandos-Grenville, 2nd Duke of Buckingham and Chandos (1797–1861), who sold it in 1849 to Lord Ashburnham.
- Bertram Ashburnham, 4th Earl of Ashburnham (1797–1878)
- Bertram Ashburnham, 5th Earl of Ashburnham (1840–1913), who sold it in 1883 to the British Museum with another 1,084 former Stowe manuscripts.

== Illustrations ==
The illustrations depict the 25 Founder Knights and King Edward III the sovereign of the Order of the Garter as follows, shown in ascending order of Garter-Stall number in St. George's Chapel:

Portrait	Name	Arms
	King Edward III (1327–1377) (Anachronistic: fleurs de lys in Royal Arms of England not reduced to three until reign of King Henry IV (1399–1413)	
	Edward, the Black Prince, Prince of Wales (1330–1376)	
	Henry of Grosmont, 4th Earl of Lancaster (c. 1310–1361)	
	Thomas de Beauchamp, 11th Earl of Warwick (d.1369)	
	Jean III de Grailly, Captal de Buch (d.1377)	
	Ralph de Stafford, 2nd Baron Stafford (1301–1372)	
	William de Montacute, 2nd Earl of Salisbury (1328–1397)	
	Roger Mortimer, 2nd Earl of March (1328–1360)	
	John de Lisle, 2nd Baron Lisle (1318–1356)	
	Bartholomew de Burghersh (died 1369)	
	John de Beauchamp (died 1360)	
	John de Mohun, 2nd Baron Mohun (c. 1320–1376)	
	Hugh de Courtenay (died 1349)	
	Thomas Holland (died 1360)	
	John de Grey (c. 1300–1359)	
	Richard Fitz-Simon (b.1295)	
	Miles Stapleton (died 1364)	
	Thomas Wale (died 1352)	
	Hugh Wrottesley (died 1381)	
	Nele Loring (died 1386)	
	John Chandos (died 1369) (Note: Arms of John Chandos are generally given as Argent, a pile gules, not as shown in the Bruges Garter Book as Or, a pile gules)	
	James Audley (died 1369)	
	Otho Holand (died 1359)	
	Henry Eam (died before 1360)	
	Sanchet D'Abrichecourt (died 1345)	
	Walter Paveley (died 1375)	

== Sources ==
- Catalogue of Illuminated Manuscripts, British Library
