= Peter Mallore =

English landowner and judge in Ireland

Sir Peter Mallore (or Mallory; died c. 1380) was a prominent landowner and local politician in fourteenth-century Northamptonshire, who also served as a judge in Ireland. His career was marked by controversy: he was imprisoned on at least two occasions, the second time for assaulting another judge. The troubles of his later years were due largely to the actions of his son Giles, who was accused of wasting the inheritance of his infant stepson and ward. Fortunately for his career, Sir Peter enjoyed the personal regard of a number of influential men, notably the Black Prince and King David II of Scotland.

== Family ==
The Mallores were a long-established local family. The earlier Peter Mallore (died 1309), who was a justice of the Court of Common Pleas and one of the five judges who sat on the commission of gaol delivery which tried William Wallace for treason in 1305, was this Peter's cousin.

The younger Peter's father married Margaret Wale of Weedon Pinkeney, Northamptonshire, daughter of Sir Thomas Wale the elder, and eldest sister and heiress of Sir Thomas Wale junior, one of the original knights of the Order of the Garter. On Wale's death in 1352 Peter, as the next male heir, inherited substantial estates, including Litchborough and Weedon Pinkeney.

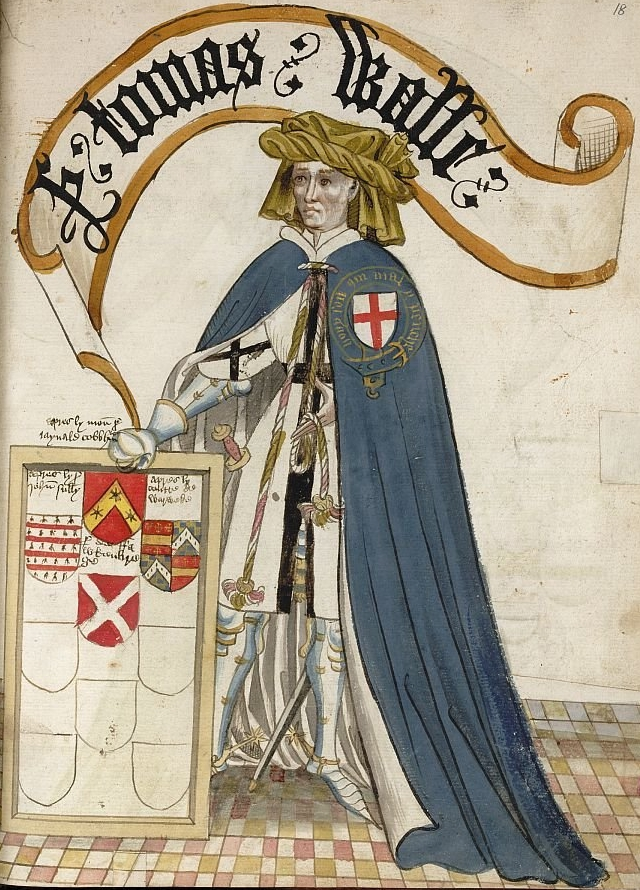
Sir Thomas Wale (died 1352), founder knight of the Garter: he was Peter's uncle, from whom he inherited large estates in Northamptonshire

== Politician ==
He played a very active role in local politics: he served on several commissions of oyer and terminer in his native county, and sat as MP for Northamptonshire in the House of Commons in the Parliament of 1351–2. He served as High Sheriff of Northamptonshire in the same year, and was knighted. He did not pay the arrears due on the Sheriff's accounts, and for this failure to pay a Crown debt he was imprisoned in the Fleet Prison. He was quickly pardoned, having already been pardoned for an unspecified offence in 1346 on the intercession of the King's eldest son Edward the Black Prince.

== In Ireland ==
In 1357 he went to Ireland with the Justiciar of Ireland, Almaric de St. Amaud. He was appointed a justice of the Court of King's Bench (Ireland). In 1358 the Crown granted him £20 from the Exchequer of Ireland on foot of his own petition to the King. In the same year he was granted custody of the lands formerly held by Sir Eustace le Poer in County Kilkenny, which had been forfeited for le Poer's role in the rebellion of Maurice FitzGerald, 1st Earl of Desmond in 1345/6. The Crown also granted him a castle called Ballytyn, (which cannot now be identified with certainty) which was described as being in a prostrate (ruinous) condition, on condition that he repair it. Malorre, however, proved unwilling to perform this task, and surrendered the castle on payment of £20.

== Conflict ==
Sometime after his return to England, he became embroiled in a serious conflict with Sir Henry Green, the Lord Chief Justice of England, a close neighbour in the country, who accused Peter and his son Giles of assaulting him. They were tried, found guilty and imprisoned in the Tower of London. The Mallores aggravated their offence by refusing to pay Green £300 in damages, which might have secured their early release. They were pardoned in 1364 on the intercession of the captive King David II of Scotland, who had also been in the Tower for some years and had become a friend of Peter there.

== Later years- the Baskerville dispute ==
For more than a decade after his release from the Tower Peter lived quietly on his estates, but he was drawn into fresh controversy after 1374, when his son Sir Giles Mallore married Joan Baskerville (née de Eveningham), widow of Sir Richard Baskerville of Eardisley, Herefordshire, without a royal licence (which was required for marriage to a widow). They were pardoned for contracting the marriage, and Joan was confirmed in her right of dower in the Baskerville lands (usually a right to one-third of the property). Soon afterwards they were accused of "wasting and despoiling" the Baskerville inheritance, despite the fact that they were the legal guardians of the Baskerville heir, Joan's son (or stepson) Richard, who was still an infant, having been about four years old when his father died, which was a few months before Joan remarried Giles. Peter was required to stand surety for his son and daughter-in-law's good behaviour, while a lengthy inquiry by the Crown into their alleged misconduct dragged on into the 1380s.

Despite his record of controversy, Giles sat in the House of Commons for his father's old constituency of Northamptonshire in six Parliaments summoned between 1383 and 1402, and was knighted. Peter probably died in 1380 or 1381: his estates passed to Giles, who died in 1403. Giles' stepson Richard Baskerville attained his majority, but is thought to have died well before Giles in about 1394. Giles outlived Joan and remarried: his second wife was named Marina.

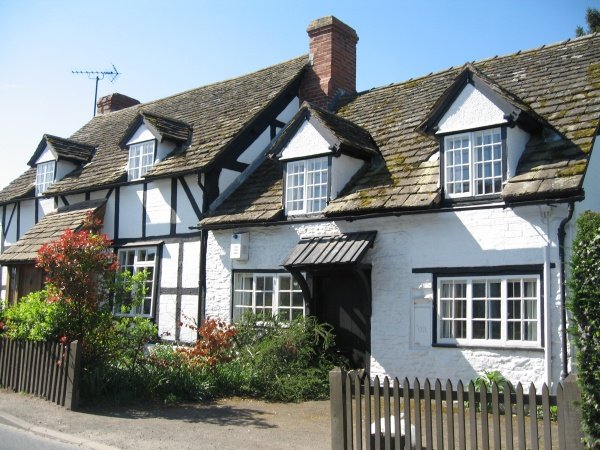
Eardisley, Herefordshire: Peter was drawn into controversy after his son, who married into the Baskerville family, was accused of despoiling the estate

== Sources ==
- Ball, F. Elrington The Judges in Ireland 1221-1921 London John Murray 1926
- Beltz, George-Frederick Memorials of the Order of the Garter from its Foundation to the Present Time London William Pickering 1841
- Calendars of the Close Rolls and Patent Rolls 1374-1396
- Prestwich, Michael Edward I University of California Press 1988
- Roskell, J.S., Clark, Linda, Rawcliffe, Carole editors: The History of Parliament: the House of Commons 1386-1421 Boydell and Brewer 1993
- Smyth, Joseph Constantine Chronicle of the Law Officers of Ireland London Butterworths 1839
