= Eustace d'Aubrichecourt =

French knight

Eustace d'Aubrichecourt or d'Abrichecourt or d'Auberchicourt, of the Auberchicourt family, (c. 1334 in Bugnicourt - c. 1373 in Normandy) was a knight from Hainaut who enlisted in the service of the English during the Hundred Years' War. His knightly exploits were recorded by Froissart.

== Family ==
He was the younger brother of Sanchet D'Abrichecourt (1330 in Bugnicourt-1349), one of the founding members of the Order of the Garter in 1348, the most senior knighthood order in England. Sanchet was its 25th member.

== Service in the Hundred Years War ==
He was under the command of Edward the Black Prince, the eldest son of king Edward III of England, during the Black Prince's chevauchée of 1355. He took part in the Battle of Poitiers in 1356, where he was for some time taken prisoner. He then commanded the Anglo-Gascon troops at the siege of Carcassonne.

Between 1356 and 1359, with the Hundred Years War then experiencing a quieter period, Eustache d'Auberchicourt was found in Champagne, where he waged war both for his own account and in the interest of the English, holding ten to twelve fortresses or cities (Nogent-sur-Seine, Arcis-sur-Aube, etc.) with his "headquarters" in Pont-sur-Seine. During this quiet period Eustace also fought in the service of Charles II of Navarre. He enriched himself by conquering villages and cities, as well as by ransoming prisoners, and thus acquired glory and profit. On 23 June 1359, Eustace commanded the Anglo-Navarrese army which was defeated by the bishop of Troyes Henri de Poitiers near Nogent-sur-Seine. In this battle a French infantry attack overcame his archers leaving the field open for the French knights to win the day on horseback.

After 1359 Eustace d'Auberchicourt again became a captain of routiers. He settled in the county of Rethel in Attigny, and from there roamed and plundered Champagne going to the vicinity of Laon (Épernay, Vertus, Château-Thierry, La Ferté-Milon, etc.). The Treaty of Brétigny in May 1360 put an end to these expeditions, the English and their allies had to leave Champagne. Eustace succeeded in selling several of his possessions to the Louis de Male, Count of Rethel and to Robert I, Count of Bar.

He left for Normandy to hold the garrison in Carentan on behalf of Charles the Bad of Navarre. He was one of the signatories in October 1360 in Calais of the confirmation of the Treaty of Brétigny.

In 1362 he was appointed governor of Mons. In 1364 he took part in the battle of Auray where Charles de Blois was killed, then he was appointed captain of Bouchain. In 1366 he accompanied the English knights who went to support king Peter of Castile in Spain. After the Treaty of Brétigny was broken in 1369, he took part in the fighting again. In 1369 he raided Agenais and passed through Anjou. In 1370 he was in Limousin, where he took part in the siege and sack of Limoges. Then he besieged the château de Rochechouart. The same year, he was taken prisoner by the French, who demanded a ransom of 12,000 francs. Once this ransom has been paid, Eustace entered the service of King Charles II of Navarre.

He died around 1373 in Normandy after a life of battles and raiding.

== Marriage ==
Eustace married Isabelle de Juliers (d. in 1411) on Michaelmas 1360 in Wingham, Kent. She was daughter of William V, Duke of Jülich, niece to Queen of England Philippa of Hainaut and widow of John, 3rd Earl of Kent. Eustace and Isabelle had a son, William.
