= Sanchet D'Abrichecourt =

French knight

Sir Sanchet D'Abrichecourt KG
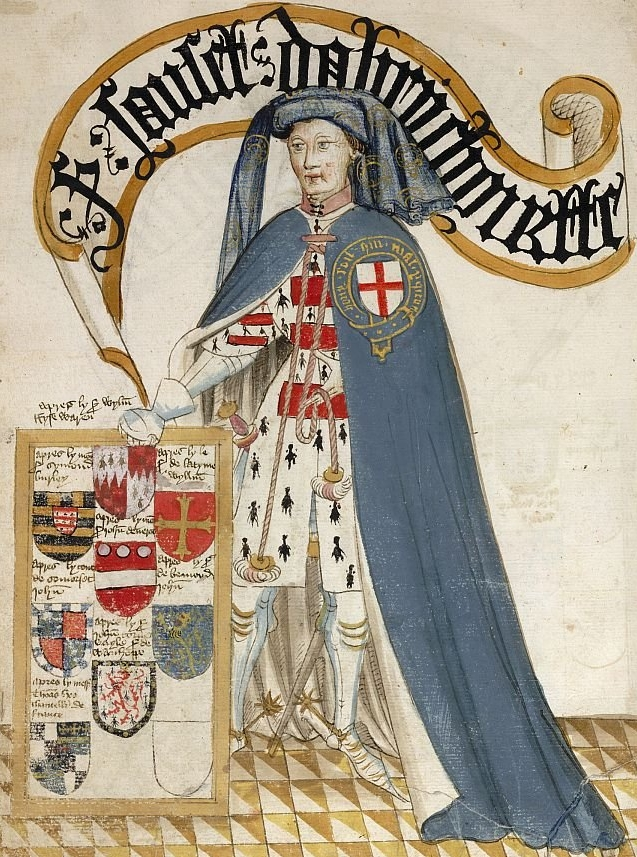
- Sir Sanchet D'Abrichecourt, KG, illustration from the Bruges Garter Book, c.1430
- Born: c.1330 Bugnicourt
- Died: c.1359 (aged 28–29)
- Other names: D'Abridgecourt, Dabridgcourt, Dabrichecourt or Aubréciourt
- Occupation: knight
- Known for: founder Knight of the Garter
- Children: 2 sons
- Father: Sir Nicholas D'Abrichecourt
- Relatives: Eustace d'Aubrichecourt (younger brother)

Sir Sanchet D'Abrichecourt (c. 1330 – c. 1359) was a French knight and a founder Knight of the Garter. His surname was alternatively spelt D'Abridgecourt, Dabridgcourt, Dabrichecourt or Aubréciourt and derived from the Hainault town of Auberchicourt.

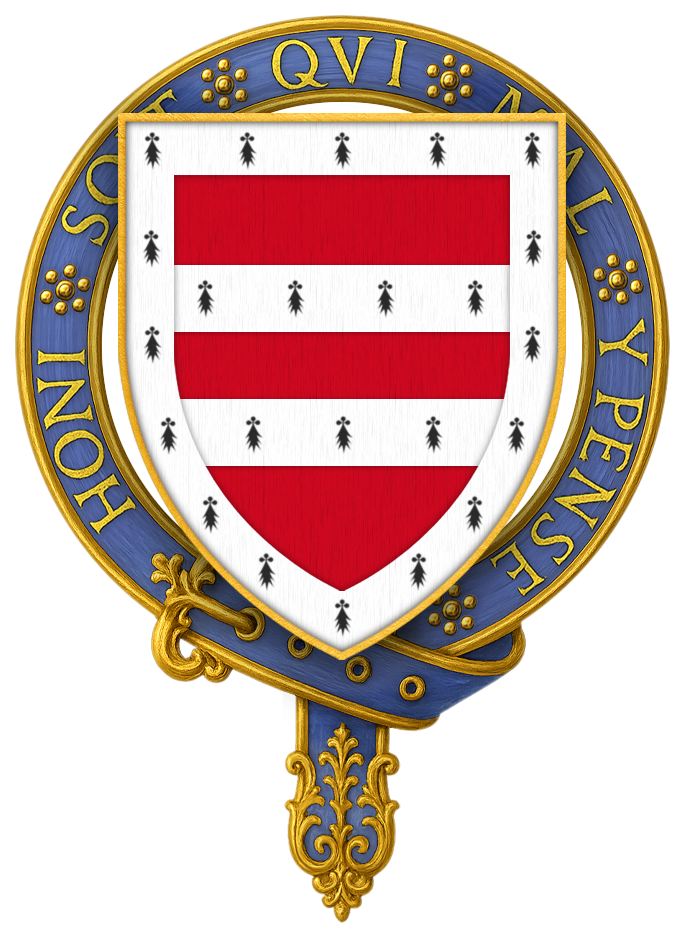
Arms of Sir Sanchet d'Abrichecourt, KG

He was born in Bugnicourt, the son of Sir Nicholas D'Abrichecourt, a nobleman from Hainault who had come to England in 1326 as an escort of Queen Isabella. The queen was returning from France with her son Edward with the ultimately successful objective of deposing her husband, Edward II, and setting the younger Edward on the English throne in his father's place. Sanchet had a younger brother, Eustace.

In 1348 he was selected by Edward III as a founder Knight of the Garter and allocated stall number 25 in St George's Chapel at Windsor, the spiritual home of the new order of chivalry. He died within a few years, however, and his place in the order was taken in 1359 by Sir William FitzWaryne.

He left two sons, Sir John Dabrichecourt, MP for Derbyshire and Constable of the Tower (1413-1415) and Sir Nicholas Dabrichecourt, Esquire of the Body to Edward III, MP for Hampshire and Constable of Nottingham Castle. The castle had been the scene of Edward III's coup in 1330 against his mother, Isabella, and Roger Mortimer, 1st Earl of March. Nicholas married heiress Elizabeth Say of Stratfield Saye, Hampshire.
