= Henry Green (English judge) =

English lawyer and judge

Sir Henry Green (de Grene), of Boughton, (died 6 August 1369) was an English lawyer, and Chief Justice of the King's Bench from 24 May 1361 to 29 October 1365. He was speaker of the House of Lords in two Parliaments (1363–64).

He was born 1310 the son of an extremely wealthy wool merchant Henry del Grene of Isham, Northamptonshire and an unknown mother. Early in his career, he served both Queen consort, Isabel, and her grandson, Edward the Black Prince. He was made a justice of the Court of Common Pleas in 1354, and knighted by King Edward III. In 1357, he was excommunicated for non-appearance at the trial of Thomas de Lisle, bishop of Ely, in Avignon.

About the same time he had a violent quarrel with the prominent Mallore family of Litchborough, who were neighbours of his in Northamptonshire. Green accused Sir Peter Mallore, a former MP and High Sheriff of Northamptonshire, and his son Sir Giles of assaulting him. Both men were found guilty and imprisoned in the Tower of London, but were eventually pardoned on the intercession of King David II of Scotland.

In 1365, while Chief Justice, he was arrested along with Sir William de Skipwith, the Chief Baron of the exchequer, and stripped of his office. The charge was probably corruption; both Green and Skipwith were fined for their offences. There is no evidence of permanent disgrace and although he was never again employed as a judge, he kept his considerable estates. Green was married twice, first to a woman named Amabel, with whom he had three children: Agnes (b. 1341), Amabel (b. 1343), and Thomas (b. 1345). His first wife died, probably due to the bubonic plague in 1349 and he married a second time in 1350 to Katherine Drayton, daughter of Sir Simon Drayton, who arranged the marriage to elevate the status of Henry Green so that he could be knighted. A second son, Henry, was born in 1352, who inherited Drayton House, in Lowick, Northamptonshire, passed to him through his grandfather Sir Simon, his uncle, Sir John, and his cousin Sir Baldwin.

== Death ==
He died in 1369, and was buried in the church in Boughton in Northamptonshire.

At his death, his possessions descended to his two sons, Thomas and Henry. Henry the younger was executed in 1399 at Bristol Castle by the Duke of Hereford (the future Henry IV) for his role as a councillor of Richard II.

During his life, he is credited with having bought the village of Greens Norton, in Northamptonshire for a price of 20 shillings. There is a memorial in the parish church to Greene and his wife, even though they are buried at Boughton.

== Sources ==
Legal offices
Preceded by William de Shareshull	Lord Chief Justice; 1361–1365	Succeeded by John Knyvet
