= Richard Fitz-Simon =

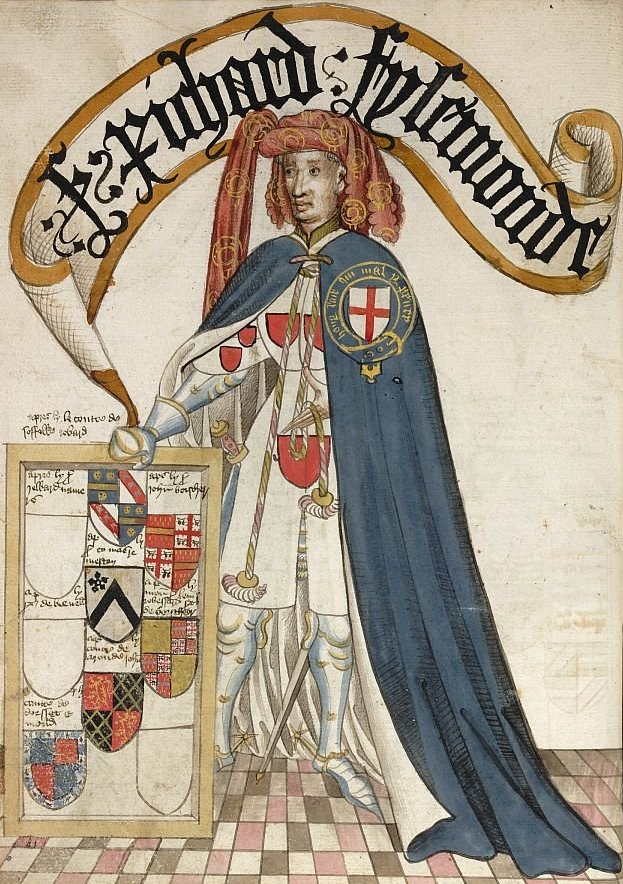
Sir Richard FitzSimon, KG, depicted in the Bruges Garter Book, c.1430

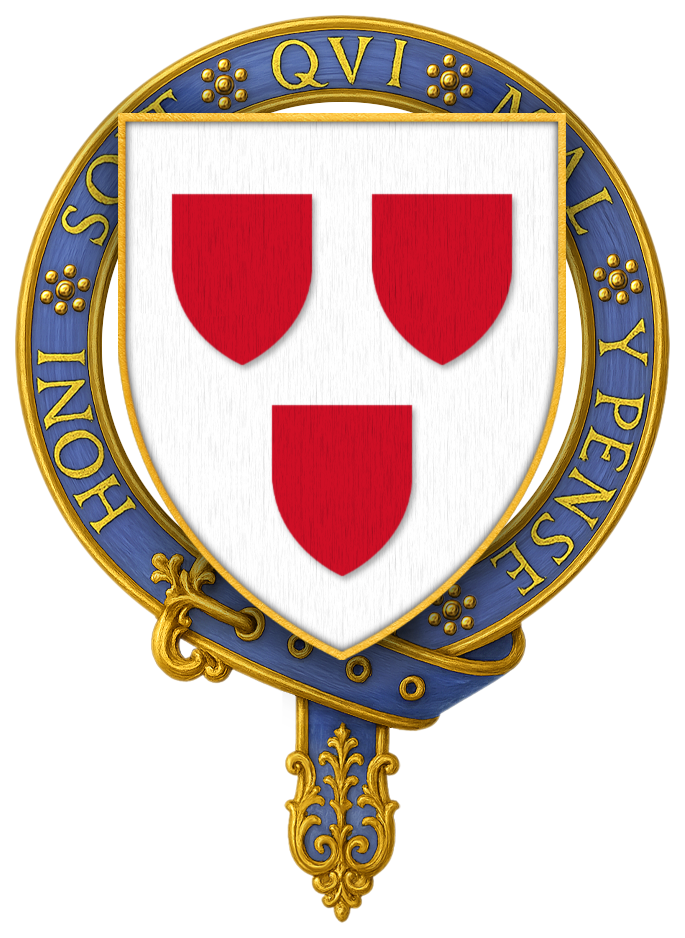
Garter-encircled arms of Sir Richard Fitz-Simon, KG, Argent, three inescutcheons gules

Sir Richard Fitz-Simon KG, of Pensthorpe, Bawsey, and Glosthorpe (in Bawsey), Norfolk, Letheringham, Suffolk, etc. was a founder member and 15th Knight of the Order of the Garter in 1348.

== Career ==
Richard Fitz-Simon is recorded as having taken part in a tournament at Dunstable in 1334. He later served in Flanders. In 1344, he was part of a diplomatic mission to Castile and in 1345-6 he served with Henry of Grosmont in Aquitaine. In 1346, he served as the standard bearer of Edward, the Black Prince at the Battle of Crecy, where he saved the prince's life at the peak of the fighting. In 1348, he was appointed to the Order of the Garter.

== Marriage ==
He married before Hilary term 1345 (date of lawsuit) Ada Botetourt, widow of Sir John de Saint Philibert. They had no issue. Richard's wife Ada Botetourt was the daughter of Sir John Botetourt, 1st Lord Botetourt, by his wife, Maud, daughter of Sir Thomas Fitz Otes and great-granddaughter of William Longespée, 3rd Earl of Salisbury the son of Henry II of England

== Death ==
Sir Richard Fitz Simon died in 1348 or 1349, but the actual date is unknown.
