= Robert Lisle, 1st Baron Lisle of Rougemont =

English peer

Robert de Lisle, 1st Baron Lisle
- Arms of Robert de Lisle, 1st Baron Lisle. Or, a fess between two chevrons sable.
- Born: 20 January 1288; Campton, Bedfordshire
- Died: 4 January 1344 (aged 55)
- Buried: Greyfriars, London
- Spouse: Margaret de Beauchamp
- Issue: John de Lisle, 2nd Baron Lisle; Robert de Lisle; Thomas de Lisle; Alice de Lisle; Elizabeth de Lisle; Aubrey de Lisle
- Father: Warin de Lisle
- Mother: Alice de Montfort

Robert de Lisle, 1st Baron Lisle (20 January 1288 – 4 January 1344) was an English peer. He saw military service in Scotland, and fought at the Battle of Boroughbridge. After his wife's death, he joined the Franciscan order. He was the owner of the Lisle Psalter.

== Life ==
Robert de Lisle, born 20 January 1288 at Campton, Bedfordshire, was the son of Sir Warin de Lisle (d. before 7 December 1296) and Alice de Montfort, daughter of Sir Peter de Montfort (d.1287) of Beaudesert Castle, Warwickshire, by Maud de la Mare, daughter of Sir Henry de la Mare.

He was a minor at his father's death in 1296. Having proved his age on 21 March 1310, he had livery of his father's lands five days later. On 18 July 1310, the King (Edward II) granted him livery of other manors, including the manor of Harewood in Yorkshire which his father had claimed after the death of Isabel de Forz.

He was summoned for military service, to a council, and to Parliament by writs directed Roberto de Insula or Roberto del Isle, [Both names meaning "of the island"], 'whereby he is held to have become Lord Lisle'. In 1312 he was granted a yearly fair at Shefford, Bedfordshire, near his manor of Campton. In 1313 he was among members of the court who he attended the King and Queen (Isabella of France) to Paris. In 1314 he was summoned for the campaign in Scotland in which the Bannockburn was fought, and in August of the following year was ordered to remain in the North for a winter campaign. He is recorded as being in the King's service in 1316–17. In November 1321 he was directed to refrain from attending a meeting of peers summoned by Thomas, 2nd Earl of Lancaster. In the following February he was ordered to bring his men to the King's aid, and on 16 March 1322 fought on the King's side at the Battle of Boroughbridge. In 1323 he was granted the wardship and marriage of Edmund Peverel, son and heir of Sir Robert Peverel. In 1324 he was summoned for service in an expedition to Gascony which did not go forward. In 1328 he made a pilgrimage to Santiago de Compostela. In 1332 he was appointed to the commission of the peace in Cambridgeshire.

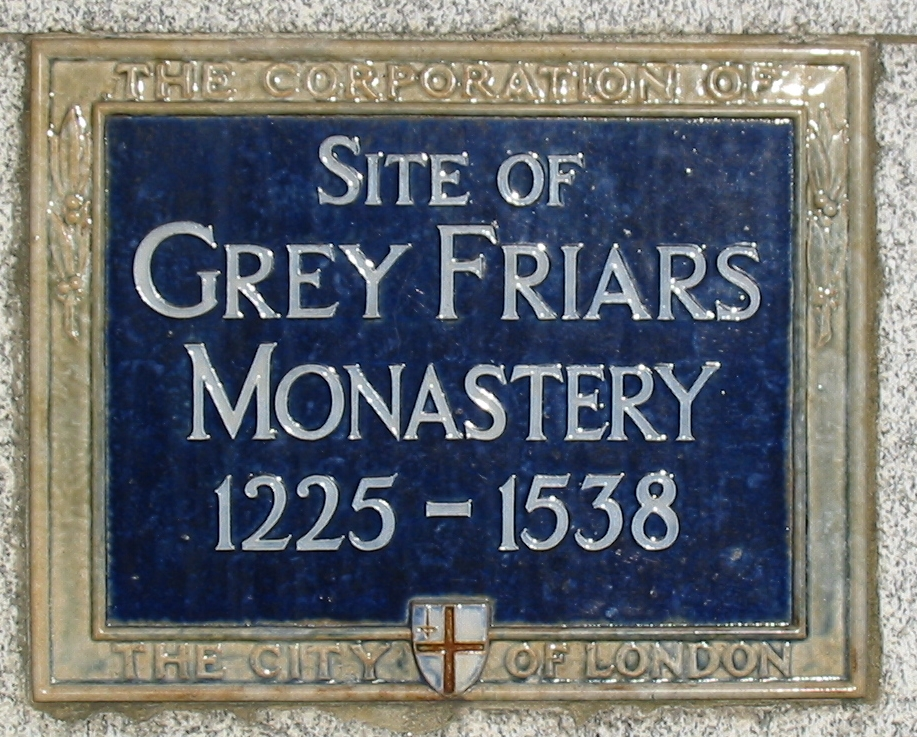
Plaque marking the site of the Greyfriars, London, where Robert de Lisle, 1st Baron Lisle, was buried

On 22 December 1336, in consideration of his 'enfeebled state', the King (Edward III) provided that he should not in future be compelled to aid the King in his wars, attend Parliament or councils, or be appointed to office; nonetheless, he was several times on commissions of the peace in Cambridgeshire until 15 March 1341, and was summoned to a council in February 1342.

His wife, Margaret, died in the summer of 1339 as he was about to travel to the continent on the King’s service, and after her death, he entered the Franciscan order, as a result of which, on 23 March 1342, his lands were taken into the King’s hands. According to Cokayne, he 'appears to have been ordained priest'. He died 4 January 1344, and was buried in the choir of the Franciscan church in London.

He was the owner of an illuminated manuscript, the Lisle Psalter, now Arundel 83 in the British Library, given by him to his daughter Audrey, a nun, who stipulated that after her death it should go to her sister, Aubrey, also a nun, and after Aubrey's death to Chicksands Priory, which had been built on land given by the de Lisle family near their manor at Campton, Bedfordshire. The manuscript was owned by the antiquary Lord William Howard (d.1640), younger son of Thomas Howard, 4th Duke of Norfolk (d.1572), who was likely responsible for binding the Lisle Psalter with the Howard Psalter and Hours.

== Marriage and issue ==
He married, about 9 July 1301, Margaret de Beauchamp, daughter of Walter de Beauchamp (d. 16 February 1303) of Alcester, Warwickshire, by Alice de Tony, daughter of Roger de Tony, by whom he had three sons and four daughters:

- John de Lisle, 2nd Baron Lisle, who married Maud de Grey, daughter of Henry de Grey, 3rd Baron Grey of Wilton.
- Robert de Lisle.
- Thomas de Lisle.
- Alice de Lisle, who married Sir Thomas de Seymour (c.1304 – before 13 July 1358) of Rode, Somerset, by whom she had no issue. According to Cokayne, she later married Robert Peverel, and died in 1349.
- Elizabeth de Lisle, who married, before 1330 her father's ward, Sir Edmund de Peverel (born c. 29 September 1306 – 12 March 1331), son and heir of Sir Robert Peverel, by whom she had a son, John, and a daughter, Margaret.
- Audrey de Lisle, who became a nun.
- Aubrey de Lisle, who became a nun.

== Notes ==
Peerage of England
New creation	Baron Lisle; 1295–1325	Succeeded by John de Lisle
