= John Lisle, 2nd Baron Lisle of Rougemont =

English peer and soldier

John de Lisle, 2nd Baron Lisle
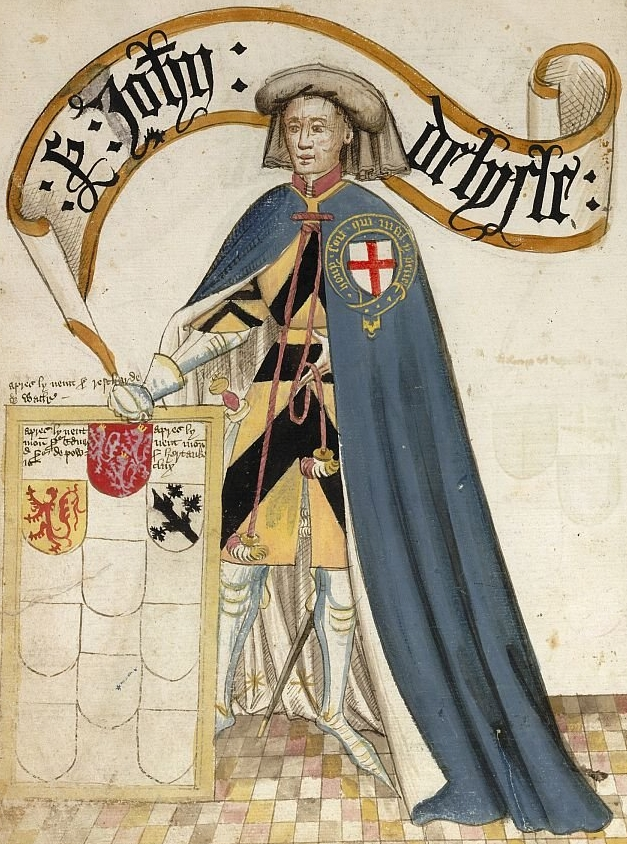
- John de Lisle, 2nd Baron Lisle, KG, ninth founder knight of the Order of the Garter, shown wearing his garter robes over his tunic displaying the arms of Lisle of Rougemont. Illustration from the 1430 Bruges Garter Book made by William Bruges (1375–1450), first Garter King of Arms
- Born: c. 1318
- Died: 14 October 1355 (aged 36–37)
- Spouse: Maud de Grey
- Issue: Robert de Lisle, 3rd Baron Lisle; John de Lisle; William de Lisle, 4th Baron Lisle; Alice de Lisle (possibly); Elizabeth de l'Isle
- Father: Robert de Lisle, 1st Baron Lisle
- Mother: Margaret de Beauchamp

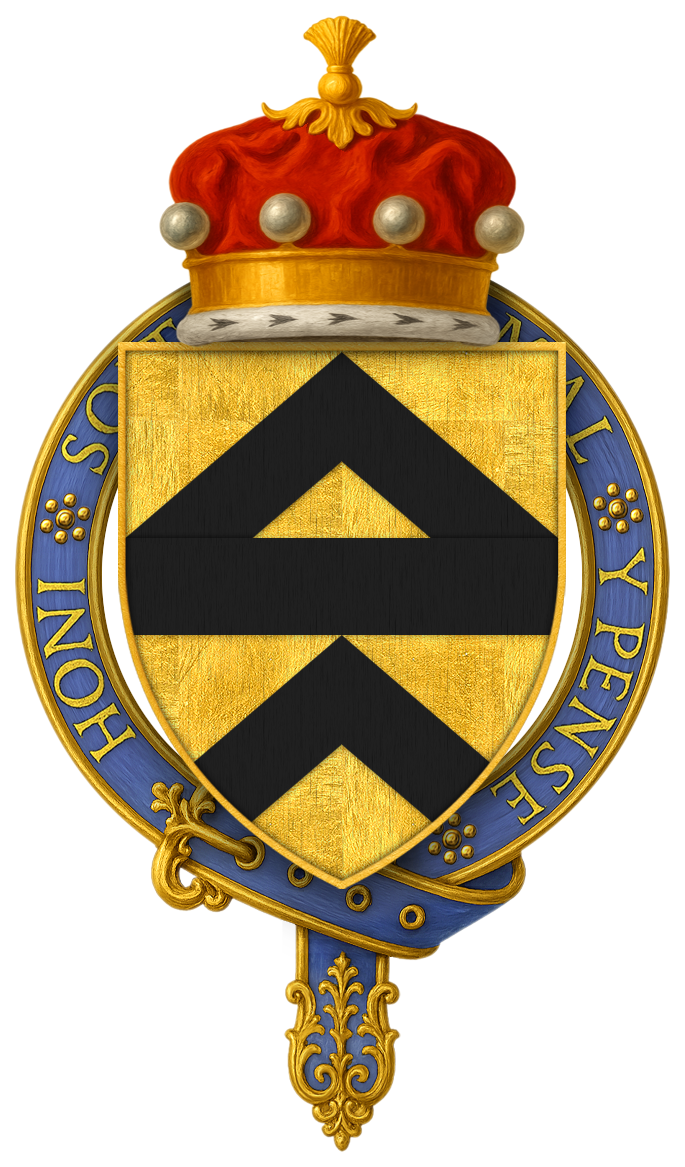
Arms of Sir John de Lisle, 2nd Baron Lisle, KG—or a fess between two chevrons sable

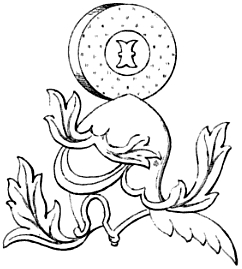
Crest of Baron Lisle, KG, drawn from his Garter stall plate in St George's Chapel, Windsor: A millstone argent pecked sable, the inner circle and the rim of the second, the fer-de-moline or

John de Lisle, 2nd Baron Lisle of Rougemont, KG (c. 1318 – 14 October 1355) was an English peer and soldier who spent much of his career serving in the wars in France. He was a companion of Edward III, and one of the founding members of the Order of the Garter in 1348.

== Life ==
John de Lisle, born about 1318, was the eldest son of Robert de Lisle, 1st Baron Lisle, and Margaret de Beauchamp, daughter of Sir Walter de Beauchamp (d. 16 February 1303) of Alcester, Warwickshire, by Alice de Tony, daughter of Roger de Tony.

At his marriage in 1332, his father gave him the manor of Campton in Bedfordshire. In 1336, during a period of illness, his father proposed to give him lands worth 400 marks a year, including the manor of Harewood in Yorkshire, to enable him to serve Edward III with six men-at-arms. In 1338 he saw service in the Scottish marches, and was present at the siege of Dunbar. In 1342 his father became a Franciscan friar, and is thought to have been ordained a priest; in consequence, on 23 March 1342, the Lisle lands were taken into the King's hands.

Much of Lisle's career was spent in France, serving in Edward III's wars. In October 1339, he was at Buironfosse with the King; however, Philip VI of France declined battle. In 1341 he was in Aquitaine, and in 1342 was in Brittany, where he was taken prisoner, but later exchanged for one William d'Ansenis, and where he commanded a force at the siege of Nantes. He returned to England, but on 20 January 1345, he was preparing to depart for Gascony with Henry of Grosmont, 1st Duke of Lancaster, then Earl of Derby. He took part with Walter de Mauny in the defence of the English fortress at Aiguillon, and was Captain and Warden of St Sauveur.

On 10 May 1346, he was granted an annuity of £40 for the duration of the wars in France, to be paid from the revenues of St Neots Priory. He was with the King in the campaign which began with the landing of English forces at La Hogue in the Cotentin on 12 July 1346, and culminated with the English victory at the Battle of Crecy on 26 August 1346. With his retinue of six knights, eleven esquires and twenty-three archers, Lisle fought at Crecy in the second battalion under William de Bohun, 1st Earl of Northampton. After the battle, he was created a knight banneret by the King, with an annuity of £200 in support of the dignity. He was also with the King at the siege of Calais, which capitulated on 4 August 1347. In December 1346 and in April 1347, he received general pardons 'on account of his good services in France'.

On 9 April 1347, he was with the King at a tournament at Lichfield, at which he was among eleven knights described as 'Knights of the King's Chamber', and in the same year took part in another tournament at Eltham Palace. He was made a Knight of the Garter at the foundation of the Order circa 1348. In June 1348, his lands were seized as he had gone abroad 'contrary to the proclamation'; he was pardoned in January 1349. In August 1349 and October 1350, the arrangements for his £200 annuity were altered, with the king granting him custody of the lands and heir of Gilbert Pecche as part payment. In August 1350 he was with the King's forces which defeated a Spanish fleet. Between 1347 and 1350, he was among those given 'capes and hoods of white long-cloth, wrought with men in blue, dancing, and buttoned in front with large pearls'. In January 1351 he was granted the indulgence occasioned by the papal Jubilee. In October 1351, he had licence to found a chantry at Harewood, and on 30 October 1351 was named Sheriff of Cambridgeshire and Huntingdonshire, and was given a lifetime appointment as Governor of Cambridge Castle. From 25 November 1350 to 15 March 1354 he was summoned to Parliament by writs directed Iohanni de Insula de Rubeo Monte.

In January 1353, he was again preparing for foreign service, and obtained a papal indult to take priests with him to hear the confessions of himself and members of his household. In the same month his wife, Maud, had licence to enter the Minoress convent at Aldgate, London. On 8 July 1355, he was pardoned for the death of Sir John de Goys, and sailed for Gascony with the King's eldest son, Edward the Black Prince. On 14 October 1355 he was slain in the course of a raid conducted by the Black Prince from Bordeaux to Narbonne. On 6 April 1356, his widow was assigned her dower at Harewood. She was still living on 3 January 1377.

The east window of Harewood church had an image of John de Lisle until its restoration in 1793.

== Marriage and issue ==
He married, before 16 December 1332, Maud de Grey, daughter of Henry de Grey, 3rd Baron Grey of Wilton (d. 10 or 16 December 1342), by whom he had three sons, and two daughters:

- Robert de Lisle, 3rd Baron Lisle (6 May 1336 – c. 1399), who married, successively, wives named Agnes and Margaret, whose parentage is unknown. He had an illegitimate son, William de Lisle of Waterperry, Oxfordshire, but died without legitimate issue. He was summoned to Parliament by writs directed Roberto de Insula de Rubeo Monte.
- John de Lisle (born 1339)
- William de Lisle, 4th Baron Lisle, who succeeded his elder brother, Robert de Lisle, 3rd Baron Lisle, but died, apparently unmarried and without issue, before June 1428, at which time any barony created by writ presumably fell into abeyance among the daughters of Robert de Lisle, 1st Baron Lisle
- Alice de Lisle, who married, firstly, Robert de Holand; secondly, Sir Edmund de Hengrave; thirdly, Richard Wychingham
- Elizabeth, married William de Aldeburgh, 1st Baron Aldeburgh, who died on 1 October 1387

== Notes ==
Peerage of England
Preceded by Robert Lisle	Baron Lisle; 1344–1355	Succeeded by Robert Lisle
