= Hugh Wrottesley =

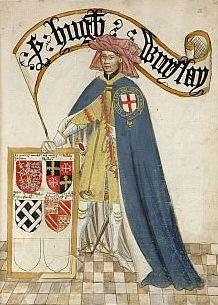

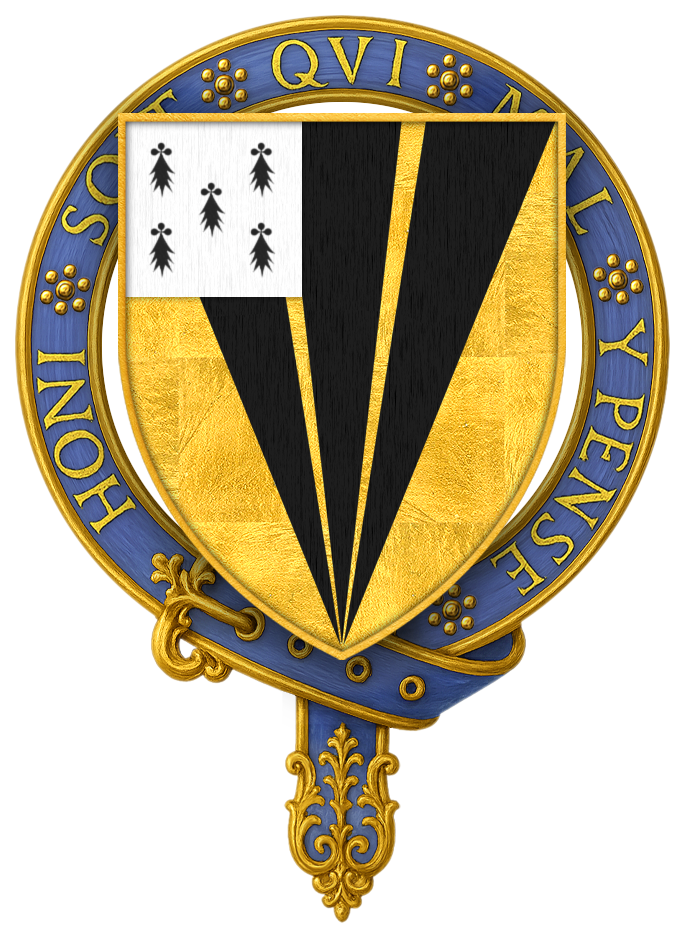
Arms of Sir Hugh de Wrottesley, KG

Sir Hugh Wrottesley, KG (fl. 1334 - d. 23 January 1381), was a founder member and 18th Knight of the Order of the Garter in 1348.

== Life ==
He was the son of Sir William Wrottesley, and lord of Wrottesley in Staffordshire. He participated in King Edward III's expedition to the Low Countries in 1338–1339.

Sir Hugh's descendants by the second wife Isabel and son John became peers Baronets and Barons Wrottesley after several generations.

His armorials were described as follows by George Wrottesley, in his History of the family of Wrottesley of Wrottesley, co. Stafford: "The Radcliffes of Ordsall, co. Lancaster, held Moberley and Sandbach, under the Ardernes of Aldford, and Sir Hugh Wrottesley, after his marriage with Isabella, appears to have assumed the Arms of Radcliffe with a change of tincture, for these Arms, viz, " Or, a bend engrailed Gules," have been ascribed to him by Ashmole, in his "History of the Garter", on the authority of an Armorial in the College of Arms".
