= Henry Eam =

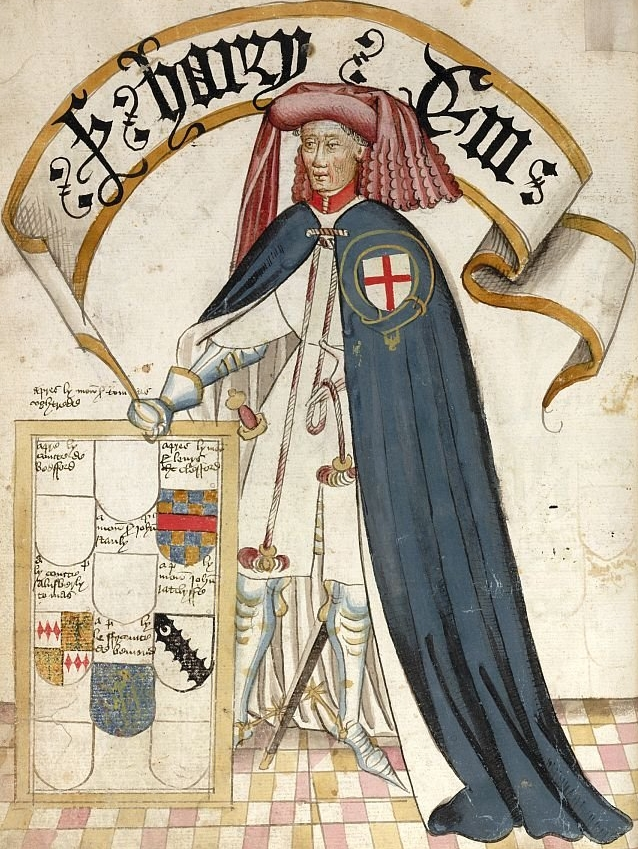

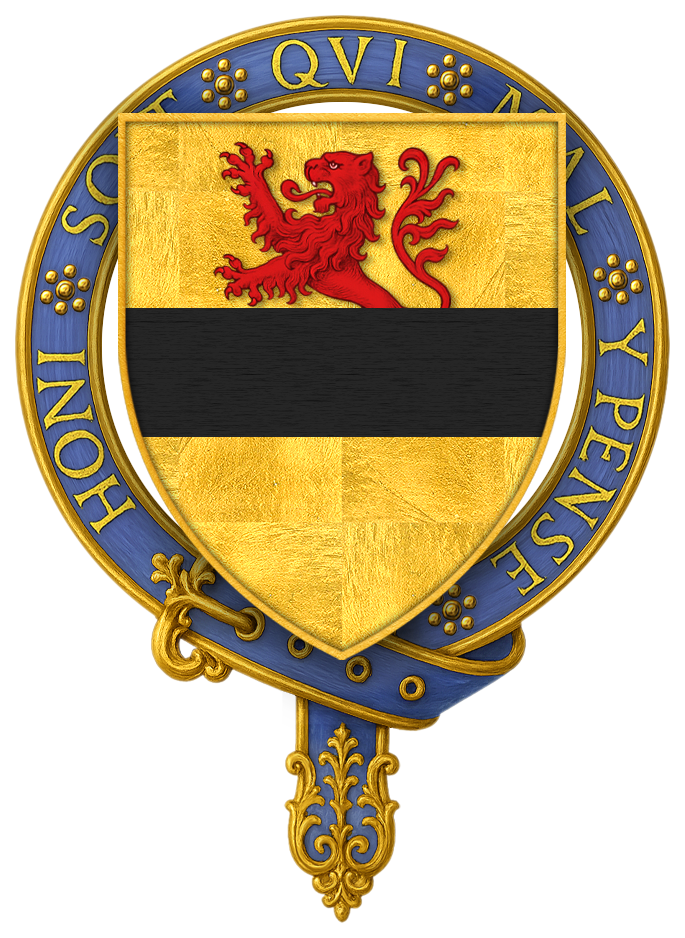
Arms of Sir Henry Eam, KG

Sir Henry Eam (also spelled Esme, Em and Eme; died before 1360) was a Founder Knight of the Order of the Garter.

Very little is known about him. A native of Brabant, it is thought he was one of the knights who came to England on the invitation of Edward III in January 1343/4. His inclusion among the companions when the Order was founded in 1348 has been attributed to his success at jousting.

Eam afterwards entered the service of Edward, the Black Prince. The last mention of him is in a list of the Prince's accounts dated 15 May 1358. He died before 1360, when Sir Thomas Ughtred succeeded to his stall in St George's Chapel.
