= Thomas Wale (Knight of the Garter) =

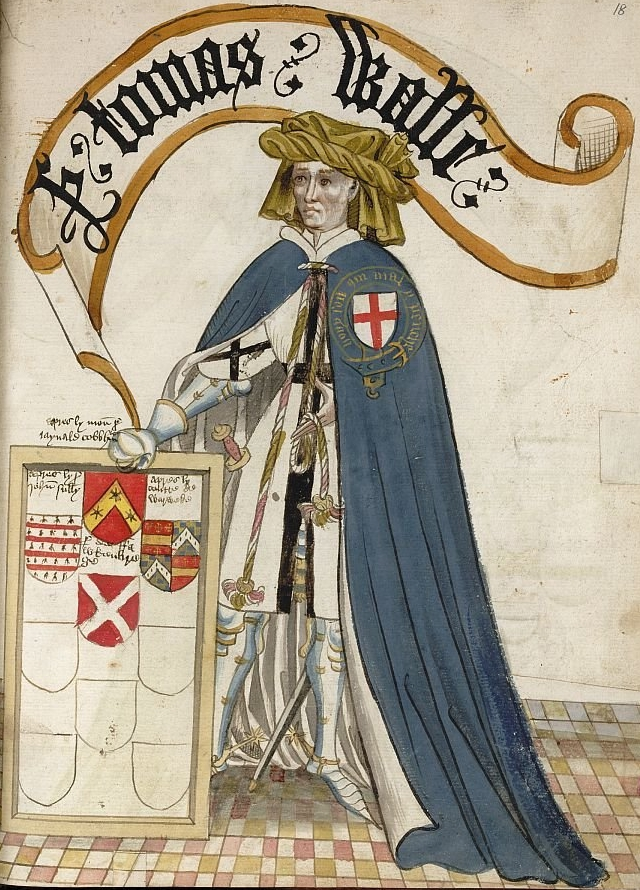

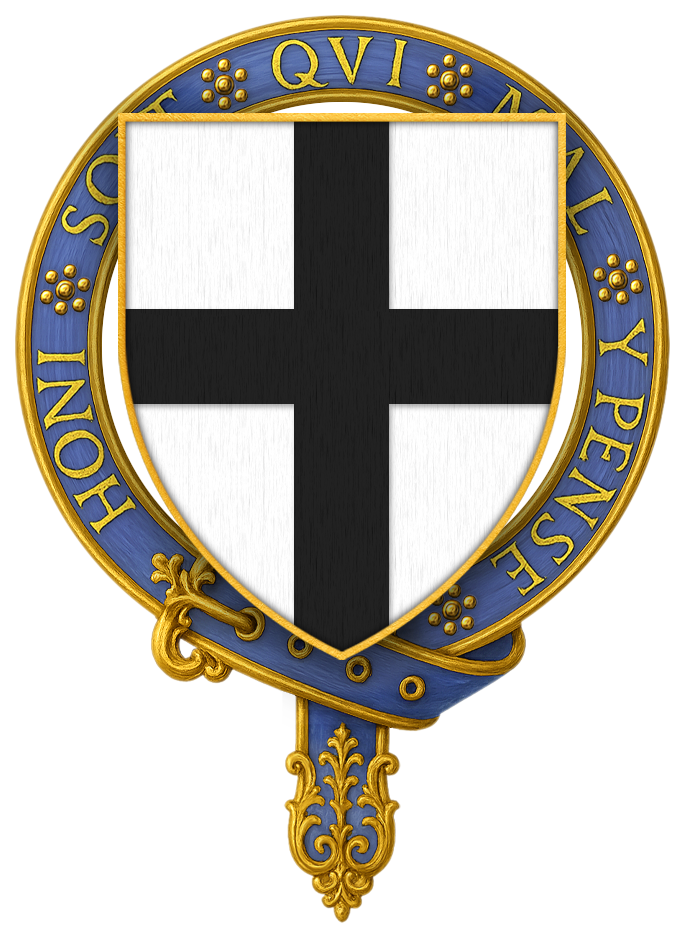
Garter-encircled Arms of Sir Thomas Wale, KG, viz: "Argent a cross Sable."

Sir Thomas Wale (1303 – 26 October 1352) was an English soldier and a founder member Knight of the Garter.

He was born, probably in Weedon Pinkney, Northamptonshire, to Sir Thomas Wale and his wife Lucy, Lady of the Manor of Weedon Pinkney. His father died in or shortly before 1315, after which his mother successfully fought a lawsuit with her cousin Edmund Pinkney for possession of the family estates. She died in 1343.

In 1339 he fought in Flanders under King Edward III and in 1342 fought under William de Bohun, 1st Earl of Northampton, in a military expedition to Brittany. In 1344 he was fighting overseas with Richard Fitzalan, 3rd Earl of Arundel.

In 1348 he was invested, with 23 other knights, into the new Order of the Garter established by Edward III and was allocated stall 18 in the home of the order, St George's Chapel, Windsor.

He died in Gascony in 1352. He had married Nichola but left no children. Most of his estates, which included Litchborough, passed to his nephew Sir Peter Mallore, son of his sister Margaret, who had married into another prominent Northamptonshire family. Peter sat in the English House of Commons, was High Sheriff of Northamptonshire in 1351 and served in the late 1350s as a judge in Ireland.
