= Order of the Garter =

British order of chivalry

Most Noble Order of the Garter
- Badge of the Order of the Garter: The attributed arms of Saint George circumscribed by the Garter

Awarded by the Monarch of the United Kingdom
- Type: Dynastic order
- Established: 1348; 678 years ago
- Motto: Honi soit qui mal y pense (Anglo-Norman for "Shamed be [the person] who thinks evil of it" or "Shame on him who thinks evil of it")
- Criteria: At the monarch's pleasure
- Status: Currently constituted
- Founder: Edward III
- Sovereign: Charles III
- Chancellor: The Baroness Manningham-Buller
- Prelate: The Bishop of Winchester (ex officio)
- Classes: Royal Knight/Lady (Companion); Stranger Knight/Lady Companion; Knight/Lady Companion; (all abbreviated as KG/LG)

Statistics
- First induction: 1348
- Total inductees: Edward III: 62; Richard II: 29; Henry IV: 27; Henry V: 21; Henry VI: 44; Edward IV: 36; Edward V: 0; Richard III: 8; Henry VII: 37; Henry VIII: 53; Edward VI: 13; Mary I & Philip: 9; Elizabeth I: 54; James I: 29; Charles I: 21; Charles II: 47; James II: 7; Mary II & William III: 14; Anne: 14; George I: 21; George II: 32; George III: 75; George IV: 14; William IV: 14; Victoria: 132; Edward VII: 27; George V: 45; Edward VIII: 0; George VI: 31; Elizabeth II: 110; Charles III: 10; Tally: 1,035

Precedence
- Next (higher): George Cross
- Next (lower): Order of the Thistle
- Ribbon of the Order of the Garter

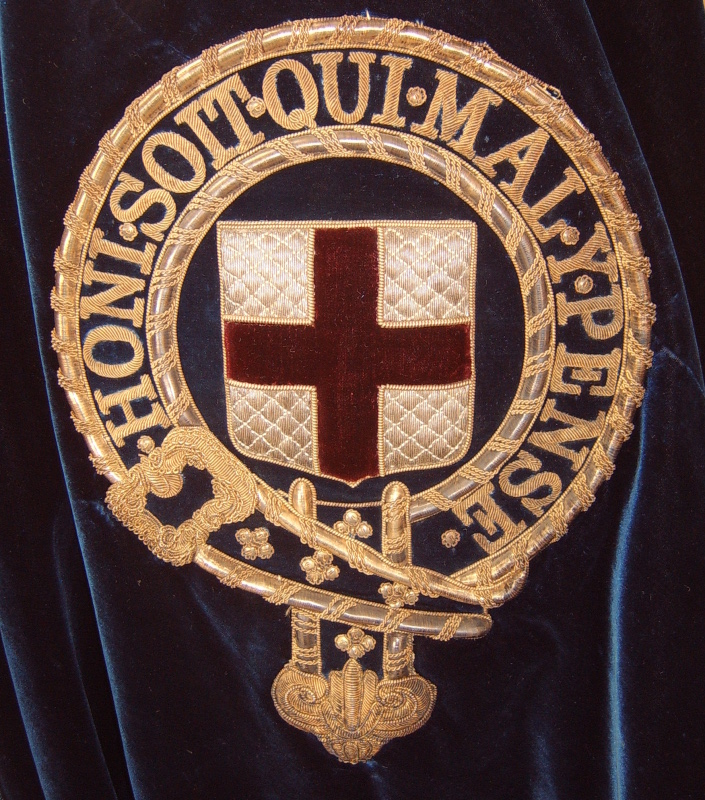
Badge of the Order embroidered onto the left shoulder of a Knight's blue velvet mantle

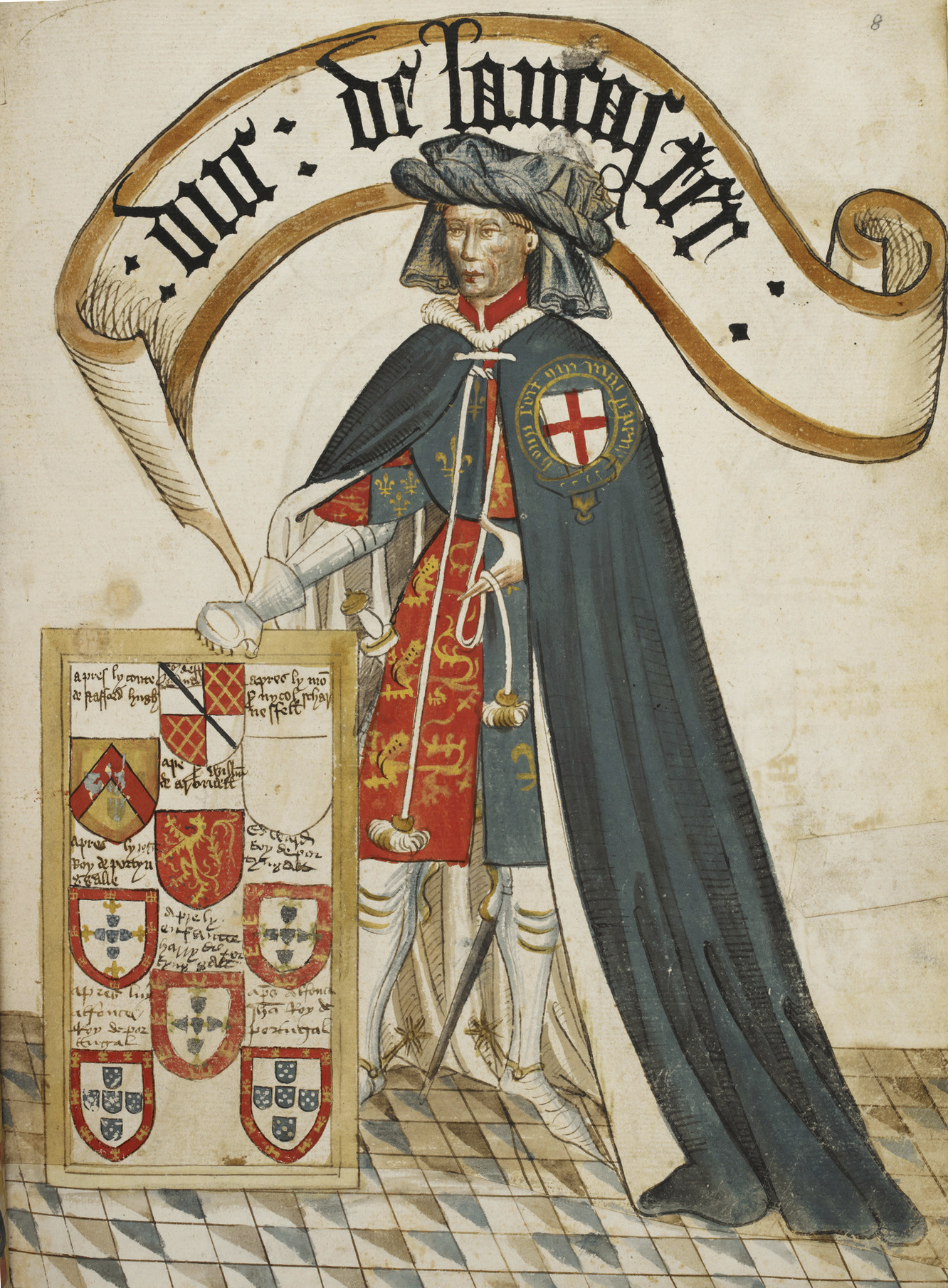
Henry of Grosmont, Earl (later Duke) of Lancaster (d. 1361), the second appointee of the Order, shown wearing a tabard displaying the royal arms of England over which is his blue mantle or garter robe. Illuminated miniature from the Bruges Garter Book c. 1430 by William Bruges, first Garter King of Arms

The Most Noble Order of the Garter is an order of chivalry founded by King Edward III in 1348. The most senior order of knighthood in the British honours system, it is outranked in precedence only by the decorations of the Victoria Cross and the George Cross. The Order of the Garter is dedicated to the image and arms of Saint George, England's patron saint.

Appointments are at the Sovereign's sole discretion, typically made in recognition of national contribution, service to the Crown, or for distinguished personal service to the Monarch. Membership of the order is limited to the sovereign, the Prince of Wales, and no more than 24 living members, or Companions. The order also includes Supernumerary Knights and Ladies (e.g., members of the British royal family and foreign monarchs).

The order's emblem is a garter circlet with the motto Honi soit qui mal y pense (Anglo-Norman for "shamed be (the person) who thinks evil of it", in older translations "evil be to him who thinks of evil") in gold script. Members of the order wear it on ceremonial occasions.

== History ==
King Edward III founded the Order of the Garter around the time of his claim to the French throne. The traditional year of foundation is usually given as 1348 (when it was formally proclaimed). However, The Complete Peerage, under "The Founders of the Order of the Garter", states the order was first instituted on 23 April 1344, listing each founding member as knighted in 1344. The list includes Sir Sanchet D'Abrichecourt, of whom the latest notice (according to the book) is 20 October 1345. Other dates from 1344 to 1351 have also been proposed. The King's wardrobe account shows Garter habits first issued in the autumn of 1348. Also, its original statutes required that each member of the Order already be a knight (what would now be referred to as a knight bachelor) and some of the initial members listed were only knighted that year. Its foundation is likely to have been inspired by the Order of the Band, established in about 1330 in Castile.

=== List of Founder Knights ===
At the time of its foundation, the Order consisted of King Edward III, together with 25 Founder Knights, listed in ascending order of stall number in St George's Chapel:

- King Edward III (1312–1377)
- Edward the Black Prince, Prince of Wales (1330–1376)
- Henry of Grosmont, 4th Earl of Lancaster (c. 1310–1361)
- Thomas de Beauchamp, 11th Earl of Warwick (1313–1369)
- Jean de Grailly, III Captal de Buch (d. 1376)
- Ralph de Stafford, 1st Earl of Stafford (1301–1372)
- William de Montacute, 2nd Earl of Salisbury (1328–1397)
- Roger Mortimer, 2nd Earl of March (1328–1360)
- John, 2nd Baron Lisle (1318–1355)
- Bartholomew, 2nd Baron Burghersh (c. 1329–1369)
- John, 1st Baron Beauchamp (d. 1360)
- John, 2nd Baron Mohun (c. 1320–1376)
- Sir Hugh de Courtenay (1327–1349)
- Thomas Holland, 1st Earl of Kent (1314–1360)
- John, 1st Baron Grey de Rotherfield (1300–1359)
- Sir Richard Fitz-Simon (1295–1348/49)
- Sir Miles Stapleton of Bedale (c. 1320–1364)
- Sir Thomas Wale (1303–1352)
- Sir Hugh Wrottesley (d. 1381)
- Sir Nele Loring (1320–1386)
- Sir John Chandos (c. 1320–1369)
- Sir James Audley (c. 1318–1369)
- Sir Otho Holand (c. 1316–1359)
- Sir Henry Eam (d. before 1360)
- Sir Sanchet D'Abrichecourt (c. 1330–1359)
- Sir Walter Paveley (1319–1375)

They are all depicted by individual portraits in the Bruges Garter Book compiled c. 1431, and now in the British Library.

=== Legendary origins ===
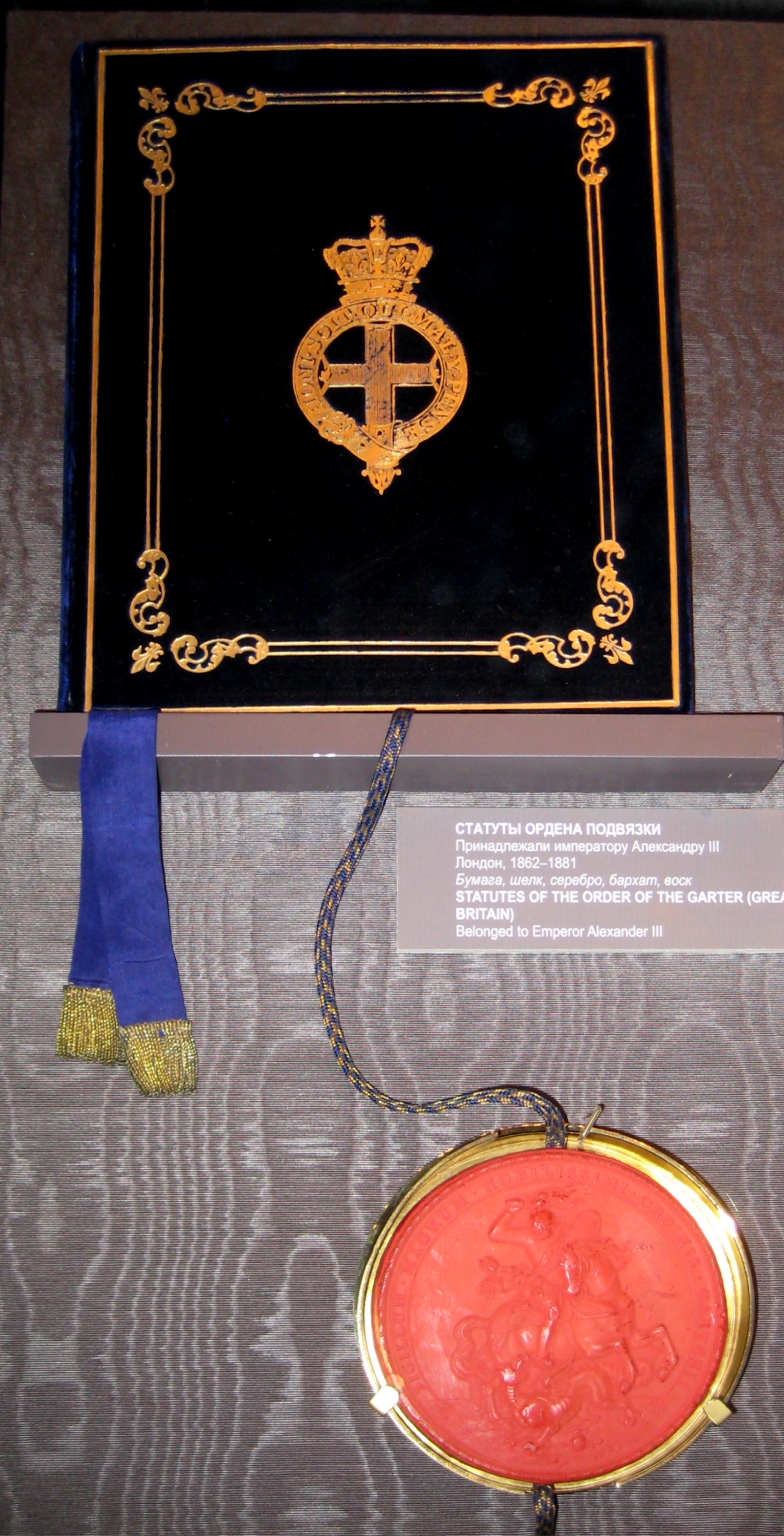
Statutes of the Order of the Garter, this copy having once belonged to Emperor Alexander III of Russia

Various legends account for the origin of the Order. The most popular involves the "Countess of Salisbury", whose garter is said to have slipped from her leg while she was dancing at a court ball at Calais. When the surrounding courtiers sniggered, the King picked it up and returned it to her, exclaiming, "Honi soit qui mal y pense" ("Shame on him who thinks ill of it"), which phrase has become the Order's motto. However, the earliest written version of this story dates from the 1460s, and it seems to have been conceived as a retrospective explanation for the adoption of what was then seen as an item of female underclothing as the symbol of a band of knights. In fact, at the time of the Order's establishment in the mid-14th century, garters were predominantly an item of male attire.

According to another legend, King Richard I was inspired in the 12th century by St George the Martyr while fighting in the Crusades to tie garters around the legs of his knights, who subsequently won the battle. King Edward supposedly recalled the event in the 14th century when he founded the Order. This story is recounted in a letter to The Annual Register in 1774:

In Rastel's Chronicle, I. vi. under the life of Edward III is the following curious passage: "About the 19 yere [sic] of this kinge, he made a solempne feest at Wyndesore, and a greate justes and turnament, where he devysed, and perfyted substanegally, (Note: Dibdin's 1811 edition of Rastell's 'The Pastime of People, Or, The Chronicles of Divers Realms; and Most Especially of the Realm of England' gives this word as 'substancyally'.) the order of the knyghtes of the garter; howe be it some afferme that this order began fyrst by kynge Rycharde, Cure de Lyon, at the sege of the citye of Acres; where, in his great necessyte, there were but 26 knyghtes that fyrmely and surely abode by the kynge; where he caused all them to were thonges of blew leyther about theyr legges. And afterwarde they were called the knyghtes of the blew thonge." I am obliged for this passage to John Fenn, Esq; a curious and ingenious gentleman of East-Dereham, in Norfolk, who is in possession of the most rare book whence it is taken. Hence some affirm, that the origin of the garter is to be dated from Richard I* and that it owes its pomp and splendor to Edward III.

*Winstanley, in his Life of Edward III says that the original book of the institution deduces the invention from King Richard the First.

The motto in fact refers to Edward's claim to the French throne, and the Order of the Garter was created to help pursue this claim. The use of the garter as an emblem may have derived from straps used to fasten armour, and may have been chosen because it held overtones of a tight-knit "band" or "bond" of knightly "supporters" of Edward's cause.

There is a connection between the Order of the Garter and the Middle English poem Sir Gawain and the Green Knight (late 14th century). The motto is inscribed, as hony soyt qui mal pence, at the end of the text in the sole surviving manuscript in the British Library, albeit in a later hand. In the poem, a girdle, very similar in its erotic undertones to the garter, plays a prominent role. A rough equivalent of the Order's motto has been identified in Gawain's exclamation corsed worth cowarddyse and couetyse boþe ('cursed be both cowardice and coveting', v. 2374). While the author of that poem remains disputed, there seems to be a connection between two of the top candidates and the Order of the Garter, John of Gaunt, 1st Duke of Lancaster, and Enguerrand de Coucy, seventh Sire de Coucy. De Coucy was married to King Edward III's daughter, Isabella, and was given admittance to the Order of the Garter on their wedding day."

=== Ladies of the Garter ===
Soon after the founding of the order, women were appointed "Ladies of the Garter", but some historians argue that they were not appointed companions, as they were not knights. Queen Philippa was the first lady to be appointed in 1358. King Henry VII discontinued the practice in 1488; his mother, Lady Margaret Beaufort, was the last Lady of the Garter before Queen Alexandra.

Except for female sovereigns, the next Lady of the Garter named was Queen Alexandra, by her husband King Edward VII. King George V also made his consort, Queen Mary, a Lady of the Garter and King George VI subsequently did the same for his wife, Queen Elizabeth, and his daughter Princess Elizabeth (later Queen Elizabeth II). Throughout the 20th century, women continued to be associated with the Order, but save for foreign female monarchs, they were not made Companions.

In 1987, by a statute of Queen Elizabeth II, the installation of "Ladies Companion of the Garter" became possible. Unlike previous queens consort, Queen Camilla was named a Royal Lady of the Garter by her mother-in-law, Queen Elizabeth II, when she was still the Duchess of Cornwall.

In 2022, Valerie Amos, Baroness Amos, became the first black Lady Companion of the Order since its foundation. Eliza Manningham-Buller, Baroness Manningham-Buller, became the first Lady Companion to be appointed chancellor of the Order, on 18 June 2024.

== Composition ==
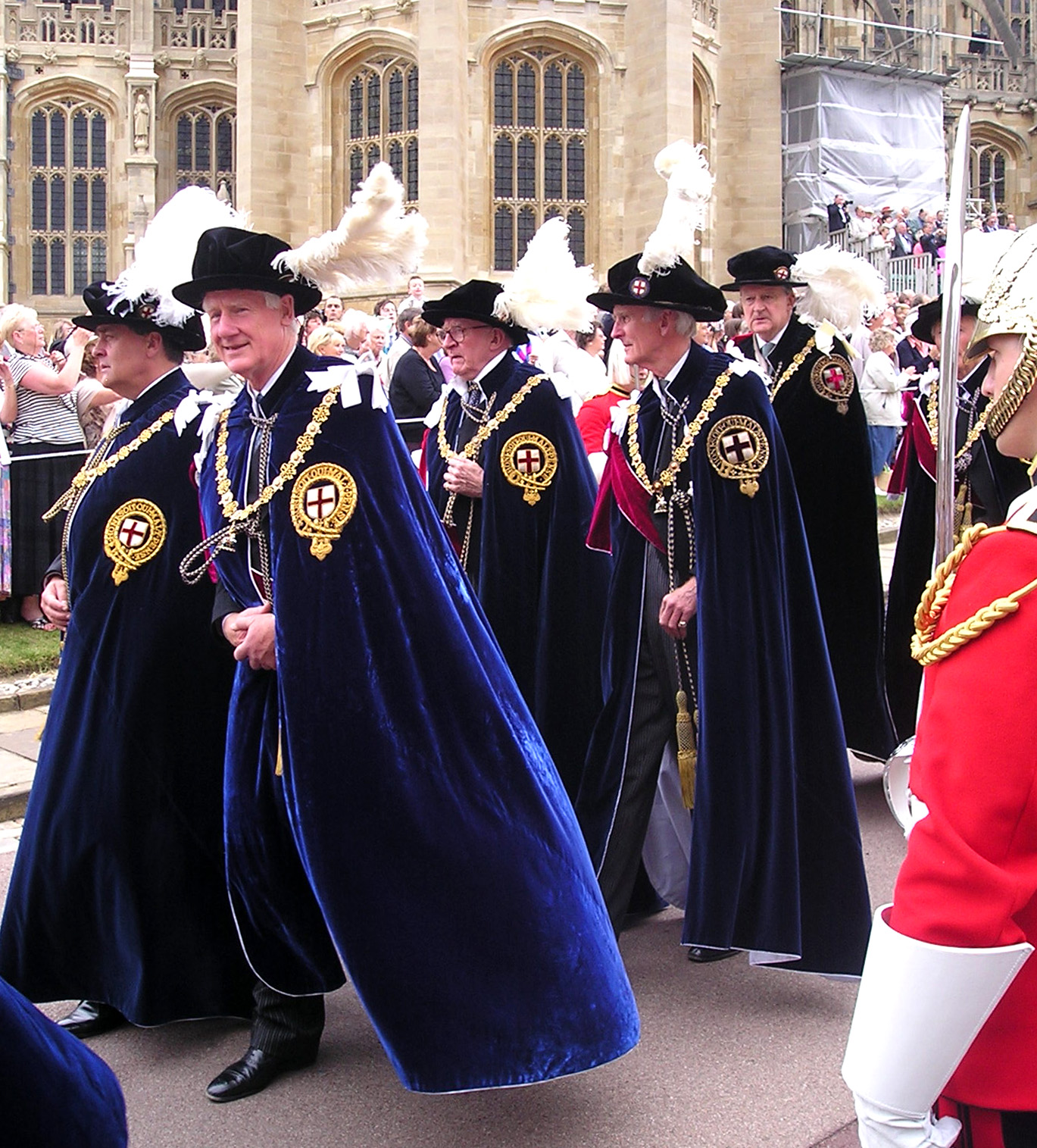
Knights Companion processing to St George's Chapel, Windsor for the Garter Service

=== Members ===
Membership in the Order is strictly limited and includes the Monarch, the Prince of Wales, not more than 24 Companion members, and various supernumerary members. The monarch alone decides who is appointed. The monarch is known as the Sovereign of the Garter, and the Prince of Wales is known as a Royal Knight Companion of the Garter.

Male members of the Order are titled "Knights Companion" and female members are called "Ladies Companion". Formerly, the sovereign filled vacancies upon the nomination of the members. Each member would nominate nine candidates, of whom three had to have the rank of earl or higher, three the rank of baron or higher, and three the rank of knight or higher. The sovereign would choose as many nominees as were necessary to fill any vacancies in the order. They were not obliged to choose those who received the most nominations. Candidates were last nominated in 1860, and appointments have since been made by the sovereign acting alone, with no prior nominations. The statutes prescribing the former procedure were not amended, however, until 1953.

From the 18th century, the sovereign made their choices on the advice of the government. In 1946, with the agreement of Prime Minister Clement Attlee and Opposition Leader Winston Churchill, membership of Great Britain's highest ranking orders of chivalry (the Order of the Garter, the Order of the Thistle and the dormant Order of St Patrick) became a personal gift of the Sovereign once again. Thus, the sovereign personally selects Knights and Ladies Companion of the Garter, without political influence. Appointments are typically announced on Saint George's Day (23 April).

=== Supernumerary members ===
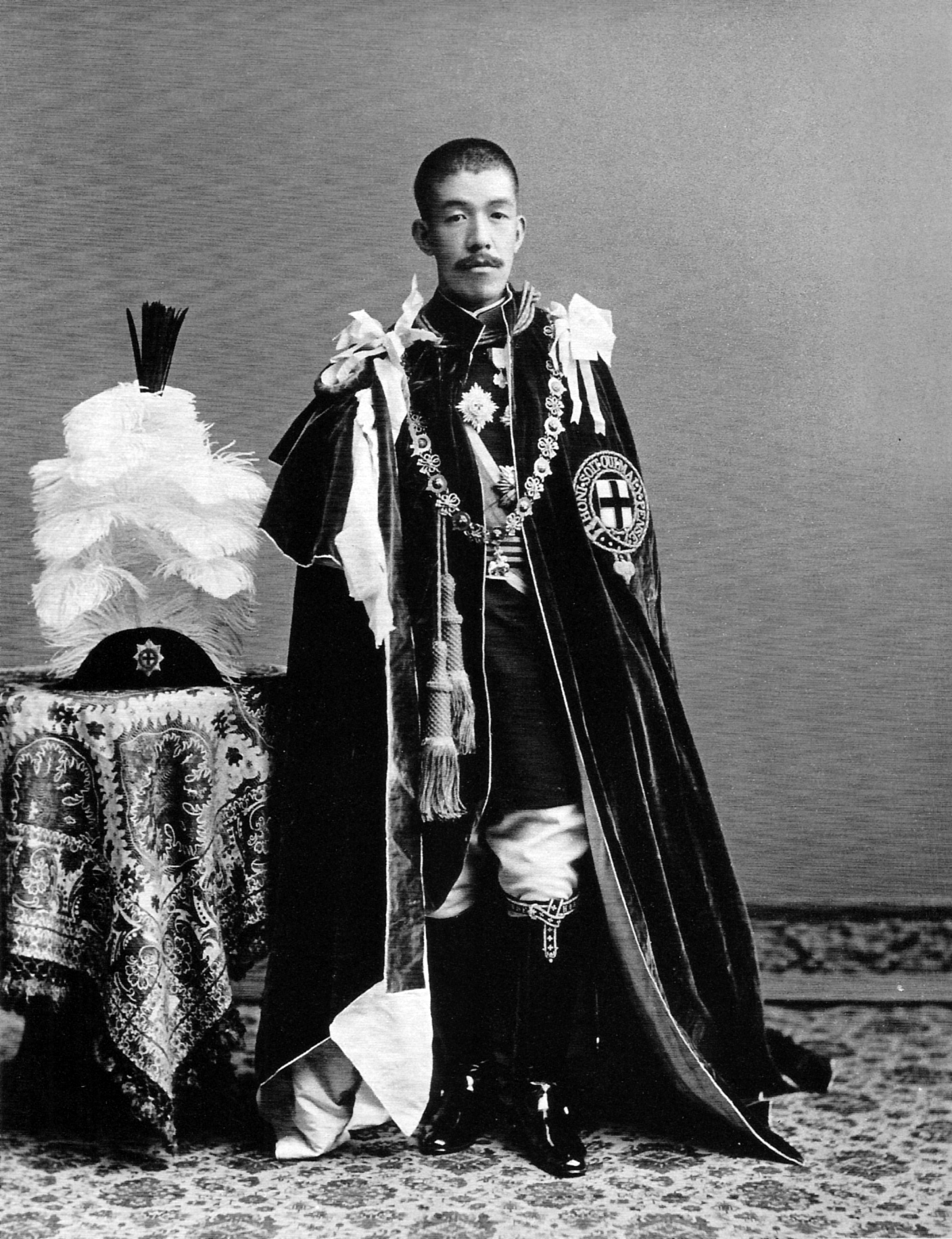
Emperor Taishō, after the 1902 Anglo-Japanese Alliance, in his Garter robes

The Order includes supernumerary members, whose number do not count towards the limit of 24 companions. Several supernumerary members, known as "Royal Knights and Ladies of the Garter", belong to the royal family. These titles were introduced in 1786 by King George III so that his many sons would not curtail the number of non-royal companions. He created the statute of supernumerary members in 1805 so that any descendant of King George II could be installed as such a member. In 1831, this statute was extended again to include all descendants of King George I.

With the installation of Emperor Alexander I of Russia in 1813, supernumerary membership was extended to foreign monarchs, who are known as "Stranger Knights and Ladies of the Garter". Each such installation originally required the enactment of a statute; however, a 1954 statute authorises the regular admission of Stranger Knights or Ladies without further special enactments.

=== Degradation of members ===
The sovereign may "degrade" members who have taken up arms against the Crown. From the late 15th century, there was a formal ceremony of degradation, in which Garter King of Arms, accompanied by the rest of the Heralds, processed to St George's Chapel. While the Garter King read aloud the Instrument of Degradation, a Herald climbed up a ladder and removed the former Knight's banner, crest, helm, and sword, throwing them down into the quire. Then the rest of the Heralds kicked them down the length of the chapel, out of the doors, and into the castle ditch. The last such formal degradation was that of James Butler, 2nd Duke of Ormonde, in 1716.

During the First World War, two Royal Knights and six Stranger Knights, all monarchs or princes of enemy nations and including Kaiser Wilhelm II of Germany, Emperor Franz Joseph I of Austria, and Prince Henry of Prussia, were struck off the roll of the order, their appointments being annulled in 1915. The banner of King Victor Emmanuel III was removed from the chapel after Italy entered World War II against the United Kingdom and its allies in 1940. The banner of Emperor Hirohito was removed from St George's Chapel when Japan entered World War II in 1941, but that banner and his knighthood were restored by Elizabeth II in 1971, when Hirohito made a state visit to the United Kingdom. The Emperor was particularly pleased by the restoration to the Garter.

In 2025, Andrew Mountbatten-Windsor (formerly Prince Andrew, Duke of York) was struck off the roll and his banner was removed from the chapel amidst ongoing controversy surrounding his association with Jeffrey Epstein. His appointment was annulled on 30 October 2025.

=== Officers ===
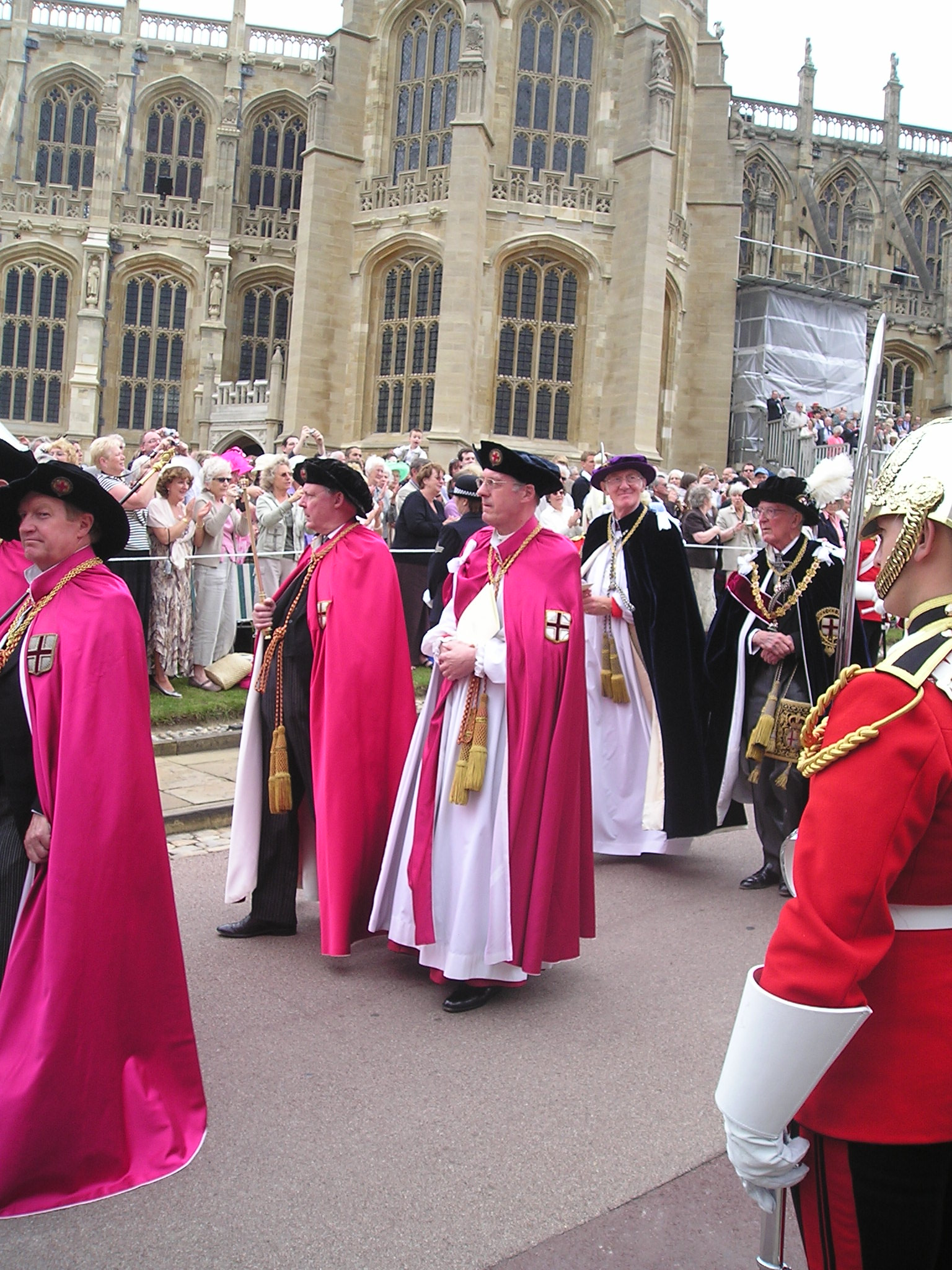
Officers of the Order of the Garter (left to right): Secretary (barely visible), Black Rod, Garter Principal King of Arms, Register, Prelate, Chancellor

The Order has six officers: the Prelate, the Chancellor, the Register, the Garter Principal King of Arms, the Usher, and the Secretary. The offices of Prelate, Register, and Usher were created on the order's establishment; those of Garter Principal King of Arms and Chancellor, in the 15th century; and that of Secretary, in the 20th century.

William of Edington, Bishop of Winchester, was the first Prelate of the Order, and that office has since been held by his successors at Winchester, traditionally a senior bishopric of the Church of England.

The office of Chancellor is now held by one of the companions of the order. For most of its existence, the Bishop of Salisbury has held the office, although laymen held it from 1553 to 1671. In 1837, after boundary changes made Windsor Castle fall in the diocese of Oxford, the Chancellorship was transferred to the Bishop of Oxford. A century later, the Bishop of Salisbury challenged this transfer, on the grounds that the Chancellorship had been attached to his office regardless of the diocese in which the chapel of the order lay; and that, in any event, St George's Chapel, as a royal peculiar, was not under diocesan jurisdiction. The office of Chancellor was removed from the Bishop of Oxford (the outgoing bishop, Thomas Strong, had been outspoken in the Edward VIII abdication crisis), and so it was withheld from his successor, Kenneth Kirk, and has since been held by one of the Knights and Ladies Companion.

The office of Register has been held by the Dean of Windsor since 1558. The Garter Principal King of Arms is ex officio the senior officer of the College of Arms (the heraldic authority of England), and is usually appointed from among the other officers of arms at the College. As the title suggests, Garter Principal King of Arms has specific duties as the Order's officer of arms, attending to the companions' coats of arms and banners of arms, which are exhibited in the chapel. The Secretary, who acts as deputy to Garter in the ceremonial aspects of the Order, has since 1952 typically also been selected from the other officers of the College of Arms. The office of Usher is held by the Usher of the Black Rod, who is also the Serjeant-at-Arms of the House of Lords.

- Prelate: Philip Mounstephen, Bishop of Winchester (ex officio, 2023)
- Chancellor: Eliza Manningham-Buller, Baroness Manningham-Buller LG, DCB, HonFRS, FMedSci (2024)
- Register: Christopher Cocksworth, Dean of Windsor (ex officio, 2023)
- King of Arms: James Peill FSA, Garter Principal King of Arms (ex officio, 2026)
- Secretary: Lieutenant Colonel Stephen Segrave (2024)
- Usher: Lieutenant General Ed Davis RM, CB, CBE, KStJ, Gentleman Usher of the Black Rod (ex officio, 2025)

== Military Knights of Windsor ==
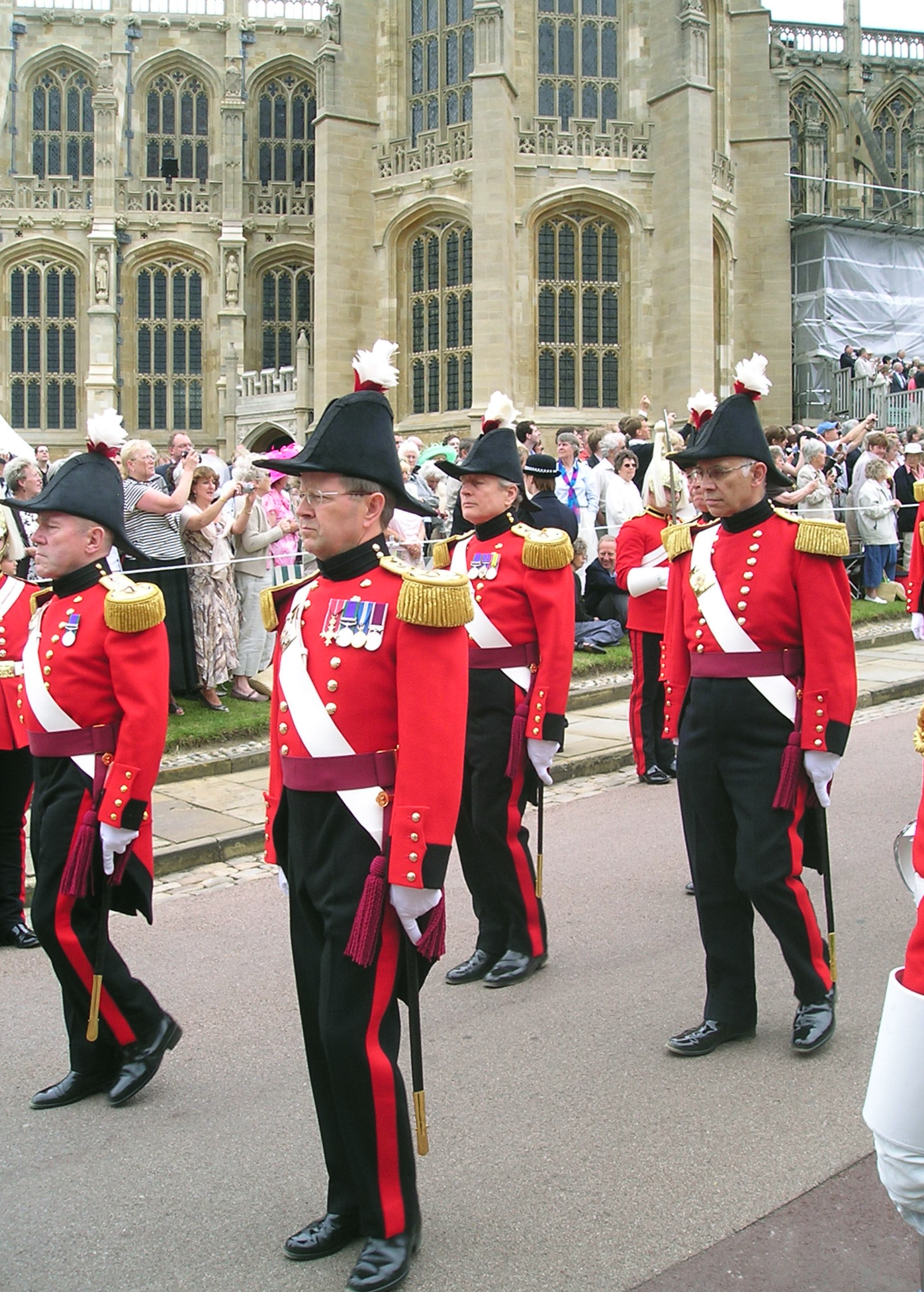
Military Knights of Windsor in the procession to the Garter Service

At the founding of the Order of the Garter, 26 bedesmen called "poor knights" were appointed and attached to the Order and its chapel. This number was not always maintained, and by the 17th century, there were only thirteen such knights. King Charles II increased the number to 18 (in large part because of funds allocated from Sir Francis Crane's will) after his coronation in 1660. After the knights objected to being termed "poor", King William IV redesignated them in the 19th century as the Military Knights of Windsor.

The poor knights were impoverished retired military officers, required to pray daily for the Knights Companion. In return, they received a salary and lodging in Windsor Castle. The knights are no longer necessarily poor, but are still retired military officers. They participate in the Order's processions, escorting the members, and in the chapel services. However, they are not considered members of the Order.

The poor knights originally wore red mantles, each of which bore St George's Cross, but did not depict the Garter. Queen Elizabeth I replaced the mantles in the 16th and 17th centuries with blue and purple gowns, but the red mantles returned in the 17th century under King Charles I. When the knights were renamed, the mantles were abandoned. The military knights now wear the old military uniform of an "army officer on the unattached list": black trousers with red stripe, a red double-breasted swallow-tailed coat, gold epaulets and brushes, a cocked hat with a plume, and a sword on a white baldric.

== Robes and insignia ==
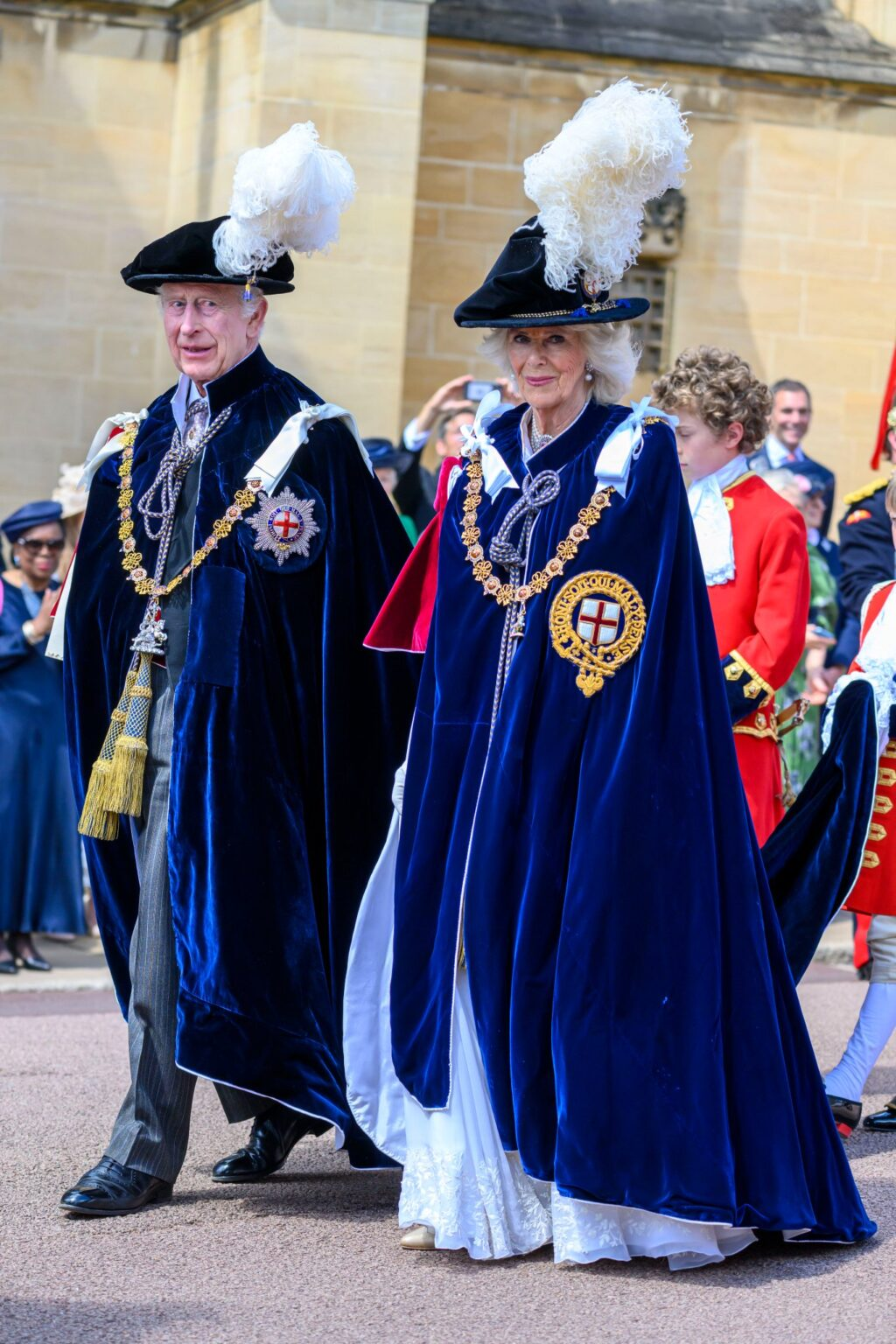
King Charles III and Queen Camilla wearing their insignia on Garter Day in 2024.

=== Members ===
==== Order's ceremonial occasions ====
For the Order's ceremonial occasions, such as the annual Garter Day, the members wear elaborate vestments and accoutrements, which include:

- The mantle is a vestment or robe worn by members since the 15th century. Once made of wool, by the 16th century it was made of velvet. The mantle was originally purple, but varied during the 17th and 18th centuries between celestial blue, pale blue, royal blue, dark blue, violet, and ultramarine. Mantles are now dark blue and lined with white taffeta. The mantles of the Sovereign, the Prince of Wales, and Royal Knights and Ladies end in trains. The heraldic shield of St George's Cross encircled by the Garter is sewn onto the left shoulder of the mantle, but the Sovereign's mantle instead has the star of the Order. Attached to the mantle over the right shoulder are a dark red velvet hood and surcoat, which have lost all function over time and appear to the modern observer simply as a splash of colour.
- The hat is a Tudor bonnet of black velvet with a plume of white ostrich and black heron feathers.
- The collar is worn around the neck, over the mantle and is secured with white ribbons tied in bows on the shoulders. Like the mantle, it was introduced in the 15th and 16th centuries. Made of pure gold, it weighs 30 troy ounces (0.933 kg). The collar is composed of gold heraldic knots alternating with enamelled medallions, each showing a rose encircled by the Garter. During the reign of Henry VII (1485–1509), commencing at the termination of the Wars of the Roses, each garter surrounded two roses – one red for the House of Lancaster and one white for the House of York – but he changed the design to encircle the Tudor rose alone, a combination of both forms. (Note: See for example the single roses on the collar of the effigy of Robert Willoughby, 1st Baron Willoughby de Broke, KG (died 1502) in Callington Church, Cornwall (see image File:RobertWilloughbyCallington.jpg).) Today one of the most visible representations of the collar forms part of the monarch's heraldic achievement on the gates of Buckingham Palace. (Note: See image File:Buckingham Palace - 02.jpg.)
- The Great George, which is worn suspended from the collar, is a colourfully enamelled (sometimes jewelled) three-dimensional figure of St George the Martyr on horseback slaying a dragon.

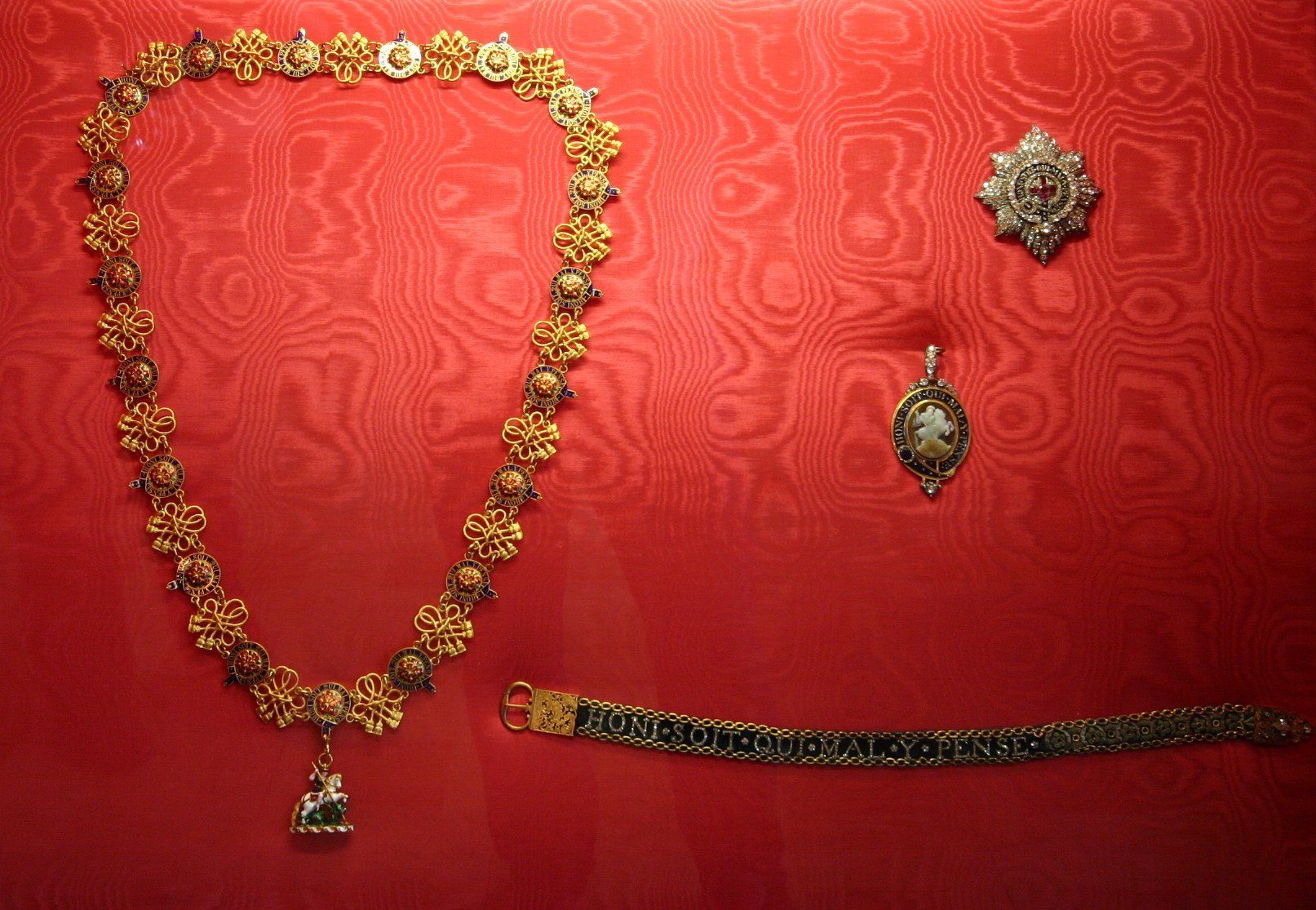
The insignia of a knight/lady companion of the Order of the Garter

- The Garter is worn on ceremonial occasions around the left calf (Note: The Garter is worn over and above the left strap of the dress breeches of men but nowadays it is anachronistically worn over the trousers because the wearing of court dress by most Garter knights has fallen into disuse.) by knights and around the left arm by ladies, and is depicted on several insignia. The Garter is a buckled dark-blue (originally light-blue) velvet strap, and bears the motto in gold letters. The garters of Stranger Knights and Ladies were once set with several jewels. Two styles have been used: one is a working garter where the end slips through the buckle, passed behind, and then is tucked down through the formed loop, as it is shown in the arms of the order, and the other style is a 'pre-made' one that has the buckled and tucked end pre-fashioned and is fastened with a clip attachment.

Up until the middle part of the 20th century, it was customary to wear Tudor style under-dress, consisting of white silk embroidered doublet, breeches, full hose, white doeskin pumps with satin bows and a sword belt with sword, under the robes. Nowadays, morning dress or a lounge suit is worn, except for coronations when Tudor under-dress is worn by the canopy-bearers.

==== Other occasions ====
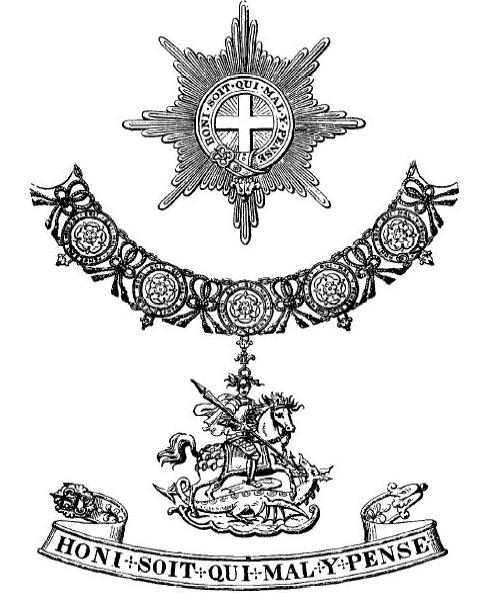
Top: A Garter "Star"; middle: A "Great George" (St George on horseback slaying the dragon) pendant from the Collar; bottom: the Garter

On other occasions when decorations are worn, the members wear simpler insignia:

- The collar is worn on designated collar days over military uniform or morning dress by members attending formal events. The collar is fastened to the shoulders with silk ribbons (or gold safety pins when worn with morning dress). Since the collar signifies the Order of the Garter, members can then wear the riband of any other order to which they belong.
- The star, which is worn pinned to the left breast, was introduced in the 17th century by King Charles I and is a colourfully enamelled depiction of the heraldic shield of St George's Cross, encircled by the Garter, which is itself encircled by an eight-point silver badge. Each point is depicted as a cluster of rays, with the four points of the cardinal directions longer than the intermediate ones. The stars of Stranger Knights and Ladies were once set with several jewels. Since the Order of the Garter is the senior order of the United Kingdom, a member will wear its star above the others (up to three) that they hold. There are examples in the Royal Collection of the stars of foreign orders given to George V surrounded with the Garter, e.g. the Prussian Order of the Black Eagle given to George V when Prince of Wales.
- The riband is a four-inch (10.16 cm)-wide sash worn over the left shoulder, or pinned beneath it, to the right hip, and was introduced in the 17th century by King Charles I. The riband's colour has varied over the years: it was originally light blue, but was a dark shade under the Hanoverian monarchs. In 1950, the colour was fixed as "kingfisher blue". A member will wear only one riband, even if they belong to several orders.
- The badge is worn suspended from a small gold link from the riband at the right hip, and is sometimes known as "the Lesser George". Like the Great George, the badge shows St George the Martyr on horseback slaying a dragon, but it is flatter and gold. In earlier times, the badge was worn from a ribbon tied around the neck.

On the death of a member, the Lesser George and breast star are returned personally to the sovereign by the former member's nearest male relative, and the other insignia to the Central Chancery of the Orders of Knighthood, save the riband, mantle and hat.

=== Officers ===
For ceremonial occasions of the Order, the officers wear the following garments and accessories:

- The mantles for the prelate and chancellor are dark blue like those of the members (as a member, the chancellor wears a member's mantle), but the mantles for the other officers are dark red. All mantles are embroidered with a heraldic shield of St George's Cross. For Garter ceremonies, Garter Principal King of Arms wears this red mantle rather than the tabard of the royal arms worn for other State ceremonial occasions.
- Officers wear badges of office suspended from a chain worn around the neck. The badge for the prelate shows the Lesser George encircled by the Garter, which is surmounted by a bishop's mitre. The badge for the chancellor is a rose encircled by the Garter. The badge for the register is two crossed quills over a book encircled by the Garter surmounted by a crown. The badge for Garter Principal King of Arms is the royal arms impaled with St George's Cross encircled by the Garter and surmounted by a crown. The badge for the usher is a knot (like those on the collars of the companions of the order) encircled by the Garter and surmounted by a crown. The badge for the secretary shows two crossed quills in front of a rose and encircled by the Garter surmounted by a crown.

The chancellor carries a purse, which is embroidered with the royal arms impaled by the Cross of St George. The purse contains the seal of the Order. Garter Principal King of Arms carries his baton of office. The usher carries their staff of office, the Black Rod.

== Chapel ==
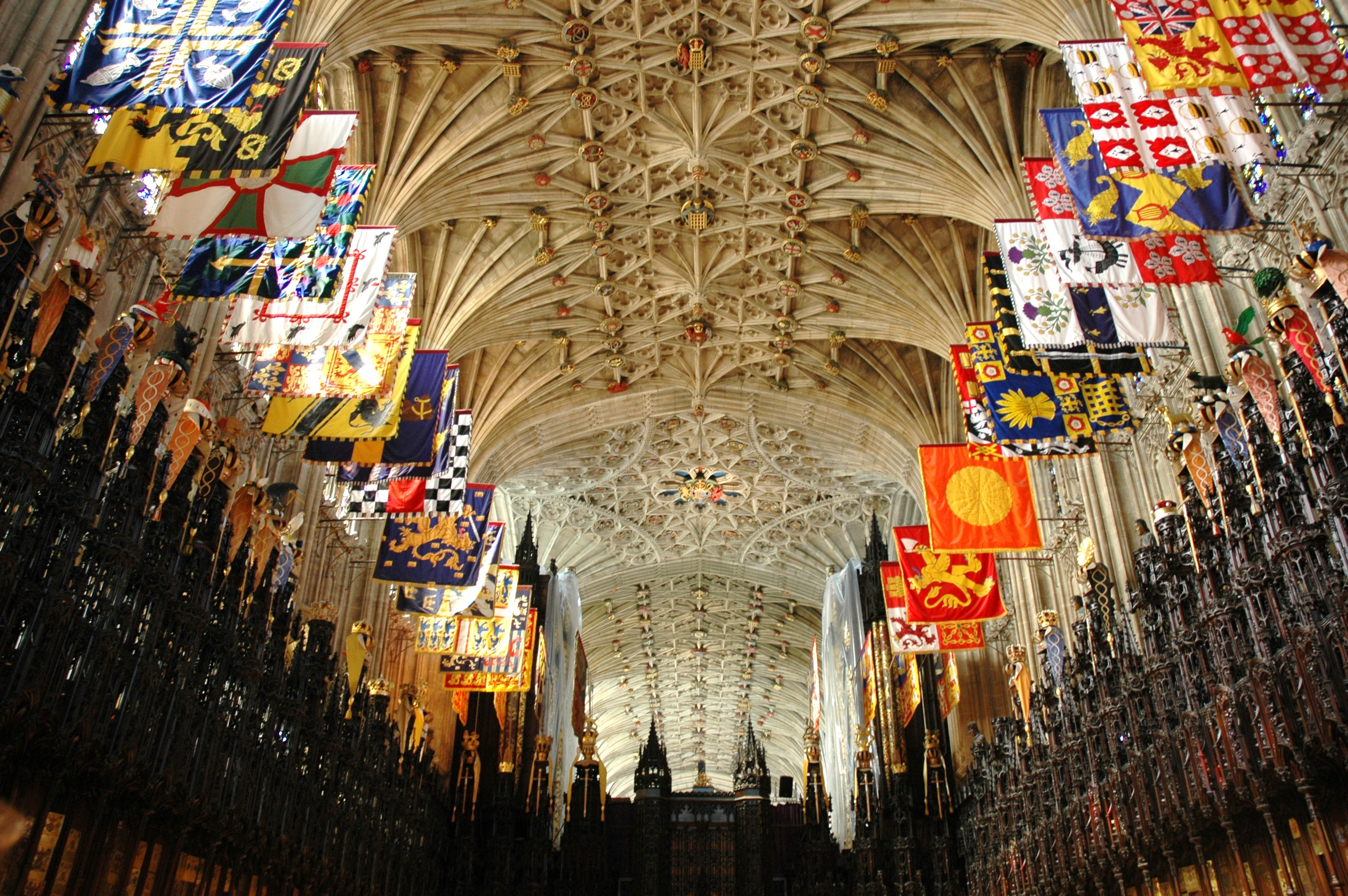
Banners in St George's Chapel of members of the Order of the Garter

St George's Chapel in Windsor is the mother church of the Order of the Garter and the location of special services in relation to the Order.

During their lifetime, all members of the Order of the Garter are entitled to display their heraldic crests and banners in St George's Chapel. While the Garter stall plates stay in the chapel permanently, the crests and banners of deceased knights are, following presentation at the High Altar, removed from the chapel. Sometimes they are then given to institutions that were connected with the late knight, or kept privately depending on family wishes. Originally after a knight's death, the crests became the property of Garter King of Arms, and these crests have been the subject of occasional exhibitions in the Earl Marshal's Court at the College of Arms.

Garter stall plates are small enamelled and engraved brass plates located in St George's Chapel as memorials to Knights of the Garter.

== Investiture and installation ==
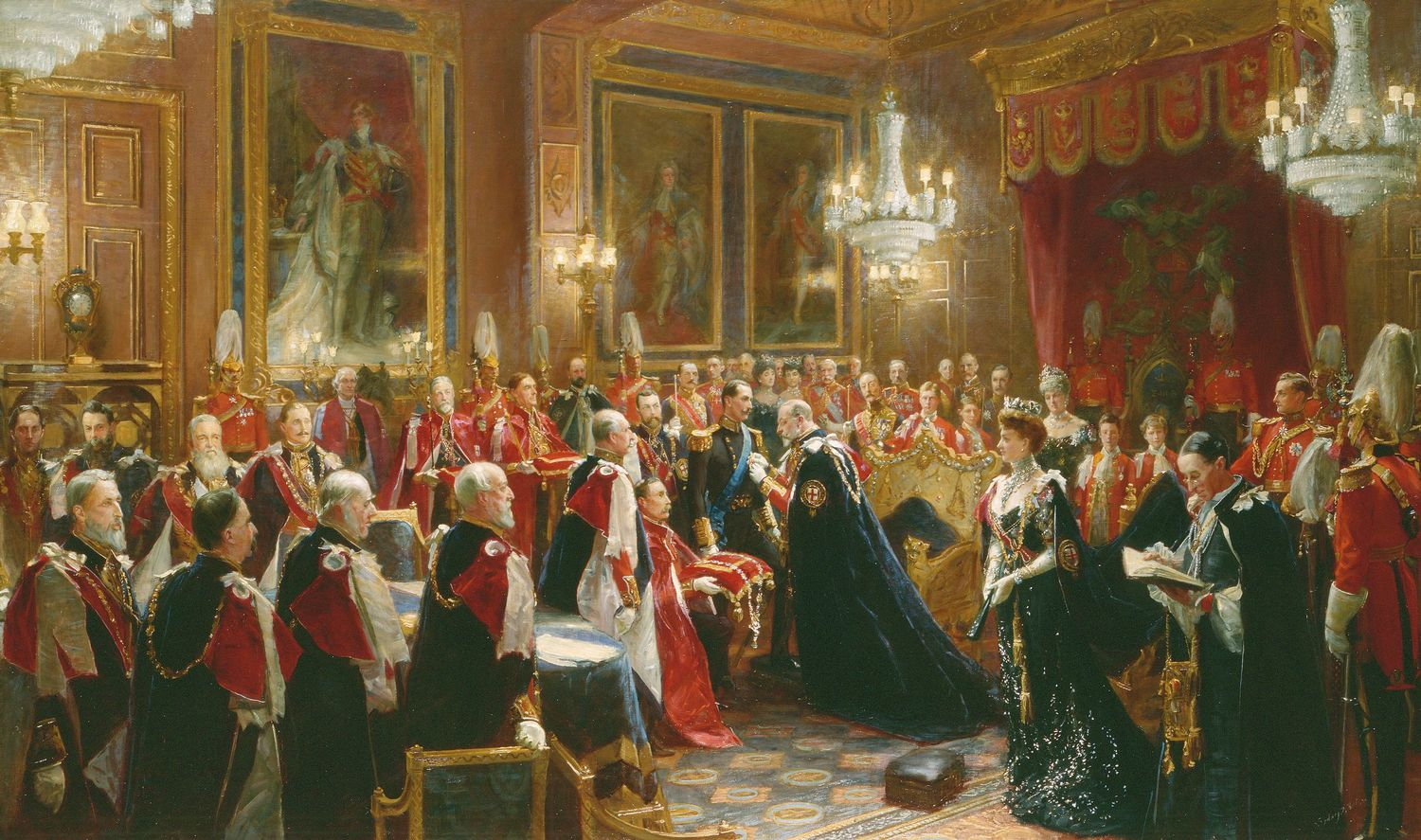
Edward VII invests Haakon VII of Norway with the insignia of the Order of the Garter in the Throne Room of Windsor Castle, 9 November 1906. Painting by Sydney Prior Hall.

Each June, on Garter Day, the members of the Order, wearing their habits and garter insignia, meet at Windsor Castle. When any new Knights and/or Ladies of the Garter are due for installation, an investiture ceremony is held in the Throne Room of Windsor Castle on the morning of Garter Day. This ceremony is attended by all available Knights and Ladies Companion of the Order, wearing the ceremonial habits and garter insignia, and also by their spouses. The wording of the oath sworn by the new knights at this ceremony and of the Admonitions addressed to them in turn by the prelate and chancellor of the order when the several items of insignia are placed upon them are extremely similar to the traditions of the past.

At the investiture ceremony, two senior knights or ladies of the order assist the Sovereign by placing the garter around the left leg of the new knight, or left arm of the new lady, and in the fastening of the riband and Lesser George about the body of the new knight or lady, and in the adjustment of the mantle and the collar. After the investiture ceremony at Windsor is concluded, a state luncheon is held in the Banqueting Room. This is attended by the royal family, by all the Companions of the Order and their spouses, and by the Officers of the Order. After the banquet all the knights and ladies of the order, together with the prelate, chancellor and other officers of the order, in their mantles and ceremonial robes, led by the Military Knights of Windsor, move in procession, watched by a great crowd of spectators, through the castle, down the hill, which is lined with soldiers, to Saint George's Chapel for a worship service, before which the formal installation of the new knights takes place.

While (then just) knights continued to be invested with their ensigns, the formal installation of knights at St George's Chapel ceased in 1805. Installation, along with the annual Garter service, returned in 1948; on the occasion of the order's 600th anniversary.

== Privileges ==
=== Precedence ===
Members of the order may encircle their heraldic arms with the Garter.

The collar of the order as it appears on some heraldic arms.

Members are assigned positions in the order of precedence, coming before all others of knightly rank, and above baronets. The wives, sons, daughters and daughters-in-law of Knights Companion are also assigned precedence. Relatives of Ladies Companion are not, however, assigned any special positions. (Generally, individuals can derive precedence from their fathers or husbands, but not from their wives.) The Chancellor is also assigned precedence, but since 1837 the office has been held by a diocesan bishop of the Church of England or a peer, which have a higher precedence than that bestowed by the Chancellorship.

Knights Companion prefix "Sir" and Ladies Companion prefix "Lady" to their forenames. Wives of Knights Companion may prefix "Lady" to their surnames, but no corresponding privilege exists for husbands of Ladies Companion. Such forms are not used by royalty, peers, peeresses, or Anglican clergymen, who instead use only the post-nominal letters.

Knights and Ladies Companion use the post-nominal letters "KG" and "LG" respectively. When an individual is entitled to use multiple post-nominal letters, those of the Order of the Garter appear before all others, except "Bt" or "Bart" (Baronet), "VC" (Victoria Cross) and "GC" (George Cross).

=== Heraldry ===
In their heraldic achievements, members of the Order of the Garter may encircle their escutcheon with the Garter. Knights and Ladies Companion are also entitled to receive heraldic supporters, a privilege granted to few other private individuals. While some families claim supporters by ancient use, and others have been granted them as a special reward, only members of the Royal Family, peers, Knights and Ladies Companion of the Garter, Knights and Ladies of the Thistle, and Knights and Dames Grand Cross of the junior orders of chivalry are automatically entitled to them.

== Gallery ==
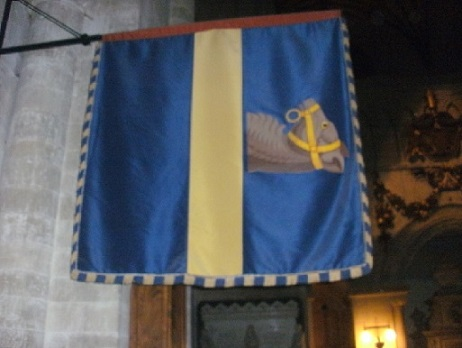
Garter banner of Alexander Baring, 6th Baron Ashburton, now in Winchester Cathedral

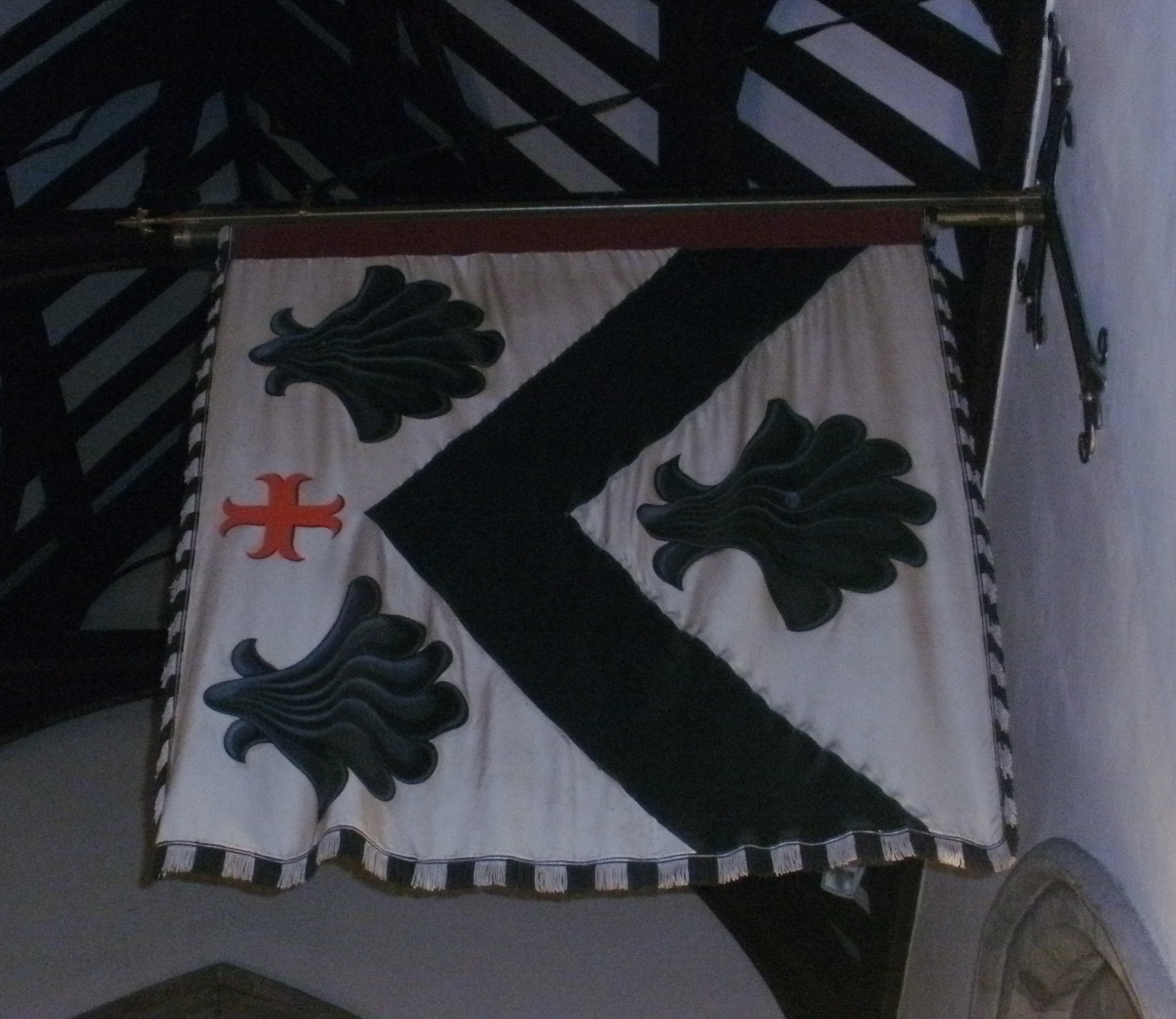
Garter banner of Oliver Lyttelton, 1st Viscount Chandos, now in St John the Baptist Church, Hagley

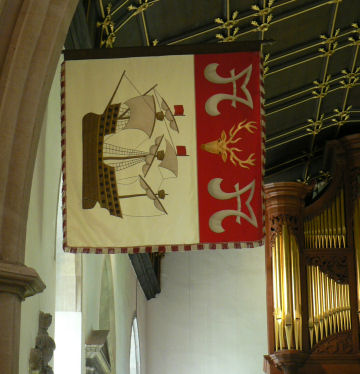
Garter banner of Lord Wilson of Rievaulx, now at Jesus College Chapel, Oxford

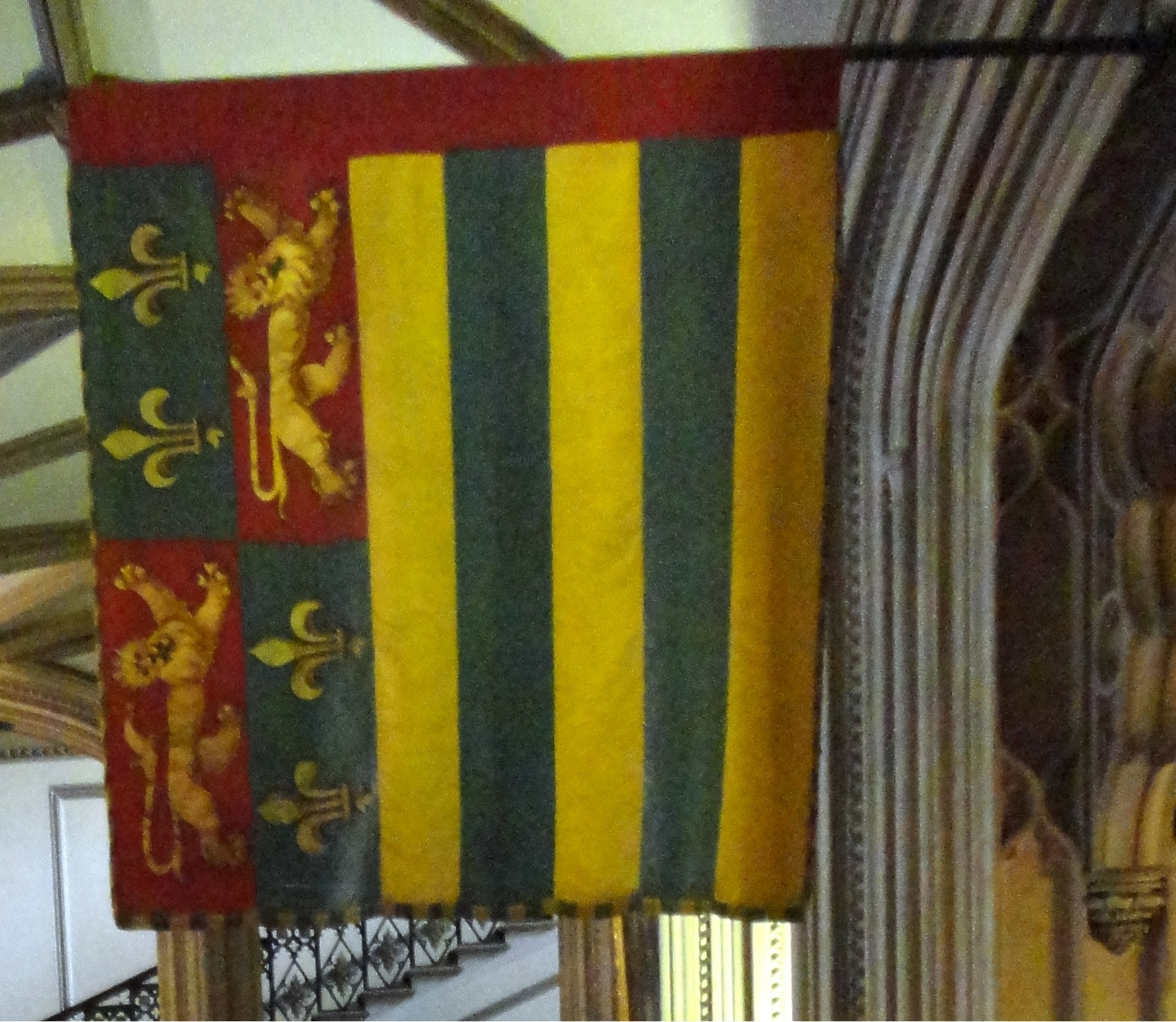
Garter banner of Henry Manners, 8th Duke of Rutland, now at Belvoir Castle

Arms of Philip, Prince of Asturias at his investiture, encircled by the Garter (in 1554)

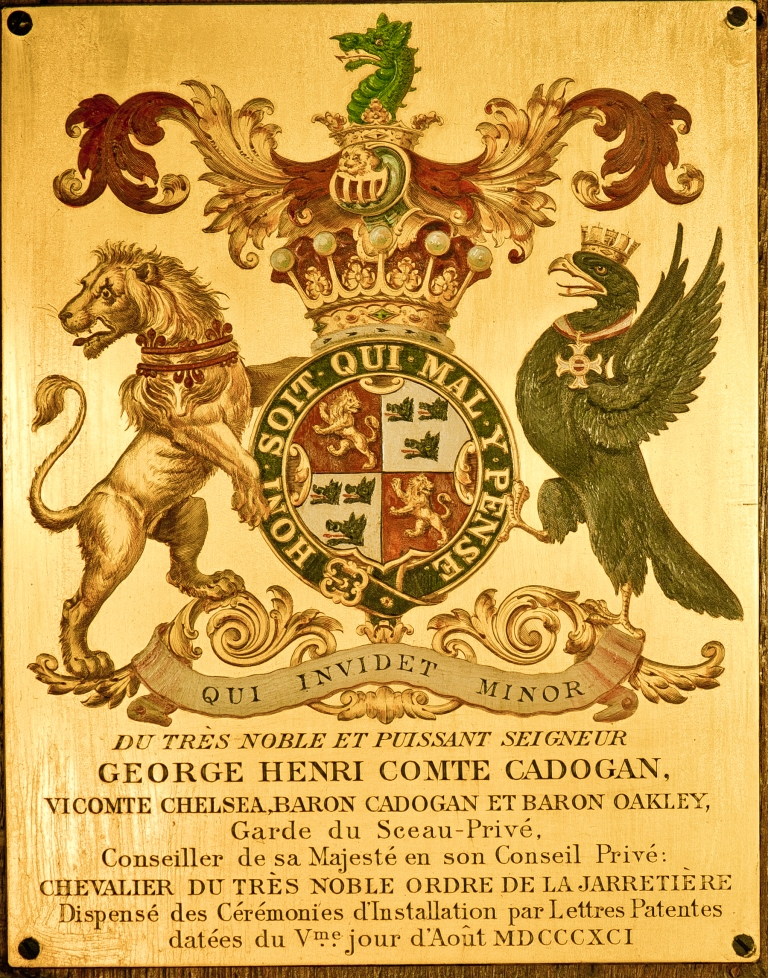
Garter stall plate of George Cadogan, 5th Earl Cadogan

Arms of Margaret Thatcher, Baroness Thatcher

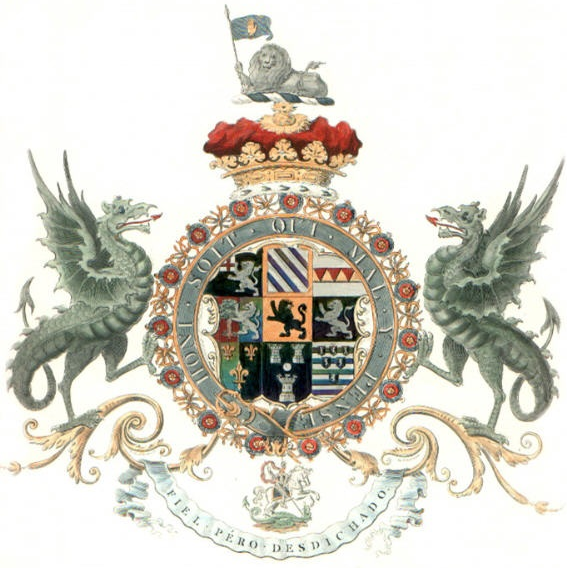
The arms of John Churchill, 1st Duke of Marlborough, are encircled by both the Garter and the collar.

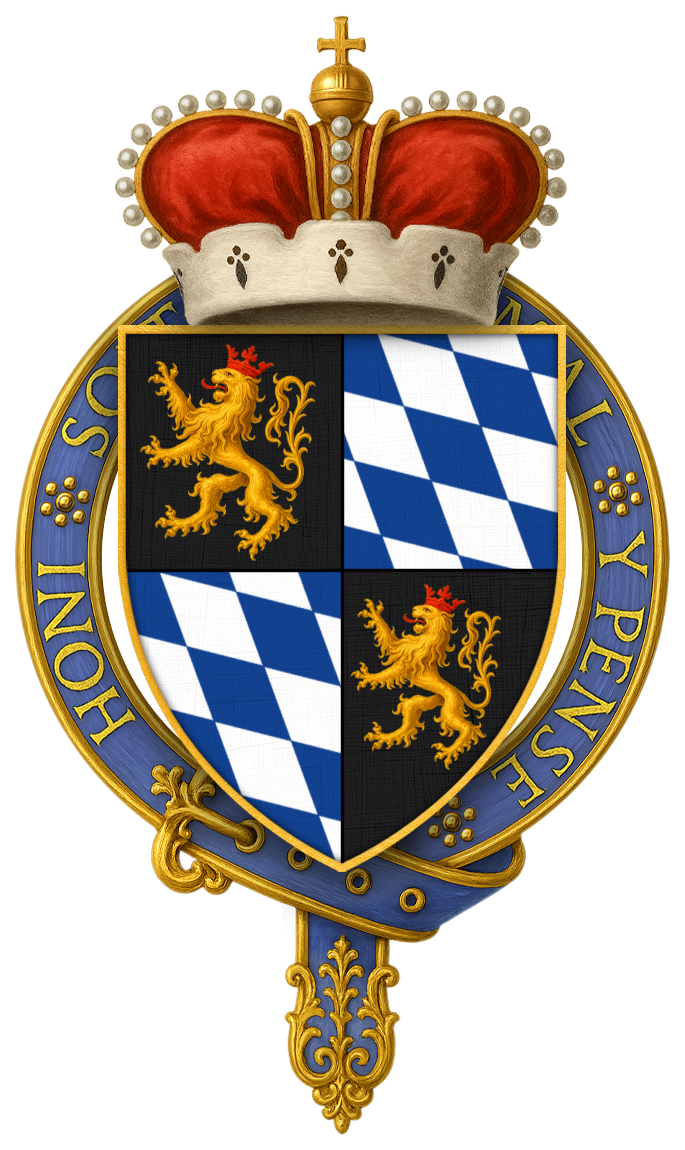
The arms of John Casimir of the Palatinate-Simmern, encircled by the Garter

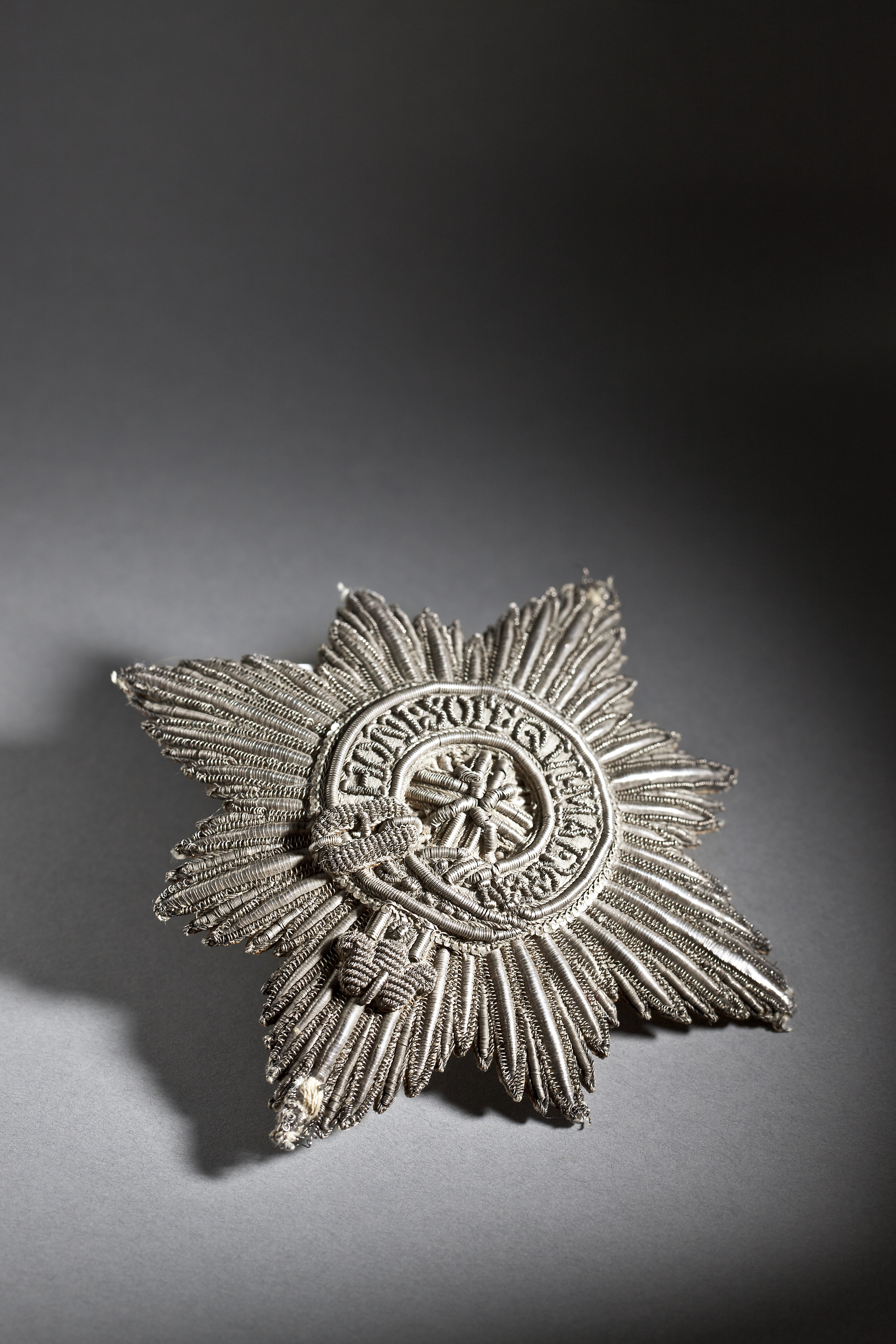
The Garter "Star" worn by King Charles XI of Sweden, late 17th century

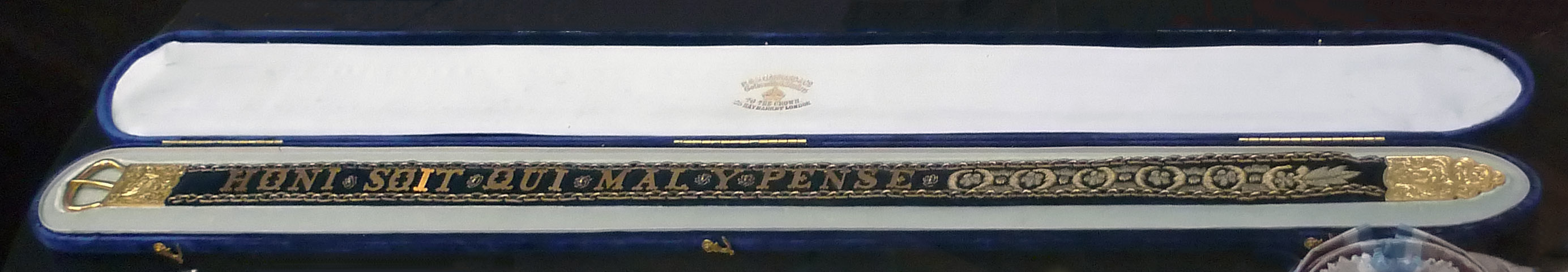
The garter of Emperor Franz Joseph I of Austria

=== Armorial ===
The Order
Arms of the Order	Variant with the royal arms and Tudor Crown

== See also ==
- List of current knights and ladies of the Garter
- List of knights and ladies of the Garter
- The Society of the Friends of St George's and Descendants of the Knights of the Garter

== Sources ==
- Ashmole, Elias (1672). Institution, Laws and Ceremonies of the Most Noble Order of the Garter. London.
- Begent, P.J.; Chesshyre, H. (1999). The Most Noble Order of the Garter: 650 Years. London: Spink and Son. ISBN 1902040201.
- Beltz, George Frederick (1841). Memorials of the Order of the Garter. London: William Pickering.
- Chisholm, Hugh, ed. (1911). "Knighthood and Chivalry" . Encyclopædia Britannica. Vol. 15 (11th ed.). Cambridge University Press. pp. 851–867.
- Fellowes, Edmund (1939). The Knights of the Garter, 1348–1939: With a Complete List of the Stall Plates in St. George's Chapel. Historical monographs relating to St. George's Chapel, Windsor Castle. Vol. 1. SPCK.
- Rogers, Clifford J. (2018). "The symbolic meaning of Edward III's Garter badge". In Baker, Gary P.; Lambert, Craig L.; Simpkin, David (eds.). Military Communities in Late Medieval England: essays in honour of Andrew Ayton. Woodbridge: Boydell. pp. 125–145. ISBN 9781783272983.
