= List of knights and ladies of the Garter =

The Most Noble Order of the Garter was founded by Edward III, King of England in 1348. Dates shown are of nomination or installation; coloured rows indicate sovereigns, princes of Wales, medieval royal knights and ladies, modern royal knights and ladies, and stranger knights and ladies, none of whom counts toward the 24-member limit.

Founders · Edward III · Richard II
Henry IV · Henry V · Henry VI (1st) · Edward IV (1st)
Henry VI (2nd) · Edward IV (2nd) · Edward V · Richard III
Henry VII · Henry VIII · Edward VI · Mary I · Elizabeth I
James I · Charles I · Charles II · James II · William III & Mary II · William III · Anne
George I · George II · George III (The Regency) · George IV · William IV · Victoria
Edward VII · George V · Edward VIII · George VI · Elizabeth II · Charles III
See also · References · External links

== Knights founder ==
Knights founder
N°	Name	Image	Arms	Life	Date	Notes
S1	King Edward III			1312–1377	1348	Sovereign of the order upon establishing it.
1	Edward, Prince of Wales			1330–1376	23 April 1348	
2	Henry of Grosmont, Earl of Lancaster			c. 1310–1361	1348	Later Duke of Lancaster
3	Thomas Beauchamp, 11th Earl of Warwick			d. 1369	1348	
4	Jean III de Grailly, Captal de Buch			d. 1376	1348	
5	Ralph Stafford, 2nd Baron Stafford			1301–1372	1348	Later Earl of Stafford
6	William Montagu, 2nd Earl of Salisbury			1328–1397	1348	
7	Roger Mortimer, 2nd Earl of March			1328–1360	1348	
8	John Lisle, 2nd Baron Lisle of Rougemont			1318–1356	1348	
9	Bartholomew Burghersh			d. 1369	1348	Later Baron Burghersh
10	John Beauchamp			d. 1360	1348	Later Baron Beauchamp
11	John Mohun, 2nd Baron Mohun			c. 1320–1376	1348	
12	Hugh Courtenay			1327–1349	1348	
13	Thomas Holland			c. 1315–1360	1348	Later Earl of Kent
14	John de Grey			c. 1300–1359	1348	
15	Richard Fitz-Simon			b.1295	1348	
16	Miles Stapleton			d. 1364	1348	
17	Thomas Wale			d. 1352	1348	
18	Hugh Wrottesley			d. 1381	1348	
19	Neil Loring			d. 1386	1348	
20	John Chandos			d. 1369	1348	
21	James Audley			d. 1369	1348	
22	Otho Holand			d. 1359	1348	
23	Henry Eam			?	1348	
24	Sanchet D'Abrichecourt			d. c. 1360	1348	
25	Walter Paveley			d. 1375	1348	

== Edward III ==
Edward III (1349–1377)
N°	Name	Image	Arms	Life	Date	Notes
26	William FitzWarin			d. 1361	c. 1349	
27	Robert Ufford, 1st Earl of Suffolk			1298–1369	c. 1349	
28	William de Bohun, 1st Earl of Northampton			c. 1310–1360	1349	
29	Reynold Cobham, 1st Baron Cobham of Sterborough			c. 1295–1361	1353	
30	Richard de la Vache			d. 1366	1355	
F1	Queen Philippa			d. 1369	1358	Consort of Edward III
31	Thomas Ughtred, 1st Baron Ughtred			1292–1365	1360	
32	Walter de Manny, 1st Baron Manny			d. 1372	1360	
33	Frank van Hallen			d. 1375	1360	
34	Thomas Ufford			?	1360	
35	Lionel of Antwerp, 1st Earl of Ulster			1338–1368	c. 1361	Later Duke of Clarence
36	John of Gaunt			1340–1399	c. 1361	Later Duke of Lancaster
37	Edmund of Langley			1341–1402	c. 1361	Later Duke of York
38	Edward Despenser, 1st Baron Despenser			1336–1375	c. 1361	
39	John Sully			d. 1388	c. 1362	
40	William Latimer, 4th Baron Latimer			c. 1329–1381	1362	
41	Humphrey de Bohun, 7th Earl of Hereford			1341–1373	1365	
42	Enguerrand VII de Coucy			c. 1340–1397	1366	Later Earl of Bedford. Resigned the Order in 1377.
43	Henry Percy			1341–1408	c. 1366	Later Earl of Northumberland
44	Ralph Basset, 4th Baron Drayton			1335–1390	1368–1369	
45	Richard Pembridge			d. 1375	c. 1369	
46	John Neville, 3rd Baron Neville			1337–1388	1369	
47	Robert de Namur			d. 1392	1370	
48	John Hastings, 2nd Earl of Pembroke			1347–1375	1370	
49	Thomas de Grandison			d. 1375–1376	1370	
50	Guy de Bryan, 1st Baron Bryan			d. 1390	c. 1370	
51	Guichard d'Angle, Earl of Huntingdon			d. 1380	1372	
52	Alan Buxhull			d. 1381	1372–1373	
53	Thomas Beauchamp, 12th Earl of Warwick			d. 1401	1373	Degraded 1397; Restored 1400.
54	John IV, Duke of Brittany			c. 1339–1399	1375–1376	
55	Thomas Banastre			d. 1379	1375–1376	
56	William Ufford, 2nd Earl of Suffolk			d. 1382	1375–1376	
57	Hugh Stafford, 2nd Earl of Stafford			c. 1342–1386	1375–1376	
58	Thomas Holland, 2nd Earl of Kent			1350–1397	1375–1376	
59	Thomas Percy			1343–1403	1375–1376	Later Earl of Worcester
60	William Beauchamp			d. 1411	1376	Later Baron Bergavenny
F2	Isabella, Countess of Bedford			d. 1379	1376	Daughter of Edward III, consort of Enguerrand VII.
61	Richard, Prince of Wales			1367–1400	1377	Later Richard II, King of England
62	Henry Bolingbroke, 3rd Earl of Derby			1367–1413	1377	Later Henry IV, King of England

== Richard II ==
Richard II (1377–1399)
N°	Name	Image	Arms	Life	Date	Notes
S2	King Richard II			1367–1400	1377	Became sovereign of the order upon accession to the throne. Previously a ex officio member as Prince of Wales.
63	John Burley			d. 1383	1377	
64	Lewis Clifford			d. 1404	1377	
F3	Joan, Dowager Princess of Wales			d. 1385	1378	Wife of Edward the Black Prince. Mother of King Richard II.
F4	Infanta Constance, Duchess of Lancaster			d. 1394	1378	Wife of John of Gaunt
F5	Mary, Duchess of Brittany			d. 1361	1378	Posthumous honour
F6	Maud, Lady Courtenay				1378	
F7	Philippa of Lancaster			d. 1415	1378	Later Queen of Portugal
F8	Elizabeth of Lancaster			d. 1426	1378	Later Duchess of Exeter
F9	Philippa, Countess of Oxford			d. 1411	1378	
F10	Infanta Isabella, Countess of Cambridge			d. 1392	1378	Later Duchess of York
65	Bermond Arnaud de Preissac			d. c.1385	1380	
66	Thomas of Woodstock, Earl of Buckingham			1355–1397	1380–1381	Later Duke of Gloucester
67	Thomas Felton			d. 1381	1381	
68	John Holland			c. 1352–1400	1381	Later Duke of Exeter
69	Simon Burley			1336–1388	1381	
70	Bryan Stapleton			d. 1394	1382	
71	Richard Burley			d. 1387	1382	
72	Thomas Mowbray, 1st Earl of Nottingham			c. 1368–1399	1383	Later Duke of Norfolk
F11	Queen Anne			d. 1394	1384	
F12	Eleanor, Countess of Buckingham			d. 1399	1384	Later Duchess of Gloucester
F13	Anne Hastings, Countess of Pembroke			d. 1384	1384	
F14	Elizabeth, Countess of Salisbury				1384	
F15	Catherine of Lancaster			d. 1418	1384	Later Queen of Castile and León
F16	Joan, Lady Mohun				1384	
73	Robert de Vere, 9th Earl of Oxford			1362–1392	1385	Later Duke of Ireland; Degraded 1388.
F17	Maud, Dowager Countess of Oxford			1345/1346 – 1413	1386	
F18	Elizabeth de Mowbray, Countess of Nottingham			1366–1425	1386	Later Duchess of Norfolk
F19	Constance of York			c. 1375 – 1416	1386	Later Countess of Gloucester
F20	Elizabeth Courtenay			d. 1395	1386	Later Lady de Vere
F21	Blanche, Lady Poynings			d. 1409	1386	
74	Richard Fitzalan, 4th Earl of Arundel			c. 1346–1397	1387	
75	Nicholas Sarnesfeld			d. c.1395	1386–1387	
76	Edward of York			1373–1415	1387	Later Duke of York
F22	The Lady Gomeneys				1387	Married John de Geaux, Sire de Gomeneys.
F23	Katherine Swynford			c. 1350 – 1403	1387	Later Duchess of Lancaster
F24	Alice Holland, Countess of Kent			c. 1350 – 1416	1388	
F25	Mary, Countess of Derby and Northampton			c. 1369/70 – 1394	1388	Mother of King Henry V.
77	Henry 'Hotspur' Percy			1364–1403	1388	Nicknamed Hotspur for his speed on the battlefield
78	John Devereux, 1st Baron Devereux			d. 1393	1388–1389	
79	Peter Courtenay			d. 1405	1388–1389	
80	Thomas Despenser, 2nd Baron Despenser			1373–1400	c. 1388	Later Earl of Gloucester
F26	Lady Elizabeth Trivet				1390	Daughter of Sir Philip Timbury. Married 1st Thomas Swinbourne; 2nd Sir Thomas Trivet, who died 1388.
F27	Lady Joan FitzAlan			1375–1435	1390	Daughter of Richard Fitzalan, 4th Earl of Arundel, married Sir William Beauchamp, later Baroness Bergavenny.
F28	Joan, Lady Fitzwalter				1390	Daughter of John, Lord Devereux, K.G. Married 1st Sir Walter Fitzwalter, afterwards Lord Fitzwalter; 2ndly as his third wife, Hugh, 2nd Lord Burnell, K.G.
81	William I, Duke of Guelders and Jülich			d. 1402	c.1399	
82	William VI, Count of Holland			1365–1417	c.1399	
83	John Bourchier, 2nd Baron Bourchier			d. 1400	c.1399	
84	John Beaumont, 4th Baron Beaumont			1361–1396	c.1393–1396	
85	William Scrope			c. 1350–1399	c. 1395	Later Earl of Wiltshire
86	William Arundel			d. 1400	c. 1395	
87	John Beaufort, 1st Earl of Somerset			c. 1373–1410	c. 1397	
F29	Queen Isabella			1389–1409	1397	
88	Thomas Holland, 3rd Earl of Kent			1374–1400	1397–1399	Later Duke of Surrey
89	John Montagu, 3rd Earl of Salisbury			c. 1350–1400	1397–1399	
90	Albert I, Duke of Bavaria			1336–1404	c. 1398	
91	Simon Felbrigge			d. 1442	c. 1398	
92	Philip de la Vache			1348–c.1408	c. 1399	
F30	Katherine, Duchess of Gueldres			1361–1400	1399	
F31	Joan, Duchess of York			1380–1434	1399	
F32	Margaret, Marchioness of Dorset			1385–1439	1399	Later Duchess of Clarence
F33	Joan, Countess of Westmorland			1379–1440	1399	
F34	Blanch Bradeston				1399	
F35	Agnes Arundel				1399	Wife of Sir William Arundel
F36	Margaret, Lady Roe of Hamlake				1399	
F37	Margaret, Lady de Courcy				1399	

== Henry IV ==
Henry IV (1399–1413)
N°	Name	Image	Arms	Life	Date	Notes
S3	King Henry IV			1367–1413	1399	Became sovereign of the order upon accession to the throne. Previously a knight companion of the order.
93	Henry, Prince of Wales			1386–1422	1399	Later Henry V, King of England
94	Thomas of Lancaster			1387–1421	c. 1400	Later Duke of Clarence
95	John of Lancaster			1389–1435	c. 1400	Later Duke of Bedford
96	Humphrey of Lancaster			1390–1447	c. 1400	Later Duke of Gloucester
97	Thomas Fitzalan, 5th Earl of Arundel			1381–1415	1400	
98	Thomas Beaufort			c. 1377–1426	1400	Later Duke of Exeter
99	Richard Beauchamp, 13th Earl of Warwick			1382–1439	1400	
100	William Willoughby, 5th Baron Willoughby			c. 1370–1409	c. 1401	
101	Thomas Rempston			d. 1406	c. 1401	
102	John I, King of Portugal			1357–1433	c. 1408	
103	Thomas Erpingham			c. 1355–1428	c. 1401	
104	Edmund Stafford, 5th Earl of Stafford			1378–1403	c.1402	
105	Ralph Neville, 4th Baron Neville			c. 1364–1425	c.1403	Later Earl of Westmorland
106	Edmund Holland, 4th Earl of Kent			1384–1408	c.1404	
107	Richard Grey, 4th Baron Grey of Codnor			c. 1371–1418	c.1404	
108	William Ros, 6th Baron Ros			1369–1414	c.1404	
109	John Stanley			d. 1414	c.1405	
110	Eric, King of Denmark, Sweden and Norway			1382–1459	c.1405	
111	John Lovel, 5th Baron Lovel			1341–1408	c.1405	
112	Hugh Burnell, 2nd Baron Burnell			1347–1420	c.1407	
113	Edward Charlton, 5th Baron Charlton			1370–1421	c.1407	
114	Gilbert Talbot, 5th Baron Talbot			c. 1383–1419	1408–1409	
F38	Queen Joan			1368–1437	1408	Regent of England (1415)
F39	Philippa, Queen of Denmark			1394–1430	1408	Also Queen of Sweden and Queen of Norway
F40	Margaret, Duchess of Bavaria			1374–1441	1408	
F41	Blanche, Electress Palatine			1392–1409	1408	
F42	Philippa, Duchess of York			1367–1431	1408	
F43	Maud, Countess of Salisbury			1370–1424	1408	
F44	Margaret, Lady Waterton				1408	
F45	Margaret, Lady Beaufort				1408	Daughter of Sir Thomas Neville
F46	Agnes de Gomeneys			Wife of William de Gomeneys	1408	
115	Henry FitzHugh, 3rd Baron FitzHugh			1363–1425	c.1409	
116	Robert de Umfraville			c. 1363–1437	1409–1413	
117	John Cornwall			c. 1364–1443	c.1409	
118	Henry Scrope, 3rd Baron Scrope of Masham			c. 1373–1415	1410	
119	Thomas Morley, 4th Baron Morley			c. 1354–1416	c. 1411	
F47	Beatrice, Countess of Arundel			c. 1382–1439	1413	

== Henry V ==
Henry V (1413–1422)
N°	Name	Image	Arms	Life	Date	Notes
S4	King Henry V			1386–1422	1413	Became sovereign of the order upon accession to the throne. Previously an ex officio member as Prince of Wales.
120	John d'Abrichecourt			d. 1415	1413	
121	Thomas Montagu, 4th Earl of Salisbury			1388–1428	c.1414	
122	Thomas Camoys, 1st Baron Camoys			c. 1351–1419	c.1415	
F48	Catherine of Valois			1401–1437	1415	Later Queen of England
123	William Haryngton			d. 1440	c.1416	
124	William la Zouche, 5th Baron Zouche			c. 1373–1415	c.1415	
125	John Holland, 2nd Earl of Huntingdon			1395–1447	c.1416	Later Duke of Exeter
126	Richard de Vere, 11th Earl of Oxford			1385–1417	c.1416	
127	Sigismund, King of Germany			1368–1437	1416	Holy Roman Emperor from 1433
128	Robert Willoughby, 6th Baron Willoughby			1385–1452	c.1417	
129	John Blount			d. c.1418	c. 1417	
130	John Robessart			d. 1450	c.1418	
131	Hugh Stafford, 1st Baron Stafford			d. 1420	c.1418	Sometimes called Lord Bourchier
132	William Phelip			1383–1441	c. 1418	Later Baron Bardolph
133	John Grey, 1st Earl of Tankerville			d. 1421	c.1418	
134	Walter Hungerford			1378–1449	1421	Later Baron Hungerford
135	Lewis Robessart			d. 1431	1421	
136	Hertong von Clux			d. 1445	1421	
137	John Clifford, 7th Baron Clifford			c. 1389–1422	1421	
138	John Mowbray, 5th Earl of Norfolk			1392–1432	1421	Later Duke of Norfolk
139	William de la Pole, 4th Earl of Suffolk			1396–1450	1421	Later Duke of Suffolk
140	Philip III, Duke of Burgundy			1396–1467	25 April 1422	Nominated, but Declined

== Henry VI ==
Henry VI (1422–1461)
N°	Name	Image	Arms	Life	Date	Notes
S5	King Henry VI			1421–1471	1422	Became sovereign of the order upon accession to the throne.
141	John Talbot, 7th Baron Talbot			c. 1387–1453	6 May 1424 (elected)	Later Earl of Shrewsbury
142	Thomas Scales, 7th Baron Scales			1399–1460	22 April 1425 (elected)	
143	John Fastolf			1380–1459	22 April 1426 (elected)	
144	Peter, Duke of Coimbra			1392–1449	22 April 1427 (elected); 22 April 1428 (inst. by proxy)	
145	Humphrey Stafford, 6th Earl of Stafford			1402–1460	22 April 1429 (elected)	Later Duke of Buckingham
146	John Radcliffe			d. 1441	22 April 1429 (elected)	
147	John Fitzalan, 4th Baron Arundel			1408–1435	22 April 1432 (elected)	
F49	Isabel de Beauchamp, Countess of Warwick			1400–1439	1432	
F50	Alice de la Pole, Countess of Suffolk			c. 1404 – 1475	1432	Later Duchess of Suffolk
148	Richard of York, 3rd Duke of York			1411–1460	22 April 1433 (elected)	
149	Edward, King of Portugal			1391–1438	8 May 1435 (elected)	
150	Edmund Beaufort			c. 1406–1455	5 May 1436 (elected)	Later Duke of Somerset
151	Sir John Grey			d. 1439	1436 (elected)	
F51	Eleanor, Duchess of Gloucester			c.1400 – 1452	1436	
F52	Jacquetta, Duchess of Bedford			c. 1415/16 – 1472	1436	Later Countess of Rivers
152	Richard Neville, 5th Earl of Salisbury			c. 1398–1460	1438 (elected)	
153	Albert V, Duke of Austria			1397–1439	22 April 1438 (elected)	Not installed; Later Albert II, Holy Roman Emperor
154	Gaston de Foix, Captal de Buch			d. after 1455	1438–1439	
155	William Neville, 6th Baron Fauconberg			c. 1405–1463	1440	Later Earl of Kent
156	John Beaufort, 3rd Earl of Somerset			1404–1444	1440	Later Duke of Somerset
157	Ralph Boteler, 1st Baron Sudeley			c. 1394–1473	c.1440	
158	John Beaumont, 1st Viscount Beaumont			1409–1460	1441–1442	
159	John Beauchamp			d. 1475	16 August 1445 (installed)	Baron Beauchamp of Powick
160	Henry, Duke of Viseu			d. 1460	1442–1443	a.k.a. Prince Henry the Navigator
161	Thomas Hoo			1394–1455	11 July 1445 (elected); 16 August (installed)	Later Baron Hoo and Hastings
162	Álvaro Vaz de Almada, 1st Count of Avranches			d. 1449	11 July 1445 (elected); 16 August (installed)	
163	John de Foix, Captal de Buch			d. 1485	12 May 1446 (elected)	Resigned c. 1462
164	Afonso V, King of Portugal			1432–1481	22 April 1447 (elected)	
165	François Surrienne, Sire de Lunée			c. 1398–1462	27 November 1447 (elected); 8 December (installed)	Resigned c. 1450
F53	Queen Margaret			1430–1482	1448	
F54	Lady Anne Moleyns				1448	Daughter of Sir John Whalesburgh. Married Sir William Moleyns.
F55	Emmeline, Baroness Saye and Sele				1448	Daughter of Sir William Cromer
F56	Margaret Beauchamp, Baroness Beauchamp of Powick			d. 1487	1448	Wife of John Beauchamp, 1st Baron Beauchamp, K.G.
F57	Lady Alice Norreys			c. 1405 – c. 1450	1448	Wife of Sir John Norreys
166	Alfonso V, King of Aragon, Sicily and Naples			1396–1458	4 August 1450 (elected)	
167	William, Duke of Brunswick			d. 1482	4 August 1450 (elected)	Not Installed
168	Casimir IV, King of Poland			1427–1492	4 August 1450 (elected)	Not Installed
169	Richard Woodville, 1st Baron Rivers			c. 1405–1469	4 August 1450	Later Earl Rivers
170	John Mowbray, 3rd Duke of Norfolk			1415–1461	28 May 1451 (elected); 22 April 1452 (inst. by proxy)	
171	Henry Bourchier, 5th Baron Bourchier			c. 1406–1483	22 April 1452 (installed)	Later Earl of Essex
172	Edward Hull			c. 1410–1453	7 May 1453 (elected)	Not Installed; died at Battle of Castillon
173	John Talbot, 2nd Earl of Shrewsbury			1413–1460	bef. 13 May 1457 (elected); 14 May (installed)	
174	Thomas Stanley, 1st Baron Stanley			c. 1405–1459	bef. 13 May 1457 (elected); 14 May (installed)	
175	Lionel Welles, 6th Baron Welles			1406–1461	bef. 13 May 1457 (elected); 14 May (installed)	
176	Frederick III, Holy Roman Emperor			1415–1493	14 May 1457 (elected)	Not Installed
177	James Butler, 5th Earl of Ormond			1420–1461	bef. 23 April 1459 (elected)	
178	John Sutton, 1st Baron Dudley			1400–1487	bef. 23 April 1459 (elected)	
179	John Bourchier, 1st Baron Berners			d. 1474	bef. 23 April 1459 (elected)	
180	Jasper Tudor, 1st Earl of Pembroke			1431–1495	bef. 23 April 1459 (elected)	Later Duke of Bedford; Degraded 1461; Restored 1485.
181	Richard Neville, 16th Earl of Warwick			1428–1471	8 February 1461	
182	William Bonville, 1st Baron Bonville de Chuton			1392–1461	8 February 1461	
183	Thomas Kiriell			1396–1461	8 February 1461	
184	John Wenlock			c.1404–1471	8 February 1461	Later Baron Wenlock

== Edward IV (first reign) ==
Edward IV (1461–1470)
N°	Name	Image	Arms	Life	Date	Notes
S6	King Edward IV			1442–1483	1461	Became sovereign of the order upon accession to the throne.
185	George Plantagenet, 1st Duke of Clarence			1449–1478	1461	
186	William Chamberlaine			d. 1462	1461	
187	John Tiptoft, 1st Earl of Worcester			1427–1470	1462	
188	William Hastings, 1st Baron Hastings			c. 1431–1483	1462	Executed for treason
189	John Nevill, 1st Baron Montagu			c. 1431–1471	1462	
190	William Herbert, 1st Baron Herbert			c. 1423–1469	1462	Executed by Richard Neville
191	John Astley			d. 1488	1462	
192	Ferdinand I, King of Naples			1423–1494	1463	
193	Galeard de Durefort, Seigneur de Duras			c. 1430–1487	1463	Resigned c. 1476
194	John Scrope, 5th Baron Scrope of Bolton			1435–1498	1463	
195	Francesco Sforza, Duke of Milan			1401–1466	c.1463	
196	James Douglas, 9th Earl of Douglas			1426–1488	c.1463	
197	Robert Harcourt			1410–1470	c.1463	
198	Richard, Duke of Gloucester			1452–1485	c. 1466	Later Richard III, King of England
199	Anthony Woodville, Baron Scales			1442–1483	c.1466	Later Earl Rivers
200	Iñigo d'Avalos, Count of Monteodorisio			d. 1484	1467	Not Installed
F58	Lady Margaret Harcourt				c. 1468	Wife of Sir Robert Harcourt, KG
201	Charles, Duke of Burgundy			1433–1477	1470	

== Henry VI (readeption) ==
Henry VI (1470–1471)
N°	Name	Image	Arms	Life	Date	Notes
	During Henry's short second reign, no appointments were made to the Garter					

== Edward IV (second reign) ==
Edward IV (1471–1483)
N°	Name	Image	Arms	Life	Date	Notes
202	William Fitzalan, 9th Earl of Arundel			1417–1488	1472	
203	John de Mowbray, 4th Duke of Norfolk			1444–1476	1472	
204	John Stafford, 1st Earl of Wiltshire			1427–1473	1472	
205	Walter Devereux, 8th Baron Ferrers of Chartley			c. 1432–1485	1472	
206	Walter Blount, 1st Baron Mountjoy			c. 1420–1474	1472	
207	John Howard, 1st Baron Howard			c. 1425–1485	1472	Later Duke of Norfolk
208	John de la Pole, 2nd Duke of Suffolk			1442–1492	c. 1473	
209	Thomas Fitzalan, Baron Maltravers			d. 1524	1474	
210	William Parr, 1st Baron Parr of Kendal			c. 1434–1483	1474	
211	Henry Stafford, 2nd Duke of Buckingham			1454–1483	c. 1474	
212	Federico da Montefeltro, Duke of Urbino			1422–1482	1474	
213	Henry Percy, 4th Earl of Northumberland			c. 1449–1489	1474	
214	Edward, Prince of Wales			1470–1483?	1475	Later Edward V, King of England
215	Richard of Shrewsbury, 1st Duke of York			1473–1483?	1475	
216	Thomas Grey, 1st Marquess of Dorset			1451–1501	1476	Degraded 1484; Restored 1485.
217	Thomas Montgomery			d. 1495	1476	
F59	Queen Elizabeth			c. 1437 – 1492	1477	Wife of Edward IV; daughter of Jacquetta, Duchess of Bedford.
F60	Elizabeth of York			1466–1503	1477	Daughter of Edward IV; later wife of King Henry VII.
F61	Elizabeth, Duchess of Suffolk			1444 – c. 1503	1477	Sister of King Edward IV.
218	Ferdinand II, King of Aragon and Castile			1452–1516	1480	
219	Hercules d'Este, Duke of Modena and Ferrara			1431–1505	1480	
F62	Cecily of York			1469–1507	1480	Daughter of Edward IV, later Viscountess Welles.
F63	Mary of York			1467–1482	1480	Daughter of Edward IV
220	John II, King of Portugal			1455–1495	1482	Not Installed; Reelected 1488

== Edward V ==
Edward V (1483)
N°	Name	Image	Arms	Life	Date	Notes
	Edward V's short reign saw no Garter appointments					

== Richard III ==
Richard III (1483–1485)
N°	Name	Image	Arms	Life	Date	Notes
S8	King Richard III			1452–1485	1483	Became sovereign of the order upon accession to the throne. Previously a knight companion of the order.
221	Francis Lovell, 1st Viscount Lovell			1456–1487	1483	Degraded 1485
222	Thomas Howard, 1st Earl of Surrey			1443–1524	1483	Degraded 1485; Restored 1489; Later 2nd Duke of Norfolk.
223	Richard Ratcliffe			d. 1485	1483	
224	Thomas Stanley, 2nd Baron Stanley			c. 1435–1504	1483	Later Earl of Derby
225	Thomas Burgh			c. 1431–1496	1483	Later Baron Burgh
226	Richard Tunstall			1427–1492	c.1484	
227	John Conyers			d. 1490	c.1484	

== Henry VII ==
Henry VII (1485–1509)
N°	Name	Image	Arms	Life	Date	Notes
S9	King Henry VII			1457–1509	1485	Became sovereign of the order upon accession to the throne.
228	John de Vere, 13th Earl of Oxford			1442–1513	c.1486	
229	John Cheney			1442–1499	c.1486	Later Baron Cheney
230	John Dynham, 1st Baron Dynham			c. 1432–1501	c.1487	
231	Giles Daubeny, 1st Baron Daubeny			1451–1508	c.1487	
232	William Stanley			c. 1435–1495	c.1487	
233	George Stanley, 9th Baron Strange			1460–1503	c.1487	
234	George Talbot, 4th Earl of Shrewsbury			1468–1538	1488	
235	Edward Woodville, Lord Scales			c. 1456–1488	1488	
236	John Welles, 1st Viscount Welles			1450–1499	c.1488	
237	John Savage			d. 1491	1488	
F64	Margaret, Countess of Richmond and Derby			c. 1441/43 – 1509	1488	Mother of Henry VII
238	Robert Willoughby, 9th Baron Latymer			c. 1452–1502	c. 1489	
239	Maximilian, King of the Romans			1459–1519	c.1489	Later Maximilian I, Holy Roman Emperor
240	Arthur, Prince of Wales			1486–1502	1491	
241	Edward Courtenay, 1st Earl of Devon			d. 1509	c.1494	
242	Alfonso, Duke of Calabria			1448–1495	1493	Later Alfonso II, King of Naples
243	Edward Poynings			1459–1521	c. 1499	
244	John, King of Denmark, Sweden and Norway			1455–1513	c. 1499	Not Installed
245	Gilbert Talbot			d. 1517	c.1495	
246	Henry, Duke of York			1491–1547	1495	Later Prince of Wales; Henry VIII, King of England
247	Henry Percy, 5th Earl of Northumberland			1478–1527	c.1499	
248	Edward Stafford, 3rd Duke of Buckingham			1478–1521	c.1499	Degraded 1521
249	Charles Somerset			c. 1460–1526	c.1490	Later Earl of Worcester
250	Edmund de la Pole, 3rd Duke of Suffolk			c. 1471–1513	c.1499	Degraded 1501
251	Henry Bourchier, 2nd Earl of Essex			1472–1540	c.1499	
252	Thomas Lovell			d. 1524	c.1503	
253	Richard Pole			d. 1504	1499	
254	Richard Guildford			d. 1506	c.1503	
255	Reginald Bray			1440–1503	1501–1503	
256	Thomas Grey			1477–1530	1501–1503	Later 2nd Marquess of Dorset
257	Philip, Archduke of Austria and Duke of Burgundy			1478–1506	c.1503	Later Philip, King of Castile
258	Gerald Mór FitzGerald, 8th Earl of Kildare			c. 1456–1513	c.1504	
259	Guidobaldo da Montefeltro, Duke of Urbino			d. 1508	c.1504	
260	Richard Grey, 3rd Earl of Kent			1481–1524	1505	
261	Lord Henry Stafford			c. 1479–1523	1505	Later Earl of Wiltshire
262	Rhys ap Thomas			1449–1525	1505	
263	Sir Thomas Brandon			d. 1510	1507	
264	Charles, Infante of Spain, Archduke of Austria and Duke of Burgundy			1500–1558	1508	Later Charles V, Holy Roman Emperor

== Henry VIII ==
Henry VIII (1509–1547)
N°	Name	Image	Arms	Life	Date	Notes
S10	King Henry VIII			1491–1547	1509	Became sovereign of the order upon accession to the throne. Previously a knight companion of the order and ex officio member as Prince of Wales.
265	Thomas Darcy, 1st Baron Darcy de Darcy			d. 1537	1509	Degraded 1538
266	Edward Sutton, 2nd Baron Dudley			1459–1532	1509	
267	Manuel I, King of Portugal			1469–1521	1510	Not Installed
268	Thomas Howard			1473–1554	1510	Degraded 1547; Restored 1553; Later Duke of Norfolk.
269	Henry Marney			c. 1457–1523	1510	
270	Thomas West, 8th Baron De La Warr			c. 1457–1525	1510	
271	George Nevill, 5th Baron Bergavenny			d. 1535	1513	
272	Edward Howard			d. 1513	1513	
273	Charles Brandon, 1st Duke of Suffolk			c. 1484–1545	1513	
274	Giuliano de' Medici, Duke of Nemours			d. 1516	1514	Not Installed
275	Edward Stanley			d. 1523	1514	Later Baron Monteagle
276	Thomas Dacre, 2nd Baron Dacre			1467–1525	1518	
277	William Sandys			c.1470–1542	1518	Later Baron Sandys of the Vyne
278	Henry Courtenay, 10th Earl of Devon			c.1498–1539	1521	Degraded 1539; Later Marquess of Exeter.
279	Ferdinand, Infante of Spain, Archduke of Austria			1503–1564	1522	Later Ferdinand I, Holy Roman Emperor
280	Richard Wingfield			d. 1525	1522	
281	Thomas Boleyn			1477–1539	1523	Later Earl of Wiltshire
282	Walter Devereux, 10th Baron Ferrers			1491–1558	1523	Later Viscount Hereford
283	Arthur Plantagenet, 1st Viscount Lisle			c. 1470–1542	1524	
284	Robert Radcliffe, 10th Baron FitzWalter			d. 1542	1524	Later Earl of Sussex
285	William Fitzalan, 11th Earl of Arundel			c. 1484–1544	1525	
286	Thomas Manners, 14th Baron de Ros			d. 1543	1525	Later Earl of Rutland
287	Henry FitzRoy			1519–1536	1525	Later Duke of Richmond
288	Ralph Neville, 4th Earl of Westmorland			1498–1549	1525	
289	William Blount, 4th Baron Mountjoy			1478–1534	1526	
290	William FitzWilliam			c. 1490–1542	1526	
291	Henry Guildford			1489–c.1532	1526	
292	Francis I, King of France			1494–1547	1527	
293	John de Vere, 15th Earl of Oxford			d. 1540	1527	
294	Henry Percy, 6th Earl of Northumberland			c. 1502–1537	1531	
295	Anne de Montmorency, Duc de Montmorency			c. 1492–1567	1532	
296	Philip de Chabot, Comte de Neublanche			d. 1543	1532	
297	James V, King of Scotland			1512–1542	1535	
298	Nicholas Carew			d. 1539	1536	Degraded 1539
299	Henry Clifford, 1st Earl of Cumberland			1493–1542	1537	
300	Thomas Cromwell, 1st Baron Cromwell			1485–1540	1537	Degraded 1540; Later Earl of Essex.
301	John Russell, 1st Baron Russell			1485–1555	1539	Later Earl of Bedford
302	Thomas Cheney			d. 1558	1539	
303	William Kingston			d. 1540	1539	
304	Thomas Audley, 1st Baron Audley of Walden			1488–1544	1540	
305	Anthony Browne			c. 1500–1548	1540	
306	Edward Seymour, 1st Earl of Hertford			c. 1500–1552	1541	Later Duke of Somerset
307	Henry Howard, Earl of Surrey			c. 1517–1547	1541	Degraded 1547
308	Sir John Gage			d. 1556	1541	
309	Anthony Wingfield			d. 1552	1541	
310	John Dudley, 7th Viscount Lisle			1504–1553	1543	Degraded 1553; Later Duke of Northumberland.
311	William Paulet, 1st Baron St John			c. 1483–1572	1543	Later Marquess of Winchester
312	William Parr, 1st Baron Parr			c. 1512–1571	1543	Degraded 1553; Restored 1559; Later Marquess of Northampton.
313	John Wallop			d. 1551	1543	
314	Henry Fitzalan, 12th Earl of Arundel			c. 1513–1580	1544	
315	Anthony St Leger			d. 1559	1544	
316	Francis Talbot, 5th Earl of Shrewsbury			1500–1560	1545	
317	Thomas Wriothesley, 1st Baron Wriothesley			1505–1550	1545	Later Earl of Southampton

== Edward VI ==
Edward VI (1547–1553)
N°	Name	Image	Arms	Life	Date	Notes
S11	King Edward VI			1537–1553	1547	Became sovereign of the order upon accession to the throne; not appointed as Knight of the Garter when created Prince of Wales in 1537.
318	Henry Grey, 3rd Marquess of Dorset			d. 1554	1547	Degraded 1554; Later Duke of Suffolk.
319	Edward Stanley, 3rd Earl of Derby			c. 1508–1572	1547	
320	Thomas Seymour, 1st Baron Seymour of Sudeley			c. 1508–1549	1547	
321	William Paget			1506–1563	1547	Degraded 1552; Restored 1553; Later Baron Paget.
322	Francis Hastings, 2nd Earl of Huntingdon			c. 1514–1561	1549	
323	George Brooke, 9th Baron Cobham			c. 1497–1558	1549	
324	Thomas West, 9th Baron De La Warr			d. 1554	1549	
325	William Herbert			1506–1570	1549	Later Earl of Pembroke
326	Henry II, King of France			1519–1559	1551	
327	Edward Clinton, 9th Baron Clinton			1512–1585	1551	Later Earl of Lincoln
328	Thomas Darcy, 1st Baron Darcy of Chiche			1506–1558	1551	
329	Henry Neville, 5th Earl of Westmorland			c. 1525–1563	1552	
330	Andrew Dudley			d. 1559	1552	Degraded 1553

== Mary I ==
Mary I (1553–1558)
N°	Name	Image	Arms	Life	Date	Notes
S12	Queen Mary I			1516–1558	1553	Became sovereign of the order upon accession to the throne.
331	Philip, Prince of Asturias			1527–1598	1554	Later Philip II, King of Spain and King Consort of England.
332	Henry Radclyffe, 2nd Earl of Sussex			c. 1507–1557	1554	
333	Emmanuel Philibert, Duke of Savoy			1528–1580	1554	
334	William Howard, 1st Baron Howard of Effingham			c. 1510–1573	1554	
335	Edward Hastings			c. 1520–1572	1555	Later Baron Hastings of Loughborough
336	Anthony Browne, 1st Viscount Montagu			c. 1528–1592	1555	
337	Thomas Radclyffe, 3rd Earl of Sussex			c. 1525–1583	1557	
338	William Grey, 13th Baron Grey de Wilton			d. 1562	1557	
339	Robert Rochester			c. 1500–1557	1557	

== Elizabeth I ==
Elizabeth I (1558–1603)
N°	Name	Image	Arms	Life	Date	Notes
S13	Queen Elizabeth I			1533–1603	1558	Became sovereign of the order upon accession to the throne.
340	Thomas Howard, 4th Duke of Norfolk			1536–1572	1559	Degraded 1572
341	Henry Manners, 2nd Earl of Rutland			1526–1563	1559	
342	Robert Dudley			1532–1588	1559	Later Earl of Leicester
343	Adolf, Duke of Holstein-Gottorp			1526–1586	1560	
344	George Talbot, 6th Earl of Shrewsbury			1528–1590	1561	
345	Henry Carey, 1st Baron Hunsdon			1526–1596	1561	
346	Thomas Percy, 7th Earl of Northumberland			1528–1572	1563	Degraded 1569
347	Ambrose Dudley, 3rd Earl of Warwick			c. 1528–1590	1563	
348	Charles IX, King of France			1550–1574	1564	
349	Francis Russell, 2nd Earl of Bedford			1527–1585	1564	
350	Henry Sidney			1529–1586	1564	
351	Maximilian II, Holy Roman Emperor			1527–1576	1567	
352	Henry Hastings, 3rd Earl of Huntingdon			c. 1536–1595	1570	
353	William Somerset, 3rd Earl of Worcester			c. 1527–1589	1570	
354	Francis, Duc de Montmorency			1530–1579	1572	
355	Walter Devereux, 2nd Viscount Hereford			1541–1576	1572	Later Earl of Essex
356	William Cecil, 1st Baron Burghley			1521–1598	1572	
357	Arthur Grey, 14th Baron Grey de Wilton			1536–1593	1572	
358	Edmund Brydges, 2nd Baron Chandos			d. 1573	1572	
359	Henry Stanley, 4th Earl of Derby			1531–1593	1574	
360	Henry Herbert, 2nd Earl of Pembroke			c. 1534–1601	1574	
361	Henry III, King of France			1551–1589	1575	King of Poland 1573–1574
362	Charles Howard, 2nd Baron Howard of Effingham			c. 1536–1624	1575	Later Earl of Nottingham
363	Rudolf II, Holy Roman Emperor			1552–1612	1578	
364	Frederick II, King of Denmark and Norway			1534–1588	1578	
365	Johann Casimir of the Palatinate-Simmern			d. 1593	1579	
366	Edward Manners, 3rd Earl of Rutland			1548–1587	1584	
367	William Brooke, 10th Baron Cobham			1527–1597	1584	
368	Henry le Scrope, 9th Baron Scrope of Bolton			c. 1534–1591	1584	
369	Robert Devereux, 2nd Earl of Essex			1567–1601	1588	Degraded 1601
370	Thomas Butler, 10th Earl of Ormond			1532–1614	1588	
371	Christopher Hatton			d. 1591	1588	
372	Henry Radclyffe, 4th Earl of Sussex			c. 1532–1593	1589	
373	Thomas Sackville, 1st Baron Buckhurst			1536–1608	1589	Later Earl of Dorset
374	Henry IV, King of France			1553–1610	1590	
375	James VI, King of Scots			1566–1625	1590	Later James I, King of England
376	Gilbert Talbot, 7th Earl of Shrewsbury			1552–1616	1592	
377	George Clifford, 3rd Earl of Cumberland			1558–1605	1592	
378	Henry Percy, 9th Earl of Northumberland			1564–1632	1593	
379	Edward Somerset, 4th Earl of Worcester			c. 1550–1628	1593	
380	Thomas Burgh, 7th Baron Strabolgi			c. 1555–1597	1593	
381	Edmund Sheffield, 3rd Baron Sheffield			c. 1564–1646	1593	
382	Francis Knollys			d. 1596	1593	
383	Frederick I, Duke of Württemberg			d. 1608	1597	
384	Thomas Howard, 1st Baron Howard de Walden			1561–1626	1597	Later Earl of Suffolk
385	George Carey, 2nd Baron Hunsdon			c. 1556–1603	1597	
386	Charles Blount, 8th Baron Mountjoy			1563–1606	1597	Later Earl of Devonshire
387	Henry Lee			d. 1611	1597	
388	Robert Radclyffe, 5th Earl of Sussex			1573–1629	1599	
389	Henry Brooke, 11th Baron Cobham			1564–1619	1599	Degraded 1604
390	Thomas Scrope, 10th Baron Scrope of Bolton			c. 1567–1609	1599	
391	William Stanley, 6th Earl of Derby			c. 1561–1642	1601	
392	Thomas Cecil, 2nd Baron Burghley			1542–1623	1601	Later Earl of Exeter

== James I ==
James I (1603–1625)
N°	Name	Image	Arms	Life	Date	Notes
S14	James VI and I			1566–1625	1603	Became sovereign of the order upon accession to the throne. Previously a knight companion of the order.
393	Henry Frederick, Duke of Cornwall and Rothesay			1594–1612	1603	Later Prince of Wales
394	Christian IV, King of Denmark and Norway			1577–1648	1603	
395	Ludovic Stewart, 2nd Duke of Lennox			1574–1624	1603	
396	Henry Wriothesley, 3rd Earl of Southampton			1573–1624	1603	
397	John Erskine, 19th and 2nd Earl of Mar			1562–1634	1603	
398	William Herbert, 3rd Earl of Pembroke			1580–1630	1603	
399	Ulrich, Duke of Holstein			d. 1624	1605	Son of Frederick II of Denmark
400	Henry Howard, 1st Earl of Northampton			1540–1614	1605	
401	Robert Cecil, 1st Earl of Salisbury			1563–1612	1606	
402	Thomas Howard, 3rd Viscount Howard of Bindon			d. 1611	1606	
403	George Home, 1st Earl of Dunbar			d. 1612	1608	
404	Philip Herbert, 1st Earl of Montgomery			c. 1584–1650	1608	Later Earl of Pembroke
405	Charles, Duke of York			1600–1649	1611	Later Prince of Wales; Charles I, King of England.
406	Thomas Howard, 21st Earl of Arundel			1585–1646	1611	
407	Robert Carr, 1st Viscount Rochester			c. 1587–1645	1611	Later Earl of Somerset
408	Frederick V, Elector Palatine			1596–1632	1612	
409	Maurice de Nassau			1567–1625	1612	Later Maurice, Prince of Orange
410	Thomas Erskine, 1st Viscount of Fentoun			1566–1639	1615	Later Earl of Kellie
411	William Knollys, 1st Baron Knollys			c. 1547–1632	1615	Later Earl of Banbury
412	Francis Manners, 6th Earl of Rutland			1578–1632	1616	
413	George Villiers, 1st Viscount Villiers			1592–1628	1616	Later Duke of Buckingham
414	Robert Sidney, 1st Viscount Lisle			1563–1626	1616	Later Earl of Leicester
415	James Hamilton, 2nd Marquess of Hamilton			1589–1625	1623	
416	Esmé Stewart, 3rd Duke of Lennox			1579–1624	1624	
417	Christian, Duke of Brunswick-Wolfenbüttel			1599–1626	1624	Son of the Duke
418	William Cecil, 2nd Earl of Salisbury			1591–1668	1624	
419	James Hay, 1st Earl of Carlisle			c. 1580–1636	1624	
420	Edward Sackville, 4th Earl of Dorset			1590–1652	1625	
421	Henry Rich, 1st Earl of Holland			1590–1649	1625	

== Charles I ==
Charles I (1625–1649)
N°	Name	Image	Arms	Life	Date	Notes
S15	King Charles I			1600–1649	1625	Became sovereign of the order upon accession to the throne. Previously a knight companion of the order and ex officio member as Prince of Wales.
422	Thomas Howard, 1st Viscount Andover			c. 1590–1669	1625	Later Earl of Berkshire
423	Claude de Lorraine, Duc de Chevreuse			d. 1657	1625	
424	Gustavus Adolphus, King of Sweden			1594–1632	1628	
425	Frederick Henry, Prince of Orange			1584–1647	1627	
426	Theophilus Howard, 2nd Earl of Suffolk			1584–1640	1627	
427	William Compton, 1st Earl of Northampton			d. 1630	1628	
428	Richard Weston, 1st Baron Weston			1577–1635	1630	Later Earl of Portland
429	Robert Bertie, 1st Earl of Lindsey			1582–1642	1630	
430	William Cecil, 2nd Earl of Exeter			1566–1640	1630	
431	James Hamilton, 3rd Marquess of Hamilton			1606–1649	1630	Later Duke of Hamilton
432	Charles I Louis, Elector Palatine			1617–1680	1633	
433	James Stewart, 4th Duke of Lennox			1612–1655	1633	
434	Henry Danvers, 1st Earl of Danby			1573–1644	1633	
435	William Douglas, 7th Earl of Morton			1582–1648	1633	
436	Algernon Percy, 10th Earl of Northumberland			1602–1668	1635	
437	Charles, Prince of Wales			1630–1685	1638	Later Charles II, King of England
438	Thomas Wentworth, 1st Earl of Strafford			1593–1641	1640	
439	James, Duke of York			1633–1701	1642	Later James II, King of England
440	Prince Rupert of the Rhine			1619–1682	1642	
441	William II, Prince of Orange			1625–1650	1645	
442	Bernard de Nogaret de Foix, Duc d'Épernon			d. 1661	1645	

== Charles II ==
Charles II (1658–1685)
N°	Name	Image	Arms	Life	Date	Notes
S16	King Charles II			1630–1685	1660	Became sovereign of the order upon accession to the throne. Previously an ex officio member as Prince of Wales.
443	Prince Maurice of the Rhine			d. 1652	1649	Not Installed
444	James Butler, 1st Marquess of Ormonde			1610–1688	1649	Later Duke of Ormonde
445	Edward, Count Palatine of Simmern			d. 1663	1649	
446	George Villiers, 2nd Duke of Buckingham			1628–1687	1649	
447	William Seymour, 1st Marquess of Hertford			1588–1660	1650	Not Installed; Later Duke of Somerset
448	Thomas Wriothesley, 4th Earl of Southampton			1607–1667	1650	
449	William Hamilton, 2nd Duke of Hamilton			1616–1651	1650	Not Installed
450	William Cavendish, 1st Marquess of Newcastle			1593–1676	1650	Later Duke of Newcastle
451	James Graham, 1st Marquess of Montrose			1612–1650	1650	Not Installed
452	James Stanley, 7th Earl of Derby			1607–1651	1650	Not Installed
453	George Digby, 2nd Earl of Bristol			1612–1677	1653	
454	Henry Stuart, Duke of Gloucester			1640–1660	1653	Not Installed
455	Henri de la Trémoille, Prince de Taranto			d. 1672	1653	
456	William III, Prince of Orange			1650–1702	1653	Later William III, King of England
457	Frederick William I, Elector of Brandenburg			1620–1688	1654	
458	John Gaspar Ferdinand de Marchin, Comte de Granville			d. 1673	1658	
459	George Monck			1608–1670	1660	Later Duke of Albemarle
460	Edward Montagu, 1st Earl of Sandwich			1625–1672	1660	
461	Aubrey de Vere, 20th Earl of Oxford			1626–1703	1660	
462	Charles Stewart, 3rd Duke of Richmond			1639–1672	1661	
463	Montagu Bertie, 2nd Earl of Lindsey			c. 1608–1666	1661	
464	Edward Montagu, 2nd Earl of Manchester			1602–1671	1661	
465	William Wentworth, 2nd Earl of Strafford			1626–1695	1661	
466	Christian, Prince Royal of Denmark			1646–1699	1663	Later Christian V, King of Denmark and Norway
467	James Scott, 1st Duke of Monmouth			1649–1685	1663	Degraded 1685
468	James Stuart, Duke of Cambridge			1663–1667	1666	Not Installed
469	Charles XI, King of Sweden			1655–1697	1668	Dubbed in the Hall of State in the old Tre Kronor palace in Stockholm by the English Ambassador to Sweden, Charles Howard, 1st Earl of Carlisle, on 29 July 1669.
470	John George II, Elector of Saxony			1613–1680	1668	
471	Christopher Monck, 2nd Duke of Albemarle			1653–1688	1670	
472	John Maitland, 1st Duke of Lauderdale			1616–1682	1672	
473	Henry Somerset, 3rd Marquess of Worcester			1629–1700	1672	Later Duke of Beaufort
474	Henry Jermyn, 1st Earl of St Albans			d. 1684	1672	
475	William Russell, 5th Earl of Bedford			1613–1700	1672	Later Duke of Bedford
476	Henry Bennet, 1st Earl of Arlington			1618–1685	1672	
477	Thomas Butler, 6th Earl of Ossory			d. 1680	1672	
478	Charles FitzRoy, 1st Earl of Southampton			1662–1730	1673	Later Duke of Cleveland, Duke of Southampton
479	John Sheffield, 3rd Earl of Mulgrave			1647–1721	1674	Later Duke of Buckingham and Normanby
480	Henry Cavendish, 2nd Duke of Newcastle-upon-Tyne			1630–1691	1677	
481	Thomas Osborne, 1st Earl of Danby			1632–1712	1677	Later Duke of Leeds
482	Henry FitzRoy, 1st Duke of Grafton			1663–1690	1680	
483	James Cecil, 3rd Earl of Salisbury			1648–1683	1680	
484	Charles II, Elector Palatine			1651–1685	1680	
485	Charles Lennox, 1st Duke of Richmond			1672–1723	1681	
486	William Hamilton, Duke of Hamilton			1635–1694	1682	
487	Prince George of Denmark			1653–1708	1684	
488	Charles Seymour, 6th Duke of Somerset			1662–1748	1684	
489	George FitzRoy, 1st Duke of Northumberland			1665–1716	1684	

== James II ==
James II (1685–1688)
N°	Name	Image	Arms	Life	Date	Notes
S17	King James II			1633–1701	1685	Became sovereign of the order upon accession to the throne. Previously a knight companion of the order.
490	Henry Howard, 7th Duke of Norfolk			1654–1701	1685	Earl Marshal
491	Henry Mordaunt, 2nd Earl of Peterborough			1621–1697	1685	Groom of the Stole
492	Laurence Hyde, 1st Earl of Rochester			1642–1711	1685	Lord High Treasurer
493	Louis de Duras, 2nd Earl of Feversham			1641–1709	1685	Captain and Colonel of His Majesty's Own Troop of Horse Guards.
494	Robert Spencer, 2nd Earl of Sunderland			1640–1702	1687	Lord President of the Council
495	James FitzJames, 1st Duke of Berwick			1670–1734	1688	Not Installed
496	James Butler, 2nd Duke of Ormonde			1665–1745	1688	Degraded 1716

== William III & Mary II ==
William III & Mary II (1689–1694)
N°	Name	Image	Arms	Life	Date	Notes
S18	Queen Mary II			1662–1694	1689	Became co-sovereigns of the order upon accession to the throne. The latter was previously a knight companion of the order.
S19	King William III			1650–1702	1689	Became co-sovereigns of the order upon accession to the throne. The latter was previously a knight companion of the order.
497	Frederic Herman de Schomberg, 1st Duke of Schomberg			1615–1690	1689	Master-General of the Ordnance
498	William Cavendish, 4th Earl of Devonshire			1641–1707	1689	Later Duke of Devonshire
499	Frederick III, Elector of Brandenburg			1657–1713	1690	Later Frederick I, King in Prussia
500	George William, Duke of Brunswick			1624–1705	1690	
501	John George IV, Elector of Saxony			1668–1694	1692	
502	Charles Sackville, 6th Earl of Dorset			1638–1706	1692	Lord Chamberlain
503	Charles Talbot, 12th Earl of Shrewsbury			1660–1718	1694	Later Duke of Shrewsbury

== William III (sole) ==
William III (1694–1702)
N°	Name	Image	Arms	Life	Date	Notes
S19	King William III			1650–1702	1689	Became sovereign of the order upon accession to the throne. Previously a knight companion of the order.
504	Prince William, Duke of Gloucester			1689–1700	1696	
505	William Bentinck, 1st Earl of Portland			1649–1709	1697	Keeper of the Privy Purse
506	John Holles, 1st Duke of Newcastle			1662–1711	1698	Lord Lieutenant of Nottinghamshire
507	Thomas Herbert, 8th Earl of Pembroke			c. 1656–1733	1700	Lord President of the Council
508	Arnold van Keppel, 1st Earl of Albemarle			1670–1718	1700	Master of the Robes
509	George Louis, Elector of Hanover			1660–1727	1701	Later George I, King of Great Britain
510	James Douglas, 2nd Duke of Queensberry			1662–1711	1701	Keeper of the Privy Seal of Scotland

== Anne ==
Anne (1702–1714)
N°	Name	Image	Arms	Life	Date	Notes
S20	Queen Anne			1665–1714	1702	Became sovereign of the order upon accession to the throne.
511	Wriothesley Russell, 2nd Duke of Bedford			1680–1711	1702	Lord Lieutenant of Cambridgeshire, Bedfordshire and Middlesex.
512	John Churchill, 1st Earl of Marlborough			1650–1722	1702	Later Duke of Marlborough
513	Meinhardt Schomberg, 3rd Duke of Schomberg			1641–1719	1703	Former Commander-in-Chief of the Forces
514	Sidney Godolphin, 1st Baron Godolphin			1645–1712	1704	Later Earl of Godolphin
515	Prince George Augustus of Brunswick-Lüneburg			1683–1760	1706	Later Prince of Wales; George II, King of Great Britain.
516	William Cavendish, 2nd Duke of Devonshire			1673–1729	1710	Lord Steward
517	John Campbell, 2nd Duke of Argyll			1680–1743	1710	Former Lord High Commissioner to the Parliament of Scotland.
518	Henry Somerset, 2nd Duke of Beaufort			1684–1714	1712	Captain of the Gentlemen Pensioners
519	James Hamilton, 4th Duke of Hamilton			1658–1712	1712	Master-General of the Ordnance
520	Henry Grey, 1st Duke of Kent			1671–1740	1712	Former Lord Chamberlain
521	John Poulett, 1st Earl Poulett			c. 1663–1743	1712	Lord Steward
522	Robert Harley, 1st Earl of Oxford and Earl Mortimer			1661–1724	1712	Lord High Treasurer
523	Thomas Wentworth, 1st Earl of Strafford			1672–1739	1712	First Lord of the Admiralty
524	Charles Mordaunt, 3rd Earl of Peterborough			c. 1658–1735	1713	Lord Lieutenant of Northamptonshire

== George I ==
George I (1714–1727)
N°	Name	Image	Arms	Life	Date	Notes
S21	King George I			1660–1727	1714	Became sovereign of the order upon accession to the throne. Previously a knight companion of the order.
525	Charles Paulet, 2nd Duke of Bolton			1661–1722	1714	Lord Lieutenant of Hampshire
526	John Manners, 2nd Duke of Rutland			1676–1721	1714	Lord Lieutenant of Leicestershire
527	Lionel Cranfield Sackville, 7th Earl of Dorset			1688–1765	1714	Later Duke of Dorset
528	Charles Montagu, 1st Earl of Halifax			1661–1715	1714	First Lord of the Treasury
529	Prince Frederick Louis of Brunswick-Lüneburg			1707–1751	1717	Later Prince of Wales
530	Prince Ernest Augustus of Brunswick-Lüneburg			1674–1728	1717	Later Duke of York and Albany
531	Charles Beauclerk, 1st Duke of St Albans			1670–1726	1718	Captain of the Gentlemen Pensioners
532	John Montagu, 2nd Duke of Montagu			1689–1749	1718	Master of the Great Wardrobe
533	Thomas Pelham-Holles, 1st Duke of Newcastle			1693–1768	1718	Prime Minister 1754–1756, 1757–1762
534	James Berkeley, 3rd Earl of Berkeley			1680–1736	1718	First Lord of the Admiralty
535	Evelyn Pierrepont, 1st Duke of Kingston-upon-Hull			1665–1726	1719	Lord President of the Council
536	Charles Spencer, 3rd Earl of Sunderland			1675–1722	1719	First Lord of the Treasury
537	Charles FitzRoy, 2nd Duke of Grafton			1683–1757	1721	Lord Lieutenant of Ireland
538	Henry Clinton, 7th Earl of Lincoln			1684–1728	1721	Former Paymaster of the Forces
539	Charles Powlett, 3rd Duke of Bolton			1685–1754	1722	Lord Lieutenant of Dorset and Hampshire
540	John Manners, 3rd Duke of Rutland			1696–1779	1722	Lord Lieutenant of Leicestershire
541	John Ker, 1st Duke of Roxburghe			1680–1741	1722	Secretary of State for Scotland
542	Richard Lumley, 2nd Earl of Scarbrough			1686–1740	1724	Lord Lieutenant of Northumberland
543	Charles Townshend, 2nd Viscount Townshend			1674–1738	1724	Northern Secretary
544	Charles Lennox, 2nd Duke of Richmond			1701–1750	1726	Former Grand Master of the Premier Grand Lodge of England.
545	Robert Walpole			1676–1745	1726	Later Earl of Orford (Then) Current Prime Minister.

== George II ==
George II (1727–1760)
N°	Name	Image	Arms	Life	Date	Notes
S22	King George II			1683–1760	1727	Became sovereign of the order upon accession to the throne. Previously a knight companion of the order and ex officio member as Prince of Wales.
546	Prince William, Duke of Cumberland			1721–1765	1730	
547	Philip Stanhope, 4th Earl of Chesterfield			1694–1773	1730	Lord Steward
548	Richard Boyle, 3rd Earl of Burlington			1694–1753	1730	Lord Treasurer of Ireland
549	William IV, Prince of Orange			1711–1751	1733	
550	William Cavendish, 3rd Duke of Devonshire			1698–1755	1733	Lord Steward
551	Spencer Compton, 1st Earl of Wilmington			c. 1674–1743	1733	Prime Minister 1742–1743
552	William Capell, 3rd Earl of Essex			1697–1743	1738	Lord Lieutenant of Hertfordshire
553	James Waldegrave, 1st Earl Waldegrave			1684–1741	1738	Ambassador to France
554	Frederick, Landgrave of Hesse-Kassel			1720–1785	1741	
555	Charles Beauclerk, 2nd Duke of St Albans			1696–1751	1741	Lord Lieutenant of Berkshire
556	Charles Spencer, 3rd Duke of Marlborough			1706–1758	1741	Lord Lieutenant of Buckinghamshire and Oxfordshire
557	Evelyn Pierrepont, 2nd Duke of Kingston-upon-Hull			1711–1773	1741	Master of the Staghounds
558	William Bentinck, 2nd Duke of Portland			1709–1762	1741	
559	Frederick III, Duke of Saxe-Gotha-Altenburg			1699–1772	1741	
560	Johann Adolf II, Duke of Saxe-Weissenfels			d. 1746	1745	Not Installed
561	Prince George William Frederick			1738–1820	1749	Later George III, King of Great Britain
562	Charles William Frederick, Margrave of Brandenburg-Ansbach			d. 1757	1749	
563	Thomas Osborne, 4th Duke of Leeds			1713–1789	1749	
564	John Russell, 4th Duke of Bedford			1710–1771	1749	Secretary of State for the Southern Department
565	Willem van Keppel, 2nd Earl of Albemarle			1702–1754	1749	Ambassador to France
566	John Carteret, 2nd Earl Granville			1690–1763	1749	Former Northern Secretary
567	Prince Edward			1739–1767	1752	Later Duke of York and Albany
568	William V, Prince of Orange			1748–1806	1752	
569	Henry Pelham-Clinton, 9th Earl of Lincoln			1720–1794	1752	Later Duke of Newcastle
570	Daniel Finch, 8th Earl of Winchilsea			1689–1769	1752	Former First Lord of the Admiralty
571	George Montagu, 4th Earl of Cardigan			1712–1790	1752	Later Duke of Montagu
572	William Cavendish, 4th Duke of Devonshire			1720–1764	1756	(Then) Current Prime Minister
573	Henry Howard, 4th Earl of Carlisle			1684–1758	1756	
574	Hugh Percy, 2nd Earl of Northumberland			c. 1714–1786	1756	Later Duke of Northumberland
575	Francis Seymour-Conway, 1st Earl of Hertford			1718–1794	1756	Later Marquess of Hertford
576	James Waldegrave, 2nd Earl Waldegrave			1715–1763	1757	Lord Warden of the Stannaries
577	Ferdinand, Prince of Brunswick-Bevern			1721–1792	1759	

== George III ==
George III (1760–1820)
N°	Name	Image	Arms	Life	Date	Notes
S23	King George III			1738–1820	1761	Became sovereign of the order upon accession to the throne. Previously a knight companion of the order and ex officio member as Prince of Wales.
578	Charles Watson-Wentworth, 2nd Marquess of Rockingham			1730–1782	1760	Prime Minister 1765–1766, 1782
579	Richard Grenville-Temple, 2nd Earl Temple			1711–1779	1760	Lord Privy Seal
580	Prince William Henry			1743–1805	1762	Later Duke of Gloucester and Edinburgh
581	John Stuart, 3rd Earl of Bute			1713–1792	1762	(Then) Current Prime Minister
582	Adolphus Frederick IV, Duke of Mecklenburg-Strelitz			1738–1794	1764	
583	George Montagu-Dunk, 2nd Earl of Halifax			1716–1771	1764	Not Installed
584	George Augustus Frederick, Prince of Wales			1762–1830	1765	Later George IV, King of the United Kingdom
585	Charles William Ferdinand, Hereditary Prince of Brunswick-Wolfenbüttel			1735–1806	1765	Later Duke of Brunswick-Wolfenbüttel
586	George Keppel, 3rd Earl of Albemarle			1724–1772	1765	Colonel of the 3rd (The King's Own); Regiment of Dragoons
587	Prince Henry			1745–1790	1767	Later Duke of Cumberland and Strathearn
588	George Spencer, 4th Duke of Marlborough			1739–1817	1768	Lord Lieutenant of Oxfordshire and former Lord Privy Seal.
589	Augustus FitzRoy, 3rd Duke of Grafton			1735–1811	1769	(Then) Current Prime Minister
590	Granville Leveson-Gower, 2nd Earl Gower			1721–1803	1771	Later Marquess of Stafford
591	Prince Frederick Augustus			1763–1827	1771	Later Duke of York and Albany
592	Frederick North, Lord North			1732–1792	1772	Not Installed; Later Earl of Guilford (Then) Current Prime Minister
593	Henry Howard, 12th Earl of Suffolk			1739–1779	1778	Not Installed
594	William Nassau de Zuylestein, 4th Earl of Rochford			1717–1781	1778	Not Installed
595	Thomas Thynne, 3rd Viscount Weymouth			1734–1796	1778	Not Installed; Later Marquess of Bath.
596	Prince William Henry			1765–1837	1782	Later Duke of Clarence and St Andrews; King William IV of the United Kingdom
597	Charles Lennox, 3rd Duke of Richmond			1735–1806	1782	Master-General of the Ordnance
598	William Cavendish, 5th Duke of Devonshire			1748–1811	1782	Lord Treasurer of Ireland
599	William Petty, 2nd Earl of Shelburne			1737–1805	1782	Later Marquess of Lansdowne (Then) Current Prime Minister
600	Charles Manners, 4th Duke of Rutland			1754–1787	1782	Not Installed
601	Prince Edward			1767–1820	1786	First Royal Knight; later Duke of Kent and Strathearn.
602	Prince Ernest Augustus			1771–1851	1786	Royal Knight; later Duke of Cumberland and Teviotdale and King of Hanover
603	Prince Augustus Frederick			1773–1843	1786	Royal Knight; later Duke of Sussex.
604	Prince Adolphus Frederick			1774–1850	1786	Royal Knight; later Duke of Cambridge.
605	William IX, Landgrave of Hesse-Kassel			1743–1821	1786	
606	Henry Somerset, 5th Duke of Beaufort			1744–1803	1786	Lord Lieutenant of Monmouthshire.
607	George Nugent-Temple-Grenville, 1st Marquess of Buckingham			1753–1813	1786	Lord Lieutenant of Buckinghamshire and former Foreign Secretary.
608	Charles Cornwallis, 2nd Earl Cornwallis			1738–1805	1786	Later Marquess Cornwallis
609	John Sackville, 3rd Duke of Dorset			1745–1799	1788	Not Installed
610	Hugh Percy, 2nd Duke of Northumberland			1742–1817	1788	Lord Lieutenant of Northumberland
611	Ernest II, Duke of Saxe-Gotha-Altenburg			1745–1804	1790	
612	Francis Osborne, 5th Duke of Leeds			1751–1799	1790	Not Installed
613	John Pitt, 2nd Earl of Chatham			1756–1835	1790	First Lord of the Admiralty
614	James Cecil, 1st Marquess of Salisbury			1748–1823	1793	Former Lord Chamberlain
615	John Fane, 10th Earl of Westmorland			1759–1841	1793	Lord Lieutenant of Ireland
616	Frederick Howard, 5th Earl of Carlisle			1748–1825	1793	Former Lord Steward
617	Henry Scott, 3rd Duke of Buccleuch			1746–1812	1794	Lord Lieutenant of Midlothian
618	Prince William Frederick			1776–1834	1794	Royal Knight; later Duke of Gloucester.
619	William Cavendish-Bentinck, 3rd Duke of Portland			1738–1809	1794	Prime Minister 1783, 1807–1809
620	Richard Howe, 1st Earl Howe			1726–1799	1797	Not Installed
621	George Spencer, 2nd Earl Spencer			1758–1834	1799	First Lord of the Admiralty
622	John Jeffreys Pratt, 2nd Earl Camden			1759–1840	1799	Later Marquess Camden
623	John Ker, 3rd Duke of Roxburghe			1740–1804	1801	Groom of the Stole and Lord Lieutenant of Roxburghshire.
624	John Manners, 5th Duke of Rutland			1778–1857	1803	Lord Lieutenant of Leicestershire
625	Philip Yorke, 3rd Earl of Hardwicke			1757–1834	1803	Lord Lieutenant of Ireland
626	Henry Somerset, 6th Duke of Beaufort			1766–1835	1805	Lord Lieutenant of Brecknockshire and Monmouthshire.
627	John Hamilton, 1st Marquess of Abercorn			1756–1818	1805	
628	George Herbert, 11th Earl of Pembroke			1759–1827	1805	Lord Lieutenant of Wiltshire
629	George Finch, 9th Earl of Winchilsea			1752–1826	1805	Lord Lieutenant of Rutland
630	Philip Stanhope, 5th Earl of Chesterfield			1755–1815	1805	Former Master of the Horse
631	George Legge, 3rd Earl of Dartmouth			1755–1810	1805	Former Lord Chamberlain
632	George Granville Leveson-Gower, 2nd Marquess of Stafford			1758–1833	1806	Later Duke of Sutherland
633	Francis Ingram-Seymour-Conway, 2nd Marquess of Hertford			1743–1822	1807	Former Master of the Horse
634	William Lowther, 1st Earl of Lonsdale			1757–1844	1807	Lord Lieutenant of Cumberland and Westmorland.
635	Richard Wellesley, 1st Marquess Wellesley			1760–1842	1810	Secretary of State for Foreign Affairs.

== The Regency ==
The Regency (1811–1820)
N°	Name	Image	Arms	Life	Date	Notes
636	Charles Lennox, 4th Duke of Richmond			1764–1819	1812	Lord Lieutenant of Ireland
637	James Graham, 3rd Duke of Montrose			1755–1836	1812	Master of the Horse
638	Francis Rawdon-Hastings, 2nd Earl of Moira			1754–1826	1812	Later Marquess of Hastings
639	Henry Pelham-Clinton, 4th Duke of Newcastle			1785–1851	1812	Lord Lieutenant of Nottinghamshire
640	Arthur Wellesley, 1st Marquess of Wellington			1769–1852	1813	Later Duke of Wellington; Prime Minister 1828–1830, 1834
641	Alexander I, Emperor and Autocrat of all the Russias			1777–1825	1813	
642	Louis XVIII, King of France			1755–1824	1814	
643	Francis I, Emperor of Austria			1768–1835	1814	
644	Frederick William III, King of Prussia			1770–1840	1814	
645	Robert Jenkinson, 2nd Earl of Liverpool			1770–1828	1814	(Then) Current Prime Minister
646	Robert Stewart, Viscount Castlereagh			1769–1822	1814	Later Marquess of Londonderry
647	Ferdinand VII, King of Spain			1784–1833	1814	
648	William VI, Prince of Orange			1772–1843	1814	Later William I, King of the Netherlands
649	Leopold George Frederick, Duke of Saxe-Coburg-Saalfeld			1790–1865	1816	Later Léopold I, King of the Belgians
650	Henry Bathurst, 3rd Earl Bathurst			1762–1834	1817	Secretary of State for War and the Colonies
651	Henry Paget, 1st Marquess of Anglesey			1768–1854	1818	Lord Lieutenant of Anglesey
652	Hugh Percy, 3rd Duke of Northumberland			1785–1847	1819	Lord Lieutenant of Northumberland

== George IV ==
George IV (1820–1830)
N°	Name	Image	Arms	Life	Date	Notes
S24	King George IV			1762–1830	1820	Became sovereign of the order upon accession to the throne. Previously an ex officio member as Prince of Wales.
653	Richard Temple-Nugent-Brydges-Chandos-Grenville, 2nd Marquess of Buckingham			1776–1839	1820	Later Duke of Buckingham
654	Frederick VI, King of Denmark			1768–1839	1822	
655	John VI, King of Portugal			1767–1826	1822	
656	George Cholmondeley, 1st Marquess of Cholmondeley			1749–1827	1822	Vice-Admiral of Cheshire and former Lord Steward
657	Francis Seymour-Conway, 3rd Marquess of Hertford			1777–1842	1822	Lord Warden of the Stannaries
658	Thomas Thynne, 2nd Marquess of Bath			1765–1837	1823	Lord Lieutenant of Somerset
659	Charles X, King of France			1757–1836	1825	
660	Charles Sackville-Germain, 5th Duke of Dorset			1767–1843	1826	Master of the Horse
661	Nicholas I, Emperor and Autocrat of all the Russias			1796–1855	1827	
662	George Osborne, 6th Duke of Leeds			1775–1838	1827	Master of the Horse
663	William Cavendish, 6th Duke of Devonshire			1790–1858	1827	Lord Chamberlain of the Household
664	Brownlow Cecil, 2nd Marquess of Exeter			1795–1867	1827	Lord Lieutenant of Rutland
665	Charles Gordon-Lennox, 5th Duke of Richmond			1791–1860	1829	Colonel of the Royal Sussex Light Infantry Militia
666	George Ashburnham, 3rd Earl of Ashburnham			1760–1830	1829	

== William IV ==
William IV (1830–1837)
N°	Name	Image	Arms	Life	Date	Notes
S25	King William IV			1765–1837	1830	Became sovereign of the order upon accession to the throne. Previously a knight companion of the order.
667	Bernhard II, Duke of Saxe-Meiningen			1800–1882	1830	
668	William I, King of Württemberg			1781–1864	1830	
669	John Russell, 6th Duke of Bedford			1766–1839	1830	Former Lord Lieutenant of Ireland
670	Charles Grey, 2nd Earl Grey			1764–1845	1831	(Then) Current Prime Minister
671	William, Duke of Brunswick			1806–1884	1831	
672	Bernard Howard, 12th Duke of Norfolk			1765–1842	1834	Earl Marshal
673	George FitzRoy, 4th Duke of Grafton			1760–1844	1834	Lord Lieutenant of Suffolk
674	Walter Montagu Douglas Scott, 5th Duke of Buccleuch			1806–1884	1835	Lord Lieutenant of Midlothian
675	Prince George of Cumberland			1819–1878	1835	Later George V, King of Hanover
676	Prince George of Cambridge			1819–1904	1835	Later Duke of Cambridge
677	Alexander Hamilton, 10th Duke of Hamilton			1767–1852	1836	Lord Lieutenant of Lanarkshire
678	Henry Petty-Fitzmaurice, 3rd Marquess of Lansdowne			1780–1863	1836	Lord President of the Council
679	George Howard, 6th Earl of Carlisle			1773–1848	1837	Lord Lieutenant of the East Riding of Yorkshire and former Lord Privy Seal
680	Edward St Maur, 11th Duke of Somerset			1775–1855	1837	Vice-Admiral of Somerset

== Victoria ==
Victoria (1837–1901)
N°	Name	Image	Arms	Life	Date	Notes
S26	Queen Victoria			1819–1901	1837	Became sovereign of the order upon accession to the throne.
681	Carl, 3rd Prince of Leiningen			1804–1856	1837	
682	Ernest I, Duke of Saxe-Coburg and Gotha			1784–1844	1838	
683	Edward Smith-Stanley, 13th Earl of Derby			1775–1851	1839	Lord Lieutenant of Lancashire
684	William Vane, 1st Duke of Cleveland			1766–1842	1839	Lord Lieutenant of County Durham
685	Prince Albert of Saxe-Coburg and Gotha			1819–1861	1839	Later Albert, Prince Consort
686	George Sutherland-Leveson-Gower, 2nd Duke of Sutherland			1786–1861	1841	Lord Lieutenant of Sutherland and Shropshire
687	Robert Grosvenor, 1st Marquess of Westminster			1767–1845	1841	Lord Lieutenant of Flintshire
688	Frederick William IV, King of Prussia			1795–1861	1842	
689	Frederick Augustus II, King of Saxony			1797–1854	1842	
690	Henry Somerset, 7th Duke of Beaufort			1792–1853	1842	
691	Richard Temple-Nugent-Brydges-Chandos-Grenville, 2nd Duke of Buckingham and Chandos			1797–1861	1842	Lord Privy Seal
692	James Gascoyne-Cecil, 2nd Marquess of Salisbury			1791–1868	1842	Lord Lieutenant of Middlesex
693	Henry Vane, 2nd Duke of Cleveland			1788–1864	1842	
694	Louis Philippe, King of the French			1773–1850	1844	
695	Ernest II, Duke of Saxe-Coburg and Gotha			1818–1893	1844	
696	Thomas de Grey, 2nd Earl de Grey			1781–1859	1844	Lord Lieutenant of Ireland
697	James Hamilton, 2nd Marquess of Abercorn			1811–1885	1844	Later Duke of Abercorn
698	Charles Chetwynd-Talbot, 2nd Earl Talbot			1777–1849	1844	Lord Lieutenant of Staffordshire and former Lord Lieutenant of Ireland
699	Edward Herbert, 2nd Earl of Powis			1785–1848	1844	Lord Lieutenant of Montgomeryshire
700	George Pratt, 2nd Marquess Camden			1799–1866	1846	
701	Richard Seymour-Conway, 4th Marquess of Hertford			1800–1870	1846	
702	Francis Russell, 7th Duke of Bedford			1788–1861	1847	
703	Henry Howard, 13th Duke of Norfolk			1791–1856	1848	Earl Marshal and Master of the Horse
704	George Villiers, 4th Earl of Clarendon			1800–1870	1849	Lord Lieutenant of Ireland
705	Frederick Spencer, 4th Earl Spencer			1798–1857	1849	Former Lord Chamberlain
706	Constantine Phipps, 1st Marquess of Normanby			1797–1863	1851	Ambassador to France
707	Charles Wentworth-Fitzwilliam, 5th Earl Fitzwilliam			1786–1857	1851	Former President of the Surtees Society
708	Algernon Percy, 4th Duke of Northumberland			1792–1865	1853	Former First Lord of the Admiralty
709	Charles Vane, 3rd Marquess of Londonderry			1778–1854	1853	Lord Lieutenant of Durham
710	George Howard, 7th Earl of Carlisle			1802–1864	1855	Lord Lieutenant of Ireland
711	Francis Egerton, 1st Earl of Ellesmere			1800–1857	1855	Former Secretary at War
712	George Hamilton-Gordon, 4th Earl of Aberdeen			1784–1860	1855	Prime Minister 1852–1855; Knight of the Thistle
713	Napoleon III, Emperor of the French			1808–1873	1855	
714	Victor Emmanuel II, King of Sardinia			1820–1878	1855	Later Victor Emmanuel II, King of Italy
715	Hugh Fortescue, 2nd Earl Fortescue			1783–1861	1856	Lord Lieutenant of Devon and former Lord Steward
716	Henry John Temple, 3rd Viscount Palmerston			1784–1865	1856	(Then) Current Prime Minister
717	Abdul Medjid I, Sultan of Ottoman Empire			1823–1861	1856	First non-Christian member
718	Granville Leveson-Gower, 2nd Earl Granville			1815–1891	1857	Leader of the House of Lords
719	Richard Grosvenor, 2nd Marquess of Westminster			1795–1869	1857	Lord Lieutenant of Cheshire and former Lord Steward
720	Frederick William Nicholas Charles, Crown Prince of Prussia			1831–1888	1858	Later Frederick III, Emperor of Germany
721	Arthur Wellesley, 2nd Duke of Wellington			1807–1884	1858	Master of the Horse
722	William Cavendish, 7th Duke of Devonshire			1808–1891	1858	Lord Lieutenant of Derbyshire
723	Peter V, King of Portugal			1837–1861	1858	
724	Albert Edward, Prince of Wales			1841–1910	1858	Later Edward VII, King of the United Kingdom
725	Dudley Ryder, 2nd Earl of Harrowby			1798–1882	1859	Former Lord Privy Seal
726	Edward Smith-Stanley, 14th Earl of Derby			1799–1869	1859	Prime Minister 1852, 1858–1859, 1866–1868
727	Henry Pelham-Clinton, 5th Duke of Newcastle			1811–1864	1860	Secretary of State for the Colonies
728	William I, King of Prussia			1797–1888	1861	Later German Emperor
729	Charles Canning, 1st Earl Canning			1812–1862	1862	Viceroy of India
730	Edward Seymour, 12th Duke of Somerset			1804–1885	1862	First Lord of the Admiralty
731	John Russell, 1st Earl Russell			1792–1878	1862	Prime Minister 1846–1852, 1865–1866
732	Anthony Ashley-Cooper, 7th Earl of Shaftesbury			1801–1885	1862	Lord Lieutenant of Dorset
733	William Wentworth-Fitzwilliam, 6th Earl Fitzwilliam			1815–1902	1862	Lord Lieutenant of the West Riding of Yorkshire
734	Prince Louis of Hesse and by Rhine			1837–1892	1862	Later Louis IV, Grand Duke of Hesse
735	Frederick William, Grand Duke of Mecklenburg-Strelitz			1819–1904	1862	
736	Prince Alfred			1844–1900	1863	Later Duke of Edinburgh and of Saxe-Coburg and Gotha
737	Henry Grey, 3rd Earl Grey			1802–1894	1863	Lord Lieutenant of Northumberland and former Secretary of State for War and the Colonies
738	George Sutherland-Leveson-Gower, 3rd Duke of Sutherland			1828–1892	1864	Lord Lieutenant of Cromarty and Sutherland
739	George Brudenell-Bruce, 2nd Marquess of Ailesbury			1804–1878	1864	Master of the Horse
740	Henry Petty-Fitzmaurice, 4th Marquess of Lansdowne			1816–1866	1864	Former Under-Secretary of State for Foreign Affairs
741	John Spencer, 5th Earl Spencer			1835–1910	1865	
742	Harry Powlett, 4th Duke of Cleveland			1803–1891	1865	
743	Louis I, King of Portugal			1838–1889	1865	
744	Christian IX, King of Denmark			1818–1906	1865	
745	Louis III, Grand Duke of Hesse and by Rhine			1806–1877	1865	
746	Francis Cowper, 7th Earl Cowper			1834–1905	1865	Lord Lieutenant of Bedfordshire
747	Henry Wellesley, 1st Earl Cowley			1804–1884	1866	Ambassador to France
748	Leopold II, King of the Belgians			1835–1909	1866	
749	Prince Christian of Schleswig-Holstein			1831–1917	1866	
750	Charles Gordon-Lennox, 6th Duke of Richmond			1818–1903	1867	President of the Board of Trade
751	Charles Manners, 6th Duke of Rutland			1815–1888	1867	Lord Lieutenant of Leicestershire
752	Henry Somerset, 8th Duke of Beaufort			1824–1899	1867	Master of the Horse
753	Prince Arthur			1850–1942	1867	Later Duke of Connaught and Strathearn
754	Franz Joseph, Emperor of Austria			1830–1916	1867	Appointment annulled 1915
755	Alexander II, Emperor and Autocrat of all the Russias			1818–1881	1867	
756	Abdul Aziz, Sultan of Ottoman Empire			1830–1876	1867	
757	John Spencer-Churchill, 7th Duke of Marlborough			1822–1883	1868	Lord President of the Council
758	Prince Leopold			1853–1884	1869	Later Duke of Albany
759	Stratford Canning, 1st Viscount Stratford de Redcliffe			1786–1880	1869	Former Ambassador to the Ottoman Empire
760	George Robinson, 3rd Earl de Grey			1827–1909	1869	Later Marquess of Ripon; Viceroy of India
761	Hugh Grosvenor, 3rd Marquess of Westminster			1825–1899	1870	Later Duke of Westminster
762	Peter II, Emperor of Brazil			1825–1891	1871	First non-European member
763	Thomas Dundas, 2nd Earl of Zetland			1795–1873	1872	Lord Lieutenant of the North Riding of Yorkshire
764	Naser al-Din, Shah of Persia			1831–1896	1873	
765	Thomas Coke, 2nd Earl of Leicester			1822–1909	1873	Lord-Lieutenant of Norfolk
766	George I, King of the Hellenes			1845–1913	1876	
767	Prince Wilhelm of Prussia			1859–1941	1877	Later Wilhelm II, Emperor of Germany; Appointment annulled 1915
768	Umberto, King of Italy			1844–1900	1878	
769	Ernst August of Hanover, 3rd Duke of Cumberland and Teviotdale			1845–1923	1878	Appointment annulled 1915
770	Benjamin Disraeli, 1st Earl of Beaconsfield			1804–1881	1878	(Then) Current Prime Minister
771	Robert Gascoyne-Cecil, 3rd Marquess of Salisbury			1830–1903	1878	Prime Minister 1885–1886, 1886–1892, 1895–1902
772	Francis Russell, 9th Duke of Bedford			1819–1891	1880	
773	Alexander III, Emperor and Autocrat of all the Russias			1845–1894	1881	
774	Oscar II, King of Sweden and Norway			1829–1907	1881	
775	Alfonso XII, King of Spain			1857–1885	1881	
776	Albert, King of Saxony			1828–1902	1882	
777	William III, King of the Netherlands			1817–1890	1882	
778	Augustus FitzRoy, 7th Duke of Grafton			1821–1918	1883	
779	Prince Albert Victor of Wales			1864–1892	1883	Later Duke of Clarence and Avondale
780	George Campbell, 8th Duke of Argyll			1823–1900	1884	Lord Lieutenant of Argyllshire and former Lord Privy Seal
781	Edward Stanley, 15th Earl of Derby			1826–1893	1884	Secretary of State for the Colonies
782	Prince George of Wales			1865–1936	1884	Later Prince of Wales; George V, King of the United Kingdom.
783	John Wodehouse, 1st Earl of Kimberley			1826–1902	1885	Secretary of State for India
784	William Compton, 4th Marquess of Northampton			1818–1897	1885	
785	William Molyneux, 4th Earl of Sefton			1835–1897	1885	Lord Lieutenant of Lancashire
786	Prince Henry of Battenberg			1858–1896	1885	
787	Algernon Percy, 6th Duke of Northumberland			1810–1899	1886	Lord Lieutenant of Northumberland and former Lord Privy Seal
788	William Nevill, 1st Marquess of Abergavenny			1826–1915	1886	
789	Henry Fitzalan-Howard, 15th Duke of Norfolk			1847–1917	1886	Earl Marshal
790	Rudolf, Crown Prince of Austria			1858–1889	1887	
791	Charles Vane-Tempest-Stewart, 6th Marquess of Londonderry			1852–1915	1888	Lord Lieutenant of Ireland
792	Prince Henry of Prussia			1862–1929	1889	Appointment annulled 1915
793	Charles I, King of Württemberg			1823–1891	1890	
794	Victor Emmanuel, Prince of Naples			1869–1947	1891	Later Victor Emmanuel III, King of Italy. Appointment annulled 1941.
795	John Manners, 7th Duke of Rutland			1818–1906	1891	Chancellor of the Duchy of Lancaster
796	George Cadogan, 5th Earl Cadogan			1840–1915	1891	Lord Privy Seal
797	Ernest Ludwig, Hereditary Grand Duke of Hesse			1868–1937	1892	Later Grand Duke of Hesse; Appointment annulled 1915
798	Carol I, King of Romania			1839–1914	1892	
799	Spencer Cavendish, 8th Duke of Devonshire			1833–1908	1892	Former Secretary of State for War
800	James Hamilton, 2nd Duke of Abercorn			1838–1913	1892	Lord Lieutenant of Donegal
801	Archibald Primrose, 5th Earl of Rosebery			1847–1929	1892	Prime Minister 1894–1895; Knight of the Thistle
802	Grand Duke; Nicholas Alexandrovich of Russia			1868–1918	1893	Later Nicholas II, Emperor and Autocrat of all the Russias.
803	Gavin Campbell, 1st Marquess of Breadalbane			1851–1922	1894	Lord Steward of the Household
804	Prince Alfred of Edinburgh, Hereditary Prince of Saxe-Coburg and Gotha			1874–1899	1894	
805	Henry Petty-Fitzmaurice, 5th Marquess of Lansdowne			1845–1927	1895	Viceroy of India
806	Charles I, King of Portugal			1863–1908	1895	
807	Crown Prince; Frederik of Denmark			1843–1912	1896	Later Frederik VIII, King of Denmark
808	Frederick Stanley, 16th Earl of Derby			1841–1908	1897	Former Governor General of Canada
809	William Montagu Douglas Scott, 6th Duke of Buccleuch			1831–1914	1897	Lord Lieutenant of Dumfries
810	Victor Bruce, 9th Earl of Elgin			1849–1917	1899	Viceroy of India
811	Henry Percy, 7th Duke of Northumberland			1846–1918	1899	Former Treasurer of the Household
812	William Cavendish-Bentinck, 6th Duke of Portland			1857–1943	1900	Master of the Horse

== Edward VII ==
Edward VII (1901–1910)
N°	Name	Image	Arms	Life	Date	Notes
S27	King Edward VII			1841–1910	1901	Became sovereign of the order upon accession to the throne. Previously an ex officio member as Prince of Wales.
L1	Queen Alexandra			1844–1925	1901	First Royal Lady
813	Frederick Sleigh Roberts, 1st Baron Roberts			1832–1914	1901	Later Earl Roberts
814	Wilhelm, German Crown Prince			1882–1951	1901	Appointment annulled 1915
815	Alfonso XIII, King of Spain			1886–1941	1902	
816	Herbrand Russell, 11th Duke of Bedford			1858–1940	1902	Lord Lieutenant of Middlesex
817	Charles Spencer-Churchill, 9th Duke of Marlborough			1871–1934	1902	Lord High Steward
818	Grand Duke Michael Alexandrovich of Russia			1878–1918	1902	
819	Archduke Franz Ferdinand of Austria			1863–1914	1902	
820	Prince Emanuele Filiberto, Duke of Aosta			1869–1931	1902	
821	Luís Filipe, Prince Royal of Portugal			1887–1908	1902	
822	Prince Charles Edward, Duke of Albany, Duke of Saxe-Coburg and Gotha			1884–1954	1902	Appointment annulled 1915
823	Prince Arthur of Connaught			1883–1938	1902	Governor-General of South Africa
824	Arthur Wellesley, 4th Duke of Wellington			1849–1934	1902	
825	Cromartie Sutherland-Leveson-Gower, 4th Duke of Sutherland			1851–1913	1902	Lord Lieutenant of Sutherland
826	Muzaffir al-Din, Shah of Persia			1853–1907	1903	
827	Wilhelm II, King of Württemberg			1848–1921	1904	Appointment annulled 1915
828	Gustav, Crown Prince of Sweden			1858–1950	1905	Later Gustav V, King of Sweden
829	Charles Gordon-Lennox, 7th Duke of Richmond			1845–1928	1905	Lord Lieutenant of Elginshire and Banffshire
830	Mutsuhito, Emperor of Japan			1852–1912	1906	
831	Frederick I, Grand Duke of Baden			1826–1907	1906	
832	Charles Wynn-Carington, 1st Earl Carrington			1843–1928	1906	Former Lord Chamberlain, later Marquess of Lincolnshire
833	Haakon VII, King of Norway			1872–1957	1906	
834	Robert Offley Ashburton Crewe-Milnes, 1st Earl of Crewe			1858–1945	1908	Later Marquess of Crewe
835	William Compton, 5th Marquess of Northampton			1851–1913	1908	
836	John Lambton, 3rd Earl of Durham			1855–1928	1909	Lord Lieutenant of Durham
837	William Palmer, 2nd Earl of Selborne			1859–1942	1909	High Commissioner for Southern Africa
838	Manuel II, King of Portugal			1889–1932	1909	

== George V ==
George V (1910–1936)
N°	Name	Image	Arms	Life	Date	Notes
S28	King George V			1865–1936	1910	Became sovereign of the order upon accession to the throne. Previously a royal knight companion and ex officio member as Prince of Wales.
L2	Queen Mary			1867–1953	1910	Consort of George V
839	Gilbert Elliot-Murray-Kynynmound, 4th Earl of Minto			1845–1914	1910	Governor-General of Canada; Viceroy of India
840	Luitpold, Prince Regent of Bavaria			1821–1912	1911	
841	Edward, Prince of Wales			1894–1972	1911	Later Edward VIII, King of the United Kingdom, abdicated, then the Duke of Windsor
842	Adolf Frederick V, Grand Duke of Mecklenburg-Strelitz			1848–1914	1911	
843	John Campbell, 9th Duke of Argyll			1845–1914	1911	Lord Lieutenant of Argyllshire
844	Alexander Duff, 1st Duke of Fife			1849–1912	1911	Lord Lieutenant of the County of London
845	Yoshihito, Emperor of Japan			1879–1926	1912	
846	Sir Edward Grey, 3rd Bt			1862–1933	1912	Later Viscount Grey of Fallodon
847	Charles Spencer, 6th Earl Spencer			1857–1922	1913	Former Lord Chamberlain
848	Christian X, King of Denmark			1870–1947	1914	
849	William Lygon, 7th Earl Beauchamp			1872–1938	1914	Lord President of the Council
850	Albert I, King of the Belgians			1875–1934	1914	
851	Edward Stanley, 17th Earl of Derby			1865–1948	1915	Former Postmaster General
852	Edwyn Scudamore-Stanhope, 10th Earl of Chesterfield			1854–1933	1915	Lord Steward of the Household
853	Herbert Kitchener, 1st Earl Kitchener			1850–1916	1915	Secretary of State for War
854	George Curzon, 1st Earl Curzon of Kedleston			1859–1925	1916	Later Marquess Curzon of Kedleston; Viceroy of India
855	Victor Cavendish, 9th Duke of Devonshire			1868–1938	1916	Governor General of Canada
856	Charles Hardinge, 1st Baron Hardinge of Penshurst			1858–1944	1916	Viceroy of India
857	Prince Albert			1895–1952	1916	Later Duke of York; George VI, King of the United Kingdom
858	James Gascoyne-Cecil, 4th Marquess of Salisbury			1861–1947	1917	Former Lord Keeper of the Privy Seal
859	Thomas Thynne, 5th Marquess of Bath			1862–1946	1917	Lord Lieutenant of Somerset
860	Henry Manners, 8th Duke of Rutland			1852–1925	1918	Lord Lieutenant of Leicestershire
861	Charles Vane-Tempest-Stewart, 7th Marquess of Londonderry			1878–1949	1919	Lord Lieutenant of Down
862	Alfred Milner, 1st Viscount Milner			1854–1925	1921	Secretary of State for the Colonies
863	Prince Henry			1900–1974	1921	Later Duke of Gloucester
864	Henry Lascelles, Viscount Lascelles			1882–1947	1922	Later Earl of Harewood
865	Arthur Balfour			1848–1930	1922	Later Earl of Balfour; Prime Minister 1902–1905
866	Prince George			1902–1942	1923	Later Duke of Kent
867	Ferdinand, King of Romania			1865–1927	1924	
868	Edmund FitzAlan-Howard, 1st Viscount FitzAlan of Derwent			1855–1947	1925	Former Lord Lieutenant of Ireland
869	Alan Percy, 8th Duke of Northumberland			1880–1930	1925	Lord Lieutenant of Northumberland
870	H. H. Asquith, 1st Earl of Oxford and Asquith			1852–1928	1925	Prime Minister 1908–1916
871	Sir Austen Chamberlain			1863–1937	1925	Foreign Secretary
872	Alexander Cambridge, 1st Earl of Athlone			1874–1957	1928	Governor-General of South Africa; Governor-General of Canada
873	James Hamilton, 3rd Duke of Abercorn			1869–1953	1928	Governor of Northern Ireland
874	William Grenfell, 1st Baron Desborough			1855–1945	1928	
875	Hugh Lowther, 5th Earl of Lonsdale			1857–1944	1928	Lord Lieutenant of Cumberland
876	Hirohito, Emperor of Japan			1901–1989	1929	Degraded 1941; Restored 1971
877	Aldred Lumley, 10th Earl of Scarbrough			1857–1945	1929	Colonel of The Yorkshire Dragoons (Queen's Own)
878	E. F. L. Wood, 1st Baron Irwin			1881–1959	1931	Later Earl of Halifax; Viceroy of India
879	Victor Bulwer-Lytton, 2nd Earl of Lytton			1876–1947	1933	Former Viceroy of India
880	James Stanhope, 7th Earl Stanhope			1880–1967	1934	Under-Secretary of State for Foreign Affairs
881	Charles Pelham, 4th Earl of Yarborough			1859–1936	1935	Lord-Lieutenant of Lincolnshire
882	Leopold III, King of the Belgians			1901–1983	1935	King of the Belgians 1934–1951

== Edward VIII ==
Edward VIII (1936)
N°	Name	Image	Arms	Life	Date	Notes
	Edward VIII admitted no-one to the Order during his reign					

== George VI ==
George VI (1936–1952)
N°	Name	Image	Arms	Life	Date	Notes
S30	King George VI			1895–1952	1936	Became sovereign of the order upon accession to the throne. Previously a royal knight companion of the order.
L3	Queen Elizabeth			1900–2002	1936	Later Queen Elizabeth, the Queen Mother
883	George Villiers, 6th Earl of Clarendon			1877–1955	1937	Governor-General of South Africa
884	Bernard Fitzalan-Howard, 16th Duke of Norfolk			1908–1975	1937	Earl Marshal
885	William Cecil, 5th Marquess of Exeter			1876–1956	1937	Lord Lieutenant of Northamptonshire
886	Claude Bowes-Lyon, 14th Earl of Strathmore and Kinghorne			1855–1944	1937	Former Lord Lieutenant of Angus, father-in-law of George VI
887	Henry Somerset, 10th Duke of Beaufort			1900–1984	1937	Master of the Horse
888	Stanley Baldwin			1867–1947	1937	Later Earl Baldwin of Bewdley; Prime Minister 1923–1924, 1924–1929, 1935–1937
889	George II, King of the Hellenes			1890–1947	1938	King of the Hellenes 1922–1924, 1935–1947
890	Carol II, King of Romania			1893–1953	1938	King of the Romanians 1930–1940
891	Prince Paul of Yugoslavia			1893–1976	1939	Prince Regent 1934–1941
892	Edward Cavendish, 10th Duke of Devonshire			1895–1950	1942	Lord Lieutenant of Derbyshire
893	Lawrence Dundas, 2nd Marquess of Zetland			1876–1961	1942	Former Secretary of State for India and Burma
894	Victor Hope, 2nd Marquess of Linlithgow			1887–1952	1943	Viceroy of India
L4	Wilhelmina, Queen of the Netherlands			1880–1962	1944	Queen of the Netherlands 1890–1948
895	Christopher Addison, 1st Viscount Addison			1869–1951	1946	Leader of the House of Lords
896	Robert Gascoyne-Cecil, Viscount Cranborne			1893–1972	1946	Succeeded as Baron Cecil, later Marquess of Salisbury
897	Louis Mountbatten, 1st Viscount Mountbatten of Burma			1900–1979	1946	Later Earl Mountbatten of Burma; Viceroy of India
898	Alan Brooke, 1st Viscount Alanbrooke			1883–1963	1946	Chief of the Imperial General Staff
899	Charles Portal, 1st Viscount Portal of Hungerford			1893–1971	1946	Chief of the Air Staff
900	Harold Alexander, 1st Viscount Alexander of Tunis			1891–1969	1946	Later Earl Alexander of Tunis
901	Bernard Montgomery, 1st Viscount Montgomery of Alamein			1887–1976	1946	Chief of the Imperial General Staff
L5	Princess Elizabeth			1926–2022	1947	Later Duchess of Edinburgh; Elizabeth II, Queen of the United Kingdom
902	Philip Mountbatten			1921–2021	1947	Later Prince Philip, Duke of Edinburgh
903	William Cavendish-Bentinck, 7th Duke of Portland			1893–1977	1948	Lord Lieutenant of Nottinghamshire
904	William Ormsby-Gore, 4th Baron Harlech			1885–1964	1948	Lord Lieutenant of Merionethshire and former Secretary of State for the Colonies
905	Roger Lumley, 11th Earl of Scarbrough			1896–1969	1948	Lord Lieutenant of the West Riding of Yorkshire and former Governor of Bombay
906	Bertram Gurdon, 2nd Baron Cranworth			1877–1964	1948	Honorary Colonel of the 358th (Suffolk) Medium Regiment
907	Gerald Wellesley, 7th Duke of Wellington			1885–1972	1951	Lord Lieutenant of Hampshire
908	Hugh Fortescue, 5th Earl Fortescue			1888–1958	1951	Lord Lieutenant of Devon
909	Wentworth Beaumont, 2nd Viscount Allendale			1890–1956	1951	Lord Lieutenant of Northumberland
910	Frederik IX, King of Denmark			1899–1972	1951	

== Elizabeth II ==
Elizabeth II (1952–2022)
N°	Name	Image	Arms	Life	Date	Notes
S31	Queen Elizabeth II			1926–2022	1952	Became sovereign of the order upon accession to the throne. Previously a royal lady of the order.
911	William Leveson-Gower, 4th Earl Granville			1880–1953	1952	Governor of Northern Ireland
912	Winston Churchill			1874–1965	1953	Prime Minister 1940–1945, 1951–1955
913	Gustaf VI Adolf, King of Sweden			1882–1973	1954	
914	Haile Selassie, Emperor of Ethiopia			1892–1975	1954	
915	Anthony Eden			1897–1977	1954	Prime Minister 1955–1957; Later Earl of Avon
916	Rupert Guinness, 2nd Earl of Iveagh			1874–1967	1955	Chancellor of the University of Dublin
917	Clement Attlee, 1st Earl Attlee			1883–1967	1956	Prime Minister 1945–1951
918	Hastings Ismay, 1st Baron Ismay			1887–1965	1957	Secretary General of NATO
919	Michael Willoughby, 11th Baron Middleton			1887–1970	1957	Lord Lieutenant of the East Riding of Yorkshire
L6	Juliana, Queen of the Netherlands			1909–2004	1958	Queen of the Netherlands 1948–1980
920	Charles, Prince of Wales			born 1948	1958	Later Charles III, King of the United Kingdom
921	Field Marshal; Sir William Slim			1891–1970	1959	Later Viscount Slim
922	Hugh Percy, 10th Duke of Northumberland			1914–1988	1959	Lord Lieutenant of Northumberland
923	Olav V, King of Norway			1903–1991	1959	
924	William Pleydell-Bouverie, 7th Earl of Radnor			1895–1968	1960	Lord Warden of the Stannaries
925	Edward Digby, 11th Baron Digby			1894–1964	1960	Lord Lieutenant of Dorset
926	John Loder, 2nd Baron Wakehurst			1895–1970	1962	Governor of Northern Ireland
927	Baudouin, King of the Belgians			1930–1993	1963	
928	Paul, King of the Hellenes			1901–1964	1963	
929	Field Marshal; Sir Gerald Templer			1898–1979	1963	Former Chief of the Imperial General Staff
930	A. V. Alexander, 1st Earl Alexander of Hillsborough			1885–1965	1964	Former First Lord of the Admiralty
931	Charles Lyttelton, 10th Viscount Cobham			1909–1977	1964	Governor-General of New Zealand 1957–1962
932	Basil Brooke, 1st Viscount Brookeborough			1888–1973	1965	Lord Lieutenant of Fermanagh and former Prime Minister of Northern Ireland
933	Edward Bridges, 1st Baron Bridges			1892–1969	1965	Former Cabinet Secretary
934	Derick Heathcoat-Amory, 1st Viscount Amory			1899–1981	1968	Former Chancellor of the Exchequer
935	William Sidney, 1st Viscount De L'Isle			1909–1991	1968	Former Governor-General of Australia
936	Richard Casey, Baron Casey			1890–1976	1969	Governor-General of Australia
937	Alexander Baring, 6th Baron Ashburton			1898–1991	1969	Lord Lieutenant of Hampshire
938	Oliver Lyttelton, 1st Viscount Chandos			1893–1972	1970	Former Secretary of State for the Colonies
939	Cameron Cobbold, 1st Baron Cobbold			1904–1987	1970	Former Lord Chamberlain
940	Sir Edmund Bacon, 13th Baronet			1903–1982	1970	Lord Lieutenant of Norfolk
941	Cennydd Traherne			1910–1995	1970	Lord Lieutenant of Glamorgan
942	Geoffrey Waldegrave, 12th Earl Waldegrave			1905–1995	1971	Lord Warden of the Stannaries
943	Frank Pakenham, 7th Earl of Longford			1905–2001	1971	Former Leader of the House of Lords
944	R.A. Butler, Baron Butler of Saffron Walden			1902–1982	1971	Former Foreign Secretary
945	Hervey Rhodes, Baron Rhodes			1895–1987	1972	Former Lord Lieutenant of Lancashire
946	Evelyn Baring, 1st Baron Howick of Glendale			1903–1973	1972	Former Governor of Kenya
947	Charles Moore, 11th Earl of Drogheda			1910–1989	1972	
948	Jean, Grand Duke of Luxembourg			1921–2019	1972	Grand Duke of Luxembourg 1964–2000
949	Edward Shackleton, Baron Shackleton			1911–1994	1974	Former Leader of the House of Lords
950	Humphrey Trevelyan, Baron Trevelyan			1905–1985	1974	Former Ambassador to Egypt, Iraq, and the Soviet Union
951	John Nevill, 5th Marquess of Abergavenny			1914–2000	1974	Lord Lieutenant of East Sussex
952	Harold Wilson			1916–1995	1976	Prime Minister 1964–1970, 1974–1976; Later Baron Wilson of Rievaulx
953	Hugh FitzRoy, 11th Duke of Grafton			1919–2011	1976	
954	Rowland Baring, 3rd Earl of Cromer			1918–1991	1977	Governor of the Bank of England
955	Charles Elworthy, Baron Elworthy			1911–1993	1977	Lord Lieutenant of Greater London and former Chief of the Defence Staff
956	John Hunt, Baron Hunt			1910–1998	1979	Leader of the 1953 British Mount Everest expedition
957	Sir Paul Hasluck			1905–1993	1979	Former Governor-General of Australia
L7	Margrethe II, Queen of Denmark			born 1940	1979	Queen of Denmark 1972–2024
958	Sir Keith Holyoake			1904–1983	1980	Prime Minister of New Zealand 1960–1972; Governor-General of New Zealand 1977–1980
959	Field Marshal; Sir Richard Hull			1907–1989	1980	Lord Lieutenant of Devon and former Chief of the Defence Staff
960	Miles Fitzalan-Howard, 17th Duke of Norfolk			1915–2002	1983	Earl Marshal
961	Admiral of the Fleet; Terence Lewin, Baron Lewin			1920–1999	1983	Former Chief of the Defence Staff
962	Gordon Richardson, Baron Richardson of Duntisbourne			1915–2010	1983	Governor of the Bank of England
963	Carl XVI Gustaf, King of Sweden			born 1946	1983	
964	Oswald Phipps, 4th Marquess of Normanby			1912–1994	1985	Lord Lieutenant of North Yorkshire
965	Peter Carington, 6th Baron Carrington			1919–2018	1985	Secretary-General of NATO 1984–1988
966	Prince Edward, Duke of Kent			born 1935	1985	
967	James Callaghan, Baron Callaghan of Cardiff			1912–2005	1987	Prime Minister 1976–1979
968	Philip Lever, 3rd Viscount Leverhulme			1915–2000	1988	Lord Lieutenant of Cheshire
969	Quintin Hogg, Baron Hailsham of St Marylebone			1907–2001	1988	Former Lord Chancellor
970	Juan Carlos I, King of Spain			born 1938	1988	King of Spain 1975–2014
L8	Beatrix, Queen of the Netherlands			born 1938	1989	Queen of the Netherlands 1980–2013
971	Lavinia Fitzalan-Howard, Duchess of Norfolk			1916–1995	1990	First non-royal Lady Companion
972	Valerian Wellesley, 8th Duke of Wellington			1915–2014	1990	Colonel-in-Chief of the Duke of Wellington's Regiment
973	Edwin Bramall, Baron Bramall			1923–2019	1990	Former Chief of Defence Staff and Lord Lieutenant of Greater London
974	Edward Heath			1916–2005	1992	Prime Minister 1970–1974
975	Matthew White Ridley, 4th Viscount Ridley			1925–2012	1992	Lord Steward of the Household and Lord Lieutenant of Northumberland
976	John Sainsbury, Baron Sainsbury of Preston Candover			1927–2022	1992	Businessman and philanthropist
L9	Anne, Princess Royal			born 1950	1994	(post-nominal letters KG)
977	John Baring, 7th Baron Ashburton			1928–2020	1994	Banker and businessman
978	Robin Leigh-Pemberton, Baron Kingsdown			1927–2013	1994	Governor of the Bank of England and Lord Lieutenant of Kent
979	Sir Ninian Stephen			1923–2017	1994	Former Governor-General of Australia and judge
980	Margaret Thatcher, Baroness Thatcher			1925–2013	1995	Prime Minister 1979–1990
981	Sir Edmund Hillary			1919–2008	1995	Mountaineer
982	Andrew Cavendish, 11th Duke of Devonshire			1920–2004	1996	Former Minister of State for Commonwealth Relations
983	Timothy Colman			1929–2021	1996	Businessman, yachtsman and former Lord Lieutenant of Norfolk
984	Prince Richard, Duke of Gloucester			born 1944	1997	
985	Emperor Akihito of Japan			born 1933	1998	Emperor of Japan 1989–2019
986	James Hamilton, 5th Duke of Abercorn			born 1934	1999	Former Lord Steward of the Household
987	Sir William Gladstone, 7th Baronet			1925–2018	1999	Former Chief Scout of the United Kingdom
988	Peter Inge, Baron Inge			1935–2022	2001	Former Chief of Defence Staff and Constable of the Tower of London
989	Sir Antony Acland			1930–2021	2001	Former Ambassador, Permanent Secretary to the FCO and Head of the Diplomatic Service
990	Harald V, King of Norway			1937–2026	2001	
L10	Princess Alexandra, The Honourable Lady Ogilvy			born 1936	2003	(post-nominal letters KG)
991	Gerald Grosvenor, 6th Duke of Westminster			1951–2016	2003	Landowner and Territorial Army Officer
992	Robin Butler, Baron Butler of Brockwell			born 1938	2003	Former Cabinet Secretary and Head of the Civil Service
993	John Morris, Baron Morris of Aberavon			1931–2023	2003	Former Attorney-General and Secretary of State for Wales
994	John Major			born 1943	2005	Prime Minister 1990–1997
995	Thomas Bingham, Baron Bingham of Cornhill			1933–2010	2005	Senior Lord of Appeal in Ordinary and Lord Chief Justice
996	Mary Soames, Baroness Soames			1922–2014	2005	Daughter of Winston Churchill
997	Prince Andrew, Duke of York			born 1960	2006	Later Andrew Mountbatten-Windsor; Appointment annulled 2025
998	Prince Edward, Earl of Wessex			born 1964	2006	Created Duke of Edinburgh on 10 March 2023
999	Richard Luce, Baron Luce			born 1936	2008	Former Lord Chamberlain and Governor of Gibraltar
1000	Prince William of Wales			born 1982	2008	Created Duke of Cambridge 26 May 2011; Created Prince of Wales 9 September 2022
1001	Sir Thomas Dunne			1933–2025	2008	Former Lord Lieutenant of Herefordshire and of Worcestershire
1002	Nicholas Phillips, Baron Phillips of Worth Matravers			born 1938	2011	Former Lord Chief Justice and President of the Supreme Court
1003	Michael Boyce, Baron Boyce			1943–2022	2011	Former Chief of Defence Staff
1004	Graham Stirrup, Baron Stirrup			born 1949	2013	Former Chief of Defence Staff
1005	Eliza Manningham-Buller, Baroness Manningham-Buller			born 1948	2014	Former Director-General of MI5
1006	Mervyn King, Baron King of Lothbury			born 1948	2014	Governor of the Bank of England 2003–2013
1007	Charles Kay-Shuttleworth, 5th Baron Shuttleworth			born 1948	2016	Lord Lieutenant of Lancashire
1008	Sir David Brewer			1940–2023	2016	Lord Lieutenant of Greater London and former Lord Mayor of London
1009	Felipe VI, King of Spain			born 1968	2017	
1010	Alan Brooke, 3rd Viscount Brookeborough			born 1952	2018	Personal Lord in Waiting to The Queen and Lord Lieutenant of Fermanagh
1011	Dame Mary Fagan			born 1939	2018	Former Lord Lieutenant of Hampshire
1012	Willem-Alexander, King of the Netherlands			born 1967	2018	
1013	Robert Gascoyne-Cecil, 7th Marquess of Salisbury			born 1946	2019	Former Leader of the House of Lords
1014	Dame Mary Peters			born 1939	2019	Former Lord Lieutenant of Belfast
L11	Camilla, Duchess of Cornwall			born 1947	2022	Later Queen of the United Kingdom
1015	Valerie Amos, Baroness Amos			born 1954	2022	Former Leader of the House of Lords
1016	Tony Blair			born 1953	2022	Prime Minister 1997–2007

== Charles III ==
Charles III (2022–)
N°	Name	Image	Arms	Life	Date	Notes
S32	King Charles III			born 1948	2022	Became sovereign of the order upon accession to the throne. Previously an ex officio member as Prince of Wales.
1017	Catherine Ashton, Baroness Ashton of Upholland			born 1956	2023	Former EU High Representative of the Union for Foreign Affairs and Security Policy; First Vice President of the European Commission; 2009–2014.
1018	Chris Patten, Baron Patten of Barnes			born 1944	2023	Governor of Hong Kong; 1992–1997
L12	Birgitte, Duchess of Gloucester			born 1946	2024	
1019	Stuart Peach, Baron Peach			born 1956	2024	Chief of the Defence Staff; 2016–2018; Chair of the NATO Military Committee; 2018–2021
1020	Ajay Kakkar, Baron Kakkar			born 1964	2024	Chairman of the House of Lords; Appointments Commission; 2013–2018
1021	Andrew Lloyd Webber, Baron Lloyd-Webber			born 1948	2024	Composer
1022	Naruhito, Emperor of Japan			born 1960	2024	
1023	Peter Hennessy, Baron Hennessy of Nympsfield			born 1947	2026	Historian
1024	Gus O'Donnell, Baron O'Donnell			born 1952	2026	Cabinet Secretary; 2005–2011
1025	Ian Burnett, Baron Burnett of Maldon			born 1958	2026	Lord Chief Justice of England and Wales; 2017–2023

== See also ==
- List of current knights and ladies of the Garter
- List of knights and ladies of the Thistle
- List of knights of St Patrick
- List of knights and dames grand cross of the Order of the Bath
- List of knights and dames grand cross of the Order of St Michael and St George
- List of knights grand cross of the Order of the British Empire
- Order of the Garter
- St George's Chapel, Windsor Castle
- The Society of the Friends of St George's and Descendants of the Knights of the Garter
- Windsor Castle
