= List of current knights and ladies of the Garter =

The Most Noble Order of the Garter is a British order of chivalry. It is the world's oldest national order of knighthood in continuous existence and the pinnacle of the British honours system (after the Victoria Cross and George Cross). Its membership is extremely limited, consisting of the Sovereign, the Prince of Wales—both being members ex officio and gaining membership upon acceding to one of the titles if not already held—and not more than 24 full members known as Companions. Male members are known as Knights Companion, whilst female members are known as Ladies Companion. The Order can also include supernumerary members (members of the British royal family and foreign monarchs), known as "Royal" and "Stranger" Knights and Ladies (Companion), respectively. The Sovereign alone grants membership to the Order, meaning that ministerial advice is not sought.

== Sovereign ==
Name	Year of appointment	Present age	Banner
King Charles III (ex officio)	1958 as Prince of Wales; Sovereign since 2022	78	

== Royal Knights and Ladies (Companion) ==
Name	Year of appointment	Present age	Banner	Notes
Prince Edward, Duke of Kent	1985	91		
Anne, Princess Royal	1994	76		Royal Knight Companion
Prince Richard, Duke of Gloucester	1997	82		
Princess Alexandra, The Honourable Lady Ogilvy	2003	89		Royal Knight Companion
Prince Edward, Duke of Edinburgh	2006	62		
William, Prince of Wales (ex officio)	2008; Prince of Wales since 2022	44		1000th Knight of the Garter
Queen Camilla	2022	79		Royal Lady
Birgitte, Duchess of Gloucester	2024	80		Royal Lady Companion

== Stranger Knights and Ladies Companion ==
Name	Year of appointment	Present age	Banner	Notes
Margrethe II, former queen of Denmark	1979	86		Also recipient of the Royal Victorian Chain; on the occasion of the state visit by Elizabeth II to Denmark
Carl XVI Gustaf, King of Sweden	1983	80		Also recipient of the Royal Victorian Chain and Honorary Admiral in the Royal Navy; on the occasion of the state visit by Elizabeth II to Sweden
Juan Carlos I, former king of Spain	1988	88		Also recipient of the Royal Victorian Chain; on the occasion of the state visit by Elizabeth II to Spain
Princess Beatrix of the Netherlands	1989	88		Also recipient of the Royal Victorian Chain and Honorary Dame Grand Cross of the Royal Victorian Order
Akihito, Emperor Emeritus of Japan	1998	92		Also Honorary Knight Grand Cross of the Royal Victorian Order; on the occasion of his state visit to the United Kingdom
Felipe VI, King of Spain	2017	58		Also Honorary Knight Grand Cross of the Royal Victorian Order; on the occasion of his state visit to the United Kingdom
Willem-Alexander, King of the Netherlands	2018	59		On the occasion of his state visit to the United Kingdom
Naruhito, Emperor of Japan	2024	66		On the occasion of his state visit to the United Kingdom

== Knights and Ladies Companion ==
Member number (Note: The number shown in brackets is the individual's place in the wider order of appointment since the Order's inception.)	Name	Year of appointment	Present age	Banner	Known for
1-(986)	James Hamilton, 5th Duke of Abercorn	1999	92		Lord Steward and Lord Lieutenant of Tyrone
2-(992)	Robin Butler, Baron Butler of Brockwell	2003	88		Cabinet Secretary and Head of the Home Civil Service
3-(994)	Sir John Major	2005	83		Prime Minister
4-(999)	Richard Luce, Baron Luce	2008	90		Lord Chamberlain and Governor of Gibraltar
5-(1002)	Nick Phillips, Baron Phillips of Worth Matravers	2011	88		Lord Chief Justice and President of the Supreme Court
6-(1004)	Marshal of the Royal Air Force Jock Stirrup, Baron Stirrup	2013	76		Chief of the Defence Staff
7-(1005)	Eliza Manningham-Buller, Baroness Manningham-Buller	2014	78		Director General of the Security Service
8-(1006)	Mervyn King, Baron King of Lothbury	2014	78		Governor of the Bank of England
9-(1007)	Charles Kay-Shuttleworth, 5th Baron Shuttleworth	2016	78		Lord Lieutenant of Lancashire
10-(1010)	Alan Brooke, 3rd Viscount Brookeborough	2018	74		Lord in Waiting to the monarch and Lord Lieutenant of Fermanagh
11-(1011)	Lady Mary Fagan	2018	87		Lord Lieutenant of Hampshire
12-(1013)	Robert Gascoyne-Cecil, 7th Marquess of Salisbury	2019	80		Deputy Lieutenant of Hertfordshire and Leader of the House of Lords
13-(1014)	Lady Mary Peters	2019	87		Olympic gold medallist and Lord Lieutenant of Belfast
14-(1015)	Valerie Amos, Baroness Amos	2022	72		United Nations; Under-Secretary-General for Humanitarian Affairs and Emergency Relief Coordinator, Leader of the House of Lords and Secretary of State for International Development
15-(1016)	Sir Tony Blair	2022	73		Prime Minister
16-(1017)	Catherine Ashton, Baroness Ashton of Upholland	2023	70		High Representative of the Union for Foreign Affairs and Security Policy and Leader of the House of Lords
17-(1018)	Chris Patten, Baron Patten of Barnes	2023	82		Governor of Hong Kong, Chairman of the BBC Trust, and Chancellor of the University of Oxford
18-(1019)	Air Chief Marshal Stuart Peach, Baron Peach	2024	70		Chief of the Defence Staff and Chair of the NATO Military Committee
19-(1020)	Ajay Kakkar, Baron Kakkar	2024	62		Chairman of the Judicial Appointments Commission and Chairman of the House of Lords Appointments Commission
20-(1021)	Andrew Lloyd Webber, Baron Lloyd-Webber	2024	78		Composer and impresario of musical theatre
21-(1023)	Peter Hennessy, Baron Hennessy of Nympsfield	2026	79		Historian and academic
22-(1024)	Gus O'Donnell, Baron O'Donnell	2026	74		Cabinet Secretary and Head of the Home Civil Service
23-(1025)	Ian Burnett, Baron Burnett of Maldon	2026	68		Lord Chief Justice of England and Wales and Deputy Lieutenant of Essex
24	Vacant (Note: Vacant following the death of Sir Thomas Dunne on 6 January 2025.)				

== Officers ==
- Prelate: Philip Mounstephen, Bishop of Winchester (ex officio, 2023)
- Chancellor: Eliza Manningham-Buller, Baroness Manningham-Buller LG, DCB, HonFRS, FMedSci (2024)
- Register: Christopher Cocksworth, Dean of Windsor (ex officio, 2023)
- King of Arms: James Peill, Garter Principal King of Arms (ex officio, 2026)
- Secretary: Lieutenant Colonel Stephen Segrave (2024)
- Usher: Lieutenant General Ed Davis CB, CBE, KStJ, Gentleman Usher of the Black Rod (ex officio, 2025)

== Armorial ==
Coats of arms of current Knights and Ladies of the Garter

Sovereign
Arms of Charles III

Royal Knights and Ladies (Companion)
Arms of Prince Edward, Duke of Kent	Arms of Anne, Princess Royal	Arms of Prince Richard, Duke of Gloucester
Arms of Princess Alexandra, The Honourable Lady Ogilvy	Arms of Prince Edward, Duke of Edinburgh	Arms of William, Prince of Wales
Arms of Queen Camilla	Arms of Birgitte, Duchess of Gloucester	

Stranger Knights and Ladies Companion
Arms of Margrethe II, former queen of Denmark (Note: Stranger Knights and Ladies Companion do not embellish the arms they use in their countries with British decorations.)	Arms of Carl XVI Gustaf, King of Sweden	Arms of Juan Carlos I, former king of Spain
Arms of Princess Beatrix of the Netherlands	Arms of Akihito, former emperor of Japan	Arms of Felipe VI, King of Spain
Arms of Willem-Alexander, King of the Netherlands	Arms of Naruhito, Emperor of Japan	

Knights and Ladies Companion
Arms of James Hamilton, 5th Duke of Abercorn	Arms of Robin Butler, Baron Butler of Brockwell	Arms of Sir John Major
Arms of Richard Luce, Baron Luce	Arms of Nick Phillips, Baron Phillips of Worth Matravers	Arms of Jock Stirrup, Baron Stirrup
Arms of Eliza Manningham-Buller, Baroness Manningham-Buller	Arms of Mervyn King, Baron King of Lothbury	Arms of Charles Kay-Shuttleworth, 5th Baron Shuttleworth
Arms of Lady Mary Fagan	Arms of Alan Brooke, 3rd Viscount Brookeborough	Arms of Lady Mary Peters
Arms of Robert Gascoyne-Cecil, 7th Marquess of Salisbury	Arms of Valerie Amos, Baroness Amos	Arms of Sir Tony Blair
Arms of Catherine Ashton, Baroness Ashton of Upholland	Arms of Chris Patten, Baron Patten of Barnes	Arms of Stuart Peach, Baron Peach
Arms of Ajay Kakkar, Baron Kakkar	Arms of Andrew Lloyd Webber, Baron Lloyd-Webber	Arms of Peter Hennessy, Baron Hennessy of Nympsfield
Arms of Gus O'Donnell, Baron O'Donnell	Arms of Ian Burnett, Baron Burnett of Maldon	Vacant

== See also ==
- List of knights and ladies of the Garter (a list of all the members of the Order since its inception)
