= Thomas Banastre =

English knight of the Order of the Garter

Sir Thomas Banastre
- Born: c. 1334; Bank Hall, Bretherton, Lancashire, England
- Died: 16 December 1379; Irish Sea
- Cause of death: Drowning
- Occupation: Knight
- Title: KG
- Parents: Adam Banastre (father); Joan Petronilla (mother)

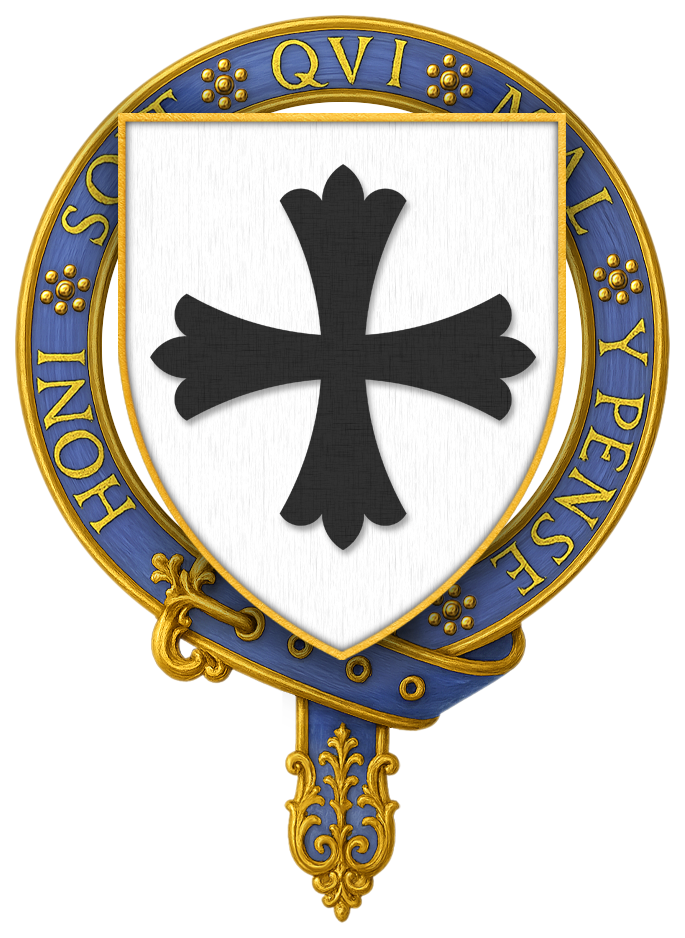
Arms of Sir Thomas Banastre, KG

Sir Thomas Banastre KG (c. 1334 – 16 December 1379) was a Knight of the Garter from England.

== Lineage ==
He was the son of Sir Adam Banastre (of Bretherton) and his wife Joan Petronilla (of Claughton) and was born at Bank Hall, Bretherton, Lancashire in 1334 and was the eldest of five children.

== Biography ==
=== Early life ===
Thomas Banastre was granted the manor of Thorp at age 11, in 1345, sold by Ralph de Thorp in Bretherton.

=== Military ===
In 1360, he was fighting in France in the campaign led by Edward III, who also knighted at Bourg-la-Reine. Thomas was in Prince Edward's Spanish campaign in 1367 and fought at the battle of Najera on 3 April 1367. During 1369, he was in Anjou and was captured by the French and was exchanged for Sire Caponnel de Caponnat, who was held by the English. During the same year, the Hamlet of Thorp was sold by the heirs of Thorp to Thomas, which became completely merged in his moiety of Bretherton, and ceased to be noticed. This added to his estate, which consisted of farms and land which provided him with his riches. He became Knight of the Garter in 1375, and became a member of the Order of the Garter after the death of Walter Paveley.

== Death ==
On 16 December 1379, Thomas Banastre was on board a fleet led by Sir John Arundel which encountered a storm in the Irish Sea, and his ship struck a rock; Thomas was drowned. Sir Hugh Calveley was aboard the same ship but survived.
