= The Society of the Friends of St George's and Descendants of the Knights of the Garter =

St George's Chapel at Windsor Castle, The Mirror of Literature, Amusement, and Instruction, 1831.

The Society of the Friends of St George's and Descendants of the Knights of the Garter is a constituent group of the Foundation of the College of St George, Windsor Castle which is a national charity in England. The society includes more than 5,100 members worldwide (including more than 900 AmFriends members of the American Friends of St George's and Descendants of the Knights of the Garter Inc.) to "protect, preserve and enhance" the college, its St George's Chapel, Windsor Castle and the chivalric knighthood, the Order of the Garter.

In addition to the many enhancement projects that the society helped fund since its creation, several major preservation projects were also completed. The ongoing project for 2009 was to clean and restore the chapel's West Window which is one of the largest in any English church with its collection of late-medieval stained-glass. The project for 2007 was to clean and repair the chapel West Front including its 16th century stonework, turrets and flying buttresses.

People interested in the society and its traditions and service may join as its members.

== History ==
A group known as the Association of the Descendants of the Knights of the Garter was founded in the 1920s, composed of knights (KG) and ladies (LG) of the order, and their descendants. Another group known as the Friends of St George's was founded in 1931 to support the college by raising funds to "protect, preserve and enhance" the chapel as the physical and spiritual center of the order. The two groups accomplished their missions separately until 1934 when they merged as The Society of the Friends of St George's with which is amalgamated the Association of the Descendants of the Knights of the Garter.

The society was founded with the mission to continue the support of the college and historic chapel. The society shares with the order its patron Saint George the Martyr, the motto Honi soit qui mal y pense (Shame be to him who thinks evil of it), and the insignia of the garter.

The society changed its name a last time in 1966 when it was designated by the Charity Commission for England and Wales as a charity. After celebrating its 75th anniversary in 2006, the society became a constituent group of the foundation in 2007 when it completed its change in corporate governance.

The American Friends of St Georges & Descendants of the Knights is a 501(c)(3) Private Nonoperating Foundation based in Glenview, Kentucky. In 2024 it claimed $198,263 in total revenue and $31,331 in total assets. Its president is Eva Strasburger.

== Officers ==
The foundation enjoys the service of its patron, the sovereign of the order, King Charles III and that of its president, the statutory knight companion of the order, William, Prince of Wales. The foundation vice presidents are the members of the order. The foundation patron and officers are assisted in their duties by its Board of Trustees.

The society members join in nominating a trustee to the foundation board, and are assisted in the society duties by its Friends' Consultative Committee.

== Membership ==
All society members support its mission with their annual, ten-year or life contributions. Every member receives:

- A copy of the society Annual Review which includes reports about the preservation work and history of the chapel and other college buildings,
- Publication of his or her name in the Society's leather-bound Book of Honour that is displayed permanently at the chapel,
- Entrance to the chapel and precincts through the Visitors' Centre during the open hours of the castle,
- Invitation to attend the society Annual General Meeting and Festival in May, the society Friends' Stand spectator seating at the royal Garter Day procession and service in June, various society teas throughout the year, various society tours of the chapel and other places of historic interest, often with privileged access, throughout the year, and, chapel services, organ recitals, choir Evensong and other concerts throughout the year.

=== Friend members ===
Every friend member is also given a personalized written Membership Certificate which bears an illumination of the patron saint and dragon known as The George, and is signed by the Dean of Windsor; and a college heraldic badge which bears the heraldic shield of St George's Cross.

=== Descendant members ===
Descendant members have also proved descent from one or more of the current or former members of the order. Every descendant member is also given a similar certificate and a descendant heraldic badge, which instead bears the heraldic shield of the founder of the order, the Plantagenet King Edward III, surmounted by a circlet crown.

== See also ==
- List of knights and ladies of the Garter
