= Philip de la Vache =

English courtier

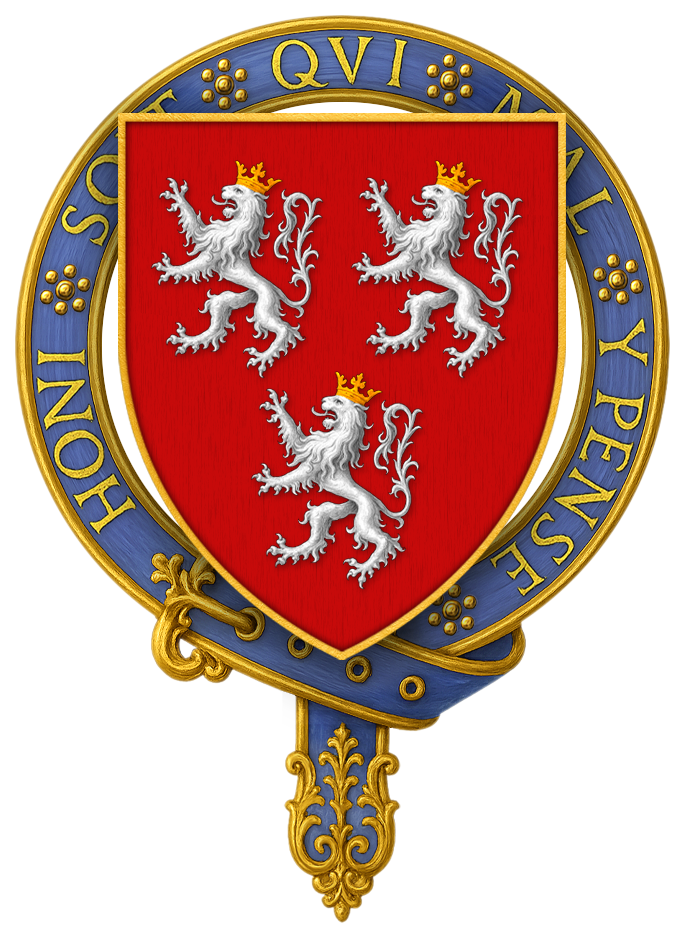
Arms of Sir Philip de la Vache, KG

Sir Philip de la Vache (c. 1348 – 1408) was an English courtier. He was the son of Sir Richard de la Vache, a well-to-do Buckinghamshire landowner who had acquired estates in Chalfont St Giles and Aston Clinton. In 1390 Philip married in Chudleigh, Devon Elizabeth Clifford, daughter of Sir Lewis Clifford KG. They had one daughter, Blanche, who went on to marry Richard Grey, 6th Baron Grey de Wilton.

He fought in the French wars and was made Knight of the Chamber in 1378. He was keeper of the royal park at Chiltern Langley and was a knight of the shire in the Parliament of 1387. On 15 May 1388 he was appointed captain of the castle of Calais and in 1390 he negotiated a truce with king of France, count of Flanders and the cities of Ghent, Bruges and Ypres. Sir Philip served in Calais until 1393, when he was transferred to Guines. During the Parliament of 1397 he was one of the pledges for the prosecution of Thomas, duke of Gloucester. He was elected Knight of the Garter in 1399, the last in the reign of Richard II.

He is generally supposed to have been the Vache referred to in Chaucer's poem Truth which says " Therfore, thou Vache, leve thine olde wrechednesse; Unto the world leve now to be thral.". It supposedly refers to a period between 1386 and 1389 when Vache was out of favour at court and had temporarily lost his positions there. His father-in-law, Sir Lewis Clifford, was a close friend of Chaucer's and Chaucer knew Sir Philip well. A country gentleman with a reputation for lavish hospitality, he may also have been the model for the Franklin in the General Prologue to "The Canterbury Tales". However, the reference to Vache in Chaucer's poem may also be a pun on his own name. The phrase Vache, leve! in the first line of the Envoy corresponds to medieval French Vache, reïs!, 'cow, leave!'. The French phase reïs, Vache!, (REISVACHE), when reversed, becomes CHAVSIER, the French form of the poet's name (this is a so-called palindrome). In the First Book of Kings in the Old Testament, the cows on their way to Beth Shemesh are likened to holy men, or monks on their way to the Heavenly Jerusalem. Chaucer may have regarded this interpretation of his name as a summons to give up his sinful life and to join the monks of Westminster Abbey.

== Bibliography ==
- George Frederick Beltz, Memorials of the most noble Order of the Garter (1841)
