= Richard de la Vache =

English knight of Buckinghamshire

Sir Richard de la Vache, KG

Sir Richard de la Vache, KG (d.1366) was an English knight of Buckinghamshire belonging to the Delavache family.

The Delavache family, often claimed to be of Gascon descent from Buckinghamshire, but were more likely Norman and the name was only found in Gascony belonging to a merchant, referenced in the Calendar Patent Roles, 1330-1334, called John del La Vacarie, with no evidence of a connection to the Buckinghamshire family.

Richard was first mentioned fighting at the Siege of Calais 1345-6. In 1347, Richard was summoned by Edward III and arrived with one man-at-arms and two archers for a new campaign in France. In 1356 he became Knight of the Garter upon the death of John de Lisle. In 1358, Richard was steward of the forest of Sherwood. In 1361 he was appointed constable of the Tower of London for life and was succeeded by Sir Alan Buxhull, a fellow Knight of the Garter. In 1362 and 1364 he received letters of safe conduct for travel to the continent, probably to participate in military campaigns.

Richard's son, Sir Philip, was also a Knight of the Garter.
