= Mary Fagan =

British public official

Lady Mary Fagan LG DCVO DStJ JP
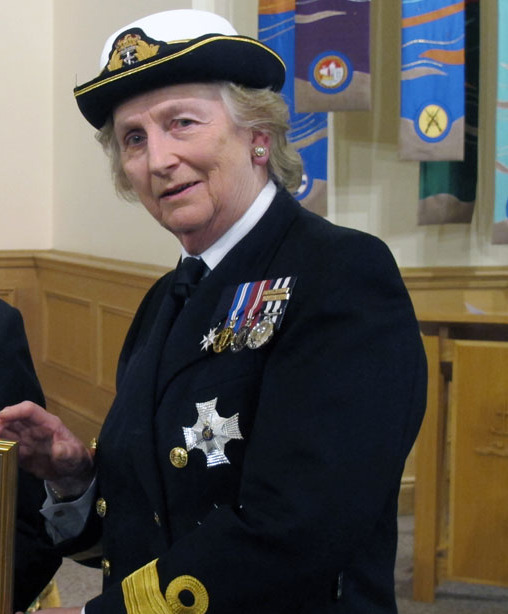
- Fagan in 2013

Lord Lieutenant of Hampshire
- In office 28 March 1994 – 11 September 2014
- Monarch: Elizabeth II
- Preceded by: James Walter Scott
- Succeeded by: Nigel Atkinson

Personal details
- Born: Florence Mary Vere-Laurie; 11 September 1939 (age 86) Nottinghamshire, England
- Spouse: Christopher Tarleton Feltrim Fagan (1960–present)
- Children: Christopher Hugh Tarleton Feltrim Fagan (died 1987); James Tarleton Feltrim Fagan
- Parents: George Haliburton Foster Peel Vere-Laurie; Caroline Judith Francklin
- Awards: Lady Companion of the Order of the Garter; Dame Commander of the Royal Victorian Order; Dame of the Order of St John; Service Medal of the Order of St John with two gold bars

Military service
- Branch/service: Royal Naval Reserve
- Rank: Honorary Rear Admiral

Lady Florence Mary Fagan (Note: After appointment as a Lady Companion of the Order of the Garter (LG), she became known as Lady Mary Fagan; she was formerly Dame Mary Fagan.) (born 11 September 1939) is a former Lord Lieutenant of Hampshire, who served from 1994 until her retirement on 11 September 2014.

== Early life and family ==
Fagan was born at Gonalston Hall, Nottinghamshire, England. Fagan's parents were Lt. Col. George Haliburton Foster Peel Vere-Laurie and Caroline Judith Francklin.

She was married on 21 October 1960 to Captain Christopher Tarleton Feltrim Fagan, son of Christopher Frederick Feltrim Fagan and Helen Maud Tarleton, with whom she has had two sons: Christopher Hugh Tarleton Feltrim Fagan (died in a motor car accident in 1987) and James Tarleton Feltrim Fagan.

== Charitable and public service ==
Lady Mary is chair of trustees of the Countess of Brecknock Hospice Trust. She is also a trustee of the Overlord Embroidery Trust, The Edwina Mountbatten and Leonora Children's Foundation, and Winchester Cathedral Trust.

She served as Chancellor of the University of Winchester from 2006 to 2014.

== Honours ==
In the 2009 Birthday Honours, she was appointed a Dame Commander of the Royal Victorian Order (DCVO), and thereby granted the title dame. She was appointed a Lady Companion of the Order of the Garter (LG) on 23 April 2018, and thereby granted the title lady. She is also a Dame of the Order of St John.

== Affiliations ==
- Honorary Rear Admiral in the Royal Naval Reserve
- Honorary Colonel, 457 Battery RA
- Chairman of the Advisory Committee for Magistrates
- 27 April 1998: Honorary Colonel, 78 (Fortress) Engineer Regiment (Volunteers)
- Honorary Colonel, Royal Electrical and Mechanical Engineers (Volunteers) 4th Division

== Arms ==
Coat of arms of Mary Fagan
Notes Fagan uses the same shield that her father, George Halliburton Vere-Laurie, used. Meanwhile, Fagan's supporters and badge were granted directly to her by the College of Arms. A wooden rendition of her badge has been carved to be placed above her Garter stall in St George's Chapel, in place of the usual wooden crest that appears above men's stalls. Crest None Motto Vero Nihil Verius (lit. Nothing truer than truth) Orders The Order of the Garter (Appointed 2018); The Royal Victorian Order (Appointed DCVO 2009) Banner The banner of the Lady Mary Fagan's arms used as lady of the Garter depicted at St George's Chapel. Badge On a chapeau Gules turned up and semy of mullets Argent a boar passant Symbolism The arms are her paternal arms: the first quarter is for Laurie (containing laurel branches as a pun on the name), while the second quarter is for Vere. Fagan's motto is also taken from the Vere family, with the Latin "Vero" being a play upon the name. An alternative translation of the motto could be Nothing truer than Vere. Similarly, the boar and chapeau badge is a variation of the crest of the Vere family. The boar supporters are coherent with the boar heraldry of the Veres but are also a reference to Fagan's former position as Lord Lieutenant of Hampshire: a white boar is a symbol of Hampshire. White boar supporters also appear in the coat of arms of the University of Winchester, of which she has been Chancellor. Her position at Winchester is further reflected in the castles – upon which the boars stand – which are taken from the arms of the City of Winchester.
