= House of de Vere =

English aristocratic family

de Vere family coat of arms with a mullet in the first quarter of the shield

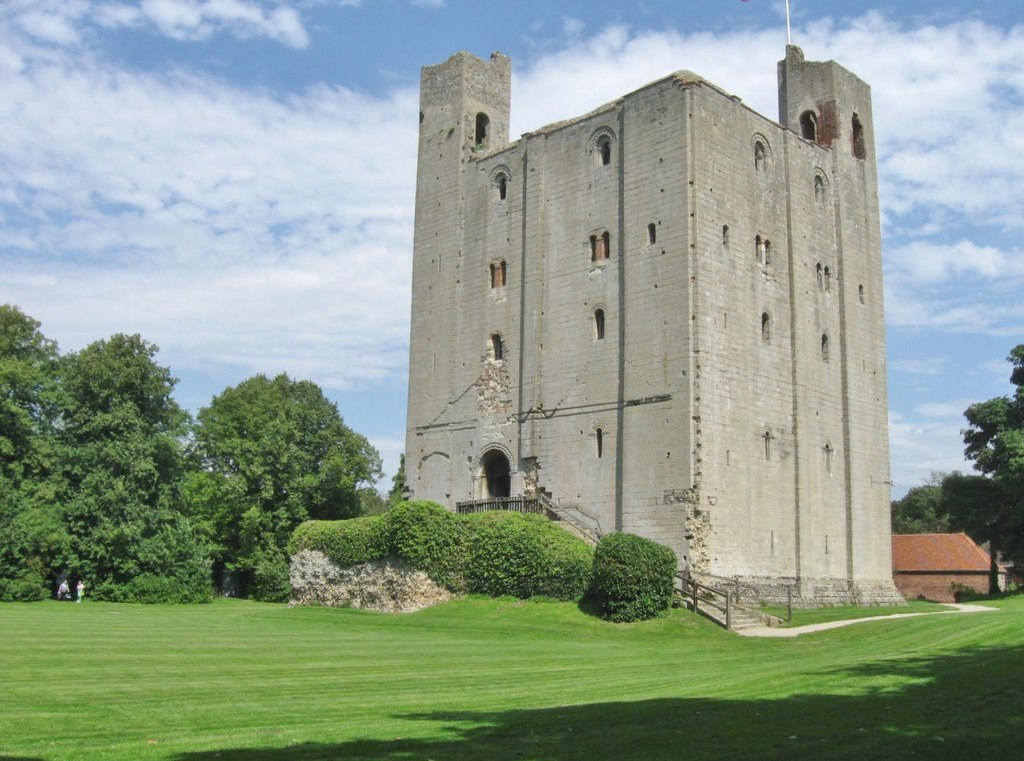
Hedingham Castle – the de Vere family seat. The Norman keep is all that remains of the castle in Essex where most of the land was concentrated.

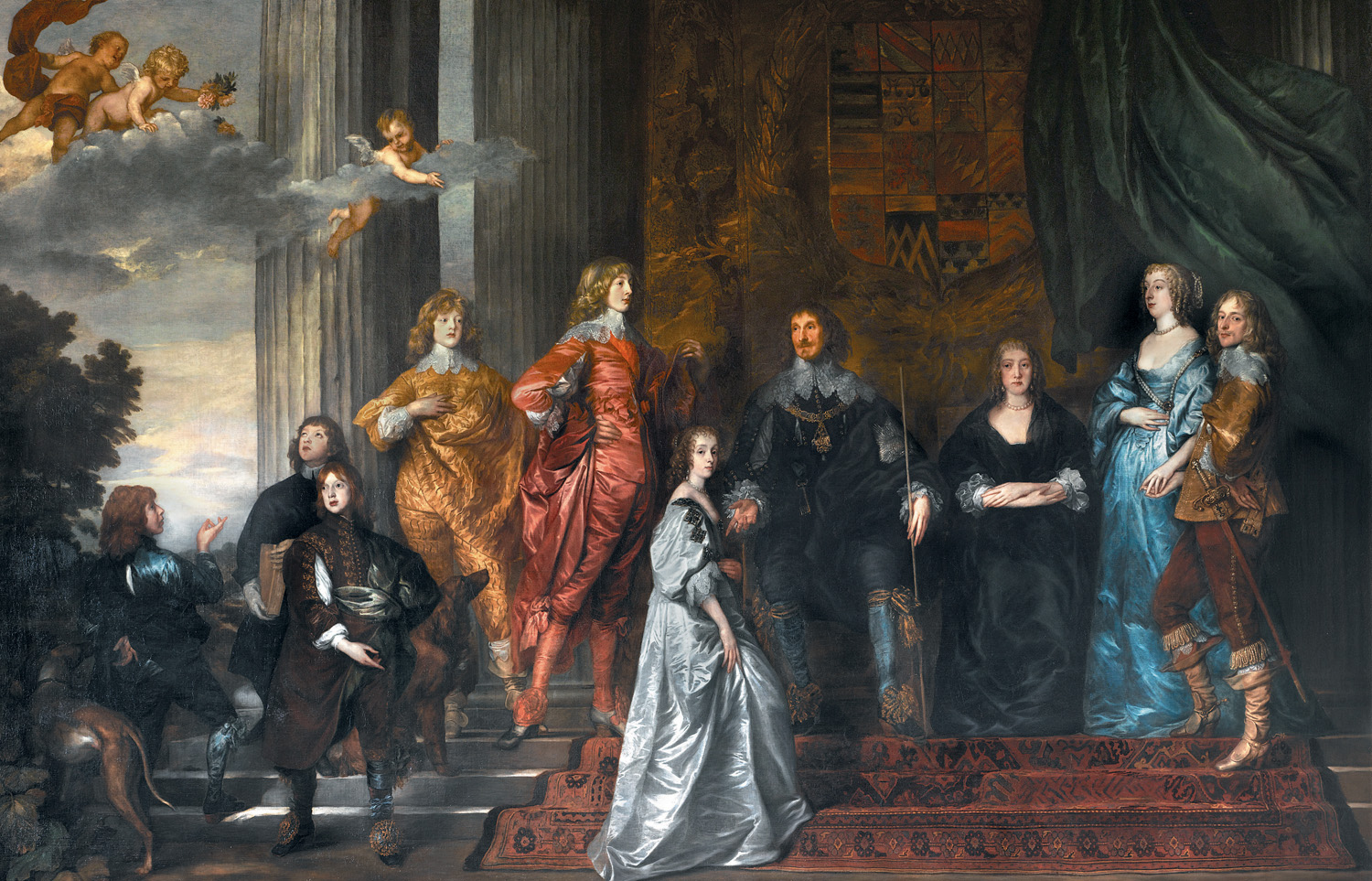
Susan de Vere, 4th Countess of Pembroke seated with her family, painted by Anthony van Dyck.

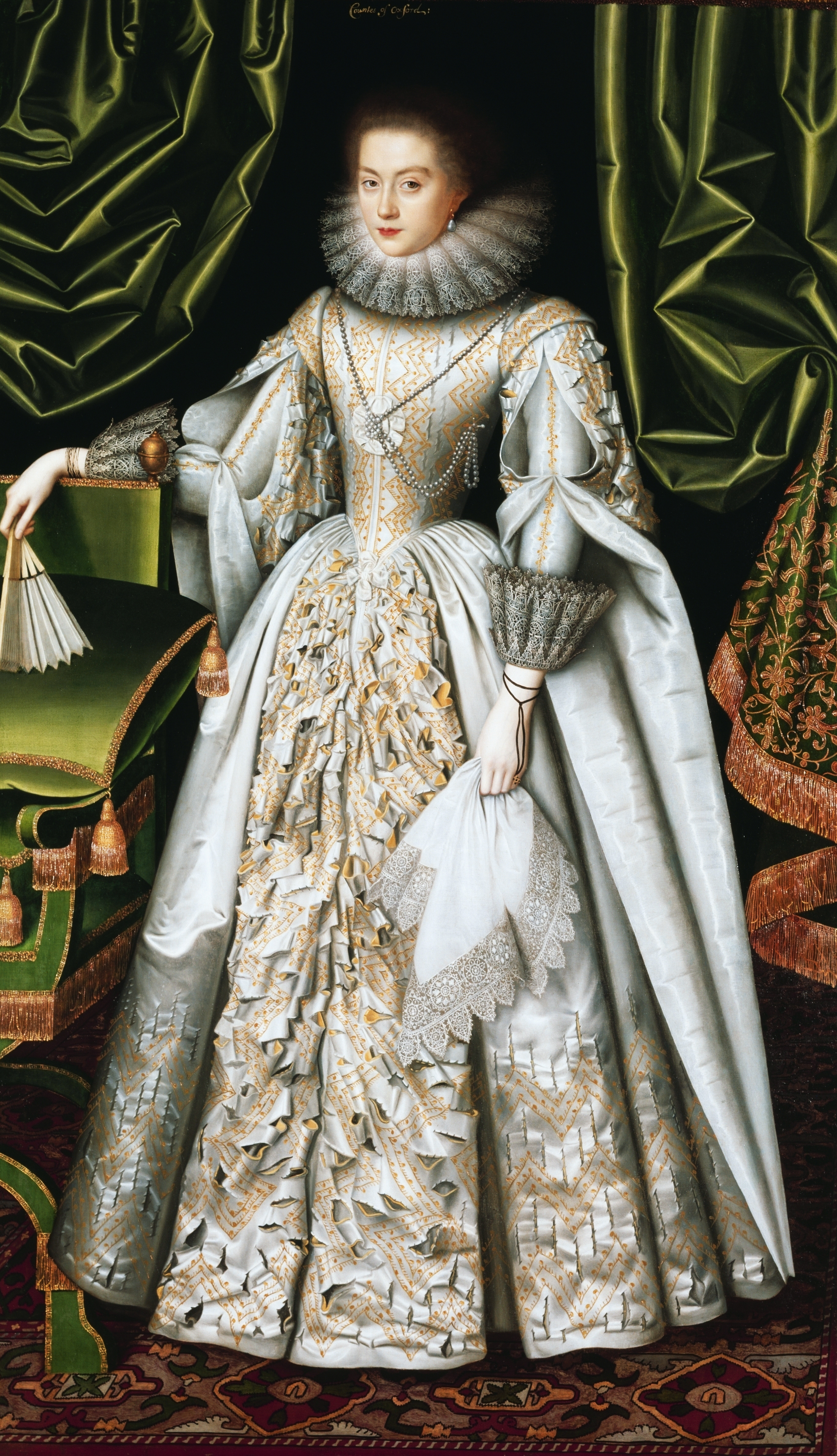
Diana Cecil, 18th Countess of Oxford, painted by William Larkin.

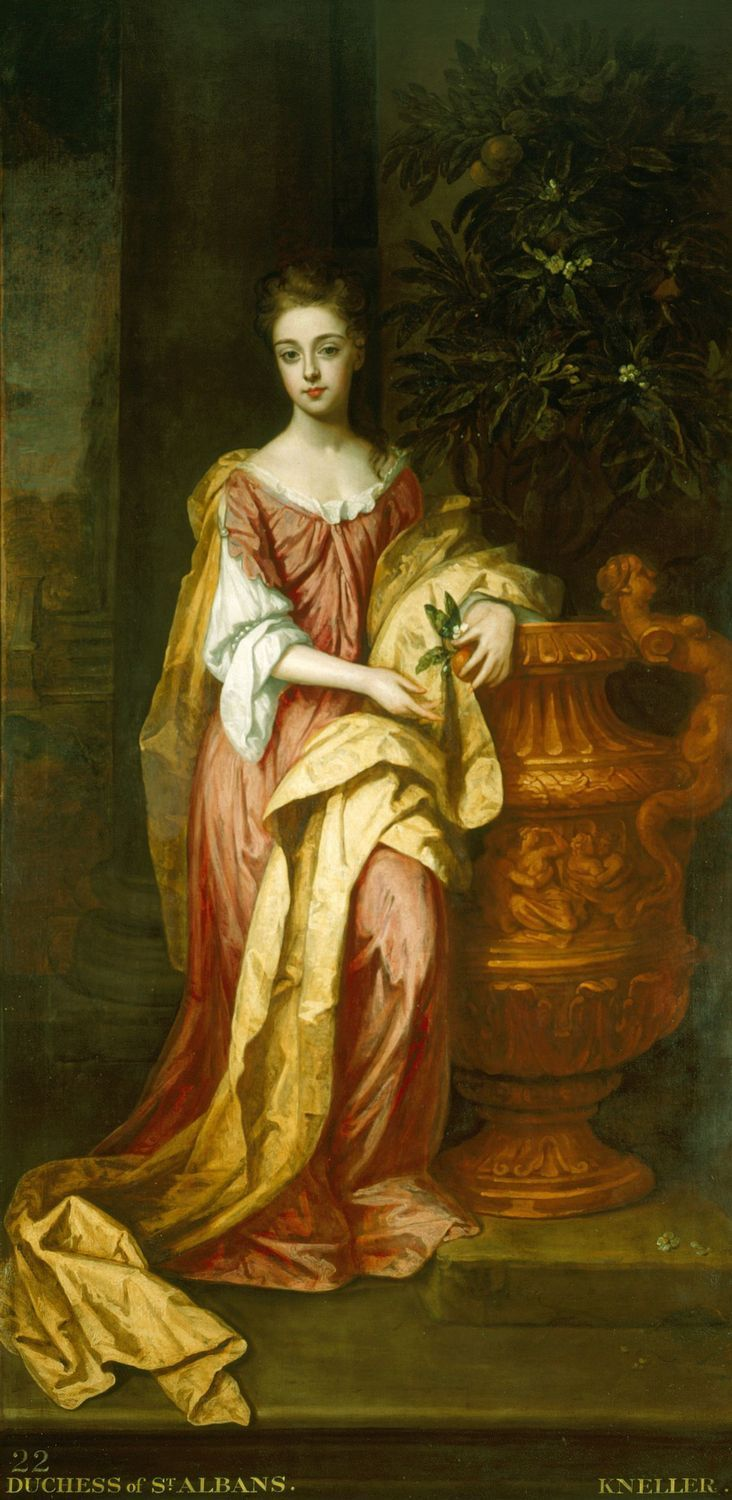
Diana de Vere, 1st Duchess of St Albans, her husband was the son of King Charles II of England, painted by Godfrey Kneller.

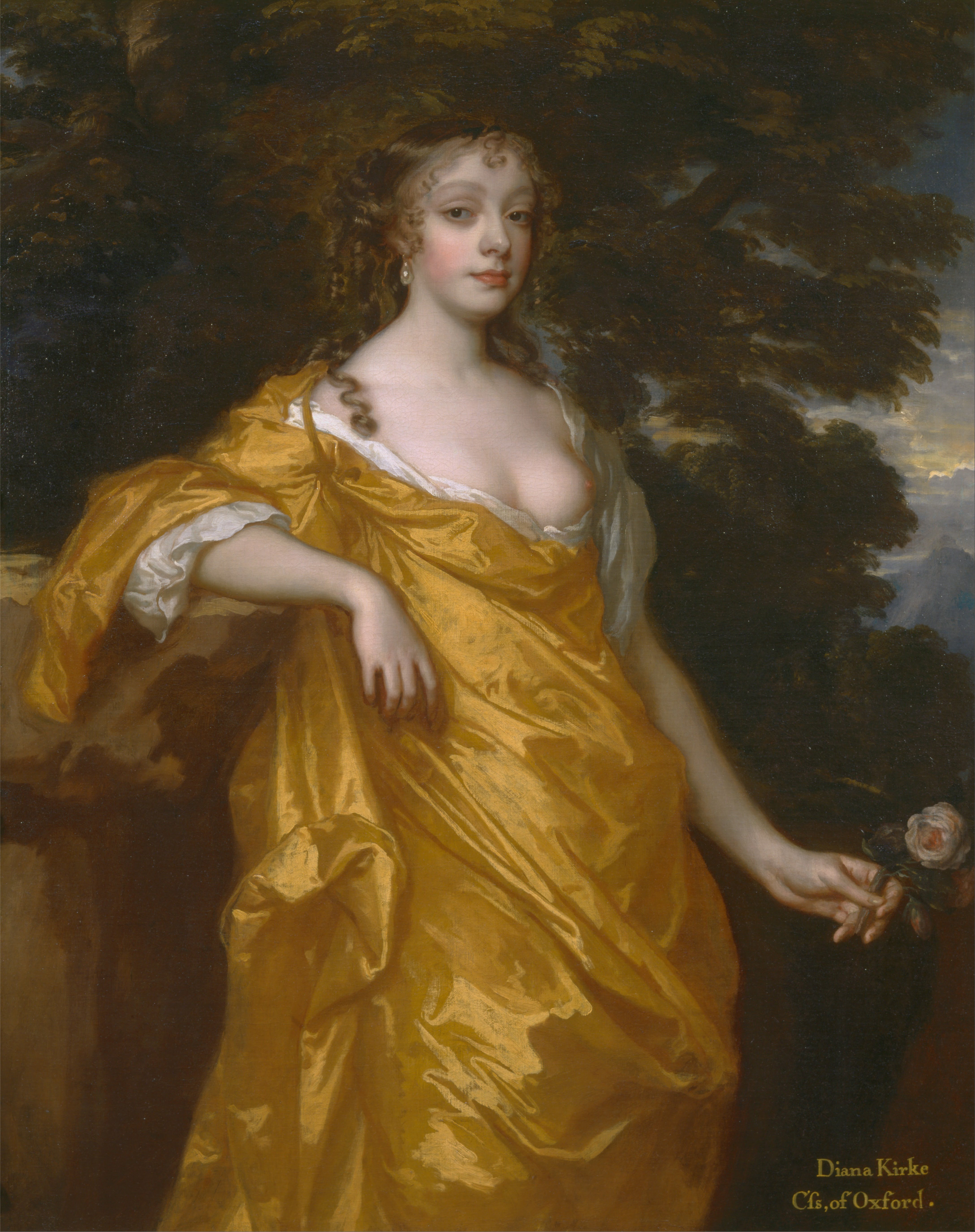
Diana Kirke de Vere, 20th Countess of Oxford, painted by Peter Lely.

The House of de Vere was an old and powerful English aristocratic family who derived their name from Ver (department Manche, canton Gavray), in Lower Normandy, France.

== History ==
The family's Norman founder in England, Aubrey (Albericus) de Vere, appears in Domesday Book (1086) as the holder of a large fief in Essex, Suffolk, Cambridgeshire, and Huntingdonshire. His son and heir Aubrey II became Lord Great Chamberlain of England, an hereditary office, in 1133. His grandson Aubrey III became Earl of Oxford in the reign of King Stephen, but while his earldom had been granted by the Empress Matilda and eventually recognised by Stephen, it was not until January 1156 that it was formally recognised by Henry II and he began to receive the third penny of justice (one-third of the revenue of the shire court) from Oxfordshire.

For many centuries the family was headed by the Earl of Oxford until the death of the 20th Earl in 1703.

When John de Vere, 16th Earl of Oxford died suddenly in 1562, the de Vere estates were encumbered with debts and the young heir entered into the feudal wardship system of the young Queen Elizabeth I, placed under "protection and authority" of the Court of Wards and Liveries and was sent to live in the household of her principal advisor, Sir William Cecil.

Among the offices the family held besides that of Lord Great Chamberlain was the forestership of Essex, and they founded the Essex religious houses of Colne Priory, Hatfield Broad Oak Priory, and Castle Hedingham Priory. Macaulay described the family as "the longest and most illustrious line of nobles that England has seen", and Tennyson's poem "Lady Clara Vere de Vere" made the name synonymous with ancient blood.

== Notable family members ==
- Aubrey de Vere I (died c. 1112), a tenant-in-chief in England of William the Conqueror
- Aubrey de Vere II (c. 1080–1141), Lord Great Chamberlain of England
- Aubrey de Vere III (c. 1115–1194), first Earl of Oxford
- Rohese de Vere, Countess of Essex (c. 1110–1169 or after), founder of Chicksands Priory, Bedfordshire
- William de Vere (1120–1198), Bishop of Hereford and author of a saint's life
- Guy of Valence (fl. 1230s), supposed by Robert Steele, probably mistakenly, to have been a de Vere
- Robert de Vere, Duke of Ireland (1362–1392), ninth Earl of Oxford and a favourite of King Richard II
- Bridget de Vere (1584–1630/31), Countess of Berkshire
- Diana Beauclerk, Duchess of St Albans (née Lady Diana de Vere, c. 1679–1742), courtier and Mistress of the Robes to Caroline, Princess of Wales
- Frances Howard, Countess of Surrey (née de Vere, c. 1517–1577)
- Susan de Vere, Countess of Montgomery (1587–1628/29)
- Francis Vere (1560–1609), an English soldier, famed for his military career in the Low Countries
- Horace Vere, 1st Baron Vere of Tilbury (1565–1635), a military leader during the Eighty Years' War and the Thirty Years' War
- Mary de Vere (died c. 1624), a noblewoman

Twenty males headed the family as Earl of Oxford from 1141 to 1703:

- Aubrey de Vere, 1st Earl of Oxford (c. 1115–1194)
- Aubrey de Vere, 2nd Earl of Oxford (c. 1164–1214)
- Robert de Vere, 3rd Earl of Oxford (c. 1173–1221), one of the 25 barons of Magna Carta
- Hugh de Vere, 4th Earl of Oxford (c. 1208–1263)
- Robert de Vere, 5th Earl of Oxford (1240–1296) (forfeit 1265, restored soon afterwards)
- Robert de Vere, 6th Earl of Oxford (1257–1331)
- John de Vere, 7th Earl of Oxford (1312–1360)
- Thomas de Vere, 8th Earl of Oxford (1337–1371)
- Robert de Vere, 9th Earl of Oxford (1362–1392) (forfeit 1388) first Marquess in England: Marquess of Dublin, later Duke of Ireland
- Aubrey de Vere, 10th Earl of Oxford (1340–1400) (restored 1393)
- Richard de Vere, 11th Earl of Oxford (1385–1417)
- John de Vere, 12th Earl of Oxford (1408–1462)
- John de Vere, 13th Earl of Oxford (1442–1513) (forfeit 1475, restored 1485) commander of the army of Henry Tudor at the Battle of Bosworth Field
- John de Vere, 14th Earl of Oxford (1499–1526)
- John de Vere, 15th Earl of Oxford (1482–1540), first protestant earl of Oxford, known as 'the good earl', patronised a company of players for which he commissioned John Bale to write
- John de Vere, 16th Earl of Oxford (1516–1562), retained a company of players, known as Oxford's Men from 1547 until his death
- Edward de Vere, 17th Earl of Oxford (1550–1604), patron of the arts, noted poet and playwright, one of Elizabeth’s great favourites. Oxfordians believe him to be the writer of at least some of the works attributed to William Shakespeare.
- Henry de Vere, 18th Earl of Oxford (1593–1625)
- Robert de Vere, 19th Earl of Oxford (1575–1632)
- Aubrey de Vere, 20th Earl of Oxford (1627–1703) (dormant 1703), died in 10 Downing Street with no sons and only one surviving daughter, Diana de Vere, who married the 1st Duke of St Albans.

== Genealogy ==
This summary genealogical tree shows how the house of de Vere is related:

de Vere family tree

Earl of Oxford, 1141
Aubrey de Vere d. 1194; 1st Earl of Oxford
Aubrey de Vere d. 1214; 2nd Earl of Oxford	Robert de Vere d. 1221; 3rd Earl of Oxford
Hugh de Vere d. 1263; 4th Earl of Oxford
Robert de Vere d. 1296; 5th Earl of Oxford
Robert de Vere; 1257–1331; 6th Earl of Oxford	Alfonso de Vere d. 1328
John de Vere; 1312–1360; 7th Earl of Oxford
Thomas de Vere d. 1371; 8th Earl of Oxford	Aubrey de Vere; 1338–1400; 10th Earl of Oxford
Marquess of Dublin, 1385; Duke of Ireland, 1386
Robert de Vere; 1362–1392; 9th Earl of Oxford	Richard de Vere; 1385–1417; 11th Earl of Oxford
Dukedom of Ireland and Marquessate of Dublin forfeit, 1388
John de Vere; 1408–1462; 12th Earl of Oxford	Robert de Vere
John de Vere; 1442–1513; 13th Earl of Oxford	George de Vere	John de Vere
John de Vere; 1499–1526; 14th Earl of Oxford	John de Vere d. 1540; 15th Earl of Oxford
John de Vere; 1516–1562; 16th Earl of Oxford	Aubrey de Vere (b. 1519)
Edward de Vere; 1550–1604; 17th Earl of Oxford	Hugh de Vere
Henry de Vere; 1593–1625; 18th Earl of Oxford	Robert de Vere; 1575–1632; 19th Earl of Oxford
Aubrey de Vere; 1627–1703; 20th Earl of Oxford

== Coats of arms ==
Arms of notable members of the de Vere family:

Arms of de Vere, Earls of Oxford

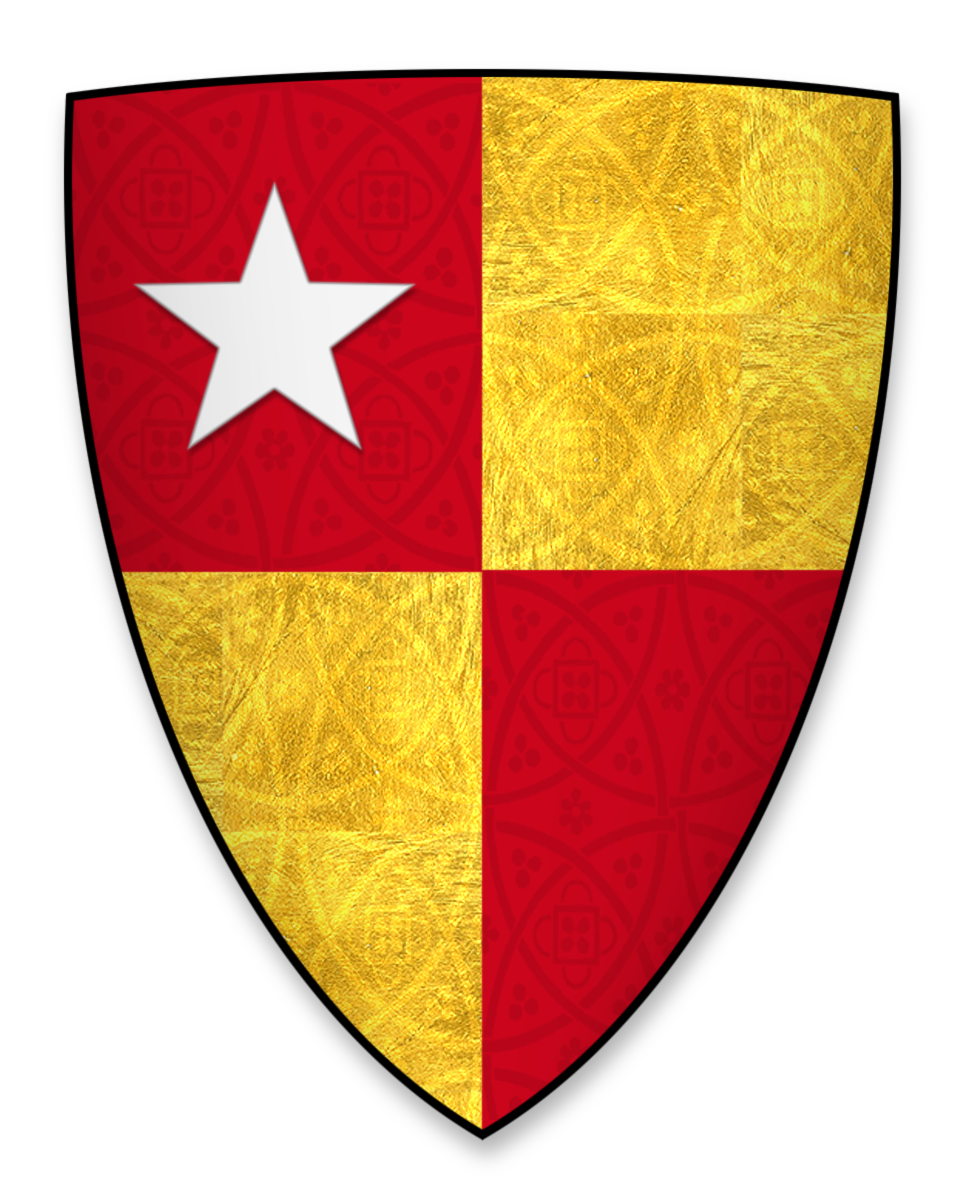
Arms de Vere, Earls of Oxford

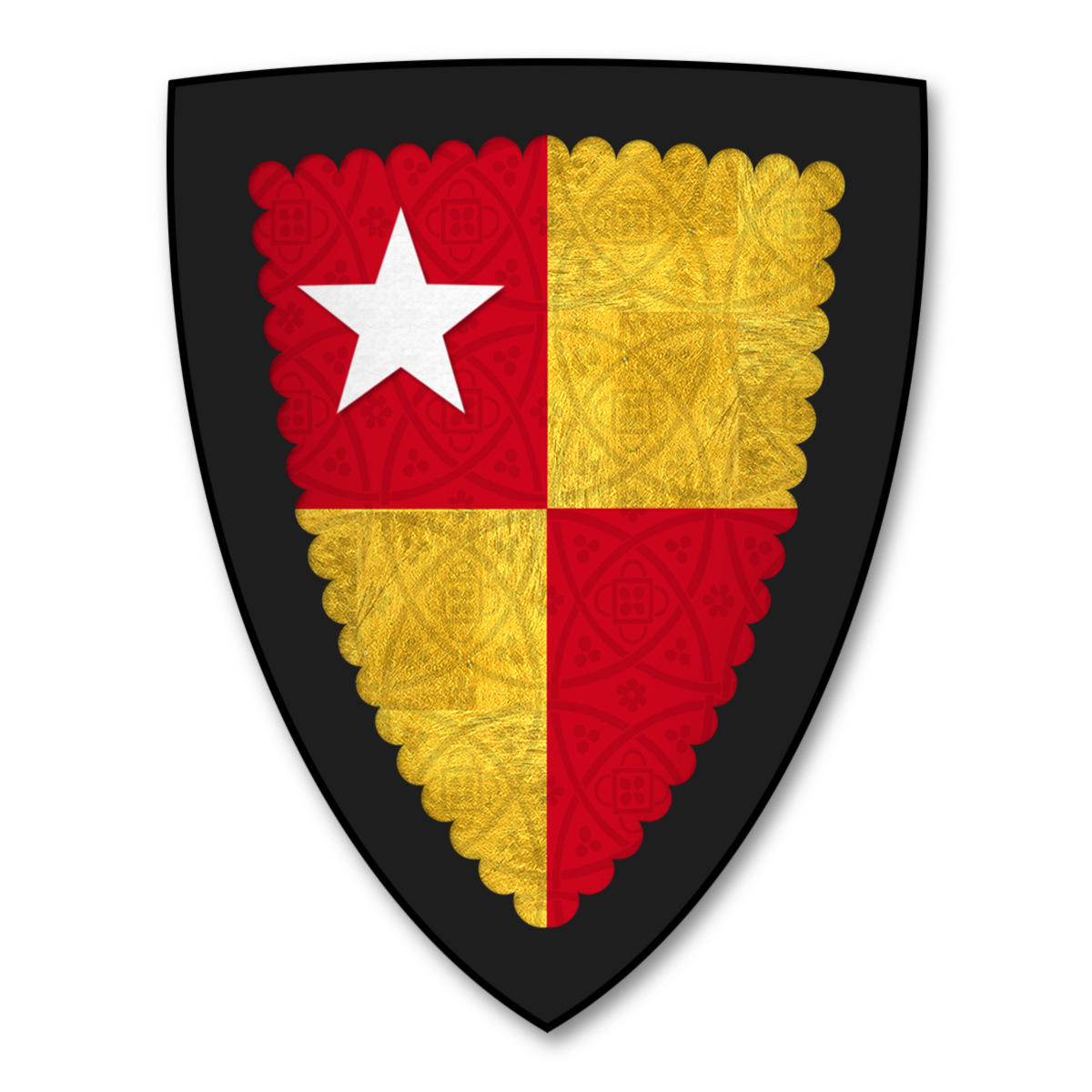
Arms of Hugh de Vere ("Huë de Ver")

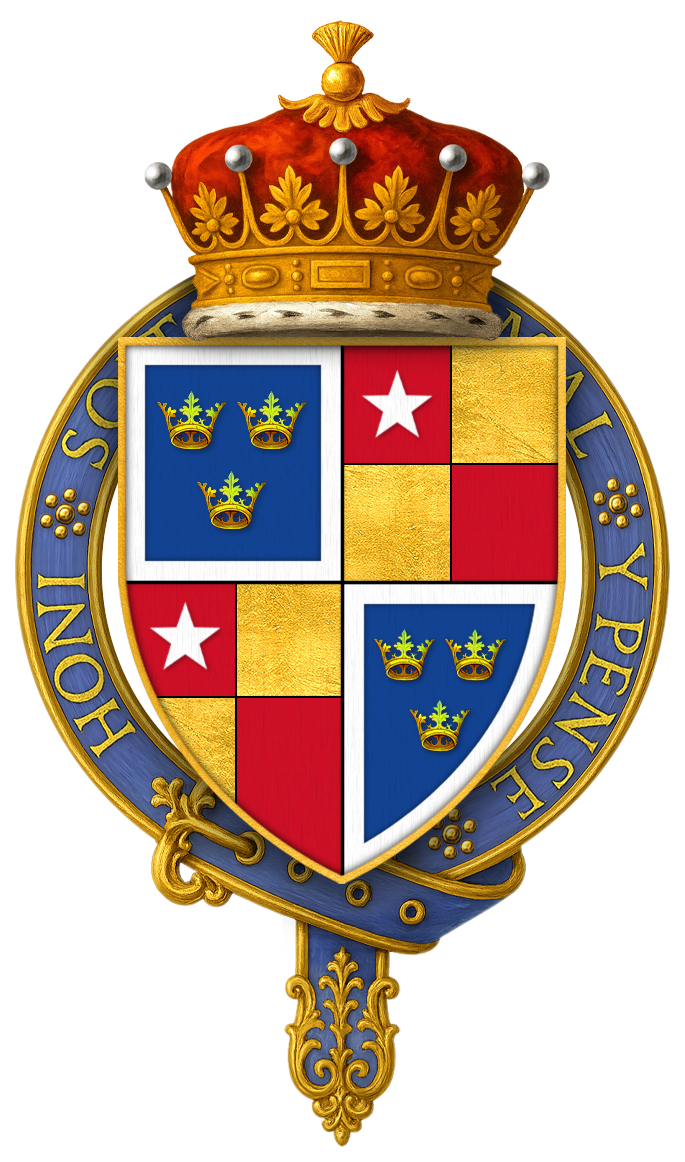
Coat of Arms of Sir Robert de Vere, 9th Earl of Oxford, 1st Duke of Ireland, KG

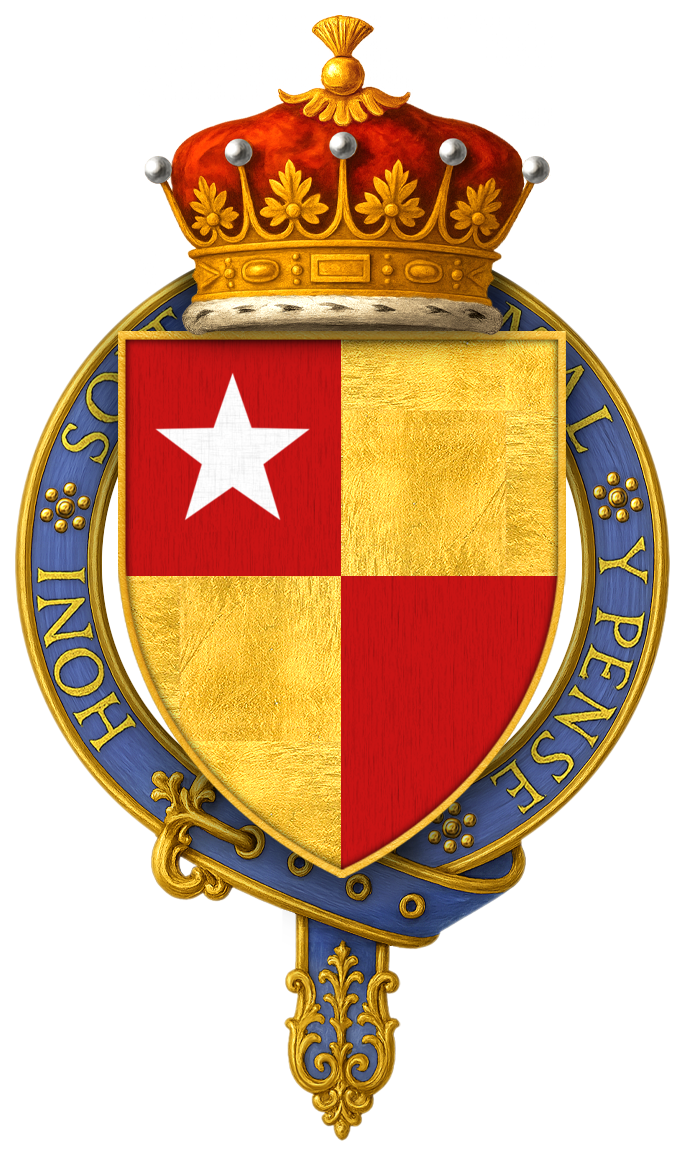
Coat of arms of Sir Richard de Vere, 11th Earl of Oxford, KG

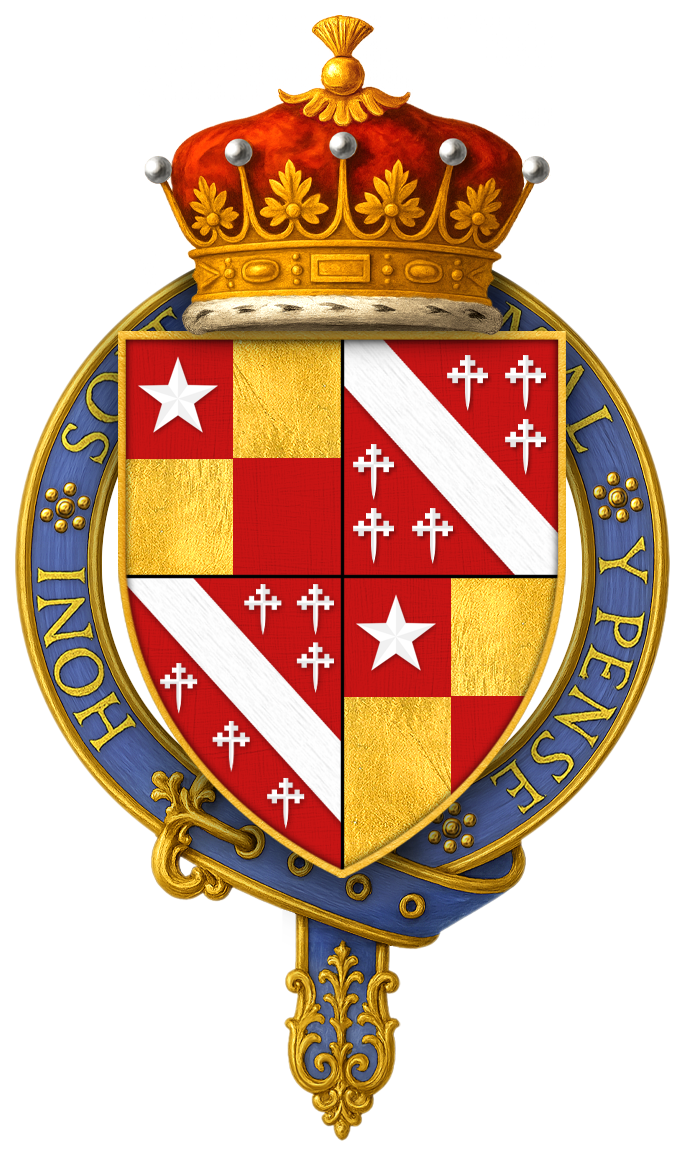
Coat of arms of Sir John de Vere, 13th Earl of Oxford

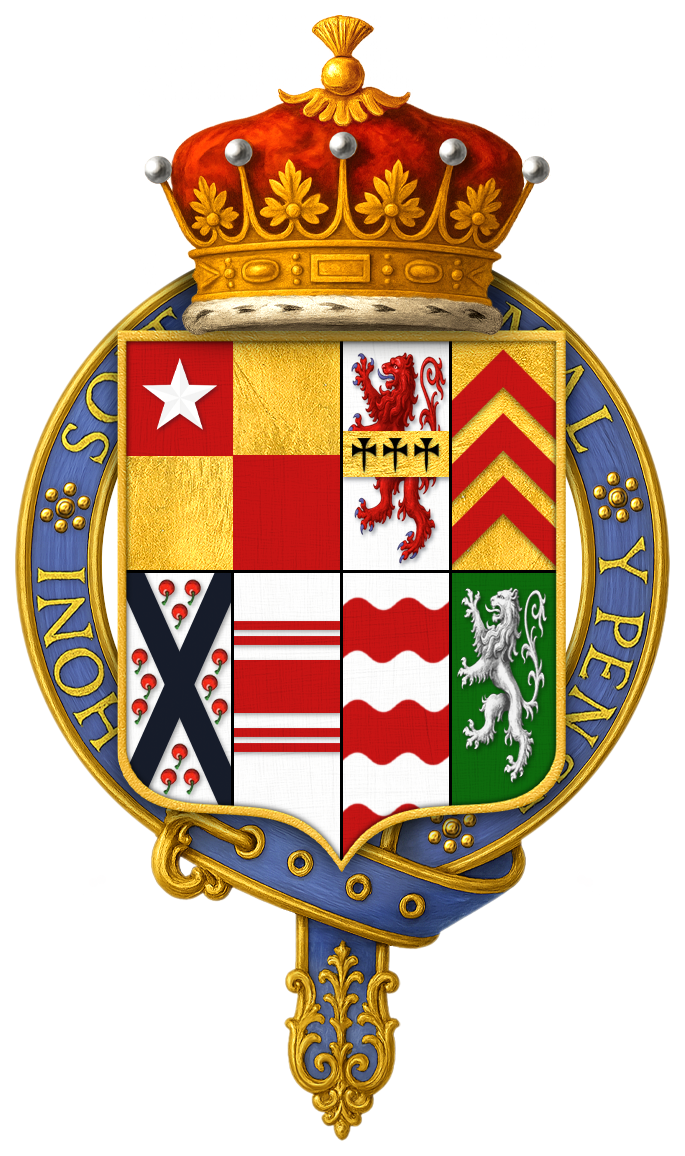
Arms of Sir John de Vere, 15th Earl of Oxford, KG

Arms of Beauclerk (Stuart), dukes of Saint-Albans, heirs to the de Vere lands

== Other properties associated with the De Vere family ==
- Bure/Bura, a town split between two counties: the smaller half is in Suffolk, on the north side of the River Stour, known as Bures St Mary − there are the remains of the tombs of the 5th, 8th and 11th earls. The other half is in Essex, known as Bures Hamlet.
- Hatfield Broad Oak Priory in Essex − there is the tomb of Robert de Vere, 3rd Earl of Oxford

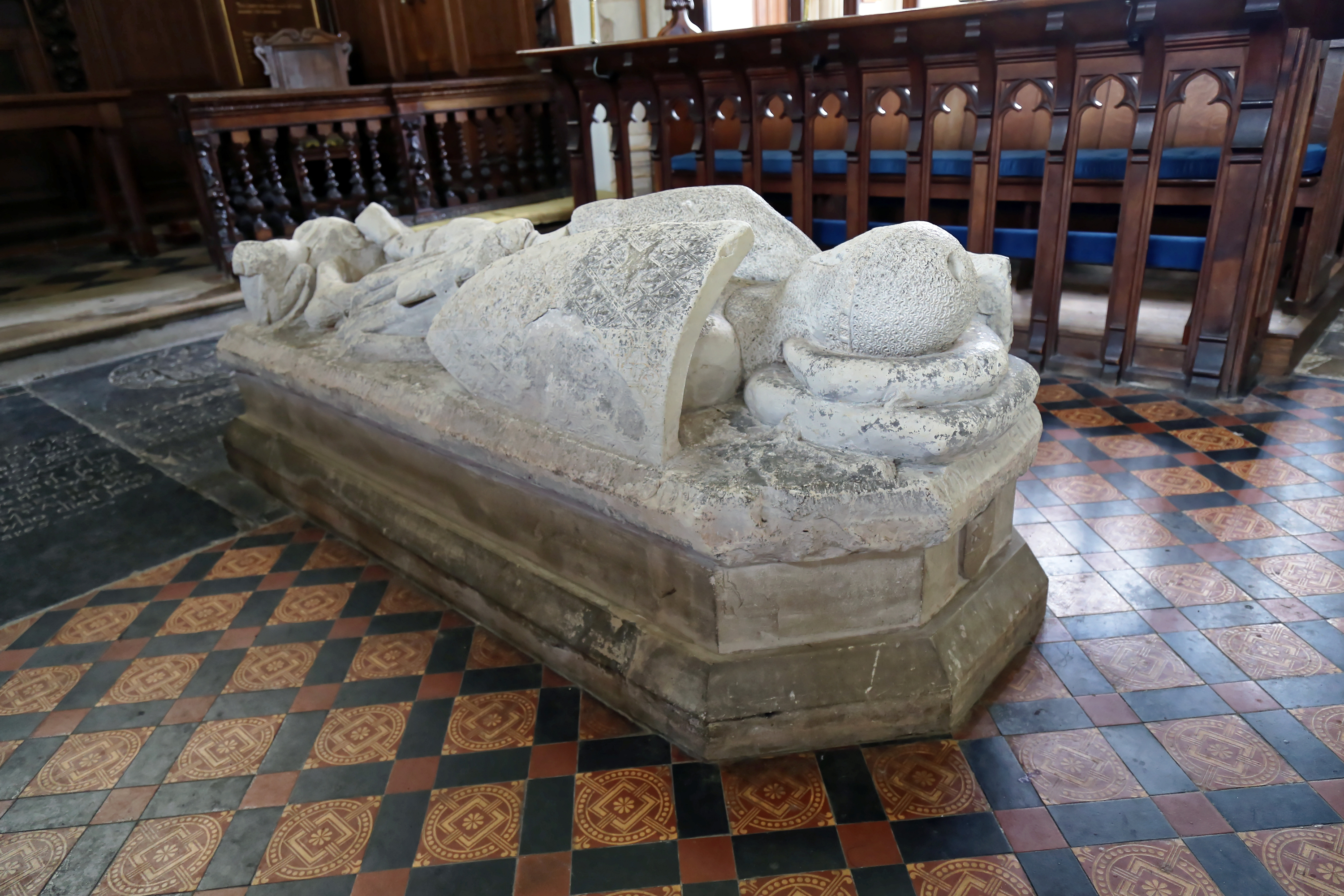
Robert de Vere, 3rd Earl of Oxford effigy, St Mary's Church, Hatfield Broad Oak

- de Vere House (known as the Harry Potter house) in Lavenham, Suffolk
- Montacute House in South Somerset − which houses most of the family portraits
- 10 Downing Street – built and once owned by the de Vere family

== See also ==
- De Vere (disambiguation), other people with the surname de Vere
- Vere (disambiguation), other people with the surname Vere
- De Vere Pedigree from the De Vere Society
