= De Vere =

De Vere is a surname and given name.

== Notable families ==
- House of de Vere, an English aristocratic family, including the Earls of Oxford
- De Vere baronets, a title in the Baronetage of Ireland

== People with the surname ==
Notable people with the surname include:

- Alison de Vere (1927–2001), British animator
- Aubrey De Vere (disambiguation), the name of several people
- Cecil Valentine De Vere (1845–1875), British chess player
- Clementine de Vere (1888–1973), British magician and illusionist
- Edward de Vere, 17th Earl of Oxford (1550–1604), Lord Great Chamberlain to Elizabeth, also believed by some to have penned Shakespeare's works
  - De Vere Society, a British group supporting the Oxfordian theory of Shakespeare authorship
- Harry De Vere (1870–1923), American silent film actor
- John de Vere (disambiguation), the name of several people
- Luke DeVere (born 1989), Australian footballer
- Mary de Vere (died c. 1624), English noblewoman
- Michael De Vere (born 1976), Australian rugby league footballer
- Pearl de Vere (c. 1862–1897), brothel owning madam of the American Old West
- Richard De Vere (1967–2014), British showman
- Robert de Vere (disambiguation), the name of several people
- Stephen de Vere (1812–1904), Irish Member of Parliament

== People with the given name ==
- De Vere Watson (1893–1982), American politician and lawyer

== Fictional characters ==
- Richard DeVere, in British sitcom To the Manor Born

== See also ==
- Vere (disambiguation)
- Chase de Vere, a finance company formerly owned by Bank of Ireland
- Horace de Vere Cole (1881–1936), prankster and eccentric
- Edward de Vere Hunt (1908—1941), British Army officer and Ireland rugby player
- Henry de Vere Stacpoole (1863–1951), Irish author
- "Lady Clara Vere de Vere", a poem by Alfred Tennyson
- Miss de Vère (English Jig), an 1896 French silent film
