= Aubrey De Vere =

Aubrey De Vere may refer to:

- Aubrey de Vere I (died c. 1112/13), tenant-in-chief in England of William the Conqueror in 1086
- Aubrey de Vere II (c. 1085–1141), master chamberlain of England
- Aubrey de Vere, 1st Earl of Oxford (c. 1115–1194)
- Aubrey de Vere, 2nd Earl of Oxford (c. 1163–1214)
- Aubrey de Vere, 10th Earl of Oxford (c. 1338–1400)
- Aubrey de Vere, 20th Earl of Oxford (1627–1703), Royalist during the English Civil War
- Sir Aubrey de Vere, 2nd Baronet (1788–1846), poet, of the De Vere baronets
- Aubrey Thomas de Vere (1814–1902), Irish poet, son of the preceding
