= Robert de Vere, 3rd Earl of Oxford =

Magna Carta Surety Baron

Robert de Vere
- 3rd Earl of Oxford
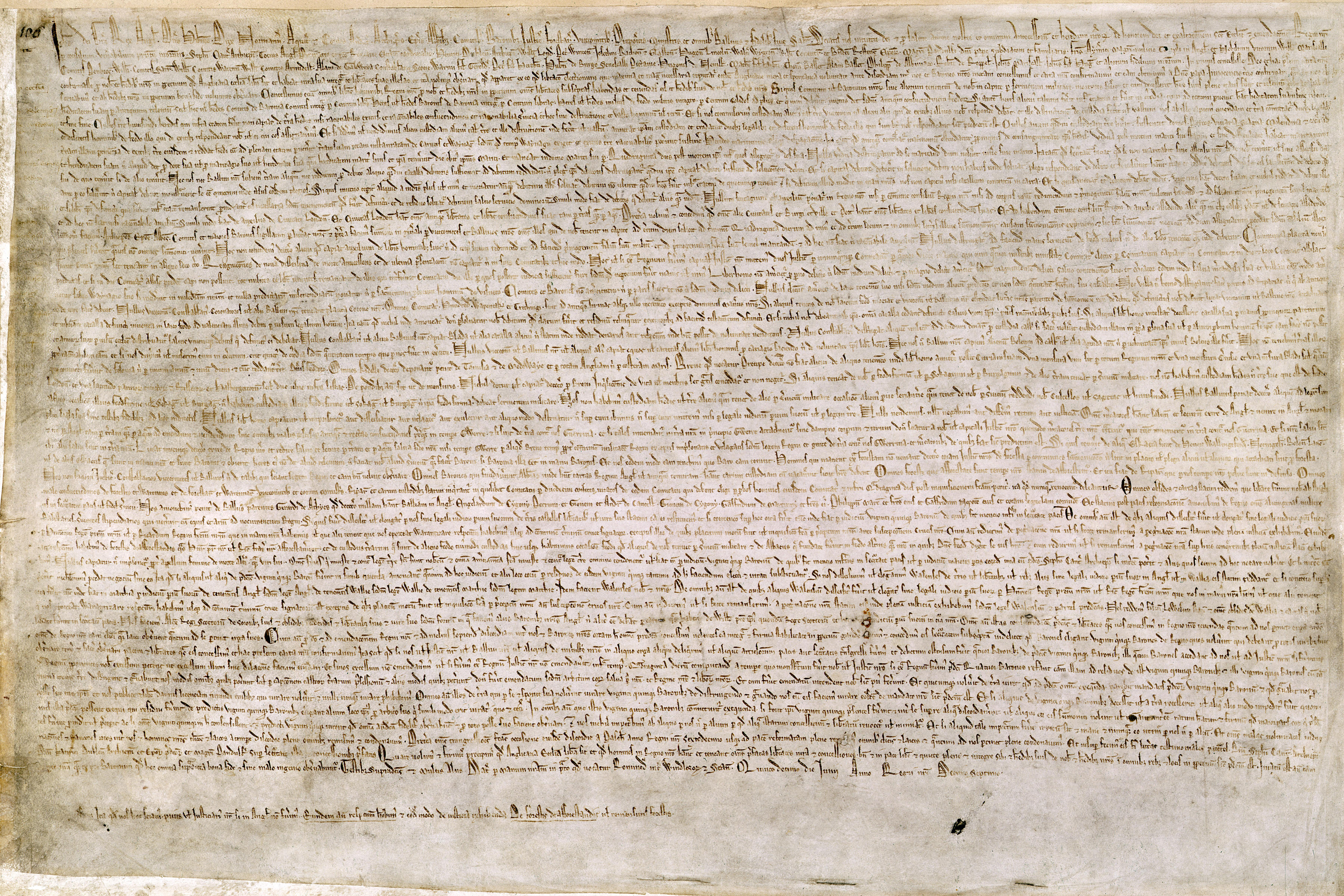
- One of only four surviving 1215 exemplifications of Magna Carta, property of the British Library
- Born: after 1164
- Died: before 25 October 1221; Hatfield Regis Priory
- Noble family: de Vere
- Spouse: Isabel de Bolebec
- Issue: Hugh de Vere, 4th Earl of Oxford; Eleanor de Vere
- Father: Aubrey de Vere, 1st Earl of Oxford
- Mother: Agnes of Essex

Robert de Vere (after c. 1165 – before 25 October 1221), hereditary Master Chamberlain of England, was the son of Aubrey de Vere, 1st Earl of Oxford, and Agnes of Essex. He succeeded his brother as the third Earl of Oxford, and was one of the twenty-five guarantors of Magna Carta.

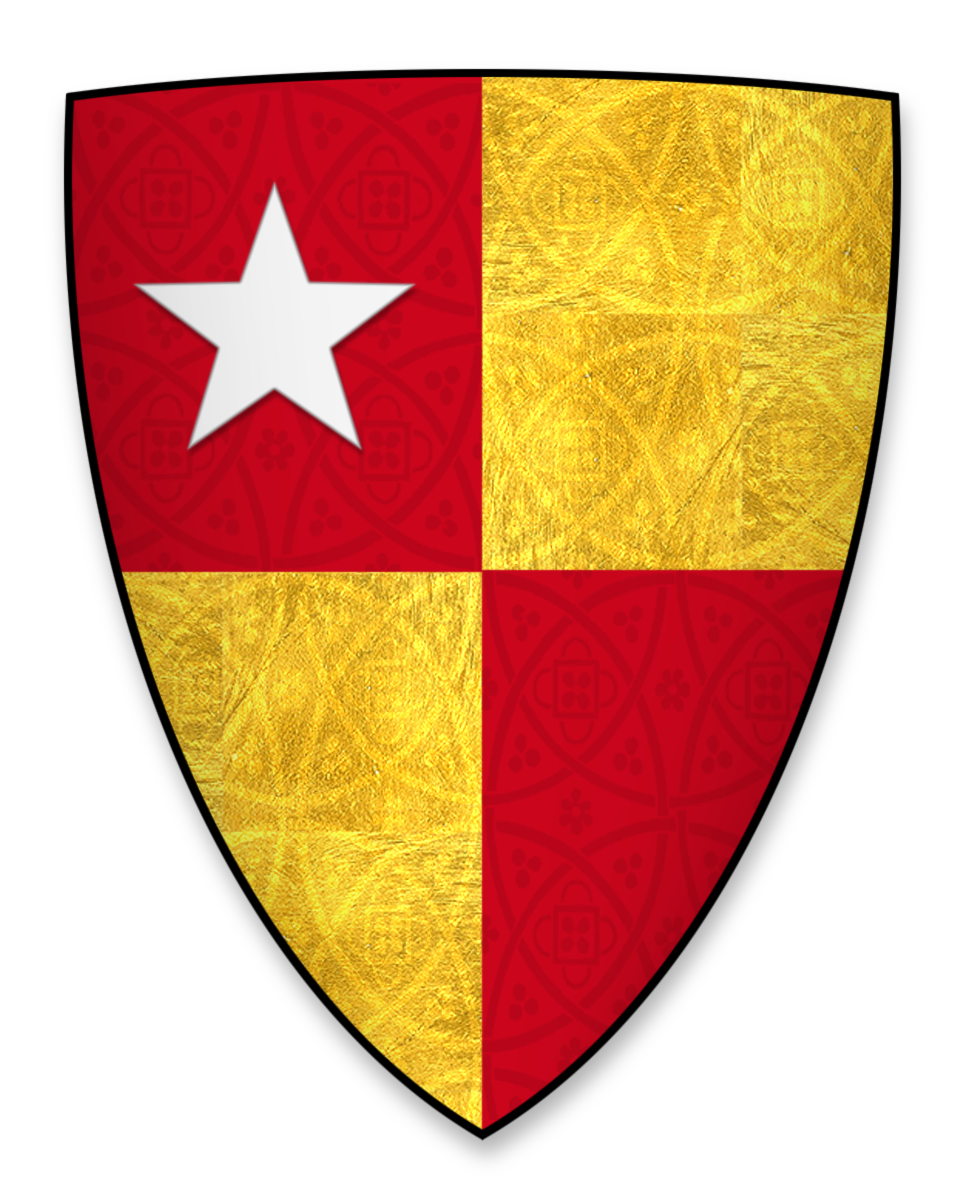
Arms of Robert de Vere

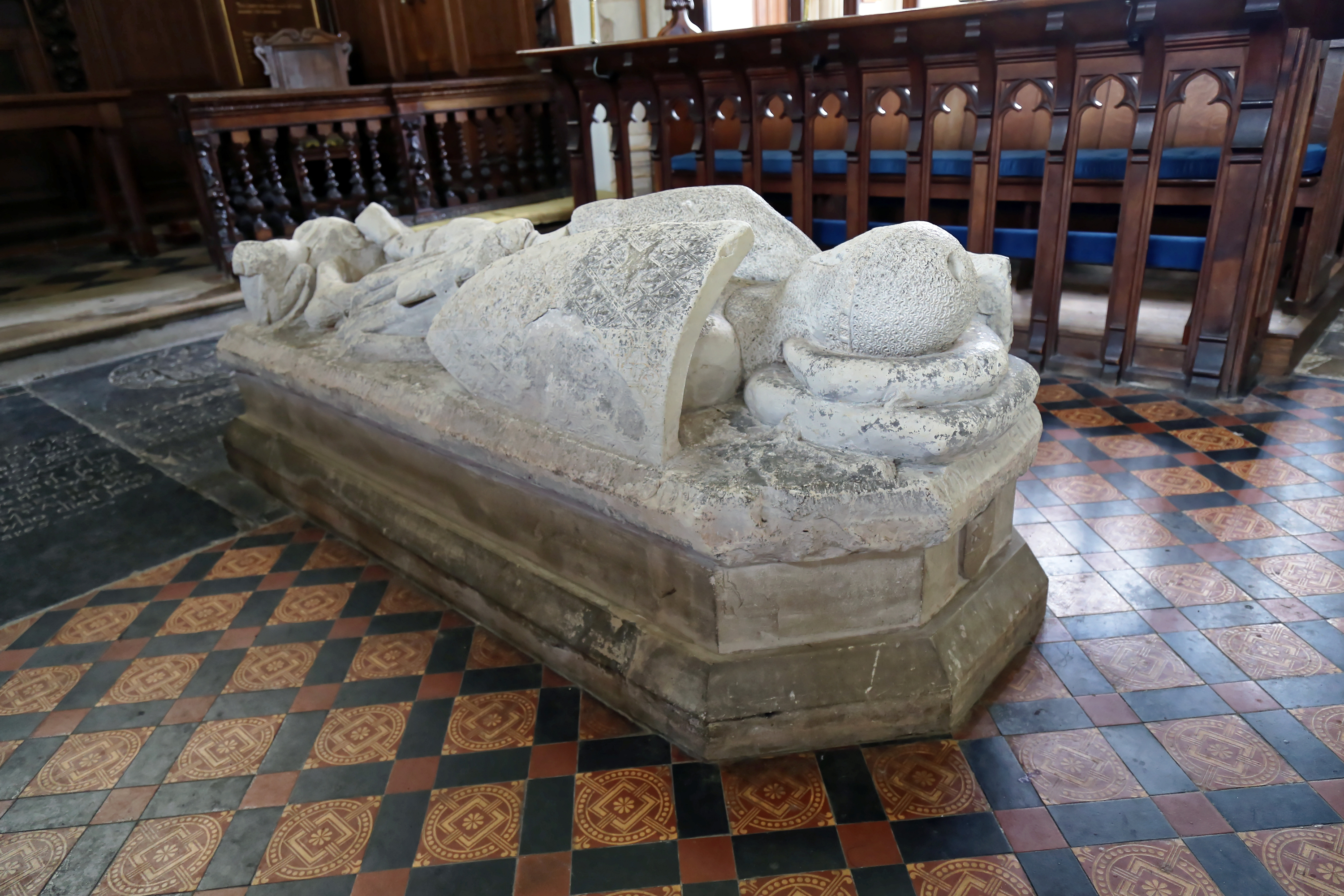
de Vere effigy, St Mary's Church, Hatfield Broad Oak

Robert de Vere was the second surviving son of Aubrey de Vere, 1st Earl of Oxford, and his third wife, Agnes of Essex. The date of his birth is not known, but he was likely born after 1164. Almost nothing is known of his life until 1207, when he married Isabel de Bolebec, the widow of Henry de Nonant (d. 1206) of Totnes, Devon.

In 1206–1207, Isabel and her sister Constance were co-heiresses of their niece, another Isabel de Bolebec, the countess of Oxford by her marriage to Robert's brother, Aubrey de Vere, 2nd Earl of Oxford. They divided the barony of Whitchurch.

The fact that aunt and niece had identical names, Isabel de Bolbec, and were successively countesses of Oxford and heiresses of Whitchurch has led to confusion between the two women.

When Robert's brother, Aubrey de Vere, 2nd Earl of Oxford, died in the latter half of 1214, Robert succeeded to his title and estates and the hereditary office of Master Chamberlain of England. The dower of Earl Aubrey's second wife, Alice (possibly his cousin, a daughter of Roger Bigod, 2nd Earl of Norfolk), had not been formalized. In 1215, Robert settled his sister-in-law's dower by lot, the earl drawing two knights' fees for every one drawn by Alice. This is the only known instance of dower being settled in this manner.

Robert joined the disaffected barons who met at Stamford and forced King John to issue Magna Carta at Runnymede on 15 June 1215. The earl was elected one of the barons who were to guarantee the King's adherence to its terms. Together with other Magna Carta barons, he was excommunicated as a rebel by Pope Innocent III on 16 December 1215, and joined them in offering the crown to Prince Louis of France.

Robert took up arms against King John, but pledged loyalty to him after the King had taken Castle Hedingham in March 1216. Later in the same year, however, he did homage to Prince Louis at Rochester. Louis entered London and was proclaimed King. On 14 June 1216, he captured Winchester and soon controlled over half of England.

In the midst of this crisis, King John died, prompting many of the barons to desert Louis in favour of John's nine-year-old son, Henry III. In 1217, Prince Louis retook Castle Hedingham and restored it to Robert, but despite this Robert transferred his allegiance to the new King in October 1217. Although he did homage to Henry, he was not fully restored in his offices and lands until February 1218.

Earl Robert served as a king's justice in 1220–1221, and died shortly before 25 October 1221.

He was buried at Hatfield Regis Priory, where either his son, Hugh de Vere, 4th Earl of Oxford, or his grandson, Robert de Vere, 5th Earl of Oxford had an effigy erected in which he is depicted in chain mail, cross-legged, pulling his sword from its scabbard and holding a shield displaying his de Vere arms.

== Issue ==
Robert de Vere and Isabel de Bolebec had a son, Hugh de Vere, 4th Earl of Oxford.

== Ancestry ==
Ancestors of Robert de Vere, 3rd Earl of Oxford

8. Aubrey de Vere
4. Aubrey de Vere
9. Beatrice
2. Aubrey de Vere, 1st Earl of Oxford
20. Richard FitzGilbert, Lord of Clare
10. Gilbert FitzRichard, Lord of Clare
21. Rohese Giffard
5. Adeliza de Clare
22. Hugues, Count of Clermont-en-Beauvaisis
11. Adeliza de Clermont-en-Beauvaisis
23. Marguerite de Montdidier-Roucy
1. Robert de Vere, 3rd Earl of Oxford
24. Swein FitzRobert
12. Robert FitzSwein
6. Henry of Essex
26. Roger Bigod
13. Gunnora Bigod
27. Adeliza de Tosny
3. Agnes of Essex
7. Alice de Montfort

== Footnotes ==
Peerage of England
Preceded by Aubrey de Vere IV	Earl of Oxford; 1214–1221	Succeeded by Hugh de Vere
