= Agnes of Essex =

Historical British nobility

Agnes of Essex, Countess of Oxford (1151– 1212 or later) was the daughter of a royal constable Henry of Essex and his first wife, Cecily. At the age of three she was betrothed to Geoffrey de Vere, brother of the first Earl of Oxford, and turned over to be raised by the Veres soon thereafter. She remained in the household of the earl of Oxford about three years, then moved to Geoffrey's care. In her eleventh year Agnes rejected the match with Geoffrey and by early 1163 was married to his eldest brother Aubrey de Vere III, 1st Earl of Oxford, as his third wife.

In spring 1163, Agnes's father Henry was accused of treason and fought (and lost, although he survived and retired to a monastery) a judicial duel. After her father's disgrace and the resulting forfeiture of his lands and offices, the earl of Oxford sought to have his marriage to Agnes annulled. On 9 May 1166, she appealed her case from the court of the bishop of London to the pope (the archbishop of Canterbury, Thomas Becket, being in exile at the time). While the case was pending in Rome, the earl reportedly kept Agnes confined in one of his three castles, for which the bishop of London Gilbert Foliot reprimanded Aubrey. Pope Alexander III ruled in her favor, thus establishing the canon law requirement of consent by females in betrothal and the sacrament of marriage.

The couple later jointly founded a Benedictine priory for nuns near their castle at Castle Hedingham, Essex around 1190. Countess Agnes long survived her husband and in 1198 paid the crown for the right to remain unmarried. She died sometime in or after 1212 and was buried in the Vere mausoleum at Colne Priory, Essex.

== Name Error ==
Many mistakenly have called Earl Aubrey's third wife Lucia, rather than Agnes. This mistake is based on a misreading of a single document associated with a religious house at Hedingham, Essex. A woman named Lucia was the first prioress at Castle Hedingham Priory. On her death in the early thirteenth century, an illustrated mortuary or 'bede' roll was carried to many religious houses requesting prayers for her soul. In the preface of that document Lucia is called the foundress of the priory. As the role of "founder" is generally ascribed to lay patrons and the countess presumably cooperated with her husband in the founding of the house, 18th-century scholars erroneously assumed that the prioress was Earl Aubrey's widow. Royal records disprove that assumption.

== Children ==
Agnes had four sons and a daughter, including two future earls of Oxford: Aubrey IV and Robert I. Her daughter Alice married 1) Ernulf de Kemesech, 2) John, Constable of Chester. Agnes's son Henry appears to have become chancellor of Hereford Cathedral under his uncle, Bishop William de Vere, and later a royal clerk under King John of England. Little is known of Ralph de Vere except that he may have been the second son (from the order in which he witnessed his father's charters) and died before 1214, when his younger brother Robert succeeded to the earldom on the death of Aubrey IV, 2nd earl.
