= Kirby Hall, Essex =

House in Castle Hedingham, Essex, England

Coordinates: 52°00′20″N 0°35′16″E

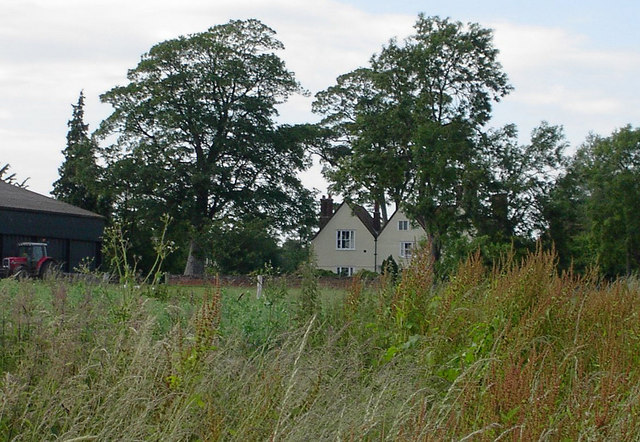
Kirby Hall

Kirby Hall is a house in Castle Hedingham, Braintree, Essex.

== History ==
It was originally the home of John de Vere (c. 1558–1624), eldest brother of Horace and Francis. They were members of a junior branch of the de Vere family and their first cousin was Edward de Vere, 17th Earl of Oxford, the owner of Hedingham Castle. In the 18th century it was the residence of Peter Muilman (1706-1790), a Dutch merchant, antiquary and father of the MP and antiquary Trench Chiswell. A view of the house features on a medal Muilman had struck to commemorate his fortieth wedding anniversary. It was Grade II listed on 7 August 1952 and is now a significant local farmhouse.
