= Countess of Oxford =

Countess of Oxford may refer to:

- Agnes of Essex, Countess of Oxford (c. 1151–1212)
- Isabel de Bolebec, Countess of Oxford (c. 1164–1245)
- Maud de Badlesmere, Countess of Oxford (1310–1366)
- Maud de Ufford, Countess of Oxford (1345/1346–1413)
- Philippa de Coucy, Countess of Oxford (1367–1411)
- Elizabeth Trussell, Countess of Oxford (1496–1527)
- Margery Golding (1526–1568)
- Anne Cecil, Countess of Oxford (1556–1588)
- Elizabeth Trentham, Countess of Oxford (d. 1612)
- Henrietta Harley, Countess of Oxford and Countess Mortimer (1694–1755)
- Jane Harley, Countess of Oxford and Countess Mortimer (1774–1824)
- Margot Asquith, Countess of Oxford and Asquith (1864–1945)
- Clare Asquith (b. 1951)

== See also ==
- Oxford (disambiguation)
- Earl of Oxford (Count of Oxford)
- County of Oxford
