= Isabel de Bolebec =

Countess Oxford; Major benefactor of Dominican Order

- Countess of Oxford
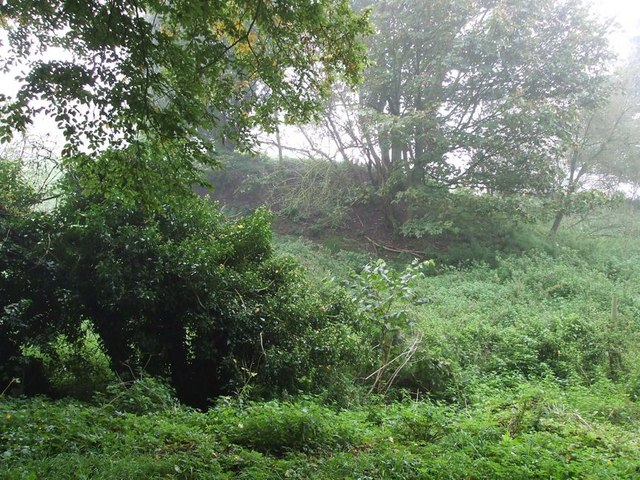
- Bolebec Castle mound, Whitchurch, Buckinghamshire
- Born: c. 1164
- Died: 2 February/3 February 1245; Black Friars church, Oxford, England
- Noble family: Bolebec
- Spouses: Henry de Nonant; Robert de Vere, 3rd Earl of Oxford
- Issue: Hugh de Vere, 4th Earl of Oxford
- Father: Hugh de Bolebec II
- Mother: Margaret de Montfichet

Isabel de Bolebec, Countess of Oxford (c. 1164 – 2 or 3 February 1245), was the eldest daughter and co-heiress of Hugh de Bolebec II, Lord of Whitchurch, Buckinghamshire, and his wife, Margaret de Montfichet. She married Robert de Vere, 3rd Earl of Oxford, and was a benefactress of the Order of Friars Preacher (Dominicans) in England.

Isabel de Bolebec was the daughter and co-heiress of Hugh de Bolebec II (died c. 1165), Lord of Whitchurch, Buckinghamshire, and his wife, Margaret de Montfichet. She had a brother, Walter, and a sister, Constance, the wife of Ellis de Beauchamp. In 1206–07 she and Constance were co-heirs to their niece, Isabel de Bolebec, daughter of their brother, Walter, and wife of Aubrey de Vere, 2nd Earl of Oxford.

Isabel's first husband was Henry de Nonant (Novaunt), Lord of Totnes, Devon, who died childless in 1206. The widowed Isabel petitioned the Crown in 1207 for the right to marry whom she wished. That same year she married Robert de Vere, a younger brother of the earl of Oxford, by whom she had a son, Hugh de Vere. In the autumn of 1214 Robert inherited the earldom at the death of his brother, Aubrey de Vere, 2nd Earl of Oxford, without legitimate offspring, and Isabel became Countess of Oxford. The new earl joined barons and kinsmen whose dissatisfaction with King John prompted their rebellion. On 15 June 1215 the King agreed to Magna Carta, and Oxford was one of twenty-five barons elected to guarantee its observance, and was thus among those excommunicated by Pope Innocent III when he released the King from its terms. In 1216 King John besieged and took the Oxford's seat, Castle Hedingham, in Essex. Oxford made peace with the regents of John's son, Henry III the next year, and later served as a royal judge. He died before 25 October 1221.

Isabel inherited the barony of Bolebec, and from her death in 1245 until 1703 the Earls of Oxford adopted the style of "Baron de Bolebec" in addition to their title of earl, and from 1462–1625 that of "Viscount Bolebec".

On the death of Earl Robert, the widowed Countess purchased the wardship of her minor son from the crown for the substantial sum of 6000 marks. In 1237, she and Hugh traveled together on a pilgrimage "beyond the seas". In 1224–25 Isabel sued Woburn Abbey for the manor of Mendham.

Isabel was a benefactress of the Order of Friars Preacher (Dominicans) in England, helping them to find quarters at Oxford, and contributing to the building of their oratory there about 1227. When the friars needed a larger priory, she and the Bishop of Carlisle bought land south of Oxford and contributed most of the funds and materials. She was buried in the new church in the friary there.
