= Colne Priory =

Priory in Earls Colne, Essex, UK

Coordinates: 51.9267°N 0.7100°E

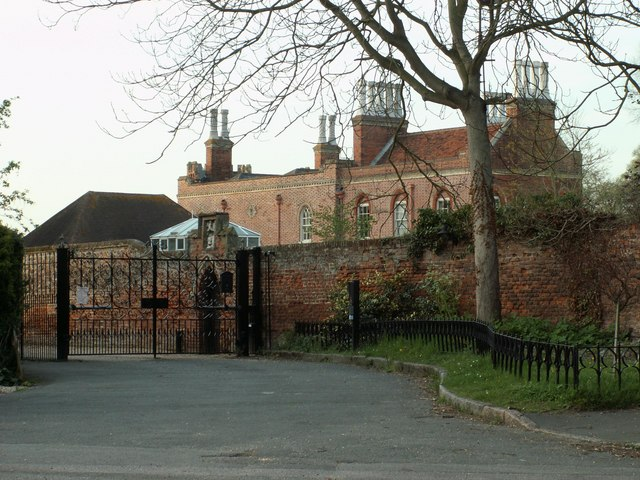
Colne Priory house; the boundary wall was built originally in 1426

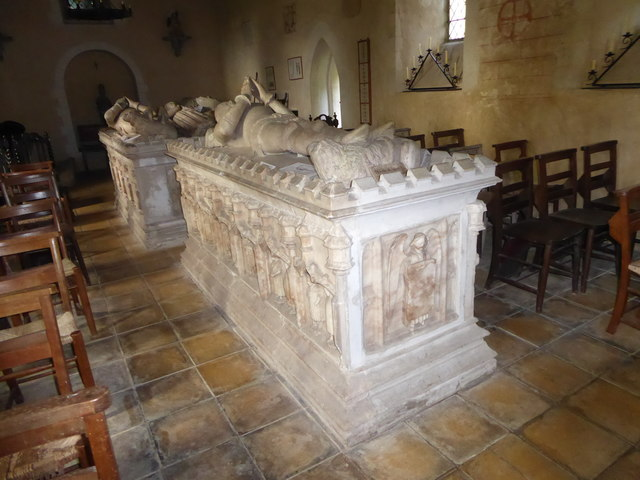
Tombs of two earls of Oxford, removed to St Stephen's Chapel, Bures, Suffolk

Colne Priory at Earls Colne, Essex was a Benedictine priory, initially a dependent cell of Abingdon Abbey, Berkshire (now in Oxfordshire). It was founded by Aubrey de Vere I and his wife Beatrice in or before 1111. One piece of research suggests that the original Abbot, Faritius, was appointed in 1101; he initially placed six monks at the site. Their eldest son Geoffrey had died at Abingdon about seven or eight years earlier and was buried there. On his deathbed, Geoffrey had bequeathed to Abingdon the church and lands at Kensington, Middlesex, and his parents and brothers had confirmed that grant, as had King Henry I.

Aubrey and Beatrice became very attached to Abingdon, but as they lived primarily in Essex (at Castle Hedingham), the aging couple found it difficult to journey there. They had built a manor house and subsequently founded Colne Priory, the only Benedictine cell of Abingdon, in order to have monks of that house close to them and as a family mausoleum. About 1112 Aubrey I retired to the priory, joined by his youngest son, William de Vere, both of whom died there shortly thereafter. The relations between Abingdon and its priory were occasionally discordant, and in the 13th century Colne Priory became an independent priory.

In the medieval era, the property was known as the Priory of St Mary the Virgin and St John the Evangelist (and also as the Priory of St Mary and St Andrew). Although specifics are few, there may have been an earlier minster on the site. During excavations between 1929 and 1934, a great deal of Roman debris was also identified.

The priory church is believed to have been "a magnificent building, twice the length of the parish church, with twin towers at the western end and a bell tower in the centre". For 14 generations, the church was the family mausoleum of the earls of Oxford and became full of their elaborate monuments. The Priory was the principal burial place of the earls of Oxford, with all but a few buried there to 1703.

An archaeology team provided these specifics about additions to the medieval church: It "was... adapted by the addition of two chapels on the northern side of the presbytery and a third chapel to the south... to house the remains of members of the De Vere family".

Based on the excavations that finished in 1934, an archaeologist produced a Priory ground plan (map) during the following year. A history published in 2001 provides this narrative:

The cloister lay south of the nave, with the chapter house and the dorter on its east side and the frater on the south; the infirmary block was presumably further east... At the Dissolution (fn. 7) the rooms included the hall, a parlour with a chamber over it, a chamber next to the court, the servants' chamber, the kitchen, and a pantry.

After the Dissolution of the Monasteries in the 16th century, the Crown granted the priory to John de Vere, 15th Earl of Oxford on 22 July 1536.

A manor house was later built; the Priory church was demolished at an unknown date, prior to 1760. The 2001 history provides these specifics: "the buildings were adapted as the manor house of Earls Colne and Colne Priory manors". In 1935, many of the surviving tombs at Colne, some with effigies, were removed to St Stephen's Chapel near Bures, Suffolk.

The house now on the site, also called Colne Priory, was built here circa 1825, after demolition of the manor circa 1820. It is not located exactly on the site of the original Priory. The current house incorporates sections of the Priory and of the post-Dissolution mansion. Some of the de Vere family remains are still buried under the lawns. Three tombs were discovered by archaeologists in 2011 or 2012; they are believed to be from "the early years of the Priory".

In March 2012 an episode of the Channel 4 archaeology programme Time Team was broadcast (Series 19, Episode 7, "The Only Earl is Essex"), which featured a three-day dig in the grounds of the priory.

== Burials ==
- Aubrey de Vere I and his wife Beatrice
- Aubrey de Vere II
- Aubrey de Vere, 1st Earl of Oxford
- Aubrey de Vere, 2nd Earl of Oxford
- Agnes of Essex, Countess of Oxford
- Hugh de Vere, 4th Earl of Oxford and his wife Hawise de Quincy (daughter of Saer de Quincy, 1st Earl of Winchester)
- Robert de Vere, 5th Earl of Oxford and his wife Alice de Sanford (daughter and heiress of Gilbert de Sanford)
- Robert de Vere, 6th Earl of Oxford
- John de Vere, 7th Earl of Oxford and his wife Maud de Badlesmere, Countess of Oxford
- Thomas de Vere, 8th Earl of Oxford
- Robert de Vere, Duke of Ireland
- Richard de Vere, 11th Earl of Oxford and his wife Alice Serjeaux
- John de Vere, 13th Earl of Oxford
- John de Vere, 14th Earl of Oxford

== Sources ==
- Cokayne, G.E. Monasticon Anglicanum. Vol. IV. pp. 95–99.
- Page, W.H.; Round, J. Horace, eds. (1907). "The Priory of Earl's Colne". A History of the County of Essex: Volume 2. Victoria County History. pp. 102–105.
