= Castle Camps =

Norman castle in Cambridgeshire, England

Coordinates: 52.056107°N 0.372603°E

Castle Camps was a Norman Castle located in what is now the civil parish of Castle Camps, Cambridgeshire.

== Owners ==
Castle Camps was originally a Saxon manor, belonging to Wulfwin, a Thane of King Edward the Confessor. After the Norman invasion, William the Conqueror gave the manor to Aubrey de Vere I, ancestor to the Earls of Oxford. The castle remained in the de Vere family until 1584, when it was sold by Edward de Vere, 17th Earl of Oxford, to Thomas Skinner (d.1596), Lord Mayor of London. On 2 August 1607, it was bought by Thomas Sutton, who endowed it to Charterhouse, who in turn sold all the estate except Castle Farm and Manor in 1919. Between 1941 and 1945, a large part of the land of became an airfield.

== History ==
In 1086, it was recorded in the Domesday Book as follows:

Castle Camps [Canpas]: Robert Gernon holds 2 hides in CAMPS, and Thurstan from him. Land for 6 ploughs. In lordship 2; 8 villagers with 8 smallholders have 4 ploughs. 6 slaves; meadow for 2 ploughs; woodland, 12 pigs. Value £4; when acquired 30s; before 1066 40s. Leofsi held this land under Earl Harold [former king], and could withdraw without his permission. In CAMPS Aubrey de Vere holds 2½ hides. Land for 11 ploughs. In lordship, 1 hide and 1 virgate; 4 ploughs there. 17 villagers with 4 smallholders have 7 ploughs. 6 slaves; meadow for 3 ploughs; woodland for 500 pigs; from village grazing 8s. Total value £15, when acquired £12; before 1066 as much. Wulfwin, King Edward's thane, held this manor. Norman holds ½ hide of this land from Aubrey. Land for 1 plough; it is there. The value is and always was 40s.

The Inquisitio Comitatus Cantabrigiensis, however, stated that there was land for 12 ploughs; 20 head of cattle, 134 sheep, 43 pigs, 50 goats, 2 horses; and that Norman holds ½ hide from Aubrey separate from the 2½ hides, making up part of a five-hide assessment.

Aubrey de Vere I may have fortified the manor house or ordered a Motte-and-bailey castle constructed, although the castle could date from the twelfth century. In the later twelfth century it would have been the largest fortress in the county of Cambridgeshire and was notable for its small bailey and the size of its motte, whose flat top covered just over an acre. There are records of work being carried out in the castle between 1265 and 1331, and it has been suggested that this could refer to the construction of the new bailey.

In the late 15th century, a four-storey brick tower was attached to the castle. The brick tower remained until 1779 when it was blown down by a high wind. The manor house was rebuilt in the 16th century, but fell down in 1738. Part of the back wall was then used in the construction of a smaller farmhouse, called Castle Farm. Most of this wall still stands. About this time a sketch was made of the Castle by S H Buck, dated 1731.

No warfare was recorded here; though justices of the peace were driven away by force of arms in 1526, during quarrels between a dowager countess and the new earl.

== Present ==
The only remains of the Norman Castle which still exist above ground is a piece of rubble in the yard to the south of the present farmhouse and Earthworks. It is a Scheduled Monument.

The highest point in the parish is at Wigmore Pond at 415' ASL.

== See also ==
- Castles in Great Britain and Ireland
- List of castles in England
- The Hundred Parishes
