= Aubrey de Vere II =

Son of Aubrey de Vere

- Born: c. 1085
- Died: May 1141; London, England
- Title: Sheriff of London
- Spouse: Adeliza
- Children: 9, including Aubrey, Rohese and Wiliam
- Father: Aubrey de Vere

Aubrey de Vere (c. 1085 – May 1141) – also known as "Alberic[us] de Ver" and "Albericus regis camerarius" (the king's chamberlain) – was Lord Great Chamberlain and Sheriff of London. He was second of the surname de Vere in England after the Norman Conquest, being the eldest surviving son of Aubrey de Vere and his wife Beatrice.

Aubrey served as one of the king's chamberlains and as a justiciar under kings Henry I and Stephen. Henry I also appointed him as sheriff of London and Essex and co-sheriff with Richard Basset of eleven counties. In 1130, he owed the king for various offenses, including the escape of prisoners under his custody, 550 pounds and four palfreys. This implies he would have been in charge of prisoners on a regular basis. In June 1133, the king awarded the office of Lord Great Chamberlain to Aubrey and his heirs. A frequent witness of royal charters for Henry I and Stephen, he appears to have accompanied Henry to Normandy only once. The chronicler William of Malmesbury reports that in 1139, Aubrey was King Stephen's spokesman to the church council at Winchester, when the king had been summoned to answer for the seizure of castles held by Roger, Bishop of Salisbury and his nephews, the bishops of Ely and Lincoln. In May 1141, during the English civil war, Aubrey was killed by a London mob and was buried in the family mausoleum at Colne Priory, Essex.

In addition to his patronage of Colne Priory, Aubrey either founded or financially supported a cell of the Benedictine abbey St. Melanie in Rennes, Brittany, at Hatfield Broadoak or Hatfield Regis, Essex. The stone tower at Hedingham, in Essex, was most likely begun by Aubrey and completed by his son and heir, another Aubrey de Vere, who was later created Earl of Oxford; his descendants held that title and the office that in later centuries was known as Lord Great Chamberlain until the extinction of the Vere male line in 1703.

== Marriage and Children ==
Aubrey's wife Adeliza, daughter of Gilbert Fitz Richard of Clare, survived her husband for twenty-two years. For most of that time she was a corrodian at St. Osyth's Priory.

Their known children are:

- a daughter (name unknown) who married Roger de Ramis.
- Alice "of Essex" (married 1. Henry of Essex, 2. Roger fitz Richard)
- Aubrey de Vere, 1st Earl of Oxford (married 1. Beatrice, countess of Guisnes, 2. Eufemia, 3. Agnes of Essex)
- Geoffrey (married 1. widow of Warin fitz Gerold, 2. Isabel de Say)
- Gilbert, prior of the Knights Hospitaller in England (1195–1197)
- Juliana Countess of Norfolk (married 1. Hugh Bigod, 1st Earl of Norfolk, 2. Walkelin Maminot)
- Robert (married 1. Matilda de Furnell, 2. Margaret daughter of Baldwin Wake)
- Rohese de Vere, Countess of Essex (married 1. Geoffrey de Mandeville, 1st Earl of Essex, 2. Payn de Beauchamp)
- William de Vere, Bishop of Hereford (1186–1198)

| Preceded by Robert Malet | Lord Great Chamberlain; 1133–1141 | Succeeded by Aubrey de Vere, 1st Earl of Oxford |
