= Castle Hedingham Pottery =

Art pottery studio in England

Example of Castle Hedingham Ware

Castle Hedingham Pottery was an art pottery studio run by Edward Bingham at Castle Hedingham in Essex, England.

== History ==
Bingham produced his Castle Hedingham Ware from about 1864 until 1901. It was made in a style reminiscent of medieval and Tudor wares. Bingham produced some large items, with 'Essex' jugs up to three feet high being typical. .

Edward Bingham (1829–1914) was the son of a Lambeth potter who had set up in Gestingthorpe, Essex making mostly functional ware. The family moved to Castle Hedingham in 1837. Bingham assisted his father in his business, while experimenting with more artistic wares. He received commissions from some influential people, including Sir A.W. Franks, but the initiative was not commercially successful, and in 1859 he opened a school. After five or six years he returned to potting full-time, and by 1864 had five or six boys as assistants. In 1894, he showed his work at the Art and Industries Exhibition at the Albert Hall.

Bingham passed the business on to his son in 1899. It was sold two years later to Hexter, Humpherson & Co., of Newton Abbot, and operated under the name of the " Essex Art Pottery" until its closure in 1905. Bingham continued to make pots there for a while, and then in a temporary workshop for a few months, before joining the rest of his family in the United States in 1906.

== Products ==
The pottery is somewhat similar to Elton Ware pottery made by Sir Edmund Elton of Clevedon Court in Somerset at about the same time. However, Elton was more adventurous with his materials and experimented with slip as well as specialist glazes including a striking development of the crackle glaze. Castle Hedingham pottery was less refined in its finish.
