= Aubrey de Vere, 2nd Earl of Oxford =

Chamberlain of England (1163–1214)

Aubrey de Vere IV
- 2nd Earl of Oxford
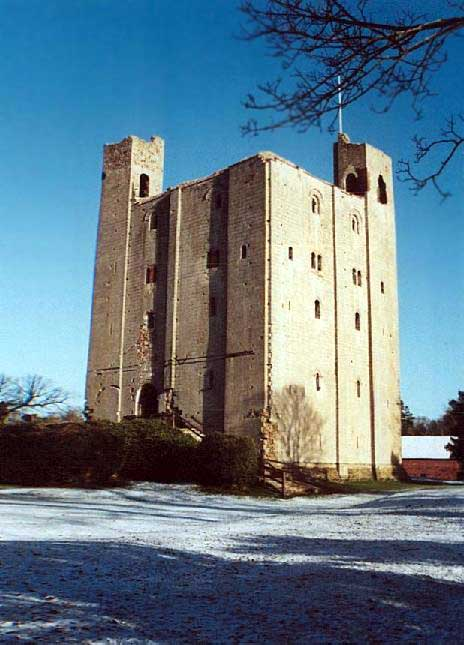
- Hedingham Castle, Essex, seat of the Earls of Oxford
- Born: c. 1163
- Died: 1214 burial in Colne Priory
- Noble family: de Vere
- Spouses: Isabel de Bolebec; Alice
- Issue: Roger de Vere (illegitimate)
- Father: Aubrey de Vere, 1st Earl of Oxford
- Mother: Agnes of Essex

Aubrey de Vere, 2nd Earl of Oxford (c. 1163 – 1214), hereditary Master Chamberlain of England, served in military campaigns under King Richard and King John. He was succeeded in the earldom by his brother, Robert de Vere, 3rd Earl of Oxford.

Aubrey, the eldest son and heir of Aubrey de Vere, 1st Earl of Oxford, by his third wife, Agnes of Essex, the daughter of Henry of Essex, lord of Rayleigh, was born in 1163 or later. He had three brothers, Ralph, Robert, and Henry, and a sister, Alice. His brother Ralph predeceased him, and his brother Robert succeeded him as 3rd Earl in 1214. The first notice of Aubrey is as a young boy witnessing his father's charters for Colne Priory.

In 1194, Aubrey was with King Richard I in France, and succeeded to the earldom on the death of his father on 26 December of the same year. In 1195, he was assessed to pay 500 marks towards the ransom of King Richard, who was being held captive by the Emperor Henry VI.

In 1197, Aubrey was again with King Richard in Normandy when a dispute was litigated between Abbot Samson of Bury St Edmunds and some fifty tenants of the Abbey, including the earl of Oxford. Ultimately, most of the tenants came to the King's court in London and acknowledged the Abbey's right to certain feudal aids. Aubrey, the last to hold out, finally capitulated when the abbot seized and sold his plough-beasts.

In 1204 Aubrey paid 200 marks for the third penny of Oxfordshire and "that he might be Earl of Oxford", a confirmation of the title which had been granted to his father in July 1141 by the Empress Matilda during a time of civil war. The title had already been confirmed to his father by Matilda's son, King Henry II, and Aubrey had been acknowledged earl of Oxford by Richard I and John. This payment, five years after John took the throne, is thus unusual.

In March 1208 Pope Innocent III placed England under an interdict. At the time of the interdict Aubrey is said to have been regarded as one of the King's "evil counsellors". In the summer of 1209 he was among the courtiers who met the Pope's agents in Dover to try to prevent King John's excommunication. Their mission failed; Innocent excommunicated the King in November of that year.

In what may have been his last military service, Aubrey was with King John's forces during a nine-week campaign in Ireland from June to August 1210.

Among other appointments, Aubrey was Keeper of the manor of Havering in 1208, Sheriff of Essex and Hertfordshire from 1208 to 1213, and steward of the Forest of Essex in 1213. On 20 June 1213 he had the King's greyhounds in his charge.

Aubrey died in 1214, in or before the month of October, and was buried at Colne Priory. He was succeeded by his younger brother, Robert de Vere, 3rd Earl of Oxford, later one of the guarantors of Magna Carta.

== Marriages and issue ==
Aubrey married twice. His first wife was the heiress Isabel de Bolebec, whose marriage his father had purchased in 1184. She died in 1206 or 1207.

Aubrey's second wife, Alice, is said to have been a daughter of Roger Bigod, 2nd Earl of Norfolk and thus his second cousin. After Aubrey's death his brother and successor, Robert de Vere, 3rd Earl of Oxford, established Alice's dower by lot, drawing two knights' fees for every one drawn by Alice. She never remarried and outlived her husband by several decades. Aubrey had no surviving issue by either of his wives.

Aubrey left an illegitimate son, Roger de Vere, who was apparently acknowledged and provided for by his father. Roger died in 1221 at Damietta on crusade.

== Footnotes ==
Peerage of England
Preceded by Aubrey de Vere III	Earl of Oxford; 1194–1214	Succeeded by Robert de Vere
