= William de Vere =

12th-century Bishop of Hereford

- Bishop of Hereford
- Appointed: 25 May 1186
- Term ended: 24 December 1198
- Predecessor: Robert Foliot
- Successor: Giles de Braose

Orders
- Ordination: 10 August 1186
- Consecration: 10 August 1186

Personal details
- Died: 24 December 1198 Herefordshire
- Buried: Hereford Cathedral
- Denomination: Catholic

William de Vere (died 1198) was Bishop of Hereford and an Augustinian canon.

== Biography ==
The son of Aubrey de Vere II and Adeliza of Clare, probably the fourth of five sons, and brother of Aubrey de Vere III first earl of Oxford, de Vere spent part of his youth at the court of King Henry I of England and his second wife, Queen Adeliza of Leuven. Little is known of his education, but he had received minor ecclesiastical orders before 1141. He was a friend of Bishop Arnulf of Liseux, and may have studied in Paris.

De Vere was promised the chancellorship of England by the Empress Matilda in the 1141 charter by which his brother was made earl, but there is no record that he served as her chancellor. He later entered the household of Archbishop Theobald of Bec of Canterbury (d. 1163). He served in the archbishop's household with near-contemporaries Thomas Becket and John of Salisbury in the 1150s. Theobald sent him on diplomatic errands to France in the early 1160s. He is thought to have served briefly as a secular canon of St. Paul's, London, about 1163, but that William de Vere may have been a member of an unrelated Ver family associated with the bishop of London in Domesday Book. De Vere became an Augustinian canon at St Osyth's Priory at Chich, Essex, for from that monastery he was recruited in 1177 by King Henry II to supervise the rebuilding of Waltham Abbey in Essex to house an Augustinian canonry. His name is one of two listed in the pipe rollss as receiving monies toward that project.

King Henry later employed de Vere as an itinerant justice, and then nominated him as Bishop of Hereford on 25 May 1186. He was consecrated on 10 August 1186. In that office he occasionally continued to serve as a royal justice under Richard I. As bishop, he is credited with having extended the east end of Hereford Cathedral, constructing the transitional retrochoir, two transept chapels, and possibly a lady chapel (the latter two areas replaced by his successors). He is also thought to have constructed the bishop's palace at Hereford. He expanded the work of his predecessors in the administration of the diocese and employed Gerald of Wales and Robert Grosseteste.

As a canon at St. Osyth's, de Vere wrote a Latin life of that saint, which now exists only in fragments recorded by antiquarian John Leland in the sixteenth century. In that work, he made references to his family. He donated a relic of St. Osyth to Waltham Abbey, and promoted the cult of that saint at Hereford Cathedral. He may have visited the Holy Land, perhaps in 1178 or in 1182–1185.

De Vere was one of several bishops who excommunicated Prince John and his supporters in 1194, and was present at Winchester Cathedral for the recoronation of King Richard I in April 1194. De Vere died in December 1198 and is buried in Hereford Cathedral, where his tomb with an effigy can be found.

== See also ==
- Bishop of Hereford (Robin Hood)

== Citations ==
Catholic Church titles
Preceded by Robert Foliot	Bishop of Hereford; 1186–1198	Succeeded by Giles de Braose
