= Castle Hedingham Priory =

Benedictine nunnery in Essex, England

Coordinates: 51.99009°N 0.588343°E

Hedingham Priory was a Benedictine nunnery in Castle Hedingham, Essex, founded in or before 1190 by Aubrey de Vere, 1st Earl of Oxford, perhaps in partnership with his third wife, Agnes of Essex. It was dedicated to the Virgin Mary, St. James, and the Holy Cross.

== History ==
The convent's first prioress was Lucy (or Lucia), named in a well-preserved, early thirteenth-century bede in which she is called the foundress of the priory, leading to much confusion, as it was assumed that she was a wife of the founder or a member of the Vere family. The convent was torched by the men of the founder's son and heir late in 1190 or early in 1191, and in punishment Aubrey IV was fined 100 marcs by the king and in atonement donated additional property to the priory in February 1191.

The small priory was one of 16 nunneries exclusively for women founded between 1165 and 1215 in southern England. By 1535, at the time of its dissolution, it was valued at only £29 12s. 10d, with a little over 250 acres (1.0 km^{2}) in small parcels in 23 manors, two churches and three advowsons. The king granted it to John de Vere, 15th Earl of Oxford, with all its possessions in 1536. No cartulary is known to have survived, only individual charters.
