= Robert de Vere =

Robert de Vere or Robert Vere may refer to:

- Robert de Vere, 3rd Earl of Oxford (1165–1221)
- Robert de Vere, 5th Earl of Oxford (1220–1296)
- Robert de Vere, 6th Earl of Oxford (1257–1331)
- Robert de Vere, Duke of Ireland, 9th Earl of Oxford (1362–1392)
- Robert de Vere, 19th Earl of Oxford (1575–1632)
- Robert Vere (died 1461), English soldier and diplomat
- Robert Vere de Vere (1872–1936), Irish judge in the British colonial service
