= John de Vere =

John de Vere may refer to:

- John de Vere, 7th Earl of Oxford (1312–1360)
- John de Vere, 12th Earl of Oxford (1408–1462)
- John de Vere, 13th Earl of Oxford (1442–1513)
- John de Vere, 14th Earl of Oxford
- John de Vere, 15th Earl of Oxford
- John de Vere, 16th Earl of Oxford
