= Castle Hedingham =

Village in Essex, England

Coordinates: 51.991°N 0.604°E

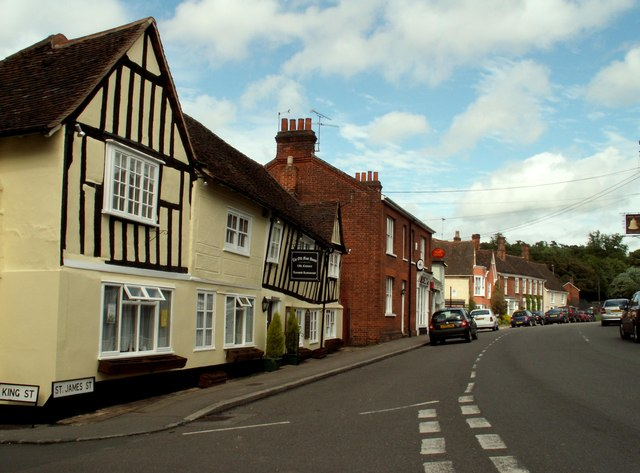
- St. James Street, Castle Hedingham, Essex

- Location within Essex
- Population: 1,186 (Parish, 2021)
- OS grid reference: TL787357
- District: Braintree
- Shire county: Essex
- Region: East
- Country: England
- Sovereign state: United Kingdom
- Post town: Halstead
- Postcode district: CO9
- Dialling code: 01787
- Police: Essex
- Fire: Essex
- Ambulance: East of England
- UK Parliament: Braintree

Castle Hedingham is a village and civil parish in northern Essex, England, located four miles west of Halstead and 3 miles southeast of Great Yeldham in the Colne Valley on the ancient road from Colchester, Essex, to Cambridge. At the 2021 census the parish had a population of 1,186.

It developed around Hedingham Castle, the ancestral seat of the de Veres, Earls of Oxford. The first earl, Aubrey de Vere III, finished the initial building of the keep and established a Benedictine nunnery, Castle Hedingham Priory, near the castle gates. Hugh de Vere, fourth earl of Oxford, purchased the right to hold a market in the town of the crown in the mid-13th century. He also founded a hospital just outside the gates of the castle around 1250.

The village's main attractions are the well preserved Norman Hedingham Castle, the Colne Valley Railway, Kirby Hall and its many timber-framed medieval buildings.

The church of St. Nicholas is late Norman and Gothic, building having commenced around 1180. The fine double hammerbeam roof is attributed to Thomas Loveday, who was responsible for work on St John's College, Cambridge. Its Romanesque wheel window and cemetery cross are remnants of the Norman church.

The church has a ring of 6 bells. https://dove.cccbr.org.uk/detail.php?tower=11865

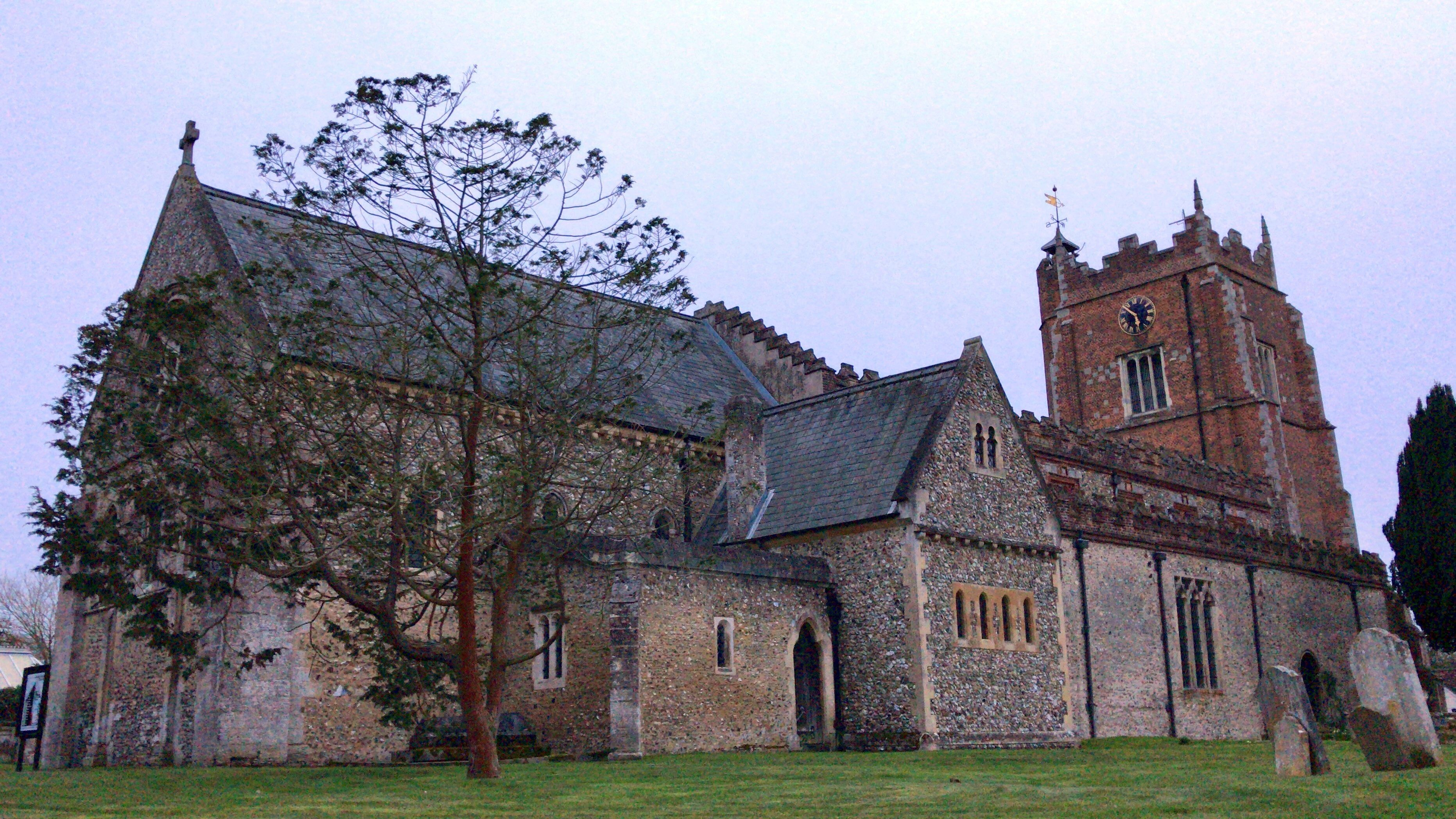
Exterior, St Nicholas' Church, Castle Hedingham

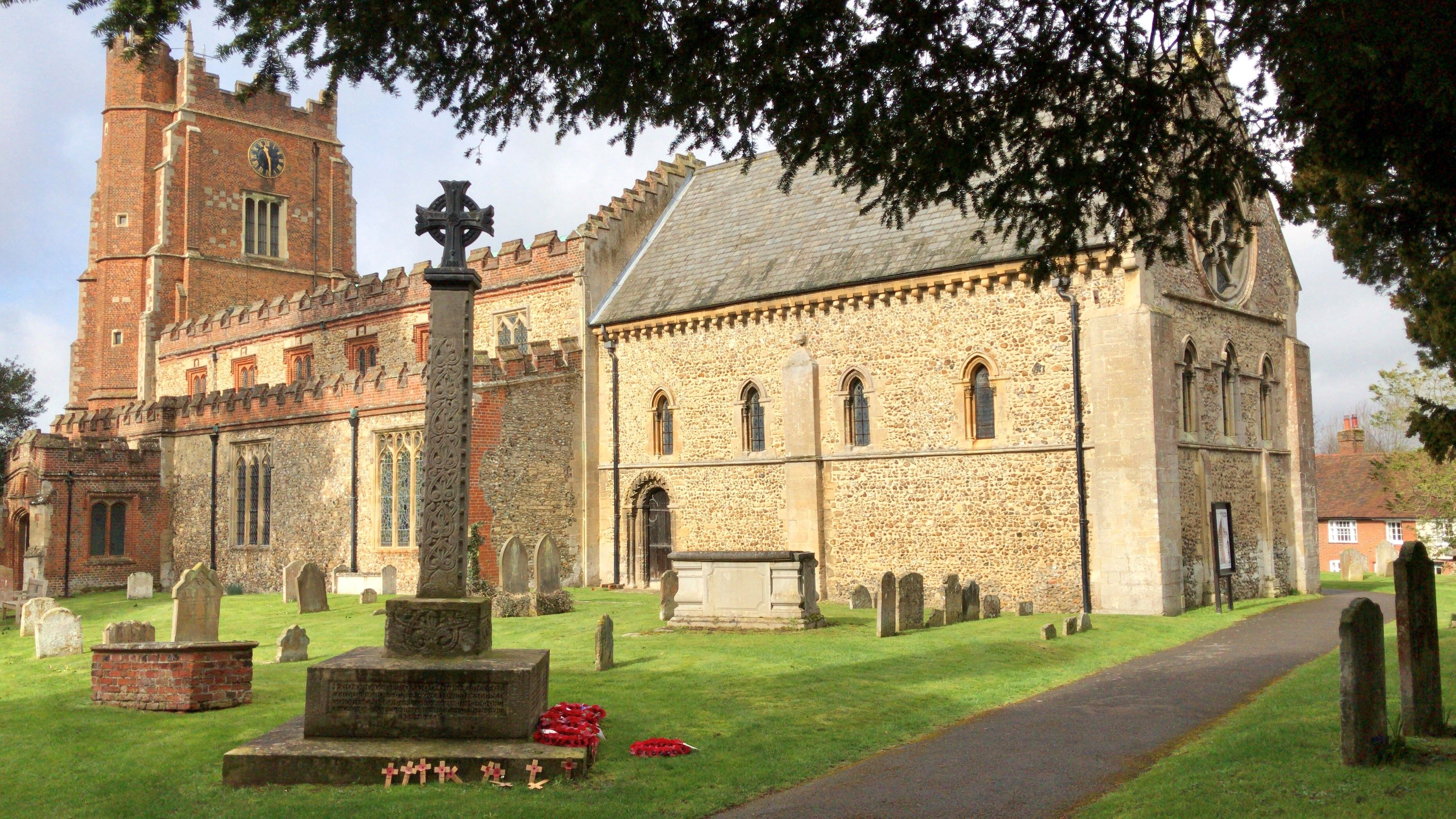
Southeast view of St Nicholas' Church, Castle Hedingham, Essex

The village was served by Sible and Castle Hedingham railway station which was opened by Colne Valley & Halstead Railway Company in 1867. The station closed in 1964 and was dismantled and rebuilt in 1974 on a new site to the north west of the village by the Colne Valley Railway Preservation Society.

Castle Hedingham Pottery was an art pottery studio run by Edward Bingham at Castle Hedingham from about 1864 until 1901.

== Notable residents ==
Sir John Hawkwood, of "The White Company" famous Knight in Florence Italy, as shown in a fresco in the Duomo painted by Paolo Uccello as a memorial to this renowned commander who earlier served under the Black Prince. Born in 1320 at Sible Hedingham died at Florence March 16, 1394-5 and after a magnificent funeral, his body was returned to England by King Richard ll. A monument was placed in St Peter church along with a chapelry in that church and in Castle Hedingham. [ Robert Coe Puritan His Ancestors and Descendants by J.B. Bartlett, pages 15-16]

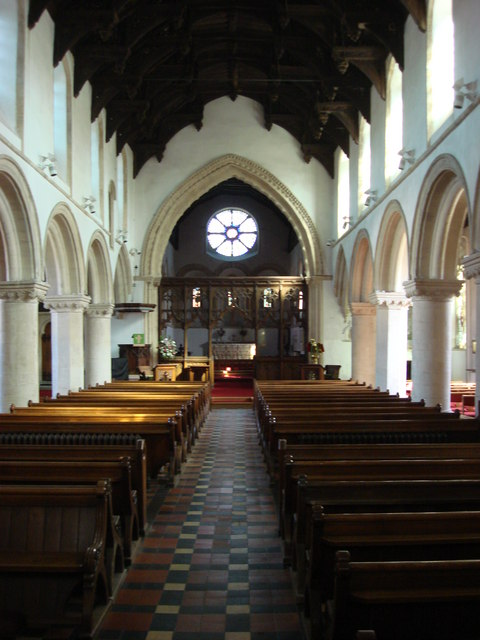
Interior of St. Nicholas' Church

- Edward Bingham, Victorian potter whose Castle Hedingham Ware has become increasingly sought after.
- Margery Blackie, doctor of medicine who was appointed as the first woman royal physician to Queen Elizabeth II.
- Sir Fowell Buxton, 1st Baronet, founder of the RSPCA, Member of Parliament and social reformer who was a leading abolitionist in the 19th century and took over William Wilberforce's leadership of the anti slavery movement in the House of Commons when the latter retired.
- Mark Catesby, naturalist who studied the flora and fauna of the New World.
- Aubrey de Vere I, holder of the entire manor of Hedingham (later Castle Hedingham) in the Domesday Book of 1086.
- Aubrey de Vere III, 1st Earl of Oxford, completed the stone keep at Hedingham.
- Robert de Vere, 3rd Earl of Oxford, one of the 25 barons of Magna Carta.
- Robert de Vere, 9th Earl of Oxford.
- John de Vere, 13th Earl of Oxford, commander of Henry Tudor's army at the Battle of Bosworth Field.
- Edward de Vere, 17th Earl of Oxford, patron of the arts, poet, courtier and proposed alternative author of the Shakespeare works
- Major-General Daniel Hoghton, British Army officer who served during the Napoleonic Wars with distinction.
- Anne Lindsay, actor and Jack Lindsay, Australian writer.
- James Majendie, Conservative Party politician.
- Lewis Majendie, Conservative Party politician.
- Musette Majendie, owner of Hedingham Castle.
- Eric Ravilious, painter, book illustrator and wood engraver.
- Tirzah Garwood, British artist and engraver (Eric Ravilous' wife)
- Sir Robert Wilson CBE FRS, astronomer.
- Henry de Vere Stacpoole, Author of The Blue Lagoon, lived at Astles, Pye Corner
- Edmund Powell, vicar of St Nicholas Church 1917 - 1921
