= Hedingham Castle =

Castle in Essex, England

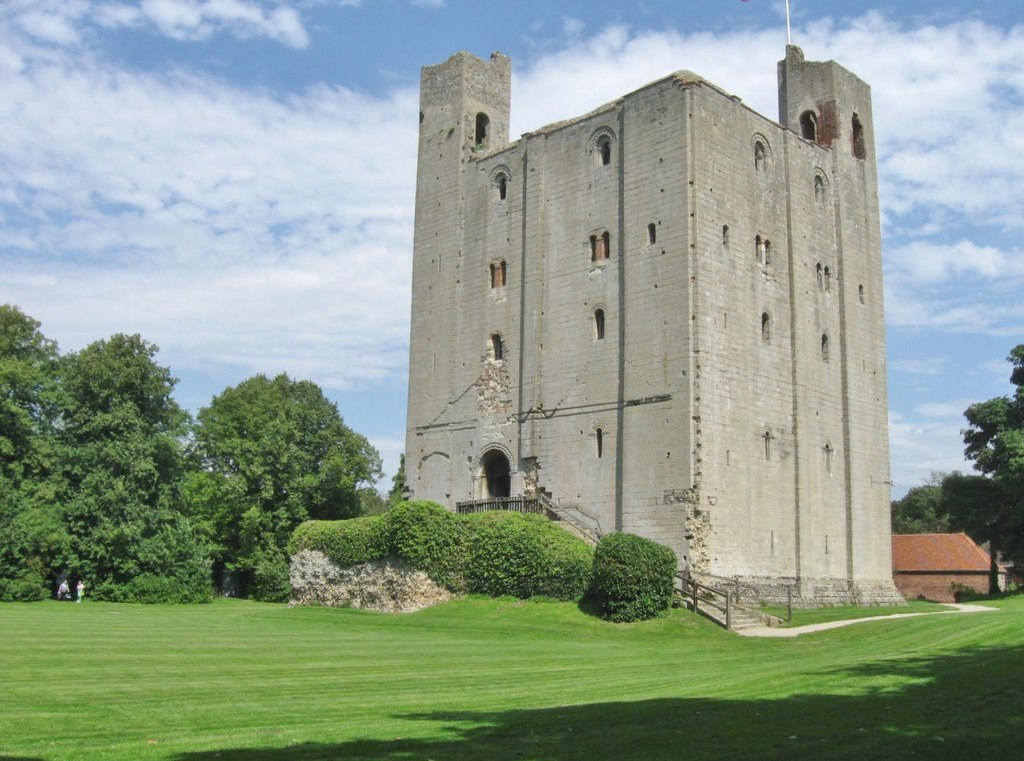
- Hedingham Castle, 2012
- Interactive map of the Hedingham Castle area

General information
- Type: Castle
- Architectural style: Romanesque
- Location: Castle Hedingham, Essex, United Kingdom
- Coordinates: 51°59′33″N 0°36′04″E
- Owner: The Lindsay family

Hedingham Castle, in the village of Castle Hedingham, Essex, is arguably the best preserved Norman keep in England. The castle fortifications and outbuildings were built around 1100, and the keep around 1140. However, the keep is the only major medieval structure that has survived, albeit less two turrets. It is a Grade I listed building and a scheduled monument. The keep is open to the public.

== Description ==
The manor of Hedingham was awarded to Aubrey de Vere I by William the Conqueror by 1086. The castle was constructed by the de Veres in the late 11th and early 12th centuries, and the keep in the 1130s and 1140s. To accommodate the existing castle, a large ditch was cut through a natural spur westward into the Colne Valley in order to form a ringwork and inner bailey; an outer bailey extended south further into the valley and what is now the modern village of Castle Hedingham. The stone keep is the only mediaeval structure to survive, and is in an excellent state of preservation.

The keep is nearly square, a common shape for Norman keeps. The east and west sides are 53 ft (16 m) long and the north–south sides about 58 ft (18 m). The main part of the keep stands more than 70 ft (21 m) tall, and the turrets rise an additional 15 to 25 ft (4.6 to 7.6 m) above the parapets, commanding the countryside around it from its elevated position atop the ringwork. The walls are about 11 ft (3.4 m) thick at the base and average 10 ft (3.0 m) thick at the top. They are constructed from flint rubble bound with lime mortar, but, very unusually for an Essex castle, are faced with ashlar stone transported from a quarry in Barnack, Northamptonshire.

The keep has five floors including the Great or Banqueting Hall with a large fireplace and a central arch extending two storeys. The top floor may have been added around the 15th century, replacing a pyramid-shaped roof. This is a recent theory, however, and many older sources have noted the similar plans of Hedingham Castle and Rochester Castle, which was begun about 1126 and has four floors and four turrets.

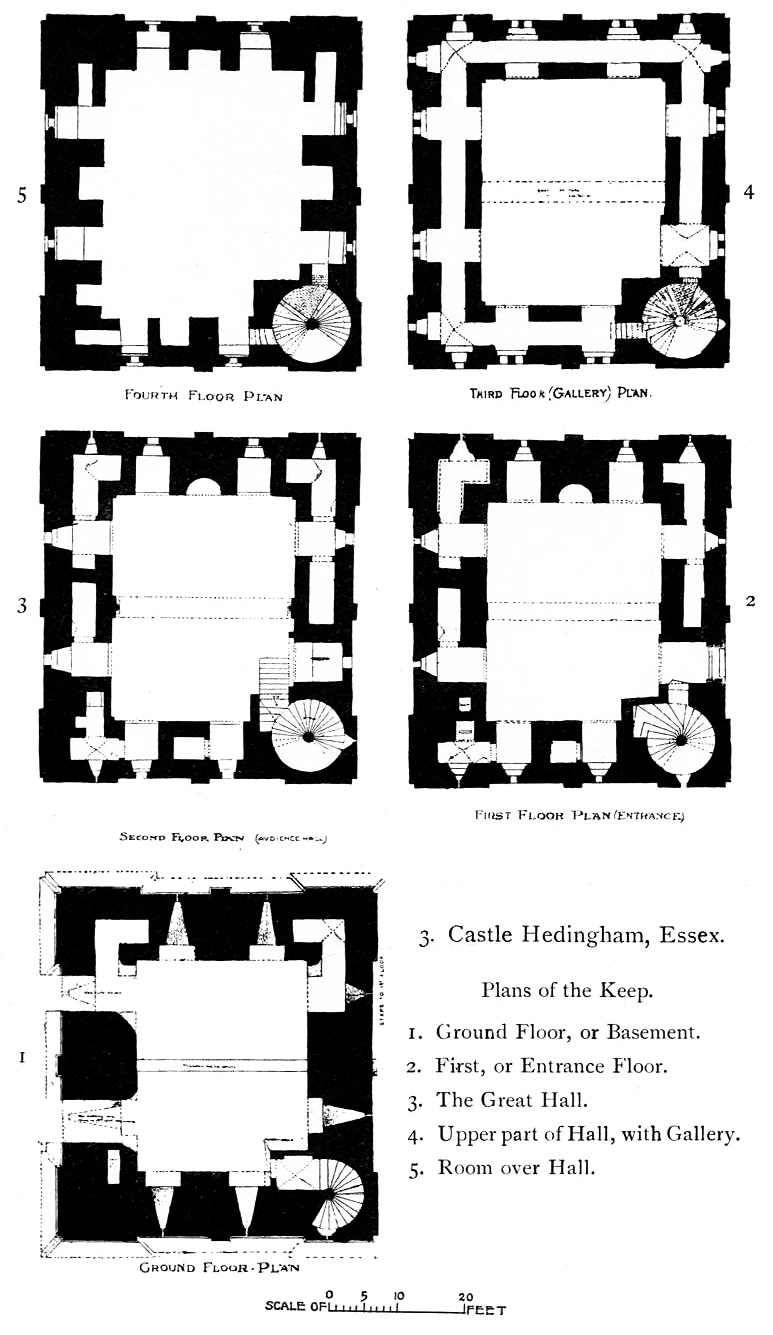
Floor plans of the keep from The Growth of the English House by John Alfred Gotch, 1909.

Changes were made in subsequent years, particularly during the Tudor period. Two of the original four corner turrets are missing. Their demise is owing to the ambitious building plans of Henry VII, which required vast amounts of stone. The outer buildings, including the hall, drawbridge and others, were replaced during the Tudor period. However, those structures have now also been lost. The only exception is the red-brick bridge of four spans that connects the inner bailey to the outer bailey, lying to the north-east of the keep. The bridge was built in the late 15th or early 16th century and has been restored several times. A chapel was previously located to the south of the stone keep within the inner bailey.

Around 1700, a Queen Anne style red-brick mansion was built in the outer bailey by Sir William Ashhurst, an MP and a former Lord Mayor of London. This was built sometime between his purchase of the property in 1693 and his death in 1719.

== History ==
Hedingham Castle may occupy the site of an earlier castle believed to have been built in the late 11th or early 12th century by Aubrey de Vere I, a Norman baron. Hedingham was one of the largest manors among those acquired by Aubrey I. The Domesday Book records that he held the manor of Hedingham by 1086, and he ordered that vineyards be planted. It became the seat of the Vere barony.

Aubrey II and Aubrey III are candidates for initiating the construction of a major stone tower at Hedingham, possibly to reflect the enhanced status of the family. In 1133 Aubrey II, son and heir of the first Aubrey, was created master chamberlain of England by Henry I. In 1141, his son and heir Aubrey was granted an earldom (Earl of Oxford) by Empress Matilda. By that time he had been Count of Guînes in what is in present-day northern France for several years by right of his wife's inheritance.

Matilda, wife of King Stephen, died at Castle Hedingham on 3 May 1152. The castle was besieged twice, in 1216 and 1217, during the dispute between King John, rebel barons, and the French prince (in both cases the sieges were short and successful for those besieging the castle).

The castle was long held by the de Vere family except for a hiatus during the Wars of the Roses. The castle was taken from the de Veres upon the execution of John de Vere, 12th Earl of Oxford, for treason against Edward IV in 1462. Edward then awarded Hedingham to his brother, Richard, Duke of Gloucester (later Richard III), who bestowed it on Henry Barley, Sheriff of Essex and Hertfordshire. Upon Barley's death in 1475, it passed to Sir John Howard, a Yorkist partisan later to become 1st Duke of Norfolk, who was, in fact, the cousin of de Vere's wife, Elizabeth Howard. After the death of Richard III at the Battle of Bosworth Field in 1485, the new king, Henry VII, returned Hedingham to the de Veres in the person of Lancastrian supporter John de Vere, 13th Earl of Oxford.

In 1713, the castle was purchased by William Ashhurst; after his death in 1720, the estate passed to his great-great-granddaughter, Margaret Elizabeth Lindsay, the wife of Lewis Majendie. The Majendie family owned Hedingham Castle for 250 years until Musette Majendie left it to her cousin, The Honourable Thomas Lindsay, descended from the de Veres through both maternal and paternal lines. His son Jason Lindsay and wife Demetra now live at Hedingham Castle with their children.

== Present day use ==
While Hedingham Castle remains a family home, the Norman keep and grounds are open to the public from Easter to October. Educational school visits take place throughout the year. The castle grounds are a venue for jousting, archery, falconry, re-enactment battles, fairs, classic and vintage car shows, music concerts and theatre productions. The castle and associated buildings are used for ceremonies and parties.

The castle has been described as "the best preserved Norman keep in England."

== Filming and photography ==
Hedingham Castle was the location for episode 2 of The Landscape of Man aired on Channel 4 in 2010, in which the castle grounds and gardens, which had been left to become a wilderness throughout the 20th century, were restored.

The castle has also been a location for the feature film The Reckoning (2004) and for the BBC series Ivanhoe (1997). In 2001, British pop group Steps filmed part of the music video (which was largely animated) for their single, "Words Are Not Enough" inside the castle.

The documentaries Made in Britain (2005) with Fred Dibnah, The Shakespeare Theory (2013) with Derek Jacobi and A History of Britain with Simon Schama have used Hedingham Castle as a location.

The castle also appeared in a 1997 photo-shoot for Vanity Fair featuring Alexander McQueen and Isabella Blow; the photograph can be seen hanging in the National Portrait Gallery, London.

The castle serves as the location of John Cleese's The Dinosaur Hour on GB News.
