= Waldingfield =

Waldingfield may refer to:

- Great Waldingfield, Suffolk, England
- Little Waldingfield, Suffolk, England
