= Hatfield Regis Priory =

Priory in Hatfield Broad Oak, Essex, England

Coordinates: 51.82781°N 0.24271°E

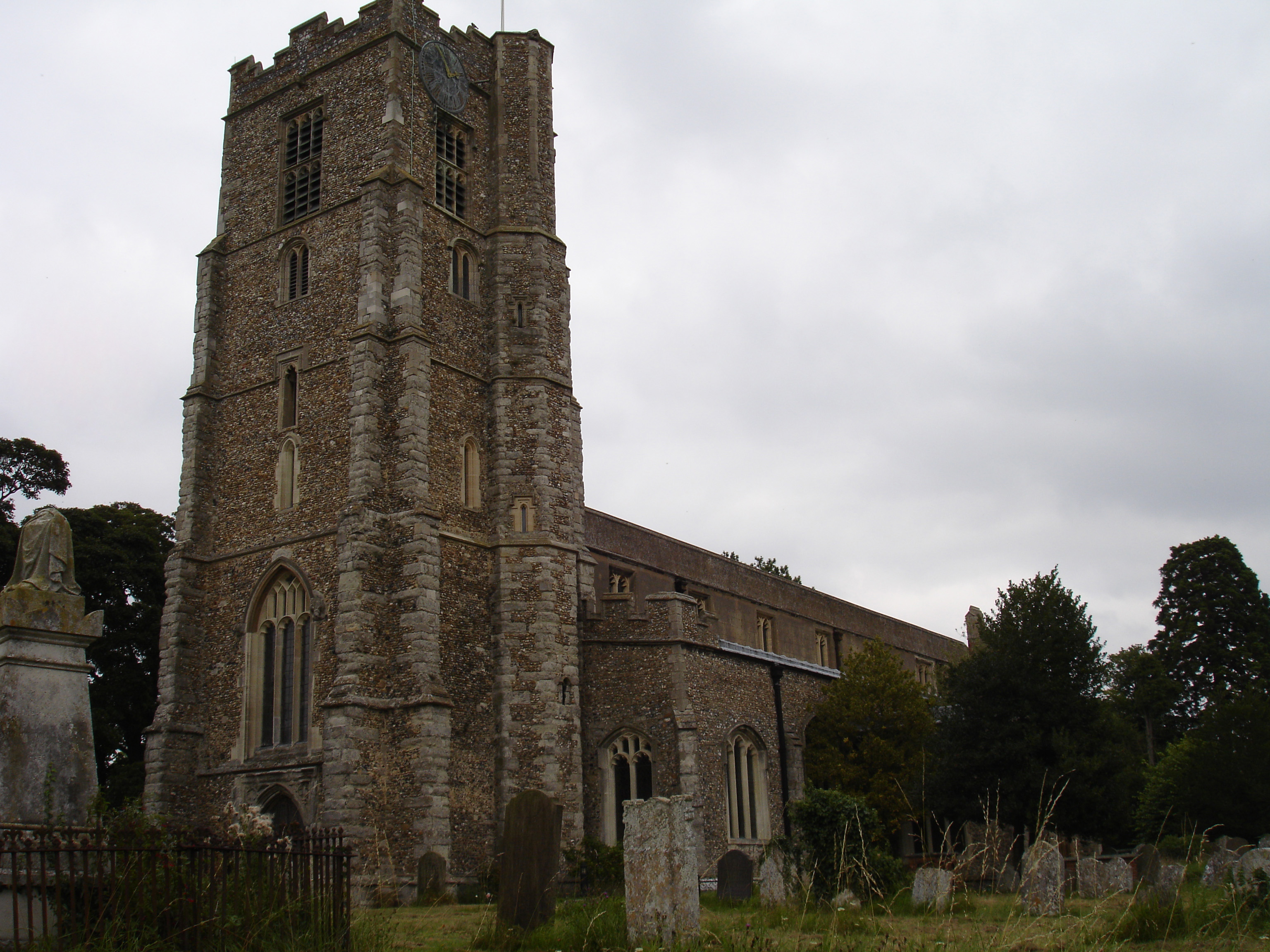
St Mary's parish church, Hatfield Broad Oak, which incorporates parts of the former priory church

Hatfield Broad Oak Priory, or Hatfield Regis Priory, is a former Benedictine priory in Hatfield Broad Oak, Essex, England. Founded by 1139, it was dissolved in 1536 as part of Henry VIII's dissolution of the monasteries.

== History ==
The large settlement of Hatfield was well established by the time of the Norman Conquest, and the Domesday Book lists the presence of a Saxon church. At one time a royal manor of Harold I, it fell into the possession of William I at the Norman Conquest. Popular for hunting in the neighbouring forest, the royal estate came to be known as Hatfield Regis (Latin for the king's Hatfield).

The Benedictine monastery itself was founded in or before 1139, one of the five religious communities of that order to be founded in Essex. The priory was a daughter house of the Breton monastery of Notre-Dame-en-Saint-Melaine de Rennes in Rennes, and was dedicated to "God, St Mary, and St. Melanius Redonensis". It was thus considered an "alien priory" as it was subordinate to a monastery outside England.

In around 1230 a fire destroyed part of the priory church, for whose repairs Henry III granted ten oaks each from the forests of Hatfield and Wristle.

John Lydgate, the poet, was elected prior in 1423 but resigned the office a few years later to concentrate on his travels and writing.

=== Disputes ===
A dispute over tithes from the royal manor of Hatfield granted to the Augustinian canons of St. Botolph, Colchester, by King Henry I continued for decades. A compromise was established by two clerical commissioners appointed by the pope in 1194, but the issue was not entirely resolved for several more years.

Another dispute arose over the appointment of the prior. Patronage of the priory always belonged to the de Veres, earls of Oxford. The de Vere earls of Oxford and the abbot of St. Melanie both claimed the right, resulting in a series of unpleasant episodes in 1235. The matter was appealed to Rome, and in 1236 Pope Gregory IX ordered commissioners to hear the matter. A final settlement was reached eighteen years later. On the death of the prior, the Hatfield monks were to ask permission of the earl of Oxford to hold an election. The new prior would be presented to the earl, who would request his confirmation by the bishop of London. The prior was to notify the abbot and convent of Rennes of the death of his predecessor and of his own election and confirmation. This is an example of an assertion of practical independence by an English cell of a foreign monastery.

The conventual church was built, or rebuilt, in the first part of the fourteenth century. The priory reached its peak in the first half of the fourteenth century with its great church, 230 feet in length, dominating the local countryside. Roger de Wautham, canon of St. Paul's, London, donated precious vessels for the use of the abbey and of the parish church."Houses of Benedictine monks: Priory of Hatfield Regis or Broadoak.

=== Dissolution ===
The priory was dissolved in 1536 by Henry VIII's Dissolution of the Monasteries. At the time only the prior and four monks lived there, though had thirty servants to attend to their needs. The tithes and patronage were initially granted to Barking Abbey but after Barking was dissolved they were given to Trinity College, Cambridge, by Henry VIII in 1546. The tomb effigy of Robert de Vere, 3rd Earl of Oxford was reportedly moved from the priory chapel to the parish church at Hatfield.

Some parts of the priory church remain as part of St Mary's parish church. The remaining buildings were dismantled and no trace remains of them above ground where they stood in the field to the north of the church.

== See also ==
- List of English abbeys, priories and friaries serving as parish churches
