= Henry of Essex =

Norman nobleman in England

Henry of Essex or Henry de Essex (died c. 1170) was an Anglo-Norman nobleman who was feudal baron of Rayleigh in Essex (by inheritance) and of Haughley in Suffolk (by right of his second wife). He served as one of the royal constables during the reigns of Kings Stephen and Henry II by right of his second wife, which office included the duty of bearing the royal standard to indicate the location of the king when on campaign or in battle. In 1163 he was convicted as a traitor, having been defeated in trial by battle, and took the habit of a monk, spending his last years at Reading Abbey.

== Life ==
Henry was the son and heir of Robert fitz Swein of Essex, a descendant of the pre-Conquest landowner Robert fitz Wimarch who was favoured by King Edward the Confessor.

Henry is mentioned in several chronicles, including that of Jocelin of Brakelond. His influence at the royal court was greatest during the reign of Stephen, but it continued into the early years of Henry II's. He served Henry as Sheriff of Bedfordshire and Buckinghamshire from 1156 to 1159, and as a justiciar, as well as being his constable. Henry participated in the king's Toulouse campaign in the spring and summer of 1159.

Henry was alleged (Note: L. F. Salzman, in his biography of Henry II, considers it probable that it was a trumped-up charge by De Montfort) to have dropped the royal standard in a Welsh ambush during Henry II's campaign into Wales of 1157. As royal constable, his office required that he hold the standard to indicate the king's position during any military engagement. Dropping the standard seemed to signal the king's death. At the royal court held at Easter, 1163, Henry was accused of treason for that act by Robert de Montfort, a claimant to the Montfort estate of Haughley. The two men fought a judicial duel a few months later. Jocelin details Henry's judicial duel with Robert de Montfort (a rival for Henry's wife's inheritance) on Fry's Island in the River Thames at Reading. Henry's body was carried senseless from the site of the duel by monks of the nearby Reading Abbey, but he survived and took the Benedictine cowl. As he was a convicted traitor, however, his estates and offices were forfeit, and his family was disgraced. Henry was allowed to remain as a monk at Reading Abbey for the rest of his life.

Henry is thought to have died at Reading Abbey in the same year that Archbishop Thomas Becket was murdered, 1170.

== Family ==
Henry married first Cecily, daughter of Roger de Valognes; they had least at two sons, Henry and Hugh. His second wife was Alice, probably the daughter and heiress of Robert de Ver, the royal constable (d. circa 1151). It is unknown which wife was the mother of Henry's daughter, Agnes, who married Aubrey de Vere, first Earl of Oxford, but Cecily seems most likely.

Honorary titles
Preceded by Unknown	Lord High Constable of England; 1150–1154	Succeeded by Unknown
