= Aubrey de Vere I =

Tenant-in-chief in England

Aubrey (Albericus) de Vere (died circa 1112–1113) was a tenant-in-chief in England of William the Conqueror in 1086, as well as a tenant of Geoffrey de Montbray, bishop of Coutances and of Count Alan, lord of Richmond. A much later source named his father as Alphonsus.

== Biography ==
Aubrey's origins are obscure, and various regions have been proposed for his birthplace, from Zeeland to Brittany. He may have been Norman, possibly from the region of Ver in the Cotentin peninsula of western Normandy, or Ver-sur-Mer, but the evidence is such that no certainty is possible. Late medieval sources put forward claims of descent from Charlemagne through the Counts of Flanders or Guînes. In fact, the only connection of the Veres of England with Guînes in Flanders was through a short-lived marriage; Aubrey I's grandson Aubrey de Vere III married Beatrice, heiress to the county of Guînes, in the 12th century, but there was no issue, and their marriage was annulled after six or seven years.

In the Domesday Book, Aubrey is listed as "Aubrey the chamberlain" and "Aubrey the queen's chamberlain" as well as Aubrey de Vere. He and his wife held land in nine counties in 1086. Both were accused of some unauthorized land seizures. Aubrey's estates were valued at approximately £300, putting him in roughly the middle ranks of the post-conquest barons of England in terms of landed wealth. He served King Henry I in the first decade of his reign as a chamberlain and local justiciar in the counties of Berkshire and Northamptonshire.

Sometime in or before 1104, Aubrey's eldest son Geoffrey, fell ill and was tended at Abingdon Abbey in Berkshire by the royal physician, Abbot Faritius. The youth appeared to have recovered but suffered a relapse, died, and was buried at the abbey. At the dying request of Geoffrey, Aubrey gave Abingdon Abbey his church of Kensington with its appurtenances of 2 hides and 1 yardland. His parents then founded a cell of Abingdon on land they donated for the purpose: Colne Priory, Essex. Within a year of the formal dedication in March 1111, Aubrey I joined that community and died soon. His youngest son William died not long after his father. Both were buried at the priory, establishing it as the Vere family mausoleum. Aubrey de Vere II then succeeded to his father's estates.

Aubrey was married by 1086. As his spouse's name is recorded as Beatrice in 1104 and Beatrice is named as the mother of his eldest son, she was almost certainly his wife in 1086. Beatrice attended the formal ceremony for the founding of Earl's Colne Priory. Besides sons Geoffrey, Aubrey II, and William mentioned above, the couple's children included Roger and Robert.

== Estates ==
The principal estates held by Aubrey de Vere in 1086: Castle Hedingham, Beauchamp [Walter], Great Bentley, Great Canfield, Earls Colne, [White] Colne, and Dovercourt, Essex; Aldham, Belstead, Lavenham, and Waldingfield, Suffolk; Castle Camps, Hildersham, Silverley, and Wilbraham, Cambridgeshire. He possessed houses and acreage in Colchester and a house in Winchester. As tenant of Geoffrey bishop of Coutances, he held Kensington, Middlesex; Scaldwell and Wadenhoe, Northamptonshire. Of the barony of Count Alan of Brittany, he held the manors of Beauchamp Roding, Canfield, and West Wickham, Essex. His wife held Aldham, Essex, in her own right of Odo bishop of Bayeux. The couple both were accused by Domesday jurors of expansion into Little Maplestead, Essex. Aubrey's seizures or questionable right of possession to estates included Manuden, Essex; Great Hemingford, Huntingdonshire; and Swaffham, Cambridgeshire. (Counties given are those of Domesday Book.)
