= Aubrey de Vere, 1st Earl of Oxford =

English noble

Aubrey de Vere
- 1st Earl of Oxford
- Born: c. 1115
- Died: 26 December 1194
- Noble family: de Vere
- Spouses: Beatrice; Euphemia; Agnes of Essex
- Issue: Aubrey de Vere, 2nd Earl of Oxford; Ralph de Vere; Robert de Vere, 3rd Earl of Oxford; Henry de Vere; Alice de Vere
- Father: Aubrey de Vere
- Mother: Alice de Clare

Aubrey de Vere, 1st Earl of Oxford (c. 1115 – 26 December 1194) was an English noble involved in the succession conflict between King Stephen and Empress Matilda in the mid-twelfth century.

Aubrey was the son of Aubrey de Vere, Lord Great Chamberlain and Sheriff of London, and Alice (died c. 1163), a daughter of Gilbert de Clare.

In 1136 or 1137, Aubrey married Beatrice, the daughter of Henry, Constable of Bourbourg, and the granddaughter and heiress of Manasses, Count of Guînes in the Pas de Calais. After the death of Manasses late in 1138, Aubrey travelled to Guînes, did homage to Thierry, Count of Flanders, and was made Count of Guînes by right of his wife. The marriage, however, may not have been consummated, due to the poor health of Beatrice.

Aubrey succeeded as Lord Great Chamberlain on 15 May 1141, after his father had been slain by a mob in London during the civil war between King Stephen and the Empress Matilda. King Stephen had been captured at the Battle of Lincoln in February 1141, so Aubrey did homage to the Empress. His brother-in-law, the Earl of Essex, appears to have negotiated the grant of an earldom to Aubrey in July 1141, which grant was confirmed by Henry FitzEmpress in Normandy. The latter charter provided that Aubrey would be Earl of Cambridgeshire, with the third penny, unless that county was held by the King of Scots, in which case he was to have a choice of four other titles. In the event, Aubrey took the title of Earl of Oxford. Earl Geoffrey made his peace with King Stephen when the king regained his freedom late in 1141, and most likely Aubrey did as well.

In 1143, however, the King arrested both earls at St. Albans. Both were forced to surrender their castles to the King to regain their liberty. The Earl of Essex retaliated by rebelling against the king; it appears that Aubrey did not actively or openly support his brother-in-law.

At some time between 1144 and 1146, the Constable of Bourbourg arranged a divorce for his daughter Beatrice with Aubrey's consent, after which Oxford ceased to be Count of Guînes.

In or before 1151, Aubrey married Euphemia. King Stephen and his wife, Queen Maud, gave the manor of Ickleton, Cambridgeshire, as Euphemia's marriage portion. The marriage was short-lived; Euphemia was dead by 1154, leaving no known issue. She was buried at Colne Priory. On 3 May 1152 Queen Maud died at Aubrey's seat of Castle Hedingham, and in the winter of 1152–1153 Aubrey was with the King at the siege of Wallingford, attesting important charters in 1153 as "earl Aubrey".

In 1162 or 1163, Aubrey took as his third wife Agnes, the daughter of Henry of Essex, lord of Rayleigh. At the time of the marriage, Agnes was probably aged twelve. Soon after their marriage, Aubrey's father-in-law was accused of treason and fought (and lost, although he survived and retired to a monastery) a judicial duel. By 1165, he attempted to have the marriage annulled, allegedly because Agnes had been betrothed to his brother, Geoffrey de Vere, but probably in reality because her father had been disgraced and ruined. Aubrey reportedly 'kept his wife shut up and did not allow her to attend church or go out, and refused to cohabit with her', according to the letter the bishop of London wrote to the Pope about the case when the young countess appealed to the Roman Curia. The pope sided with Agnes and declared the marriage valid, but the earl continued to refuse to take her back as his wife. Agnes's friends appealed to the Bishop of London, and ultimately to Pope Alexander III, who, in 1171 or 1172, directed the bishop to order Oxford to restore her to her conjugal rights or to suffer interdiction and excommunication. With Agnes, Aubrey eventually had four sons, Aubrey de Vere, 2nd Earl of Oxford, Ralph, Robert de Vere, 3rd Earl of Oxford, and Henry, and a daughter, Alice.

Aubrey served during the civil war of 1173–1174, helping to repel a force under Robert de Beaumont, 3rd Earl of Leicester, which landed in Suffolk on 29 September 1173. He was present on 3 September 1189 at the coronation of King Richard I.

In 1184 Aubrey obtained the wardship of the person of Isabel de Bolebec, daughter of Walter de Bolebec, but not the custody of her lands. In 1190, he paid 500 marks for the right to marry her to his eldest son and heir, Aubrey de Vere, later 2nd Earl of Oxford.

Aubrey died on 26 December 1194 and was buried at Colne Priory. His third wife survived him, and later was buried by his side.

Aubrey was a benefactor to several religious houses, including Colne Priory and Hatfield Regis Priory. He and his wife founded a small nunnery at Castle Hedingham in Essex.

== Footnotes ==
Peerage of England
New creation	Earl of Oxford; 1141–1194	Succeeded by Aubrey de Vere
Preceded by Aubrey de Vere	Lord Great Chamberlain; 1141–1194	Succeeded by Aubrey de Vere
