= Earl of Oxford =

Dormant title in the Peerage of England

- Creation date: 1141
- Created by: Empress Matilda
- Peerage: Peerage of England
- First holder: Aubrey de Vere, 1st Earl of Oxford
- Last holder: Aubrey de Vere, 20th Earl of Oxford
- Seat: Hedingham Castle
- Motto: Vero Nihil Verius ("Nothing more true than truth")
- Arms

Earl of Oxford is a dormant title in the Peerage of England, first created for Aubrey de Vere by the Empress Matilda in 1141. His family was to hold the title for more than five and a half centuries, until the death of the 20th Earl in 1703. The de Veres were also hereditary holders of the office of Lord Great Chamberlain of England from 1133 until the death of the 18th Earl in 1625. Their primary seat was Hedingham Castle in Essex, but they held lands in southern England and the Midlands, particularly in eastern England. The actual earldom was called "Oxenford" until at least the end of the 17th century. Medieval sources thus refer to "my lord of Oxenford" when speaking of the earl.

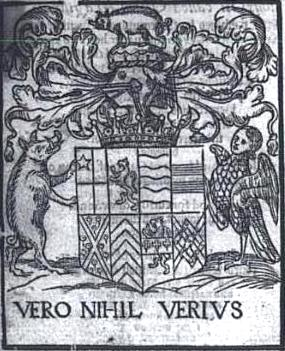
1574 woodcut showing the heraldic achievement of Edward de Vere, 17th Earl of Oxford, with Latin canting motto Vero Nihil Verius ("Nothing more true than truth")

== Earls of Oxford (from 1141) ==
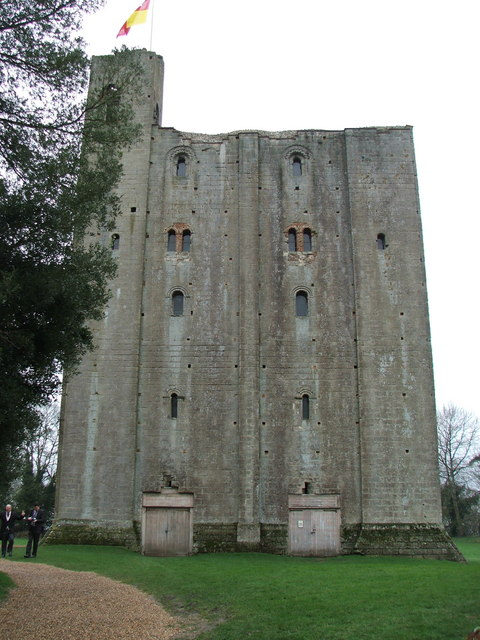
Hedingham Castle in Essex, primary seat of the Earls of Oxford

Soon after his father's death in 1141, Aubrey III de Vere was recruited by Empress Matilda. Aubrey's brother-in-law, Geoffrey de Mandeville first earl of Essex, apparently negotiated the offer of the earldom of Cambridge, with a secondary offer of one of four counties if Cambridgeshire was claimed by her kinsman. Aubrey held no land in Oxfordshire at the time, but his eldest son Aubrey IV was to marry an heiress with manors in that county. Aubrey IV was supposedly an ally of King John, while his brother Robert, the 3rd Earl was one of the 25 barons of Magna Carta. His descendant, another Robert, the 9th Earl, was a favourite of King Richard II who created him Duke of Ireland. John the 13th Earl was a Lancastrian during the War of the Roses and Henry Tudor's commander at the Battle of Bosworth Field in 1485. The 17th Earl has become the most famous of the line because of his emergence as a popular alternative candidate as the actual author of the works of William Shakespeare (see Oxfordian theory of Shakespeare authorship). The 17th Earl was a ward and later son-in-law of Lord Burghley, Queen Elizabeth I's Secretary of State. On the death of the 20th Earl, without identifiable heirs male, the title became dormant.

On 26 February 1462 John de Vere, 12th Earl of Oxford, as a supporter of the House of Lancaster, having been convicted earlier that month for treason, was beheaded by the English King Edward IV, as part of a conspiracy. His eldest son, Aubrey, had been beheaded six days earlier.

The earls of Oxford held no subsidiary titles, and so their heirs apparent were styled by invented courtesy titles: initially Lord Vere, and later Viscount Bolebec (sometimes spelt Viscount Bulbeck).

The principal Oxford coat of arms or shield was quarterly gules and or (red and gold, depicted yellow) with an argent (silver, depicted white) five-pointed star called a mullet or molet in the first canton. By de Vere family tradition this molet is said to refer to a reappearance of the Star of Bethlehem which showed itself to an earlier De Vere while on a Crusade and thus led him to victory. In the 14th and 15th centuries, the family livery worn by their retainers was orange/tawney decorated with a white molet. A later badge associated with the De Veres is a blue boar. A later shield variation of the De Vere white molet has a smaller blue molet located within the white one but this may be a simple cadency mark – in heraldry the molet is also used in any family to indicate the third son of a title holder. The third son bears his father's arms differenced with a molet.

A confusion between the de Vere white molet and Edward IV's sunburst and white rose is said to have led to the friendly fire incident between Neville's men and De Vere's men at the Battle of Barnet in 1471. Fighting in fog, the Nevilles (former Yorkists) fired on their De Vere (staunch Lancastrian) allies and thus brought about the collapse of the Lancastrian centre and right. Both contingents began to rout crying "treachery".

== List of title holders ==
- Aubrey de Vere, 1st Earl of Oxford, (c. 1115–1194)
- Aubrey de Vere, 2nd Earl of Oxford (c. 1164–1214)
- Robert de Vere, 3rd Earl of Oxford (c. 1173–1221)
- Hugh de Vere, 4th Earl of Oxford (c. 1208–1263)
- Robert de Vere, 5th Earl of Oxford (1240–1296) (forfeit 1265, restored soon after)
- Robert de Vere, 6th Earl of Oxford (1257–1331)
- John de Vere, 7th Earl of Oxford (1312–1360)
- Thomas de Vere, 8th Earl of Oxford (1337–1371)
- Robert de Vere, 9th Earl of Oxford (1362–1392) (forfeit 1388)
- Aubrey de Vere, 10th Earl of Oxford (1340–1400) (restored 1393)
- Richard de Vere, 11th Earl of Oxford (1385–1417)
- John de Vere, 12th Earl of Oxford (1408–1462)
- John de Vere, 13th Earl of Oxford (1442–1513) (forfeit 1475, restored 1485)
- John de Vere, 14th Earl of Oxford (1499–1526)
- John de Vere, 15th Earl of Oxford (1482–1540)
- John de Vere, 16th Earl of Oxford (1516–1562)
- Edward de Vere, 17th Earl of Oxford (1550–1604)
- Henry de Vere, 18th Earl of Oxford (1593–1625)
- Robert de Vere, 19th Earl of Oxford (1575–1632)
- Aubrey de Vere, 20th Earl of Oxford (1627–1703) (dormant 1703)

== Family tree ==
de Vere family tree

Earl of Oxford, 1141
Aubrey de Vere d. 1194; 1st Earl of Oxford
Aubrey de Vere d. 1214; 2nd Earl of Oxford	Robert de Vere d. 1221; 3rd Earl of Oxford
Hugh de Vere d. 1263; 4th Earl of Oxford
Robert de Vere d. 1296; 5th Earl of Oxford
Robert de Vere; 1257–1331; 6th Earl of Oxford	Alfonso de Vere d. 1328
John de Vere; 1312–1360; 7th Earl of Oxford
Thomas de Vere d. 1371; 8th Earl of Oxford	Aubrey de Vere; 1338–1400; 10th Earl of Oxford
Marquess of Dublin, 1385; Duke of Ireland, 1386
Robert de Vere; 1362–1392; Duke of Ireland, etc. 9th Earl of Oxford	Richard de Vere; 1385–1417; 11th Earl of Oxford
Dukedom of Ireland and Marquessate of Dublin forfeit, 1388
John de Vere; 1408–1462; 12th Earl of Oxford	Robert de Vere
John de Vere; 1442–1513; 13th Earl of Oxford	George de Vere	John de Vere
John de Vere; 1499–1526; 14th Earl of Oxford	John de Vere d. 1540; 15th Earl of Oxford
John de Vere; 1516–1562; 16th Earl of Oxford	Aubrey de Vere (b. 1519)
Edward de Vere; 1550–1604; 17th Earl of Oxford	Hugh de Vere
Henry de Vere; 1593–1625; 18th Earl of Oxford	Robert de Vere; 1575–1632; 19th Earl of Oxford
Aubrey de Vere; 1627–1703; 20th Earl of Oxford

== Earls of Oxford and Earl Mortimer (1711) ==
The title Earl of Oxford and Earl Mortimer was created in the Peerage of Great Britain for Robert Harley in 1711. It became extinct in 1853.

== Earls of Oxford and Asquith (1925) ==
After the extinction of the earls of Oxford and earls Mortimer, former Prime Minister H. H. Asquith was keen to choose "Earl of Oxford" for his own title. As an earldom was then traditional for former prime ministers, and Asquith had a number of connections with the city of Oxford, it seemed a logical choice and had the king's support. The proposal greatly offended the descendants of the earls, however, and, in the face of their opposition, another title had to be chosen – "Earl of Oxford and Asquith". For information on this creation, see Earl of Oxford and Asquith.

== See also ==
- Earl of Oxford's case
- Countess of Oxford (disambiguation)
- Duke of St. Albans
- Lord Great Chamberlain
