= Duke of Ireland =

Title created in 1386 for Robert de Vere by Richard II of England

Dukedom of Ireland
- Creation date: 1386
- Creation: First
- Created by: King Richard II
- Peerage: Peerage of England
- First holder: Robert de Vere
- Subsidiary titles: Marquess of Dublin; Earl of Oxford

Duke of Ireland is a title that was created in 1386 for Robert de Vere, 9th Earl of Oxford (1362–1392), the favourite of King Richard II of England, who had previously been created Marquess of Dublin. Both were peerages for one life only. At this time, only the Pale of Ireland (the Lordship of Ireland) was under English control. Despite its name, the Dukedom of Ireland is generally considered to have been one in the Peerage of England, and is the first time that a ducal title was created for someone who was not a close relative of the king.

The arms with three crowns that were granted to Robert as an augmentation to his arms in 1386 continued to be used for nearly a century as the arms of the Lordship of Ireland.

Robert fell from favour shortly after receiving the title, resulted in forfeiture of the first creation in 1388.

== Family tree ==
de Vere family tree

Earl of Oxford, 1141
Aubrey de Vere d. 1194; 1st Earl of Oxford
Aubrey de Vere d. 1214; 2nd Earl of Oxford | Robert de Vere d. 1221; 3rd Earl of Oxford
Hugh de Vere d. 1263; 4th Earl of Oxford
Robert de Vere d. 1296; 5th Earl of Oxford
Robert de Vere; 1257–1331; 6th Earl of Oxford | Alfonso de Vere d. 1328
John de Vere; 1312–1360; 7th Earl of Oxford
Thomas de Vere d. 1371; 8th Earl of Oxford | Aubrey de Vere; 1338–1400; 10th Earl of Oxford
Marquess of Dublin, 1385; Duke of Ireland, 1386
Robert de Vere; 1362–1392; Duke of Ireland, etc. 9th Earl of Oxford | Richard de Vere; 1385–1417; 11th Earl of Oxford
Dukedom of Ireland and Marquessate of Dublin forfeit, 1388
John de Vere; 1408–1462; 12th Earl of Oxford | Robert de Vere
John de Vere; 1442–1513; 13th Earl of Oxford | George de Vere | John de Vere
John de Vere; 1499–1526; 14th Earl of Oxford | John de Vere d. 1540; 15th Earl of Oxford
John de Vere; 1516–1562; 16th Earl of Oxford | Aubrey de Vere (b. 1519)
Edward de Vere; 1550–1604; 17th Earl of Oxford | Hugh de Vere
Henry de Vere; 1593–1625; 18th Earl of Oxford | Robert de Vere; 1575–1632; 19th Earl of Oxford
Aubrey de Vere; 1627–1703; 20th Earl of Oxford

== See also ==
- Earl of Oxford
- High King of Ireland
- King of Ireland
- President of Ireland
