= Sir Nicholas de Loveyne =

- Died: 24 September 1375
- Buried: Abbey of St Mary of Graces, Tower Hill
- Noble family: De Loveyne
- Spouses: Margaret de Pulteney (a widow); Margaret de Vere
- Issue: Nicholas de Loveyne; Margaret de Loveyne

Sir Nicholas de Loveyne (died 24 September 1375) was a major English property owner and courtier, who held a number of senior positions in the service of King Edward III.

== Background ==
The parentage of Sir Nicholas de Loveyne (Lovayne/Lovaine/Lovain/Louveyne) has not been firmly established. There is evidence that suggests he may have been a son of Sir Thomas de Loveyne, whose own father, Sir Matthew de Loveyne, held land in Little Easton, Essex in 1300.

Writing at the end of the 18th century, Edward Hasted stated that Nicholas "was a descendant of the noble family of Lovaine, a younger branch of the duke of Lorraine. Godfrey de Lovaine, having that surname from the place of his birth, possessed lands in England in right of his mother, grand daughter of king Stephen."

He married twice, both of his wives having the Christian name Margaret. This has been one reason for confusion about his marriages and the associated relatives, a subject that is comprehensively discussed with extensive reference to original sources in two articles by Walter Lee Sheppard Jr.

Accounts of the activities of Nicholas and his relations appear in numerous other printed and online publications. Amongst the former is a substantial proportion of "Godstone: a parish history". However, this book was written before some of its conclusions were challenged by Walter Lee Sheppard's articles.

== First Marriage ==
Sir Nicholas’ first wife was Margaret, daughter of John de Bereford, a citizen of London, and widow of Sir John de Pulteney, who died on 8 June 1349. Margaret's marriage to Nicholas evidently took place between that date and 1 September 1350. On 12 October of the same year Nicholas obtained custody of the lands and marriage of William de Pulteney, the son and heir of Margaret's first husband. William de Pulteney died on 20 January 1366/7 and it appears from the evidence given at an inquisition post mortem held on 2 July 1367 that his mother was still alive on the latter day.

There is no definite evidence of any children from Nicholas’ first marriage. However, it is possible that one “Guy de Loveyne” who on 22 April 1365 was included in an indenture that entailed much of the de Pulteney estates and who does not appear to be recorded subsequently may have been a child of that marriage who presumably died young.

== Second Marriage and family ==
Nicholas married Margaret de Vere, the widow of Henry de Beaumont, 3rd Baron Beaumont, who had died on 25 July 1369. Margaret was a daughter of John de Vere, 7th Earl of Oxford and his wife Maud de Badlesmere. The marriage must have taken place without royal consent, as on 9 May 1375 a pardon was granted to the couple for Margaret having married without the King's licence.

Nicholas and Margaret's son Nicholas was described as aged “5 years and more” in 1375, but as late as 26 October 1369 Margaret had not yet remarried, indicating that the marriage of Nicholas and Margaret took place at the end of 1369 or early in 1370.

Nicholas and Margaret had two children:

- Nicholas de Loveyne (born c.1370)
- Margaret de Loveyne (c.1372-1408)

== Career ==
On 1 June 1349, Nicholas de Loveyne was described as a King's yeoman when he was granted custody of the lands of Margaret, daughter of William de Hardeshull along with control of her marriage.

It is likely, but not clear to what extent, that Nicholas was personally involved in the warfare between England and France which included the Battle of Poitiers in 1356 and the Reims campaign in 1359-60. He is recorded on 13 September 1360 as crossing the Channel with letters from the Black Prince to Edward III. On 8 June 1361, Edward III granted him an annuity of £50 “for long service”. Nicholas' role in the Black Prince's household was rewarded in 1361 by a payment of £26.13s.4d and also an income of 100 marks per year for life. In the following year, the Black Prince provided Nicholas with a further gift of £20.

An indication of the close connection between Nicholas and the Black Prince is that Sir Nicholas de Lovayne was one of five witnesses recorded by name who were present at the formal engagement of the Black Prince and Joan, Countess of Kent which took place at the chapel of Lambeth Palace on 6 October 1361, four days before the wedding itself.

Between July 1361 and August 1363, Sir Nicholas de Loveyne, “knight of the King’s chamber”, was serving as ambassador to the Holy See of the King, Queen and Prince of Wales. This was during that period when the popes resided at Avignon, those in office whilst Sir Nicholas was there being Innocent VI and Urban V. It appears from the surviving records that much of Nicholas’ work involved promoting the King's case for the appointment of particular individuals to ecclesiastical positions in cases where papal approval was required. It was as a result of Nicholas' representations that Urban V agreed in November 1363 to the presentment of William of Wykeham to the archdeaconry of Lincoln.

On 26 June 1364, Nicholas was appointed steward of the lordships of Ponthieu and Montreil, for which he was paid 200 marks a year.

On 19 July 1364, the King ratified an appointment for life that had been made by Queen Philippa of Nicholas de Lovaigne as constable and porter of Pevensey Castle.

On 17 November 1367, Nicholas was granted a licence to cross overseas from the port of Dover to the King's lordship of Ponthieu, where he was governor, with his own money and harness as well as ten horses and ten men.

The letters of protection and letters of attorney that survive from 1369 onwards indicate at least some of the points at which Nicholas went abroad in the latter part of his life. They were issued in connection with departures to France in February 1369 and October 1371, naval service in July and August 1372 and again to France in March and April 1375. On each occasion he was to serve as a man-at-arms.

== Property ==
Many of Nicholas’ property holdings are included in the list that follows. However, it may not be complete and not all of the properties were necessarily held at the same time. The manors of Aldebury, Coulyngle, Hedgecourt and Nutfield do not appear in any of the three immediately preceding sources but the references to them appear after the relevant entries below.

- In Cambridgeshire: The manors of Ditton Camoys at Woodditton, Swaffham Prior and Cheveley.
- In Essex: The advowson of Eselyng (the stated county may be a mistake for Eastling, Kent).
- In Hertfordshire: The manor of Shenley.
- In Kent: The manors of Penshurst, Yenesfield, Northpark and Ospringe and Southall in Woolwich. Property at Tonbridge, Leigh, Bidborough, Speldhurst and Chiddingstone.
- In Leicestershire: The manors of Misterton and Pulteney.
- In the City of London: The inn called Coldharbour, the Hay Wharf and other property in the parish of All-Hallows-the-Great. On 1 November 1353, the executors of Sir John Pulteney sold the interests they held in the property known as Coldharbour to Sir Nicholas Loveyne and Margaret his wife.
- In Middlesex: The manor of Poplar. Property at Stepney, East Ham, Stratford, Edmonton, Hackney, Bromley-by-Bow and Old Ford.
- In Northamptonshire: Property at Welford.
- In Oxfordshire: The manors of Barton St John and Stanton St John.
- In Suffolk: The manor of Withersfield with appurtenances at Horset and Haverhill.
- In Surrey: The manors of Aldebury in the parish of Merstham and Nutfield.
- In Sussex: The manor of Littleworth.
- In Surrey & Sussex: The manors of Hedgecourt and Coulyngle, extensive details of which appear on the website of Felbridge and District History Group.
- In Warwickshire: Property at Napton and Shotteswell.

Nicholas' property holdings were not confined to England. In November 1366, orders were given to the viscount of Pois, John de Boberche, the lord of Crezeques and Louc, and five others to complete the purchase of lands granted by Edward III to Sir Nicholas de Loveyne.

== Death ==
Sir Nicholas died on 24 September 1375. His will was made at Poplar four days earlier and directed that he be buried in the parish church of Penshurst or in the Abbey of St Mary of Graces. The will was proved on 25 November 1375. As Nicholas held the manor of Poplar and made his will there shortly before his death, it is likely that he died in Poplar manor house which at that time stood on land at the top of a lane from Poplar High Street on the present line of Wade's Place.

Evidently, he was buried at The Abbey of St. Mary de Graces, as a contract was entered into for Henry Lakenham, a London marbler, to construct his tomb there. This included a military effigy in freestone, resting on a table tomb comprising a marble plinth, a chest of marble ashlar with eight brass shields and a ledger slab with inscription. The monument was still in place in 1533 but presumably destroyed along with the abbey buildings after its dissolution in 1538.

A large-scale excavation of the site of the abbey took place in 1983-88. An analysis of the archaeological and documentary evidence uncovered has been published by the Museum of London.
