= Margaret de Vere =

English noblewoman

- Born: c. 1340; Earls Colne, Braintree District, Essex, England
- Died: 15 June 1398; Newgate, City of London, Greater London, England
- Buried: Greyfriars, London
- Noble family: House of De Vere
- Spouses: Henry de Beaumont, 3rd Baron Beaumont; Sir Nicholas de Loveyne; Sir John Devereux
- Issue: John Beaumont, 4th Baron Beaumont; Nicholas de Loveyne; Margaret de Loveyne; John Devereux; Joan Devereux
- Father: John de Vere, 7th Earl of Oxford
- Mother: Maud de Badlesmere

Margaret de Vere (died 15 June 1398) was an English noblewoman, a daughter of John de Vere, 7th Earl of Oxford and his wife Maud de Badlesmere.

== Background ==
Margaret was a daughter of John de Vere, 7th Earl of Oxford and his wife Maud de Badlesmere. Her date of birth is uncertain.

== First Marriage and family ==
Margaret's first marriage was to Henry de Beaumont, 3rd Baron Beaumont. They had one child:

- John Beaumont, 4th Baron Beaumont (1361-1396).

Henry died on 25 July 1369, leaving extensive property in Derbyshire, Leicestershire, Lincolnshire, Nottinghamshire and Warwickshire.

On 26 October 1369, the escheator of Lincolnshire was ordered to deliver to Margaret the manors of Heckington and Stewton along with two messuages at Lincoln, which the King had assigned to her as her dower. The King had taken Margaret's oath that she would not remarry without his licence. It appears that Margaret's claims to a share of Henry's assets were not fully resolved until much later, as on 14 October 1375 her attorneys were instructed in relation to her claims for dower.

== Second Marriage and family ==
Margaret's second husband was Sir Nicholas de Loveyne. As their son Nicholas was described as aged “5 years and more” in 1375, his parents had presumably married at the end of 1369 or early in 1370.

Margaret and Nicholas had two children:

- Nicholas de Loveyne (c. 1370)
- Margaret de Loveyne (c.1372-1408)

Sir Nicholas died on 24 September 1375.

== Third Marriage and family ==
Margaret's third marriage was to Sir John Devereux.

Their two children were:

- John Devereux
- Joan Devereux

Sir John Devereux died on 22 February 1392/3.

On 25 February 1393/4, the escheator of Buckinghamshire was instructed to assign dower to Margaret, as widow of Sir John.

== Death ==
Margaret died in 1398. Contemporary sources differ about the precise date. One of the writs that were issued on 20 June for an Inquisition Post Mortem stated that she had died on the Tuesday after the Nativity of John the Baptist (i.e. on 25 June 1398, which is later than the date of the writ itself). However, another two writs also dated 20 June give her date of death as Saturday after St Barnabas (i.e. 15 June 1398), which is clearly the more credible version.

Margaret was buried at Greyfriars, London, along with her third husband, in a raised tomb between the Common and Jesus altars.

On 12 October 1398, the escheators of Berkshire, Buckinghamshire, Dorset, Essex, Norfolk and Suffolk were ordered to take into custody on behalf of the King land that Margaret had held at the time of her death.

== Ancestry ==
Ancestors of Margaret de Vere

Hugh de Vere, 4th Earl of Oxford
Robert de Vere, 5th Earl of Oxford
Hawise de Quincy
Alphonse de Vere
Gilbert de Sanford
Alice de Sanford
John de Vere, 7th Earl of Oxford
Richard Foliot or Jordan Foliot
Joan Foliot b. 1282
‘’’Margaret de Vere’’’
Bartholomew de Badlesmere
Gunselm de Badlesmere
Bartholomew de Badlesmere, 1st Baron Badlesmere
Joan FitzBernard
Maud de Badlesmere, Countess of Oxford
Richard de Clare, 6th Earl of Gloucester
Thomas de Clare, Lord of Thomond
Maud de Lacy
Margaret de Clare
Maurice FitzGerald, 3rd Lord of Offaly
Juliana FitzGerald
Maud de Prendergast
