= Maud de Ufford =

English noblewoman

- Countess of Oxford
- Born: 1345/1346; Ireland
- Died: 25 January 1413; Great Bentley, Essex, England
- Buried: Bruisyard Abbey, Suffolk
- Spouse: Thomas de Vere, 8th Earl of Oxford
- Issue: Robert de Vere, 9th Earl of Oxford
- Father: Sir Ralph de Ufford, Justiciar of Ireland
- Mother: Maud of Lancaster

Maud de Ufford, Countess of Oxford (1345/1346 – 25 January 1413) was a wealthy English noblewoman and the wife of Thomas de Vere, 8th Earl of Oxford. Her only child was Robert de Vere, 9th Earl of Oxford, the favourite of King Richard II. In 1404 in Essex, she took part in a conspiracy against King Henry IV and was sent to the Tower of London; however, she was eventually pardoned through the efforts of Queen Joanna.

She resided in the village of Great Bentley in Essex.

== Family ==
Maud was born in Ireland sometime in about 1345 or 1346. Her parents were Sir Ralph de Ufford, Justiciar of Ireland and Maud of Lancaster, widow of William Donn de Burgh, 3rd Earl of Ulster. Maud was their only child and heiress, although she had a uterine half-sister, Elizabeth de Burgh, who was the suo jure Countess of Ulster.

On 9 April 1346, Maud's father died in Kilmainham. Sir Ralph had been an incompetent Justiciar, and was disliked by the Irish. Maud, who was a baby, and her mother fled to England. Sometime between 8 August 1347 and 25 April 1348, Maud's mother became a canoness at the Augustinian Priory of Campsey in Suffolk.

== Marriage ==
Sometime before 10 June 1350, when she was still a child of around 5 years old, she married Thomas de Vere, son and heir of John de Vere, 7th Earl of Oxford and Maud de Badlesmere. He would succeed to the title of 8th Earl in 1360; henceforth, Maud was styled as the Countess of Oxford. The marriage produced one son:

- Robert de Vere, 9th Earl of Oxford, Marquess of Dublin, Duke of Ireland (16 January 1362- 1392), born when Maud was about 16 years old. He married firstly, Philippa de Coucy, and secondly Agnes de Launcekrona.

Maud's husband died in September 1371. Maud was provided-for in terms of dower, enfeoffments and jointure; from 1371, she held nearly half the de Vere ancestral estates and she received an annual income of £662. Her principal residence was Great Bentley in Essex. She was described as a profligate landowner, and later engaged in litigations with her brother-in-law, Aubrey de Vere, 10th Earl of Oxford over de Vere property.

In 1387, when her son Robert repudiated his first wife, Philippa for Agnes de Launcekrona, a Czech lady-in-waiting of Queen consort Anne of Bohemia, Maud took Philippa's side against her son. She admitted to holding Philippa "more dear than as if she had been her own daughter", and did not hesitate to curse Robert for his actions. Philippa was afterwards taken into Maud's household and was paid £100 for her costs in supporting Philippa in May 1388 by the king.

Despite her anger at her son's treatment of his wife, Maud nevertheless visited him in Brabant following his forced exile by the Lords Appellant and Parliament in 1388, where she brought him gifts. She received a pardon on 10 May 1391 for "having crossed the sea without licence to Brabant to confer with her son Robert de Vere, late earl of Oxford, and for relieving him with certain gifts". Maud remained in high favour with King Richard after her son's exile, having received on 16 November 1389 a grant of the farm of all the lands "lately her husband's" for twenty years. This was cancelled upon her son's death in 1392, when his uncle Aubrey succeeded as Earl of Oxford.

== Conspiracy ==
In 1404, Maud involved herself in a conspiracy along with the abbots of Beeleigh, Colchester, and St. Osyth to depose King Henry IV by way of a French invasion, and replace him with King Richard who was allegedly still alive. It was also alleged that she had caused the white harts of Richard II's livery to be fashioned. She was arrested and sent to the Tower of London in May 1404; however, due to the intervention of Queen Joanna, she was eventually pardoned by King Henry on 16 November 1404.

Maud died on 25 January 1413 at her residence in Great Bentley, Essex and was buried at Bruisyard Abbey in Suffolk, near her mother the founder, and her half-sister Elizabeth de Burgh - instead of the monastery of Earl's Colne of which she had been the patron, and where her husband and son were buried. An executor of her will is named as Robert Boleyne.
