= John Beaumont, 4th Baron Beaumont =

English military commander and Admiral

- Garter stall plate of John Beaumont, 4th Baron Beaumont. Beaumont quartering Comyn
- Born: c. 1361; Folkingham Castle, Lincolnshire
- Died: 9 September 1396; Stirling, Scotland
- Buried: Sempringham Priory, Lincolnshire
- Offices: Warden of the West Marches; Admiral of the Northern Fleet; Constable of Dover Castle; Warden of the Cinque Ports; Ambassador to France
- Noble family: House of Beaumont
- Spouses: Katherine Everingham, dau. of Sir Thomas Everingham, Knt. of Laxton, Nottinghamshire
- Issue: Henry Beaumont, 5th Baron Beaumont; Richard Beaumont; Sir Thomas Beaumont; Eleanora Beaumont; Elizabeth Beaumont, married William Botreaux, 3rd Baron Botreaux
- Father: Henry Beaumont, 3rd Baron Beaumont
- Mother: Margaret de Vere, dau. of John de Vere, 7th Earl of Oxford

Arms of Beaumont: Azure semée of fleurs-de-lis, a lion rampant or

John Beaumont, 4th Baron Beaumont (1361–1396) was an English military commander and Admiral who served in the Hundred Years' War against the partisans of Antipope Clement VII.

== Origins ==
John Beaumont was born in 1361 at Folkingham Castle, Lincolnshire, the only son of Henry Beaumont, 3rd Baron Beaumont (1340–1369), by his wife Margaret, daughter of John de Vere, 7th Earl of Oxford, by his wife Maud de Badlesmere. His paternal grandparents were John Beaumont, 2nd Baron Beaumont (aft. 1317–1342) and Eleanor of Lancaster (1318–1372), the fifth daughter of Henry, 3rd Earl of Lancaster (c. 1281–1345).

== Career ==
He was knighted by King Edward III. He served in the French wars and against the partisans of Pope Clement VII. He accompanied John of Gaunt to Spain in the attempted conquest of Castile in 1386. He tilted against the Great Chamberlain of France in a tournament at Calais in 1388. In 1390 he tilted with the famous Boucicaut at St. Inghelbert. He was appointed Admiral of the North from 20 May 1388 – 22 June 1389 jointly with Sir John Roches. From 23 June 1389 until 22 March 1390, Admiral Lord Beaumont held the office solely. In 1389 he was briefly Warden of the West Marches towards Scotland. In 1392 he was appointed Constable of Dover Castle and Lord Warden of the Cinque Ports. In 1393 he was created a Knight of the Garter and was one of the Ambassadors to France to demand Princess Isabella in marriage for King Richard II.

== Marriage ==
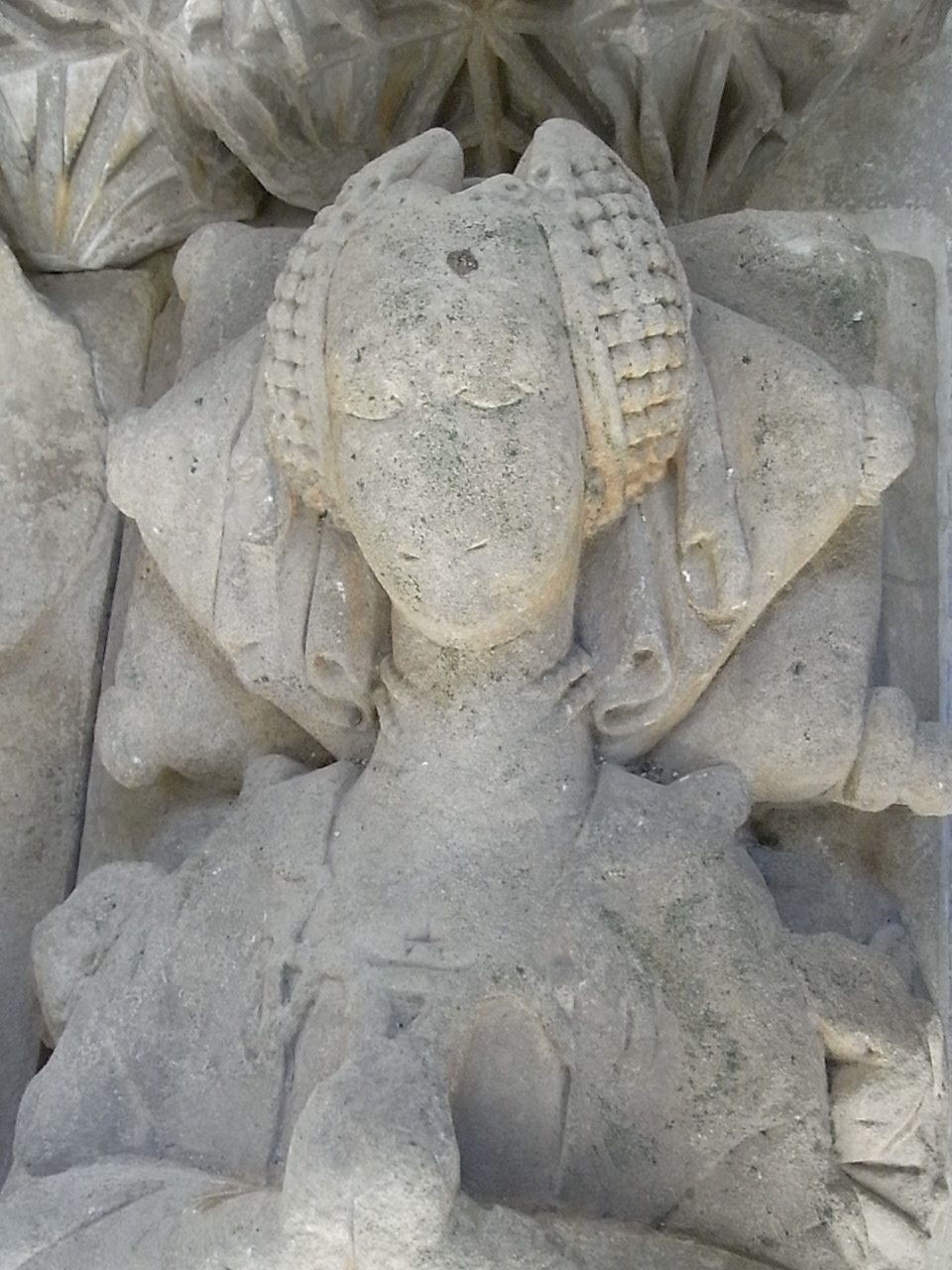
Effigy presumed that of Elizabeth Beaumont, daughter of John Beaumont, 4th Baron Beaumont. She became the 1st wife of William de Botreaux, 3rd Baron Botreaux. North Cadbury Church, Somerset

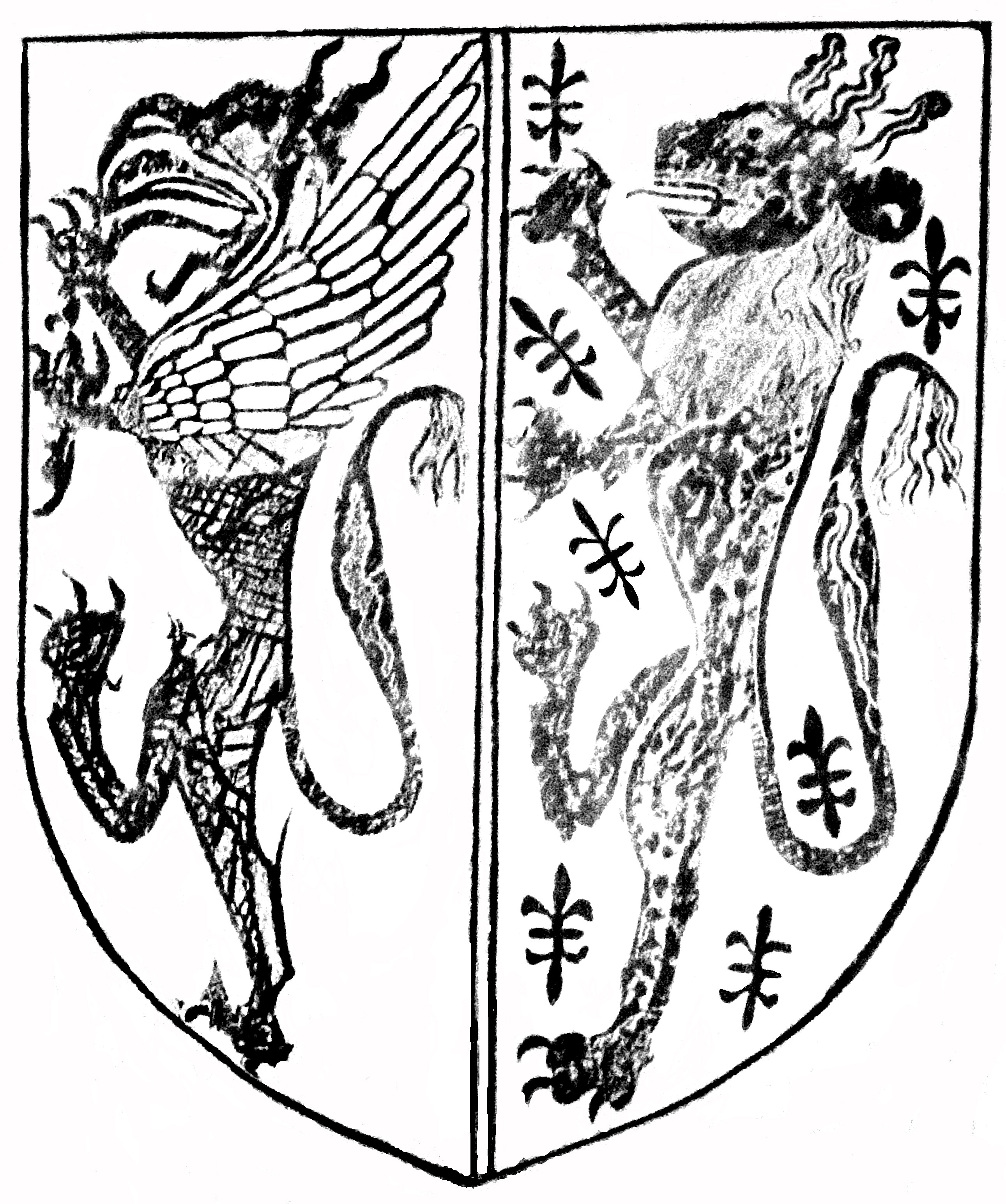
Heraldic escutcheon incised on tombstone of Reginald de Botreaux (d.1420), died young, whose mother was Elizabeth Beaumont, daughter of John Beaumont, 4th Baron Beaumont. Aller Church, Somerset. It shows the impaled arms of his parents: Baron: Argent, a griffin segreant gules armed azure (Botreaux); Femme: Azure seme of fleurs-de-lis a lion rampant or (Beaumont)

In 1389 he married Katherine Everingham (1367–1426/8), daughter and heiress of Sir Thomas Everingham, Knt. of Laxton, Nottinghamshire. They had the five children:

- Henry Beaumont, 5th Baron Beaumont (d.1413), eldest son and heir, who married Elizabeth Willoughby, daughter of William Willoughby, 5th Baron Willoughby de Eresby (c.1370–1409), by whom he had issue John Beaumont, 1st Viscount Beaumont KG, the first Viscount to be created in England. His daughter Elizabeth married Thomas Neville of Brancepeth, son of John Neville (died 1420)
- Richard Beaumont, 2nd son.
- Sir Thomas Beaumont, Lord of Bacqueville in France, 3rd son, who married Philippa Marward, daughter of Thomas Marward of Quartermarshe, Leicestershire. From this union descended the Beaumonts of Gracedieu in Leicestershire, the Beaumonts of Gittisham, near Honiton in Devon (inherited "for the sake of the name" from the also ancient but unrelated family of Beaumont of Shirwell in North Devon) and the Beaumonts of Coleorton in Leicestershire, which latter were the ancestors of the Beaumont baronets. His great grandson was John Beaumont
- Eleanora Beaumont, a nun at Amesbury Abbey.
- Elizabeth (or Cecilia) Beaumont, married, as his first wife, William de Botreaux, 3rd Baron Botreaux(1389–1462), whose sole heiress was his daughter Margaret Botreaux who married Robert Hungerford, 2nd Baron Hungerford.

Political offices
Preceded by The Lord Devereux	Lord Warden of the Cinque Ports; 1392–1396	Succeeded by The Duke of York
Peerage of England
Preceded by Henry Beaumont	Baron Beaumont; 1369–1396	Succeeded by Henry Beaumont
