= Joseph Skelton =

Joseph Skelton may refer to:

- Joseph John Skelton, English engraver
- Joseph Ratcliffe Skelton, English illustrator
