= John de Pulteney =

14th-century English merchant and Mayor of London

Sir John de Pulteney
- Died: 8 June 1349
- Spouse: Margaret de Bereford
- Issue: William de Pulteney
- Father: Adam de Pulteney
- Mother: Matilda

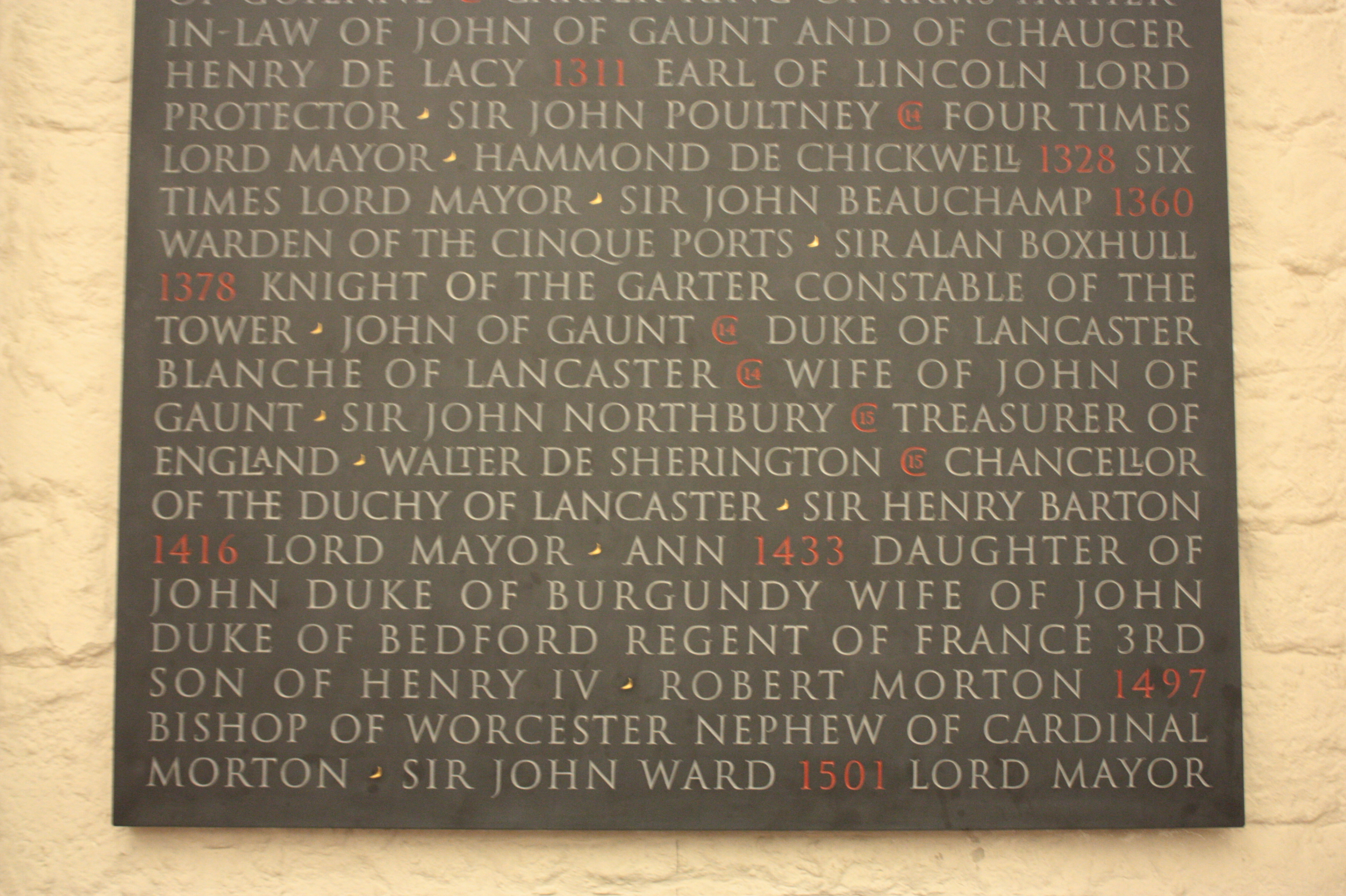
Poultney's name listed on the Memorial to graves destroyed in Old St Paul's Cathedral

Sir John de Pulteney (sometimes spelled Poultney; died 8 June 1349) was a major English entrepreneur and property owner, who served four times as Lord Mayor of London.

== Background ==
A biography of Sir John, written by Charles Lethbridge Kingsford, that was published in the Dictionary of National Biography, 1885–1900, Volume 47 contains much well-referenced information. However, it is inaccurate in stating the Sir John's wife was a daughter of John de St John of Lageham, for reasons that are set out in detail in two articles by Walter Lee Sheppard Jr.

Sir John's parents are identified in his will as Adam and Matilda.

== Marriage and family ==
Sir John de Pulteney married Margaret, daughter of John de Bereford, citizen of London and his wife Roesia. The marriage evidently took place by 13 December 1330, when they arranged for perpetual masses for themselves and “for the souls of John de Bureford late citizen of London and Roesia his wife” to take place at St Nicholas Shambles, London, since demolished. His association with the de Bereford family went back significantly before 1330, as in July 1318 he was recorded as executor of the will of Roesia de Bureford, late the executrix of John de Bureford, citizen of London.

The couple had one known child, William de Pulteney (1340-1366/67).

Shortly after Sir John de Pulteney's death, his widow married Sir Nicholas de Loveyne.

He was buried in Old St Paul's Cathedral, but the grave and monument were destroyed along with the cathedral in the Great Fire of London in 1666. A modern monument in the crypt lists his among the important graves lost, shown above right.

== Career ==
Sir John was a citizen of London and a member of the Drapers’ Company.

His business activities included the lending of money. For instance, in July 1325, Robert Burdet of Sheepy, Leicestershire acknowledged that he owed £100 to John de Pulteney. In the following month, the Prior of the Hospital of St John of Jerusalem in England acknowledged that he owed John the sum of £800. John also lent money to the King, such as an unstated sum that in June 1329 was outstanding but secured on the customs revenue of Southampton.

He served as Lord Mayor of London in 1331, 1332, 1334 and 1336 and also held the office of Escheator of the City of London. Other roles that he undertook included membership of commissions of oyer and terminer in a number of counties, guardian of the peace for Middlesex and roles in negotiations with Flanders.

== Building projects ==
Sir John invested some of his considerable wealth in notable building projects, including those listed below. He appears to have been particularly active on these matters around 1341; on 6 October of that year, he was granted a licence to crenelate the dwelling places of his manors at Cheveley, Cambridgeshire and Penshurst Kent, as well as his dwelling place in London.

- ‘’’Penshurst Place’’’ was built about 1341. This Grade I listed building includes later additions, but the large hall with its fine timber roof supported by figure corbels and its undercroft date back to Sir John's era.
- ‘’’Coldharbour House, Candlewick Street, City of London’’ - Sir John constructed this mansion, which has also been referred to as Pulteney House or Pulteney’s Inn. It overlooked the River Thames and was occupied by the Black Prince after Sir John’s death until 1359 when it was transferred to Sir Nicholas de Loveyne.
- ‘’’College of St Laurence Pountney, London’’’ – He added to St Laurence church, Candlewick Street a chapel that was dedicated to Corpus Christi and St John the Baptist. This chantry chapel appears to have been established by 1332.
- ‘’’Carmelites or White Friars church, Coventry’’’ – Sir John paid for the construction of this monastery, which took place about 1342.
- ‘’’Cheveley Castle, Cambridgeshire’’’ – Little remains of this building, so it does not seem possible to say whether Sir John carried out the works that were permitted in 1341.

== Death and Property ==
Sir John died on 8 June 1349, a date that suggests he may have been a victim of the Black Death, although no documentary evidence appears to support that possibility.

At the end of his life, he owned or had interests in the following properties that were identified at the subsequent inquisitions post mortem:

- In Cambridgeshire: The manors of Ditton Camoys at Woodditton, Cheveley and Swaffham Prior.
- In Hertfordshire: The manor of Shenley.
- In Kent: The manors of Ospringe, Penshurst, Yenesfield, Plumstead and Southalle.
- In Leicestershire: The manors of Pulteney and Misterton. Land at Dadlington.
- In The City of London: Various rents and burgages.
- In Middlesex: The manor of “Poplar in Stebbenheth” (i.e. Poplar in Stepney). Two mills and rent at East Smithfield.
- In Suffolk: The manor of Withersfield.
- In Warwickshire: Property at Napton and Shotteswell.

== Will ==
His will was made on 14 November 1348 and proved at the Court of Hustings, London. It contained bequests to support chantries in St Paul's Cathedral and prayers for his soul and for the souls of family members and others. These were to be funded from all his tenements and rents in the city and suburbs of London, apart from his principal house where he lived in the parish of St Laurence, Candlewick Street and his tenement called “le Coldherberuy” and his other tenements in the parish of All-Hallows-the-Great.

He left his principal mansion to his wife for life or (as actually transpired) until her remarriage, after which it would go to Sir William de Clinton, Earl of Huntingdon during the minority of Sir John's son, after which it would go to the son. The tenement called “le Coldherberuy” was to be sold. Ralph de Stratford, Bishop of London and Sir William de Clinton were named as supervisors of the will.

Examples of Sir John's affluence are found in specific bequests to the respective supervisors, which were his “finest ring with a great stone called rubie of great value and beauty” and “a beautiful ring with two great stones called diamauntes, two silver flagons enamelled, a cup, together with a certain spoon and salt-cellar to match”.

== Bibliography ==
- Norman, Philip (1901). "Sir John de Pulteney and his two residences in London, Cold Harbour and the manor of the rose, together with a few remarks on the parish of St. Lawrence Poultney". Archaeologia. 57 part 2 (2): 257–84. doi:10.1017/s0261340900014132.
