= Maud de Badlesmere =

English noblewoman

- Countess of Oxford
- Born: 1310; Castle Badlesmere, Kent, England
- Died: May 1366 (aged 55–56); Hall Place, Earl's Colne, Essex, England
- Buried: Colne Priory
- Noble family: Badlesmere
- Spouses: Robert FitzPayn; John de Vere, 7th Earl of Oxford
- Issue: John de Vere; Thomas de Vere, 8th Earl of Oxford; Aubrey de Vere, 10th Earl of Oxford; Robert de Vere; Elizabeth de Vere; Margaret de Vere; Maud de Vere
- Father: Bartholomew de Badlesmere, 1st Baron Badlesmere
- Mother: Margaret de Clare

Maud de Badlesmere, Countess of Oxford (1310 – May 1366) was an English noblewoman, and the wife of John de Vere, 7th Earl of Oxford. She, along with her three sisters, was a co-heiress of her only brother Giles de Badlesmere, 2nd Baron Badlesmere, who had no male issue.

At the age of 11 she was imprisoned in the Tower of London along with her mother, Margaret de Clare, Baroness Badlesmere and her four siblings, after the former refused Queen consort Isabella admittance to Leeds Castle and ordered an assault upon her when she attempted entry.

== Family ==
Maud was born at Castle Badlesmere, Kent, England in 1310, the second eldest daughter of Bartholomew de Badlesmere, 1st Baron Badlesmere and Margaret de Clare. She had three sisters, Margery, Elizabeth, and Margaret; all of whom eventually married and had issue. She had one brother, Giles.

Her paternal grandparents were Guncelin de Badlesmere and Joan FitzBernard, and her maternal grandparents were Thomas de Clare, Lord of Thomond and Juliana FitzGerald of Offaly.

On 14 April 1322, when she was twelve years of age, Maud's father was hanged, drawn and quartered by orders of King Edward II, following his participation in the Earl of Lancaster's rebellion and his subsequent capture after the Battle of Boroughbridge. Maud, her siblings, and her mother had been arrested the previous October after the latter had ordered an assault upon Queen consort Isabella after refusing her admittance to Leeds Castle where Baron Badlesmere held the post of governor. Maud's mother, Baroness Badlesmere, remained imprisoned in the Tower of London until 3 November 1322, although it is not known when Maud and her siblings were released. Her brother Giles obtained a reversal of their father's attainder in 1328, and he succeeded to the barony as 2nd Baron Badlesmere. Maud, along with her three sisters, was Giles's co-heiress, as he had married but fathered no children by his wife, Elizabeth Montagu.

== Marriages and issue ==
In June 1316, Maud, aged six, married her first husband, Robert FitzPayn, son of Robert FitzPayn. Welsh historian R. R. Davies relates in his book, Lords and lordship in the British Isles in the late Middle Ages how her father, Lord Badlesmere, when drawing up the marriage contract, sought to provide for Maud's future by ensuring that she would have independent means. He granted her land worth 200 marks per year, and her future father-in-law was constrained to endow her with three manors and their revenues. The marriage did not produce children; and on an unknown date sometime before March 1335 Maud married secondly, John de Vere, 7th Earl of Oxford. Upon her marriage, Maud assumed the title Countess of Oxford. John was a captain in King Edward III's army, and as such participated in the Battle of Crécy and the Battle of Poitiers.

The marriage produced seven children:

- John de Vere (December 1335- before 23 June 1350), married Elizabeth de Courtney as her first husband.
- Thomas de Vere, 8th Earl of Oxford (1336- 18 September 1371), married Maud de Ufford, by whom he had a son Robert de Vere, 9th Earl of Oxford
- Aubrey de Vere, 10th Earl of Oxford (1338- 15 February 1400), married Alice FitzWalter, by whom he had three children, including Richard de Vere, 11th Earl of Oxford
- Robert de Vere (died 1360)
- Elizabeth de Vere (died 23 September 1375), married firstly in 1341, Sir Hugh de Courtney, by whom she had one son, Hugh de Courtney, Lord Courtney; she married secondly John de Mowbray, 3rd Lord Mowbray; she married thirdly on 18 January 1369 Sir William Costyn
- Margaret de Vere (died 15 June 1398), married firstly Henry de Beaumont, 3rd Baron Beaumont (4 April 1340 – 17 June 1369), the son of John de Beaumont, 2nd Baron Beaumont and Eleanor of Lancaster, by whom she had issue; she married secondly Sir Nicholas de Loveyne; she married thirdly after 1375 Sir John Devereux, by whom she had issue.
- Maud de Vere

In June 1338, Maud's brother Giles died without leaving any legitimate issue. A considerable portion of the Badlesmere estates was inherited by Maud and her husband.

Maud died at the de Vere family mansion Hall Place in Earls Colne, Essex in May 1366 at the age of fifty-six years. Evidence given at the various inquisitions post mortem held after her death differ as to whether she died on the 19th, 23rd or 24th day of the month. This source gives details of her numerous properties which were to be found in Essex and six other counties.

Maud was buried in Colne Priory. Her husband had died in 1360.

== Ancestry ==
Ancestors of Maud de Badlesmere

Bartholomew de Badlesmere
Gunselm de Badlesmere
Bartholomew de Badlesmere, 1st Baron Badlesmere
Maud de Badlesmere
Richard de Clare, 6th Earl of Hertford
Thomas de Clare, Lord of Thomond
Maud de Lacy
Margaret de Clare
Maurice FitzGerald, 3rd Lord of Offaly
Juliana FitzGerald
Maud de Prendergast
