= Agnes de Launcekrona =

English noblewoman of the fourteenth century

- Born: Unknown; Bohemia
- Died: Unknown
- Noble family: De Vere (by marriage)
- Spouse: Robert de Vere, 9th Earl of Oxford, Duke of Ireland (m. 1387; died 1392)
- Occupation: Lady of the Bedchamber to Anne of Bohemia

Agnes de Launcekrona was Lady of the Bedchamber to Queen consort Anne of Bohemia (1366 – 1394). She became the second wife of Robert de Vere, 9th Earl of Oxford, a favourite of King Richard II of England.

== Origins ==
Nothing is known about the origins of Agnes. According to Costain, she was described as a countess (from a German or Netherlandish family) and also as the daughter of a Flemish saddler. While her rank and nationality are unknown, what proved significant was that in English society she was not considered a suitable spouse for an earl.

== Marriage to the Earl of Oxford ==
Agnes accompanied Anne of Bohemia, the future consort of King Richard II, to England in December 1381. She served in the capacity of Lady of the Bedchamber, and was also the custodian of the jewels and valuables given to Queen Anne by her mother, Elizabeth of Pomerania. Anne was duly married to King Richard and crowned Queen consort on 22 January 1382. On an unknown date, Agnes caught the eye of the King's favourite, Robert de Vere, 9th Earl of Oxford, Marquess of Dublin, Duke of Ireland. She has been described as "dark and lively, with a foreign kind of prettiness". She became de Vere's mistress, and then in 1387, he repudiated and subsequently divorced his wife, Philippa de Coucy and promptly married Agnes. This created a scandal throughout the kingdom, especially as Philippa was the first cousin of the King, being the youngest daughter of his aunt, Isabella of England. Her royal uncles, the Dukes of Lancaster, Gloucester, and York were especially angered. Even his own mother, Maud de Ufford took Philippa's side against her son, saying that she held Philippa "more dear than if she had been her own daughter", and cursed Robert for his actions. She took Philippa into her own household, while Robert brought Agnes to live with him in Chester.

As for Queen Anne's reaction to the scandalous conduct of her Lady of the Bedchamber, there are two versions. The first is that the Queen disapproved of de Vere's repudiation of his highborn wife to marry her Lady of the Bedchamber. The second version is that Queen Anne, through genuine fondness for Agnes, wrote to the Pope, urging him to grant the divorce. The latter story was circulated throughout England, with the result that Anne lost some of the popularity she had previously enjoyed. The divorce was granted to de Vere upon false evidence which he had submitted to the Pope. It was his love for Agnes that had kept de Vere from taking up his duties in Ireland where there was rebellion, which he had been given regal powers to quell.

By this time, de Vere had made many enemies amongst the nobles who resented the high favour in which de Vere was held by the King. In point of fact, it was his close relationship to King Richard which was the catalyst for the formation of the Lords Appellant which was an organised group of noblemen who seized political control of the kingdom from King Richard. In the same year of his marriage to Agnes, de Vere led royal forces against the Lords Appellant but the former were defeated at Radcot Bridge on 20 December 1387, and de Vere, after escaping by leaping into the river on horseback and galloping away on the other side, made his way to London. He was forced into exile by Parliament in 1388 and went to live in Louvain, Brabant. Robert de Vere was subsequently declared a traitor, and his honours and properties were forfeited.

Agnes never held the titles of Countess of Oxford or Duchess of Ireland, as Philippa continued to use those titles after the divorce. Pope Urban VI declared de Vere's divorce to Philippa invalid on 17 October 1389. It is likely that Agnes returned to Bohemia instead of having accompanied her husband into exile in Brabant.

In 1392, Robert de Vere died of the injuries he had sustained during a boar hunt. He was succeeded as Earl of Oxford by his uncle, Aubrey de Vere, as neither of his two marriages had produced children.
