= Philippa de Coucy =

English noblewoman (1367–1411)

- Countess of Oxford & Duchess of Ireland
- Born: bef. 18 April 1367; Eltham Palace
- Died: 24 September 1411: (aged about 44)
- Noble family: Coucy
- Spouse: Robert de Vere, 9th Earl of Oxford, Duke of Ireland (m. 1376; div. 1387)
- Father: Enguerrand VII, Lord of Coucy
- Mother: Isabella of England

Philippa de Coucy, Countess of Oxford, Duchess of Ireland (before 18 April 1367 – 24 September 1411) was a first cousin of King Richard II of England and the wife of his favourite, Robert de Vere, 9th Earl of Oxford, Marquess of Dublin, Duke of Ireland. Philippa was made a Lady of the Garter in 1378.

== Early life ==
Philippa was born at Eltham Palace shortly before 18 April 1367, the younger daughter of Enguerrand VII, Lord of Coucy, by his wife Isabella, eldest daughter of King Edward III of England. She was named after her grandmother, Philippa of Hainault. In 1371, at the age of four, she was betrothed to Robert de Vere, who was himself only five years older and was already Earl of Oxford.

== Marriage ==
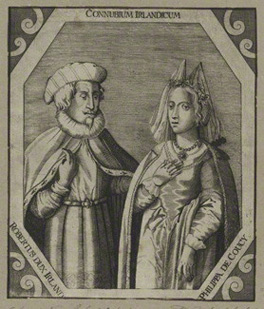
17th-century imaginary portrait of de Vere and de Coucy.

The betrothed couple were married on 5 October 1376; they had no children. Like her mother, Isabella, Philippa was created a Lady of the Garter. Her husband quickly became a favourite of the young King Richard, and some suspected a homosexual relationship.

== Repudiation and divorce ==
In 1387, de Vere repudiated Philippa and Pope Urban VI granted him a divorce. De Vere had begun an affair with Agnes de Launcekrona, a lady-in-waiting of Richard II's queen, Anne of Bohemia, and he took Agnes as his second wife. This created a scandal throughout the kingdom; Philippa's royal uncles, John of Gaunt, Thomas of Woodstock, 1st Duke of Gloucester, and Edmund of Langley, 1st Duke of York, were especially angered. De Vere's mother, Maud de Ufford, sided with Philippa and took her into her own household, saying that she held Philippa "more dear than if she had been her own daughter".

Philippa continued to be styled as the Countess of Oxford and Duchess of Ireland. Shortly afterwards, in 1388, de Vere was disgraced and sent into exile in Louvain, Brabant. On 17 October 1389, the Pope declared the divorce invalid. De Vere was killed while out hunting in 1392. Philippa became an attendant of Richard II's second wife, Isabella of Valois, whom she accompanied on her return to France after Richard's death in 1400. Philippa died in England, on 24 September 1411, aged around 44.
