= All-Hallows-the-Less =

Coordinates: 51.5099°N 0.0893°W

All-Hallows-the-Less and Great
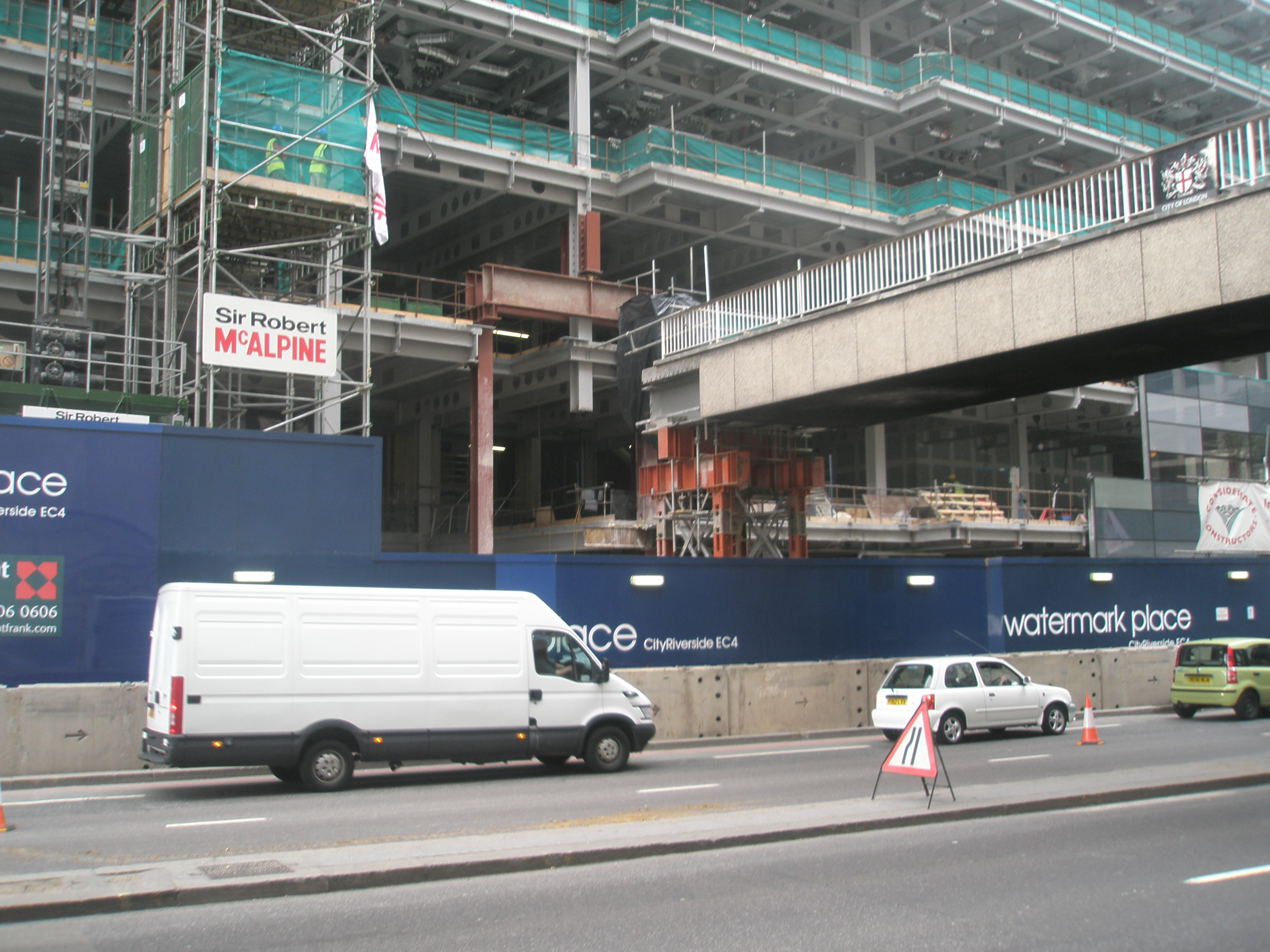
- The site in 2008; Parish Boundary
- All-Hallows-the-Less and Great
- Location: Thames Street, London
- Country: England
- Denomination: Anglican

All-Hallows-the-Less (also known as All-Hallows-upon-the-Cellar) was a church in the City of London. Of medieval origin, it was destroyed in the Great Fire of London in 1666 and not rebuilt.

== History ==
The church stood on the south side of Thames Street in Dowgate ward, to the east of the All Hallows the Great. In some early records it is called "Allhallows on the Cellars", as it stood on vaults. The steeple and choir were built over an arched gateway, which formed the entrance to a house called Cold Harbour. The area was known as The Ropery.

The first mention of the church is from 1216, and in 1387 two adjacent houses were given to expand the church. The choir, having fallen down, was rebuilt in 1594 at the cost of the parishioners. The church was renovated again in 1616; at this time dormer windows were installed on the south side, "the interior, being very dark and gloomy". Three galleries were added in 1633.

== Destruction ==
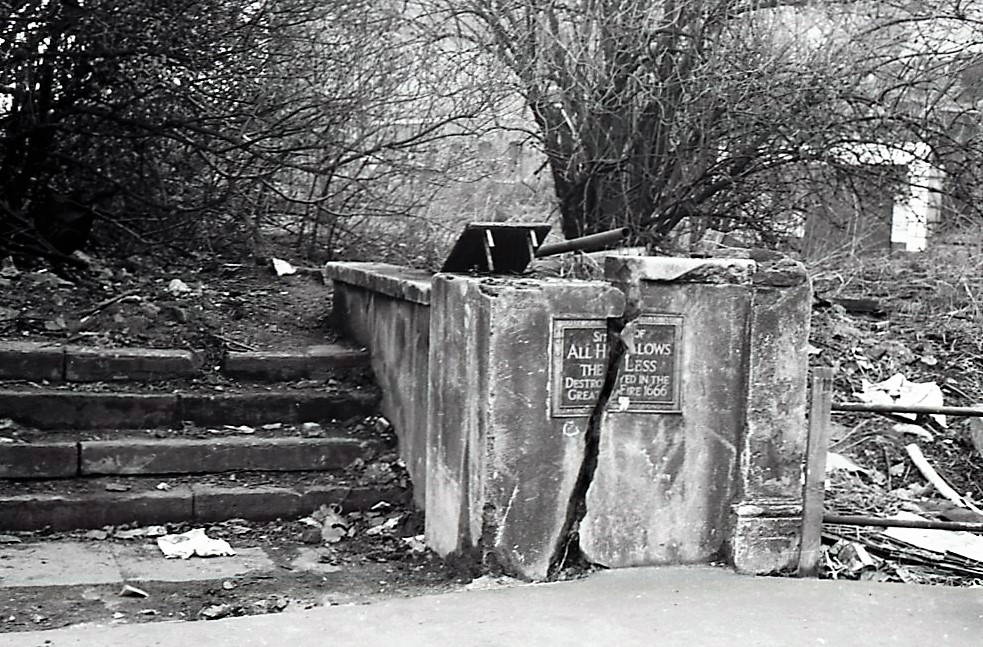
Photograph taken in the mid 60s of the remaining steps and commemorative plaque to All-Hallows-the-Less church.

The church was destroyed, along with most of the churches in the City, by the Great Fire of 1666. In 1670 Parliament passed a Rebuilding Act and a committee was set up under the stewardship of Sir Christopher Wren to decide which churches would be rebuilt. All-Hallows-the-Less was not amongst those chosen; instead the parish was united with that of All-Hallows-the-Great, and the site of the church retained as a burial ground.

All-Hallows-the-Great itself was demolished in 1894 and the united parishes were in turn joined with that of St Michael Paternoster Royal under the Union of Benefices Act 1860. In 1896 many bodies were disinterred from the churchyard and reburied at Brookwood Cemetery. The last physical evidence of the existence of All-Hallows-the-Less, an old watch house, was destroyed during the Second World War.

The church is the setting for the London Institute in Cassandra Clare's young adult book series, The Infernal Devices.
