= St Laurence Pountney =

Coordinates: 51.5106°N 0.0885°W

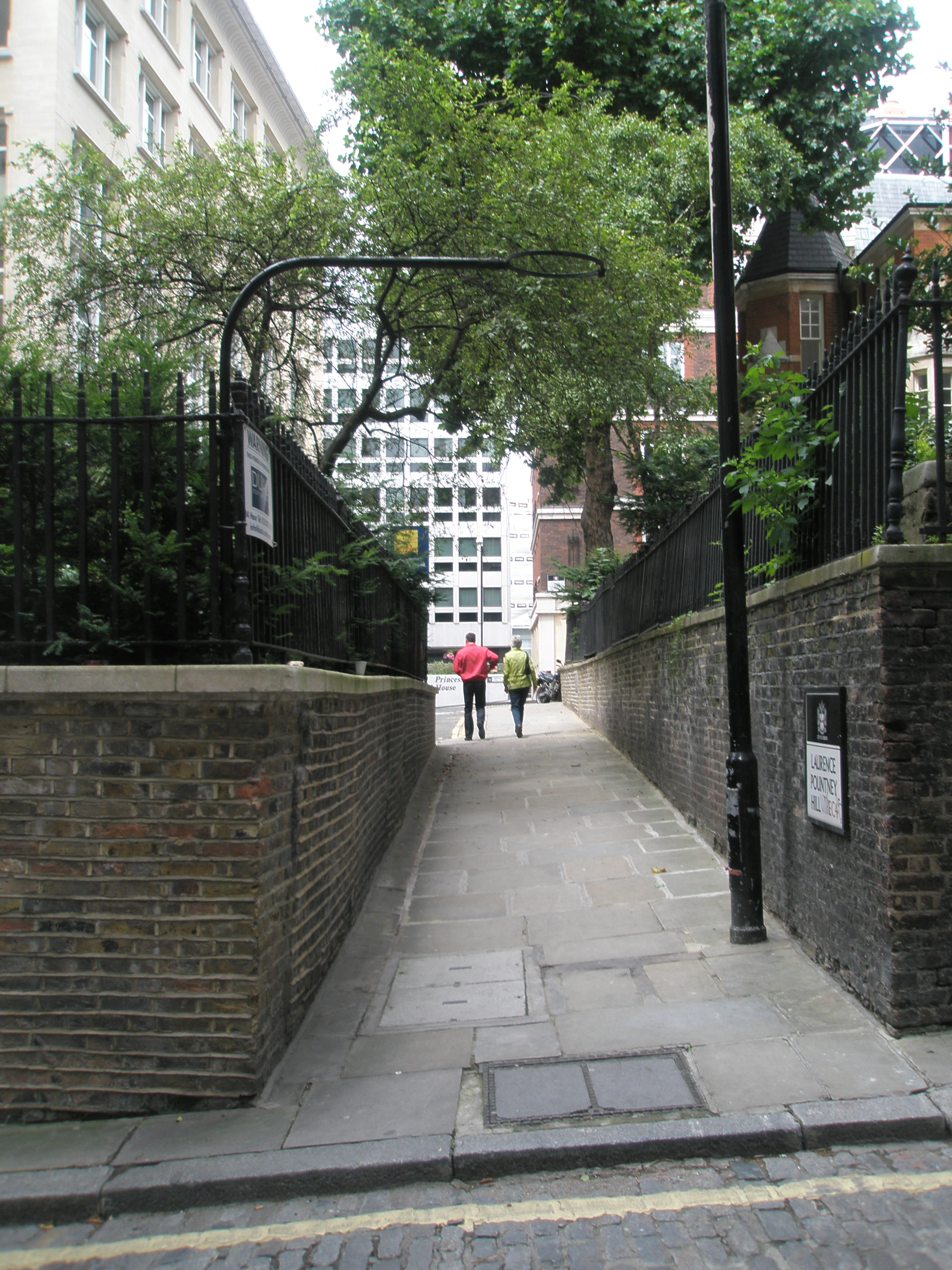
- Current photo of site
- St Laurence Pountney
- Location: Laurence Pountney Hill London
- Country: England
- Denomination: Anglican

History
- Founded: 13th century

Architecture
- Demolished: 1666

St Laurence Pountney was a Church of England parish church in the Candlewick ward of the City of London. It was destroyed in the Great Fire of 1666, and not rebuilt.

== History ==
The church stood on the west side of what is now Laurence Pountney Lane, between Cannon Street and Upper Thames Street in the Candlewick ward of the city.

The earliest known mention of the church comes in a charter, ostensibly written in the reign of William I, but in fact a mid-12th century forgery. It records the king's confirmation of a previous grant of St Laurence's to Westminster Abbey. During the late 13th and early 14th centuries the church was recorded under various names including "St Laurence next the Thames" , "St Laurence in Candlewigstrate" and "Sancti Laurenc’ de Lundenestane". The later name "Pountney" comes from the mayor Sir John de Pultneye, who founded and endowed the Chapel of Corpus Christi and St John the Baptist adjoining the north side of the church as a college for a master and seven chaplains. The college is known to have been in existence by 1332. Part of its endowment consisted of the patronage of the church itself, which Pultneye had obtained from Westminster Abbey. It was suppressed during the reign of Edward VI.

The church had a tower with a tall wooden spire, covered in lead. A programme of improvements was undertaken at the cost of the parish in 1631–2, in the course of which the spire was releaded, a set of five new bells was hung in a new frame, and the floors were raised and levelled. There was a churchyard to the south, with a substantial retaining wall.

In the Late Middle Ages, Candlewick street was a concentration of foreign weavers of woolen cloth from the Low Countries, invited by King Edward III in the 1330s to establish their craft in London, and had grown into a considerable community by the 1360s. Expatriate weavers from Flanders were allocated the churchyard of St. Laurence Pulteney for meetings and deliberations of their community. The weavers of Brabant were allocated the nearby churchyard of St. Mary Somerset.

== Destruction ==
St Laurence's was destroyed in the Great Fire of London of 1666. An eyewitness told the Government inquiry into the fire that he "saw the Fire break out from the inside of Lawrence Pountney Steeple, when there was no fire near it", implying the possibility of arson. The church was not rebuilt. Instead the parish was united to that of St Mary Abchurch. The old churchyard, which lay to the south side of the church continued to be used for burials; in the 1850s it was converted into the garden of a neighbouring house, then occupied by the architect Edward I'Anson. This 17th-century building, which still exists, is now numbered as 7a Laurence Pountney Hill. The site of the church itself, which became known as the "Church Ground", was used as an additional burial ground following the Great Fire, and is now also a privately owned garden.

== Sources ==
- Jenkinson, Wilberforce (1917). London Churches Before the Great Fire. London: Society for the Promotion of Christian Knowledge.
- Newcourt, Richard (1708). Repetorium Ecclesiasticum Parochiale Londinense. Vol. 1. London.
- Seymour, Robert (1733). A Survey of the Cities of London and Westminster, Borough of Southwark, and Parts Adjacent. Vol. 1. London: T. Read.
