= Coldharbour, City of London =

Area of the City of London

Coordinates: 51.510°N 0.090°W

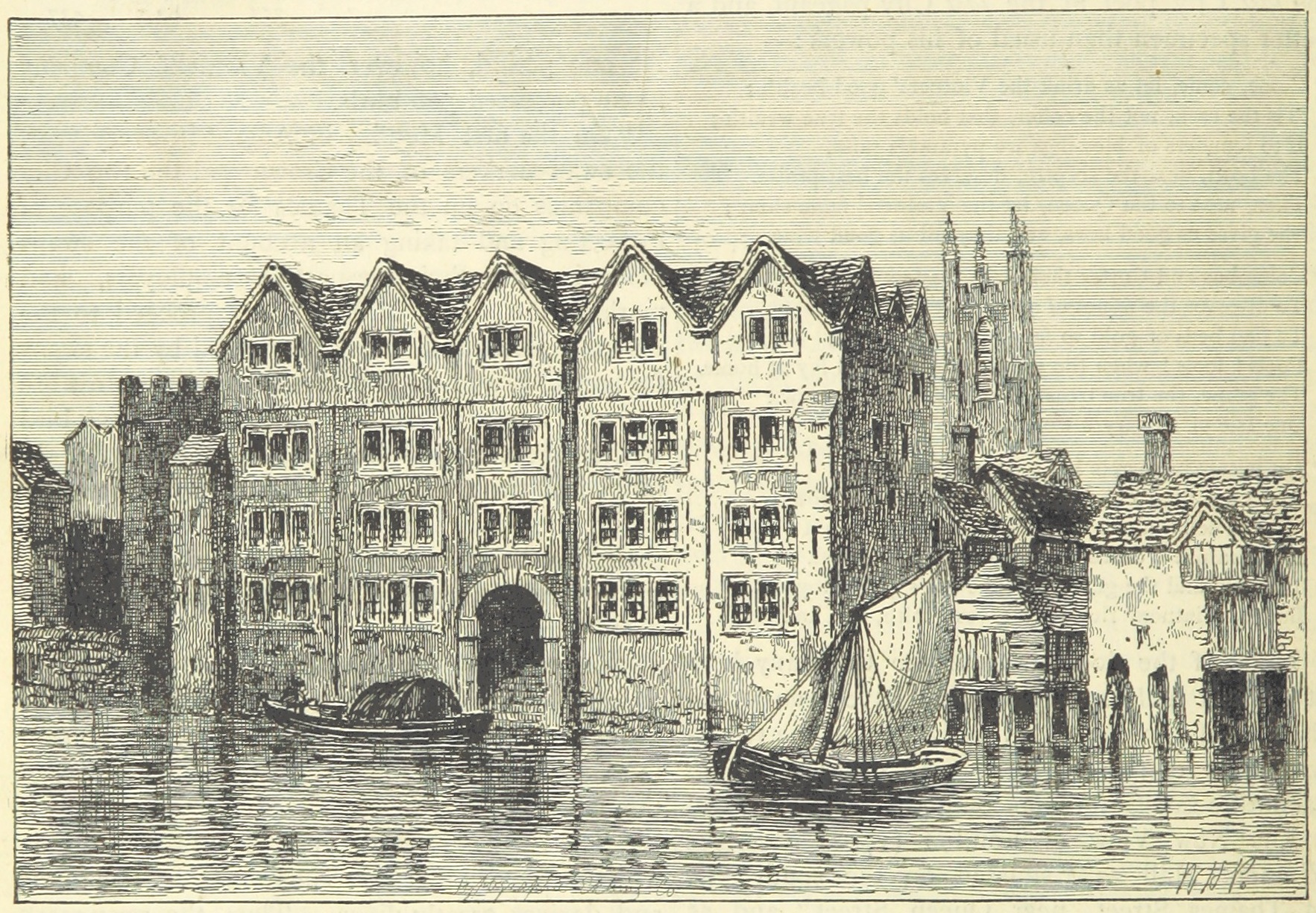
Cold Harbour

Coldharbour, Cold Harbour, Cold Harborough, Cold Herbergh, or Cold Herberge was an area of the City of London during the Middle Ages. It was in the former parishes of All-Hallows-the-Less and All-Hallows-the-Great (now Dowgate Ward). The names originated with two neighbouring medieval estates.

One of the estates, Coldharbour House, belonged to the Dukes of Exeter and was also, briefly, a College of Heralds.

From the 13th century to the mid-17th century, the name Coldharbour referred the area between Upper Thames Street and the Thames, to the east of Steelyard (on the later site of Cannon Street Station). It was a liberty until 1608, when James I brought it within the jurisdiction of the City of London. The area was destroyed in the Great Fire of 1666.

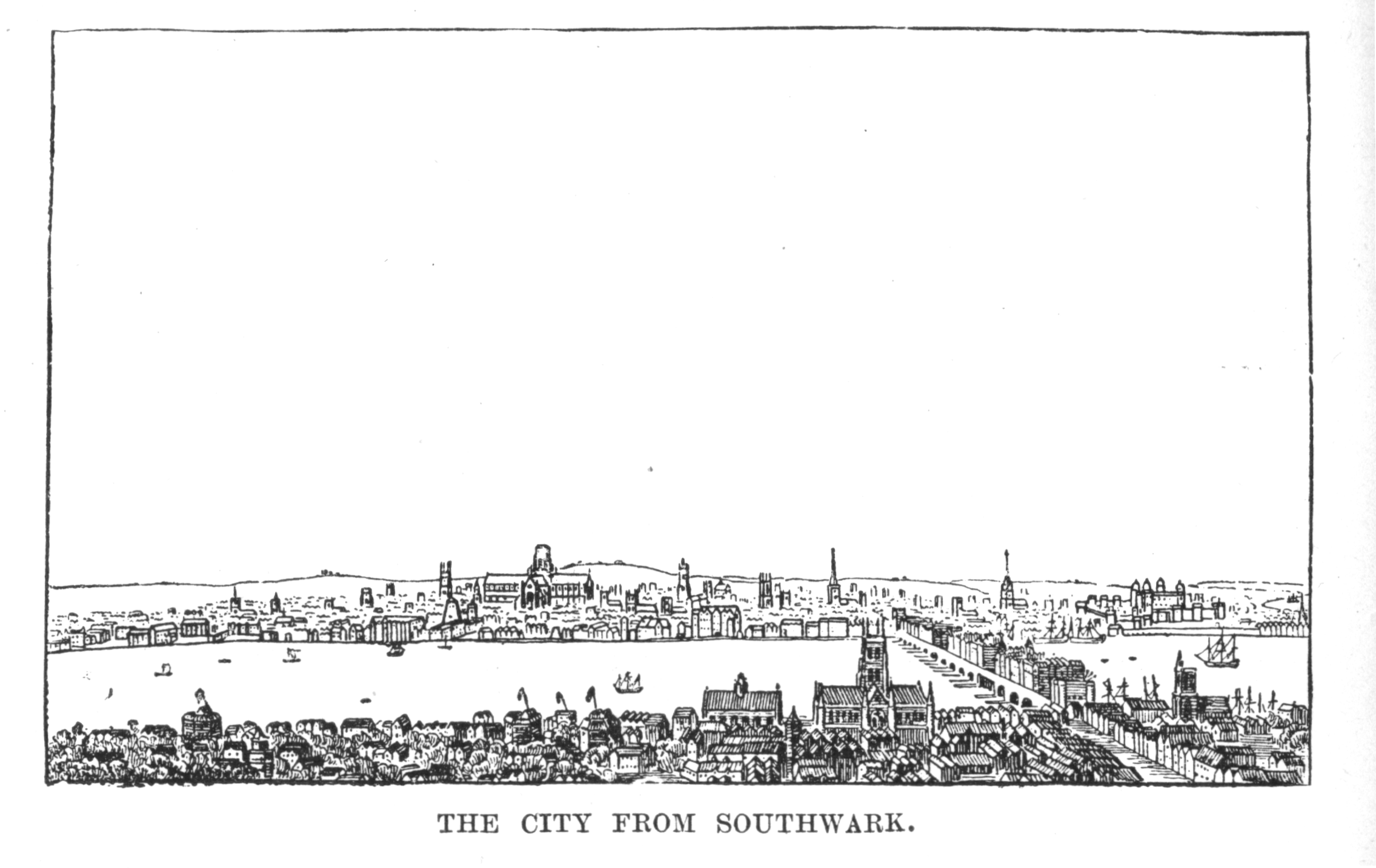
Coldharbour and the City of London from Southwark in Elizabethan times

== Coldharbour House ==
Coldharbour House or Cold Inn was a medieval mansion house on the north bank of the River Thames just upstream from London Bridge and close to the site of today's Cannon Street station.

The house was located in Upper Thames Street, a narrow riverside lane, along with other noblemen's mansions. The house was first mentioned in the reign of Edward II as belonging to the knight Sir John Abel. In 1334 it was bought by the merchant draper Sir John de Pulteney, who was four times Lord Mayor of London in the 1330s, and became known as Pulteney's Inn. At the end of the 14th century, it belonged to John Holland, 1st Duke of Exeter, a half-brother of King Richard II, whom he entertained in the house.

In 1410, King Henry IV granted the property to his son, the future King Henry V. Richard III gave Coldharbour to the College of Arms, of which he was patron, for storing records and to provide living space. Henry VII took possession of the house away from the college and gave it to his mother, Lady Margaret Beaufort, Countess of Richmond and Derby. The house later became the property of the Earls of Shrewsbury, and its name was changed to Shrewsbury House.

Coldharbour was either dismantled by the 6th Earl of Shrewsbury or destroyed by the Great Fire of London in 1666, although a later building with the same name, constructed on the same site, was used as the hall of the Company of Watermen and Lightermen until 1778.

== See also ==
- List of demolished buildings and structures in London

== See also ==
- Watermen's stairs
