= Eastminster =

Medieval abbey in London

Coordinates: 51.5094°N 0.0723°W

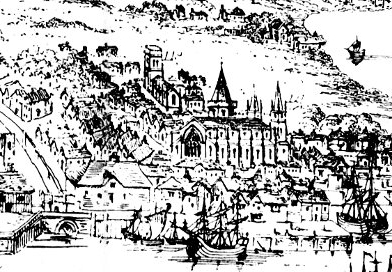
Eastminster, based on a drawing by Anton van den Wyngaerde, 1544

Eastminster, also known as New Abbey, St Mary Graces, and other variants, was a Cistercian abbey on Tower Hill at East Smithfield in London.

== History ==
The abbey was founded by Edward III in 1350 immediately outside the Roman London Wall in what is now the London Borough of Tower Hamlets. It stood just to the north of an older royal foundation, the Hospital and Collegiate Church of St Katharine by the Tower.

Among the abbey's endowments was the reversion of one of the four manors of Shere in Gomshall, Surrey, given by King Edward III in 1350. This manor acquired the name Towerhill, due to its patronage by the abbey.

In 1375, Sir Nicholas de Loveyne bequeathed to the Abbot and Convent the reversion of the mills of Crash Mills, to endow the perpetual singing of masses for the donor. Crash Mills were situated on the River Thames, near East Smithfield.

The Abbey's benefactors were mainly courtiers; it attracted relatively few bequests from the merchants of the City of London.

The abbey was dissolved in 1538. From 1805 to 1966 the site was the home of the Royal Mint, after which it was renamed as Royal Mint Court and used for offices. In 2018 it was sold to the People's Republic of China for conversion into a new London embassy.

A large-scale excavation of the site of the abbey took place between 1983 and 1988. An analysis of the archaeological and documentary evidence uncovered has been published by Museum of London Archaeology.

== Burials at the Abbey ==
- Sir Nicholas de Loveyne
