= Robert Vere (died 1461) =

English soldier and diplomat

Arms of Robert Vere.

Sir Robert Vere (died 1461), of Haccombe, was an English soldier and diplomat that was appointed as Seneschal of Gascony.

== Life ==
Vere was the second son of Richard de Vere, 11th Earl of Oxford and Alice Sergeaux. Knighted in 1426 and was Captain of Caen. He was appointed to the office of Seneschal of Gascony in 1441 and 1445. Vere as Captain of Caen, reinforced an English army in Normandy, under the command of Thomas Kyriell in 1450. A French army under the command of Jean de Bourbon, together with a force of Breton cavalry, under Arthur de Richemont, defeated the English army at the Battle of Formigny, with the remnants of Vere's force retreating to Caen.

He was killed in Cornwall in 1461.

== Marriage and issue ==
Robert married Joan, the widow of Nicholas Carew, daughter of Hugh Courtenay of Haccombe and Philippa Archdekne, they had the following known issue:

- John Vere, married Alice Colbroke, had John de Vere, 15th Earl of Oxford.
- Joan Vere
