= Robert de Vere, 6th Earl of Oxford =

English noble

Robert de Vere
- 6th Earl of Oxford
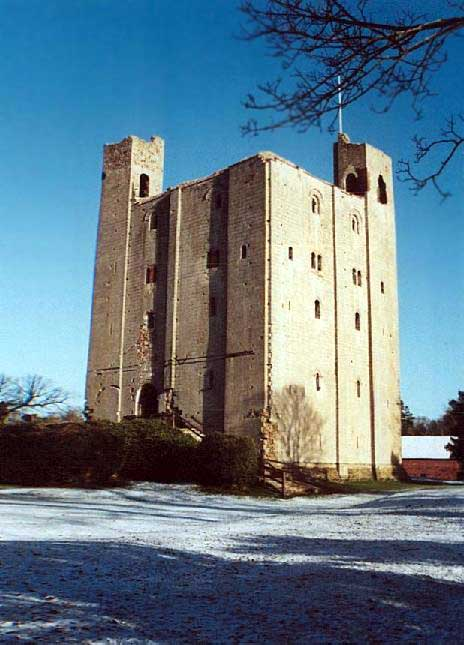
- Hedingham Castle, Essex, seat of the Earls of Oxford
- Born: c. 24 June 1257
- Died: before 17 April 1331 burial at Earls Colne, Essex
- Noble family: de Vere
- Spouse: Margaret de Mortimer
- Issue: Sir Thomas de Vere; Ellen de Vere
- Father: Robert de Vere, 5th Earl of Oxford
- Mother: Alice de Sanford

Arms of Sir Robert de Vere, 6th Earl of Oxford, from the Falkirk Rolls of 1298.

Robert de Vere, 6th Earl of Oxford (c. 24 June 1257 – 17 April 1331) was the son and heir of Robert de Vere, 5th Earl of Oxford, by his wife Alice de Sanford.

Robert the younger took part in several of the military campaigns of Edward I, Edward II and Edward III in Wales, Scotland and France. His coat of arms appears in the 1298 Falkirk Roll at the Battle of Falkirk. He was married to Margaret Mortimer, daughter of Roger Mortimer, 1st Baron Wigmore. He also officiated at the Coronation of Queen Isabella, wife of Edward II, in 1308. His only son Thomas died before him, and when Robert died in 1331, he was succeeded by his nephew John de Vere, 7th Earl of Oxford.

Peerage of England
Preceded by Robert de Vere	Earl of Oxford; 1296–1331	Succeeded by John de Vere
