= Joseph John Skelton =

English engraver

Joseph John Skelton (1783–1871) was an English engraver.

== Life ==
He was brother of William Skelton, and became an engraver specialising in topographical and antiquarian subjects. Before 1819 he went to live at Oxford. He left Oxford in 1830 for Edinburgh (after which he went to France), but had returned to London by 1851. A subscription was raised for him in Oxford in 1856 on account of poverty, and he was granted a place in the Charterhouse in 1859, where he died in 1871. He was elected a Fellow of the Society of Antiquaries of London in 1825; his name disappears from its lists in 1844.

== Works ==
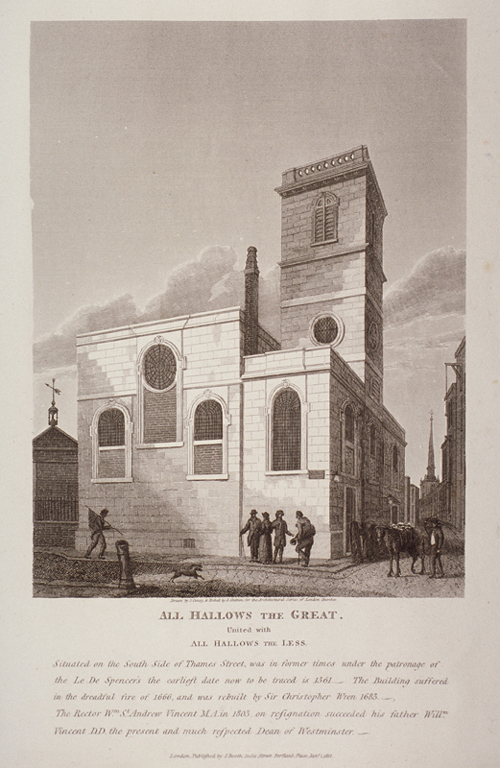
All-Hallows-the-Great, 1812 engraving by Joseph Skelton after John Coney.

At Oxford he published Oxonia Antiqua Illustrata (1823); Antiquities of Oxfordshire, from drawings by F. Mackenzie (1823); Pietas Oxoniensis, or Records of Oxford Founders (1828); and Engraved Illustrations of Antient Arms and Armour from the Collection at Goodrich Court from the Drawings, and with the Descriptions of Dr. Meyrick, (2 volumes, 1830). He also engraved the heading to the Oxford almanacks for the years 1815 to 1831, from drawings by F. Mackenzie and C. Wild; and executed a set of fifty-six etchings of the antiquities of Bristol after Hugh O'Neill, 1825. His Oxfordshire notes and collections are in the Bodleian Library. In 1828, he prepared dozens of plates for Rev. William Morgan Kinsey’s Portugal Illustrated; in a Series of Letters (1st edition, London: Treuttel, Würtz, and Richter, w/ 42 plates; 2nd edition, London: Treuttel and Würtz, Treuttel Jun. and Richter, 1829, with 44 plates), a work now highly prized in Portugal as a collector’s item.

In France he engraved many of the plates to Charles Gavard's Galeries Historiques de Versailles, 1836; Jean Vatout's Le Château d'Eu, 1844; and Eusèbe Girault de Saint-Fargeau's Les Beautés de la France, 1850.
