= Thomas de Vere, 8th Earl of Oxford =

Thomas de Vere
- 8th Earl of Oxford
- Born: c. 1335
- Died: 12 – 18 September 1371; Great Bentley, Essex
- Noble family: de Vere
- Spouse: Maud de Ufford
- Issue: Robert de Vere, 9th Earl of Oxford
- Father: John de Vere, 7th Earl of Oxford
- Mother: Maud de Badlesmere

Thomas de Vere, 8th Earl of Oxford (c. 1336 – September 1371) was the second son of John de Vere, 7th Earl of Oxford, and Maud de Badlesmere.

== Life ==
Thomas was the second son of John de Vere, 7th Earl of Oxford, and Maud de Badlesmere.

In October 1355, as part of Edward the Black Prince's army, Thomas and Reginald Cobham, ransacked the counties of Toulouse and Carcassonne and then returned to Bordeaux with significant spoils. By September 1359, Thomas was being considered for the thirty-six man council to govern England for the minor, Thomas of Woodstock, Duke of Gloucester.

Thomas married, sometime before 10 June 1350, Maud de Ufford, daughter and heir of Sir Ralph de Ufford and Maud of Lancaster. When Thomas died in 1371, he was succeeded by his only son, Robert de Vere, 9th Earl of Oxford.

== Sources ==
- Cushway, Graham (2011). Edward III and the War at Sea: The English Navy, 1327-1377. The Boydell Press. ISBN 9781843836216.
- Ross, James (2015). The Foremost Man of the Kingdom: John de Vere, Thirteenth Earl of Oxford (1442-1513). The Boydell Press. ISBN 9781783270057.

Peerage of England
Preceded by John de Vere	Earl of Oxford; 1360–1371	Succeeded by Robert de Vere
