= Hugh de Vere, 4th Earl of Oxford =

Earl of Oxford

Hugh de Vere
- 4th Earl of Oxford
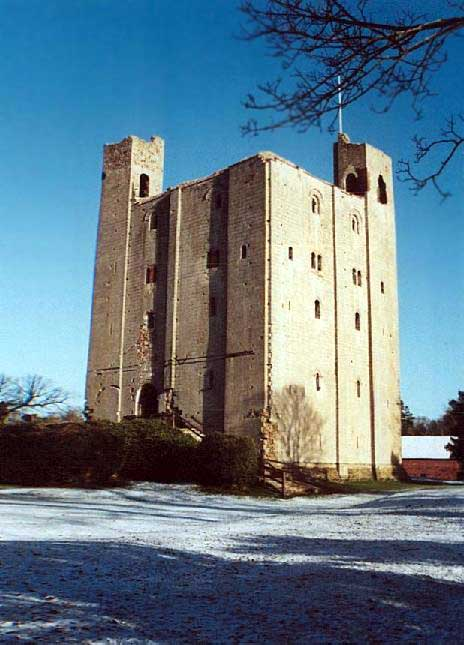
- Hedingham Castle, Essex, seat of the Earls of Oxford
- Born: c. 1207 unknown
- Died: before December 1263 unknown
- Noble family: de Vere
- Spouse: Hawise de Quincy
- Issue: Robert de Vere, 5th Earl of Oxford; Isabel de Vere; Lora de Vere; Margaret de Vere
- Father: Robert de Vere, 3rd Earl of Oxford
- Mother: Isabel de Bolebec

Hugh de Vere, 4th Earl of Oxford (c. 1207 – December 1263) was the only son and heir of Robert de Vere, 3rd Earl of Oxford and Isabel de Bolebec, daughter and eventually sole heiress of Hugh de Bolebec.

== Early life ==
Hugh de Vere was born about 1207. Hugh's mother, Isabel de Bolebec, Countess of Oxford, purchased her minor son's wardship in 1221 from the crown for 6000 marks. Hugh did homage to King Henry III in October 1231, and was knighted by the King at Gloucester on 22 May 1233. Two days later the King 'girt him with the sword of the Earldom of Oxford and directed the sheriff to let him have what he ought to have in the name of the Earldom of Oxford as his predecessors had had'.

== Career ==
He inherited the office of Master Chamberlain of England which had been granted to his great-grandfather Aubrey de Vere II. By right of that office, he participated in the coronation of Queen Eleanor in 1236. Earl Hugh was a critic of King Henry from 1246, and in 1258 and 1259 was elected to serve on various baronial committees attempting to reform royal government. The earl purchased the right to hold a market at the town on his primary estate, Castle Hedingham in Essex, and founded a chantry and hospital there.

== Marriage and issue ==
Hugh de Vere married Hawise de Quincy, daughter of Saer de Quincy, 1st Earl of Winchester, and his wife, Margaret de Beaumont. They had a son and three daughters:

- Robert de Vere, 5th Earl of Oxford.
- Isabel de Vere, who married firstly, Sir John de Courtenay of Okehampton, Devon, and secondly, Oliver de Dinham, Lord Dinham.
- Lora de Vere, who married Reynold d'Argentine of Melbourn, Cambridgeshire.
- Margaret de Vere, who married Hugh de Cressy (d. shortly before 24 April 1263).

Hugh de Vere died before 23 December 1263 and was buried at Earls Colne. His widow was living in 1273 and died on 3 February thereafter. She was buried at Earls Colne Priory.

== Footnotes ==
Political offices
Preceded by Robert de Vere	Lord Great Chamberlain; 1221–1263	Succeeded by Robert de Vere
Peerage of England
Preceded by Robert de Vere	Earl of Oxford; 1221–1263	Succeeded by Robert de Vere
