= John de Vere, 7th Earl of Oxford =

English noble (1312–1360)

John de Vere
- 7th Earl of Oxford
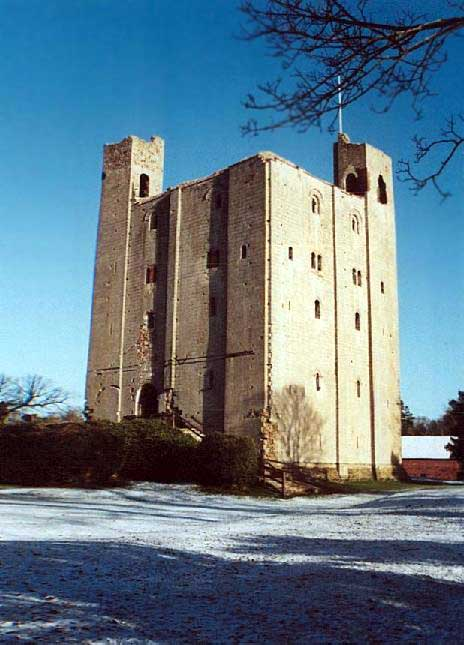
- Hedingham Castle, Essex, seat of the Earls of Oxford
- Born: c. 12 March 1312
- Died: 23 or 24 January 1360; Rheims, France
- Noble family: de Vere
- Spouse: Maud de Badlesmere
- Issue: John de Vere; Thomas de Vere, 8th Earl of Oxford; Aubrey de Vere, 10th Earl of Oxford; Robert de Vere; Margaret de Vere; Maud de Vere; Elizabeth de Vere
- Father: Alphonse de Vere
- Mother: Joan Foliot

John de Vere, 7th Earl of Oxford (c. 12 March 1312 – 24 January 1360) was the nephew and heir of Robert de Vere, 6th Earl of Oxford who succeeded as Earl of Oxford in 1331, after his uncle died without issue.

John de Vere was a trusted captain of Edward III in the king's wars in Scotland and France, and took part in both the Battle of Crécy and the Battle of Poitiers. He died campaigning in France in 1360. Throughout his career, he was closely associated with William de Bohun, 1st Earl of Northampton, who was his brother-in-law.

== Family background and marriage ==
John de Vere was the only son of Alphonse de Vere, and Jane, daughter of Sir Richard Foliot. Alphonse was the third son of Robert de Vere, 5th Earl of Oxford and apparently died shortly before 20 December 1328, when a writ was issued for inquisitions post mortem into the land that he held direct from the King. These hearings established that Alphonse's next heir was his son John, then aged 15 years and more. The manors concerned were Aston Sandford, Buckinghamshire, Westwick by St Albans and Great Hormead, Hertfordshire, as well as property at Beaumont and Althorne in Essex.

Alphonse was a brother of Robert de Vere, 6th Earl of Oxford. When the 6th Earl's son died without issue in 1329, he obtained licence from the king to entail his estates on his nephew, John. It was in this way that John de Vere, when his uncle died 17 April 1331, became Earl of Oxford. He had made homage and received livery by 17 May.

In 1336 John married Maud de Badlesmere, who was the second of the four daughters of Bartholomew de Badlesmere, 1st Baron Badlesmere, of Badlesmere in Kent and Margaret de Clare. Maud was a co-heiress of her brother Giles de Badlesmere, 2nd Baron Badlesmere. When Giles died in 1338, this brought a significant part of the Badlesmere inheritance into de Vere's hands. The marriage also forged a strong bond with William Bohun, Earl of Northampton, who had married Badlesmere's third daughter, Elizabeth de Badlesmere, and thus became Oxford's brother-in-law. The two campaigned together, sat on the same commissions and died the same year.

== Career ==
De Vere's military career began with service on Edward III's Scottish campaigns, in the 1330s Second War of Scottish Independence. He took part in the Roxburgh campaign of 1334–5, and in the summer campaign of 1335. Later in the decade, England's military efforts turned towards France, with the beginning of the Hundred Years' War.

Fearing a French invasion of England, Oxford was made responsible for the defence of London and the Essex coast. In the spring of 1340, de Vere and Thomas Beauchamp, 11th Earl of Warwick were summoned to reinforce the Earl of Salisbury in Flanders with two hundred men to counter a French invasion of the Low Countries. Despite the urgency of the order, Oxford and Warwick did not arrive until April and then with barely two dozen men.

While serving in the Low Countries, Oxford was therefore out of the country during Edward's disputes with Archbishop John de Stratford. Oxford was not forced to take sides in the conflict, and has been described as a "political neutral".

After a period in England, de Vere returned to the continent in 1342, where he served with Northampton, who had been made lieutenant of Brittany. They both took part in the Battle of Morlaix that year. The next year the two earls were sent to Scotland to relieve Lochmaben Castle, and in 1345 they were again campaigning in Brittany. Tradition has it that, returning to England, their ships were forced ashore by bad weather, and the party was robbed of their possessions by the locals.

In the summer of 1346 de Vere was campaigning with the king in Normandy, and took part in the Battle of Crécy. According to the chronicler Froissart, de Vere was fighting with the Black Prince, and was among the captains who sent a request to Edward III for reinforcements when the king famously answered 'Let the boy win his spurs'. Oxford was also at the siege of Calais, but reportedly fell ill in 1348, and did not take part in any major campaigning until 1355.

In 1355, he was again in the company of the Black Prince as an advisor and commander, and took part in the prince's great raid in Languedoc. Alongside the earls of Suffolk and Salisbury, Oxford commanded a large force of one thousand men that marched up the Dordogne valley and invaded the great viscounty of Turenne. Oxford's men captured numerous towns and castles in Turenne, garrisoning them to launch raids into the surrounding provinces until they were bought out in the fall of 1357.

On 19 September 1356, at the Battle of Poitiers, Oxford was in command of the vanguard together with the Earl of Warwick. While Warwick's men bore the brunt of the French attack, de Vere led a group of archers along the riverbed until they were able to flank the French cavalry, firing upon the poorly protected rumps of their horses. Oxford's attack inflicted significant damage and did much to secure the English victory.

His last campaign was Edward III's Rheims campaign in 1359–60. Here he died, probably during the raid into Burgundy, on 23 or 24 January 1360. He was buried in the de Vere family's burial place Colne Priory in Essex.

== Descendants and assessment ==
Maud de Vere died in 1366. The couple had four sons and three daughters. The eldest son, John, married Elizabeth Courtenay, daughter of Hugh Courtenay, 10th Earl of Devon, but died before his father, in 1350. (After the death of her husband, Elizabeth married Sir Andrew Luttrell of Chilton (in Thorverton), Devon.) Another son, Robert, also died in his father's lifetime. The eldest remaining son was then Thomas, born about 1336 or 1337, who succeeded his father in 1360. Thomas's son Robert de Vere, 9th Earl of Oxford succeeded at his father's death, but with Robert's forfeiture in 1392, the earldom was given to Robert's uncle Aubrey – the seventh earl's fourth son. The eldest daughter, Margaret, married three times, while of the second, Matilda, little is known. The third daughter, Elizabeth, married Sir Hugh Courtenay, eldest son and heir of Hugh de Courtenay, 10th Earl of Devon.

John de Vere, in the family tradition of the "fighting de Veres", was active in almost all major military engagements in the years from 1340 to 1360. On the Roxburgh campaign he brought a retinue of twenty-eight men-at-arms and twelve mounted archers. In Brittany in 1342, the retinue had grown to forty men-at-arms, one banneret, nine knights, twenty-nine esquires, and thirty mounted archers. His retinue was of diverse composition, and also included foreign mercenaries. At one point, in the Battle of Poitiers, John Hawkwood, who was later to make his fortune as a condottiero in Italy, also served with de Vere. Yet in spite of this, de Vere never distinguished himself, particularly as a military commander. Neither did he receive a great amount of royal patronage, and was never made a member of the Order of the Garter. This was largely a consequence of the de Vere family's relatively modest resources among the English peerage. As an example can be mentioned that in late 1340, £349 were owed to Oxford in arrears for his services, yet at the same time, the king owed Northampton two debts of £782 and £1237. This obstacle of resources and status John de Vere was unable to overcome either by marriage or warfare.

== De Vere family tree ==
Robert, 5th Earl (c. 1240–1296)
Robert, 6th earl (1257–1331)	Alfonso († 1328)	Bartholomew de Badlesmere (1275–1322)
John, 7th earl (1312–1360)	Maud († 1366)	Elizabeth († 1356)	William de Bohun (c.1312–1360)
John († c. 1350)	Robert († bf. 1360)	Thomas, 8th earl (c. 1336-1371)	Aubrey, 10th earl (1338x40–1400)
Robert, 9th earl (1362–1392)	Richard, 11th earl (1385–1417)

Peerage of England
Preceded by Robert de Vere	Earl of Oxford; 1331–1360	Succeeded by Thomas de Vere
