= Robert de Vere, 5th Earl of Oxford =

English noble (1240–1296)

Robert de Vere
- 5th Earl of Oxford
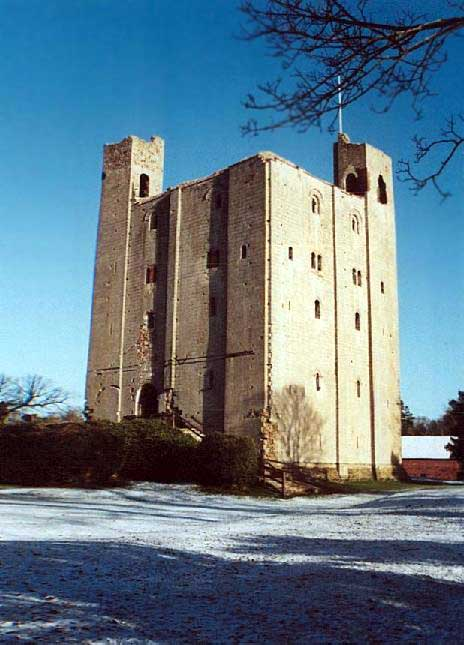
- Hedingham Castle, Essex, seat of the Earls of Oxford
- Born: c. 1220
- Died: before 7 September 1296 burial at Earls Colne, Essex; heart burial at Ipswich, Suffolk
- Noble family: de Vere
- Spouse: Alice de Sanford
- Issue: Robert de Vere, 6th Earl of Oxford; Hugh de Vere, 1st Baron Vere; Thomas de Vere; Gilbert de Vere; Philip de Vere; Joan de Vere; Hawise de Vere
- Father: Hugh de Vere, 4th Earl of Oxford
- Mother: Hawise de Quincy

Robert de Vere, 5th Earl of Oxford (c. 1220 – 1296) was the son and heir of Hugh de Vere, 4th Earl of Oxford, and chamberlain to Queen Eleanor.

== Early life ==
Robert de Vere was born about 1220, the only son of Hugh de Vere, 4th Earl of Oxford, and Hawise de Quincy, daughter of Saer de Quincy, 1st Earl of Winchester. He had three sisters, Isabel, Lora and Margaret.

== Career ==
Robert de Vere's marriage brought into his family the role of chamberlain to Henry III's queen Eleanor. He was among the followers of Simon de Montfort during the Second Barons' War, and was with Simon's son, Simon the Younger, when Edward I of England attacked Kenilworth Castle prior to the Battle of Evesham. De Vere's title and property were forfeited, but restored shortly afterwards by the Dictum of Kenilworth.

== Marriage and issue ==
Before 22 February 1252, he married Alice de Sanford, daughter and heiress of Gilbert de Sanford. They had six sons and two daughters:

- Robert de Vere, 6th Earl of Oxford, who married Margaret de Mortimer, daughter of Roger Mortimer, 1st Baron Mortimer
- Sir Hugh de Vere, who married Denise de Munchensy, daughter and heiress of Sir William de Munchensy of Swanscombe, Kent
- Sir Alphonse de Vere, who married Jane Foliot, daughter of Sir Jordan Foliot, Lord Foliot, and by her was the father of John de Vere, 7th Earl of Oxford
- Thomas de Vere
- Gilbert de Vere, a cleric
- Philip de Vere, a cleric
- Joan de Vere, who married Sir William de Warenne
- Hawise de Vere

== Death ==
Robert de Vere died before 7 September 1296. His widow, Alice, died at Canfield, Essex on 7 September 1312. They were both buried at Earls Colne, Essex. The heart of Robert de Vere was buried separately at the Ipswich Greyfriars, which was the burial place of Margaret Mortimer, wife of the 6th Earl.

== Footnotes ==
Political offices
Preceded by Hugh de Vere	Lord Great Chamberlain; 1263–1265	Succeeded by Forfeited
Peerage of England
Preceded by Hugh de Vere	Earl of Oxford; 1263–1265 (forfeited); 1267–1296	Succeeded by Robert de Vere
