= Aubrey de Vere, 10th Earl of Oxford =

Son of John de Vere, 7th Earl of Oxford (c. 1338–1400)

Aubrey de Vere
- 10th Earl of Oxford
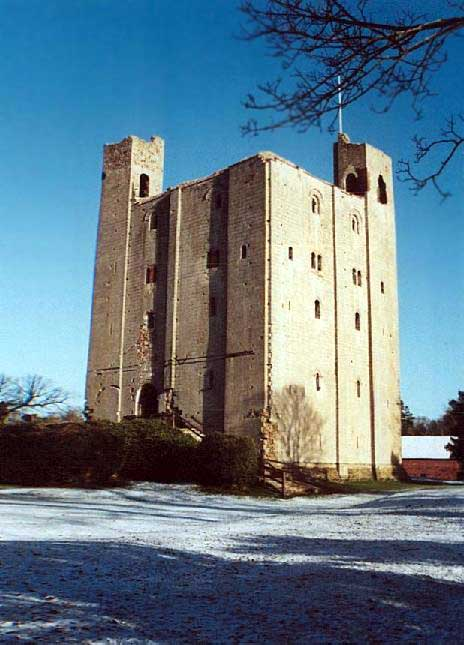
- Hedingham Castle, Essex, seat of the Earls of Oxford
- Born: c. 1338
- Died: 23 April 1400
- Noble family: de Vere
- Spouse: Alice Fitzwalter
- Issue: Richard de Vere, 11th Earl of Oxford; John de Vere; Alice de Vere
- Father: John de Vere, 7th Earl of Oxford
- Mother: Maud de Badlesmere

Aubrey de Vere, 10th Earl of Oxford (c. 1338 – 23 April 1400) was the third son of John de Vere, 7th Earl of Oxford and Maud de Badlesmere, daughter of Bartholomew de Badlesmere, 1st Lord Badlesmere.

Aubrey de Vere had three brothers, John, Thomas, and Robert, and three sisters. Margaret, Maud and Elizabeth. His eldest brother, John, married the daughter of Hugh Courtenay, Earl of Devon, but died in 1350 during his father's lifetime. Another brother, Robert, also died in his father's lifetime. Aubrey de Vere's third brother, Thomas, succeeded his father as 8th Earl of Oxford, and was in turn succeeded by his only son, Robert de Vere, 9th Earl of Oxford, who died in 1392 without issue, leaving Aubrey de Vere to inherit the earldom.

In 1360 Aubrey de Vere was made steward of the royal forest of Havering in Essex. In 1367 was retained to 'abide for life' with the Black Prince, with a substantial allowance. He was knighted, made constable of Wallingford Castle in 1375 and also given the honours of Wallingford and St. Valery, though he gave up Wallingford in 1378 for Hadleigh Castle. Edward III used him as an ambassador in seeking peace with France. In 1381, de Vere became a Chamberlain of the Royal Household and member of the privy council. In 1388 his nephew, Robert de Vere, Duke of Ireland and 9th Earl of Oxford was deemed a traitor, causing Aubrey to lose his post of chamberlain. However, after Robert's death in 1392, the king gave Aubrey the title of Earl of Oxford allowing him to take a seat in parliament. Aubrey's son, Richard became the 11th Earl of Oxford on his death.

An administrator of Aubrey de Veer appears as William Tasburgh, of Raylegh, parson, in 1401.

== Footnotes ==
Peerage of England
Preceded by Robert de Vere	Earl of Oxford; 1393–1400	Succeeded by Richard de Vere
