= Richard de Vere, 11th Earl of Oxford =

English peer (1385–1417)

Richard de Vere
- 11th Earl of Oxford
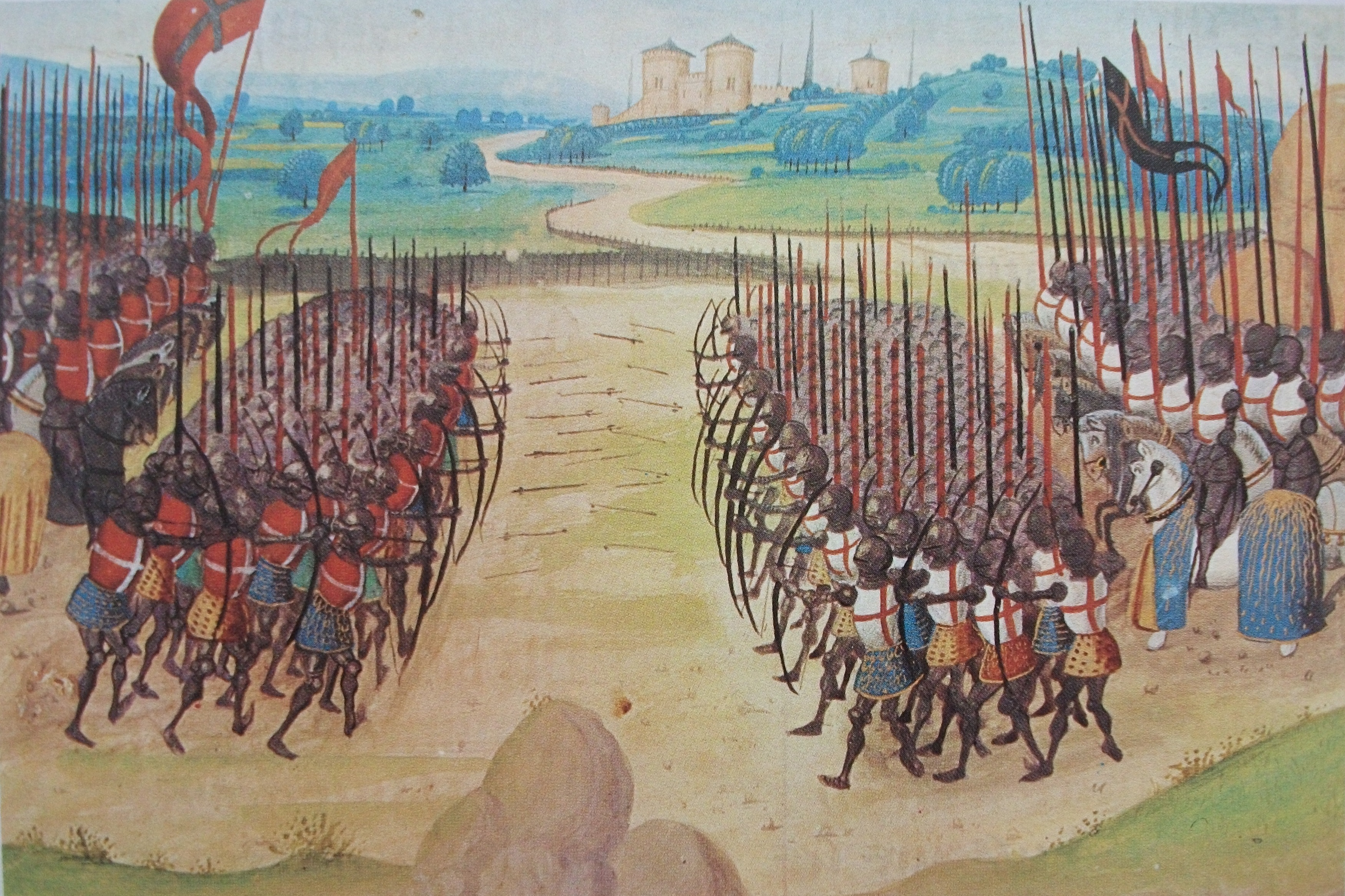
- Battle of Agincourt, 15th century miniature
- Born: 15 August 1385; Hedingham Castle, Essex, England
- Died: 15 February 1417 (aged 31); Earls Colne, Essex, England
- Buried: Earls Colne, Essex, England
- Noble family: de Vere
- Spouses: Alice Holland; Alice Sergeaux
- Issue: John de Vere, 12th Earl of Oxford; Sir Robert Vere; Sir Richard Vere
- Father: Aubrey de Vere, 10th Earl of Oxford
- Mother: Alice Fitzwalter

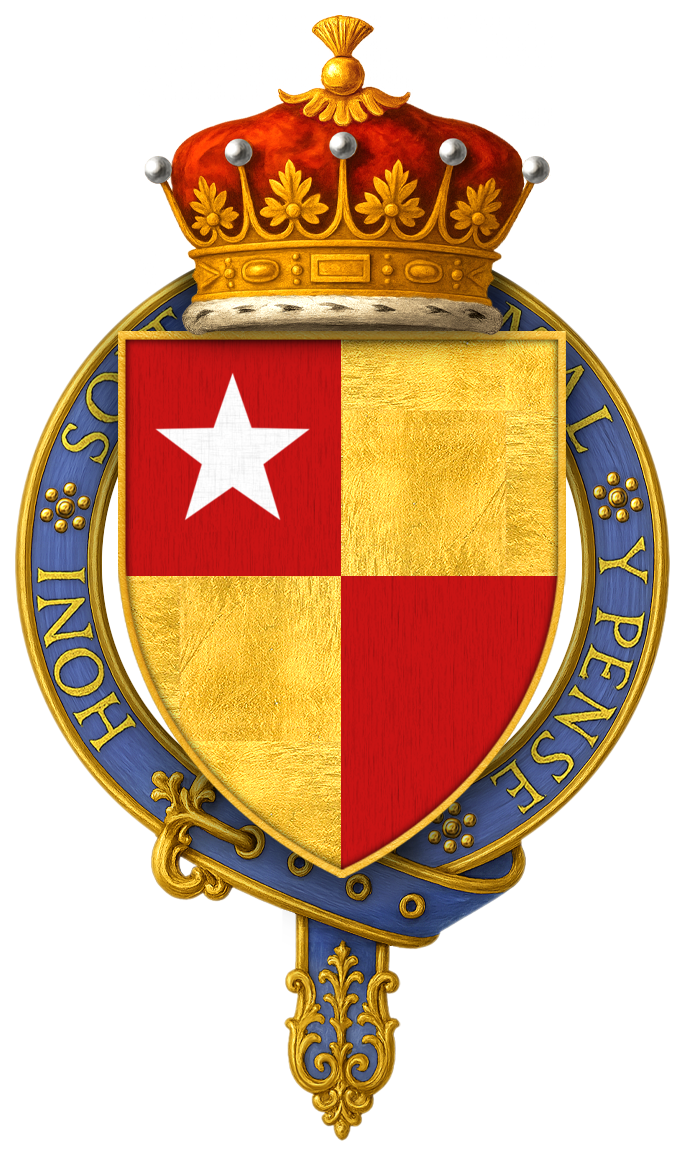
Arms of Sir Richard de Vere, 11th Earl of Oxford, KG

Richard de Vere, 11th Earl of Oxford KG (15 August 1385 – 15 February 1417) was the son and heir of Aubrey de Vere, 10th Earl of Oxford. He took part in the trial of Richard, Earl of Cambridge, and Lord Scrope for their part in the Southampton Plot, and was one of the commanders at Agincourt in 1415.

== Career ==
Richard de Vere, born 15 August 1385, was the eldest son of Aubrey de Vere, 10th Earl of Oxford, and his wife Alice Fitzwalter, daughter of John, 3rd Baron Fitzwalter, by Eleanor Percy, daughter of Henry de Percy, 2nd Baron Percy. The 10th Earl died on 23 April 1400 while Richard was underage. His wardship was initially granted to his mother, but after her death on 29 April 1401, King Henry IV granted it to his mother-in-law, Joan de Bohun, Countess of Hereford. Oxford had livery of his lands on 21 December 1406 without proof of age.

From 1410 onwards Oxford was appointed as a commissioner in Essex on various occasions, and in November 1411 was a Trier of Petitions from overseas in Parliament.

In August 1412 Oxford was among those who sailed to Normandy under Thomas of Lancaster, 1st Duke of Clarence, to aid the Armagnac party against the Burgundians. According to Pugh, the members of the nobility who accompanied the Duke of Clarence on this expedition did so in hope of financial gain, Oxford's earldom, in particular, having suffered from forfeitures and attainders during the lives of his predecessors which had made him 'the poorest member of the English higher nobility'. Another member of the Duke of Clarence's expedition was Richard, 3rd Earl of Cambridge, and three years later, on 5 August 1415, Oxford was among the peers at the trial, presided over by the Duke of Clarence, which condemned to death Cambridge and Lord Scrope for their part in the Southampton Plot on the eve of Henry V's invasion of France. A few days later Oxford sailed to France with the King, and was one of the commanders at Agincourt on 25 October 1415.

In May 1416 Oxford was invested with the Order of the Garter, and in that year sailed with the fleet to relieve Harfleur, taking part in the naval battle at the mouth of the Seine on 15 August.

Oxford died on 15 February 1417, aged 31, and was buried at Earls Colne, Essex. His widow, Alice, married Sir Nicholas Thorley, of London, Bobbingworth, Essex, and Sawtres (in Thundridge), Hertfordshire, Sheriff of Essex and Hertfordshire, 1431–2. He served in the contingent of Humphrey, Duke of Gloucester, at the Battle of Agincourt in 1415. He and his wife, Countess Alice, presented to the churches of Badlesmere, Kent, 1421, Aston Sandford, Buckinghamshire, 1422, and St Erme, Cornwall, 1432. In October 1421 he was brought before a court consisting of the Regent, Beaufort, the Chancellor, Treasurer, Privy Seal, Justices of either Bench, and others of the council, and acknowledged that he had married the widowed Countess of Oxford without the king's permission. The Chancellor took into the king's hands all of the lands of the Countess until he made a fine for their recovery, and sent him to the Tower in irons, where he remained until February 1424, when the Countess had paid a full year's value of her lands. Alice obtained a papal indult for plenary remission in 1426. In November 1426 he and his wife, Alice, were fully pardoned for having married without royal licence. In 1436 he and John Robessart, Knt. owed 110 marks to Lawrence Downe, Gent. In 1440 he and his wife, Alice, Countess of Oxford, John Passheley, and John Marny, Esq., sued John Balle, of Chipping Norton, Oxfordshire, yeoman, in the Court of Common Pleas regarding a debt. Sir Nicholas Thorley died on 5 May 1442. His widow, Alice, Countess of Oxford, died on 18 May 1452, and was buried at Earls Colne, Essex.

== Marriages and issue ==
Oxford married twice:

- Firstly at some time before 1399, to Alice Holland, daughter of John Holland, 1st Duke of Exeter by his wife Princess Elizabeth, sister of King Henry IV and daughter of John of Gaunt, Duke of Lancaster. Without progeny.
- Secondly in about 1406 or 1407 he married Alice Sergeaux (c. 1386 – 18 May 1452), widow of Guy St Aubyn of St Erme, Cornwall, and daughter of Sir Richard Sergeaux of Colquite, Cornwall by his second wife, Philippe de Arundel (d. c. 1399), a daughter and co-heiress of Sir Edmund de Arundel, the bastardized son of Richard Fitzalan, 10th Earl of Arundel by his first wife Isabel Despenser, which marriage was annulled in 1344. By Alice Sergeaux he had three sons:
  - John de Vere, 12th Earl of Oxford, eldest son and heir.
  - Sir Robert Vere (1410–1461), of Haccombe, Devon, who married (as her second husband) Joan Courtenay (d. before 3 August 1465), a daughter of Sir Hugh Courtenay (d. 1425) of Haccombe in Devon (by his second wife Philippa Archdekne, heiress of Haccombe) and widow of Sir Nicholas Carew (d. before 20 April 1448) of Mohuns Ottery in Devon, of Carew Castle in Pembrokeshire and of Moulesford in Berkshire. By Joan Courtenay he had one son and one daughter:
    - John Vere (d. before 15 March 1488), who married Alice Kilrington (Alias: Colbroke), and by her was father of John de Vere, 15th Earl of Oxford.
    - Joan de Vere
  - Sir Richard Vere, who married Margaret Percy (d. 22 September 1464), widow of Henry Grey, 6th Baron Grey of Codnor (d. 17 July 1444), and daughter and co-heiress of Sir Henry Percy 'of Atholl' of Harthill, Yorkshire, by his wife Elizabeth Bardolf, daughter of William Bardolf, 4th Baron Bardolf by his wife Agnes Poynings.

== Footnotes ==
Peerage of England
Preceded by Aubrey de Vere	Earl of Oxford; 1406–1417	Succeeded by John de Vere
