= All-Hallows-the-Great =

Coordinates: 51.5100°N 0.0902°W

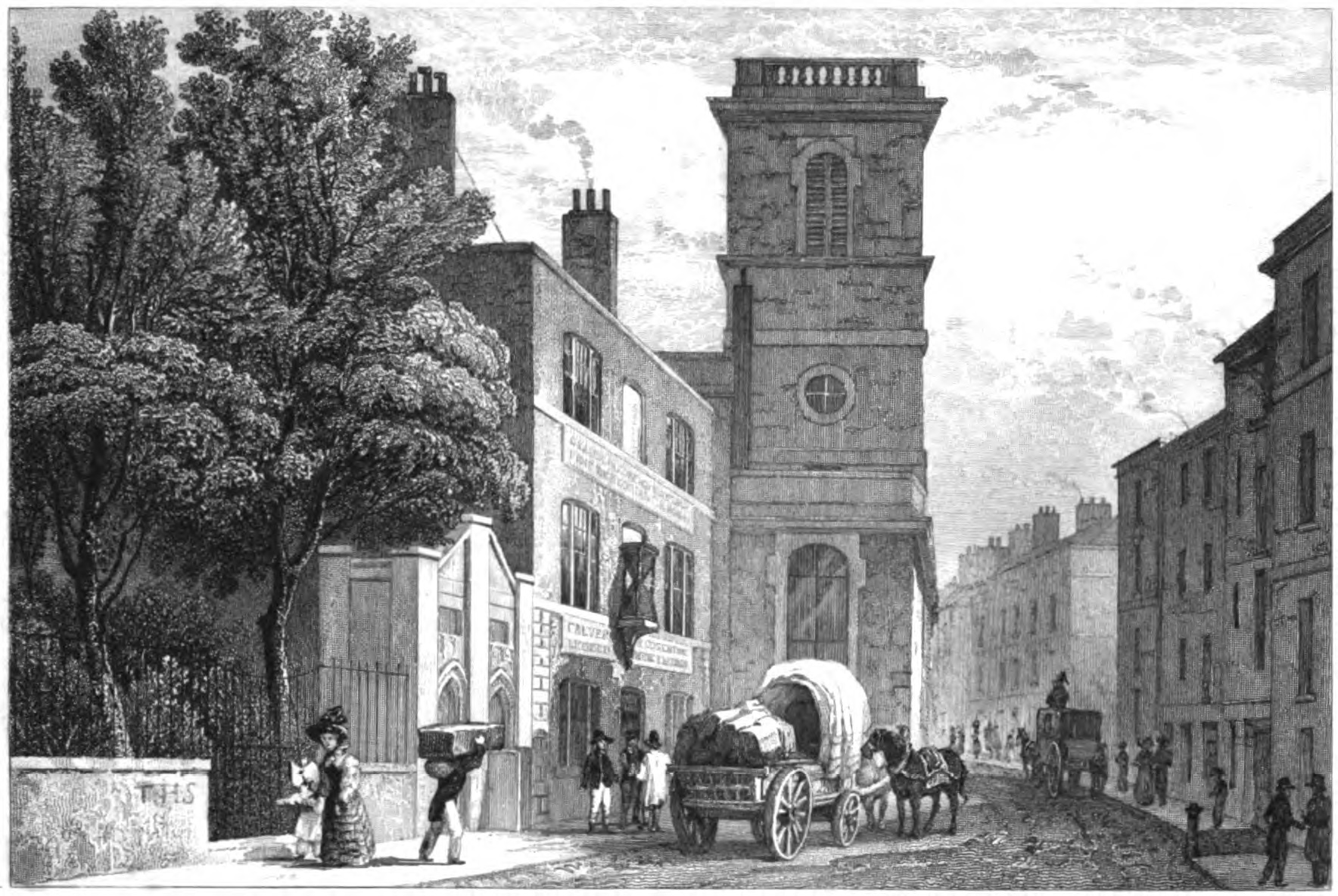
- All-Hallows-the-Great
- Location: Upper Thames Street, London
- Country: England
- Denomination: Anglican

Architecture
- Architect: Christopher Wren
- Style: Baroque
- Demolished: 1894

All-Hallows-the-Great was a church in the City of London, located on what is now Upper Thames Street, first mentioned in 1235. Destroyed in the Great Fire of London of 1666, the church was rebuilt by the office of Sir Christopher Wren. All-Hallows-the-Great was demolished in 1894 when many bodies were disinterred from the churchyard and reburied at Brookwood Cemetery.

== History ==
All Hallows (meaning "All Saints") was one of eight churches in London having the same dedication. The church's suffix was given to distinguish it from another All Hallows located above a gate in a large house nearby, which was known as All-Hallows-the-Less.

The earliest surviving reference is in a charter of Bishop Gilbert of London in 1100–07, as Omnium Sanctorum in London quae dicitur Semannesire (All Saints that is called Seamen's church, in London). Other early records refer to the church by a number of names, including All Hallows the More, All Hallows Thames Street, All Hallows in the Hay and All Hallows in the Ropery. According to John Stow, the latter descriptions were given because hay was sold at the nearby Hay Wharf and ropes were made in the high street.

All-Hallows-the-Great was also the church of the German community of the nearby Steelyard, since the Hanseatic community had only a chapel of their own on the Steelyard premises. The church was sufficiently large to include a large cloister on its south side and accommodate a grammar school, founded by Henry VI in 1447.

During the Commonwealth, All-Hallows-the-Great was a centre for the Fifth Monarchy Men, a millenarian sect that preached the coming of the reign of saints following the demise of the fifth rule of kings, as prophesied in the Book of Daniel. The recent beheading of Charles I, and the looming of the year 1666 was interpreted as a sign that the end of the fifth rule of kings was nigh. The effect of the radical doctrine on the congregation may be surmised by Samuel Pepys's account of their setting up the Royal coat of arms of Charles II, one month before the Restoration. After the Restoration, however, the parish petitioned the Archbishop for the retention of Robert Bragge, the Commonwealth incumbent, who they claimed was "sound in doctrine and of a holy conversation."

After the church's destruction in the Great Fire, the parish was combined with that of All-Hallows-the-Less. In 1669, the joint parishes erected a temporary structure in the churchyard of All-Hallows-the-Great in which to hold services while the body of the church was being restored. This was the first of 27 tabernacles erected in the City of London in the years immediately following the Fire, from funds collected from the coal tax, for the temporary use of parishes. Two of the parishes (St. Mary Somerset and St. Andrew-by-the-Wardrobe) waited 22 years after the Fire before their churches were complete. The church of All-Hallows-the-Great was rebuilt between 1677 and 1684 at a cost of £5,641. A watch house was later built in the churchyard as a precaution against grave robbers.

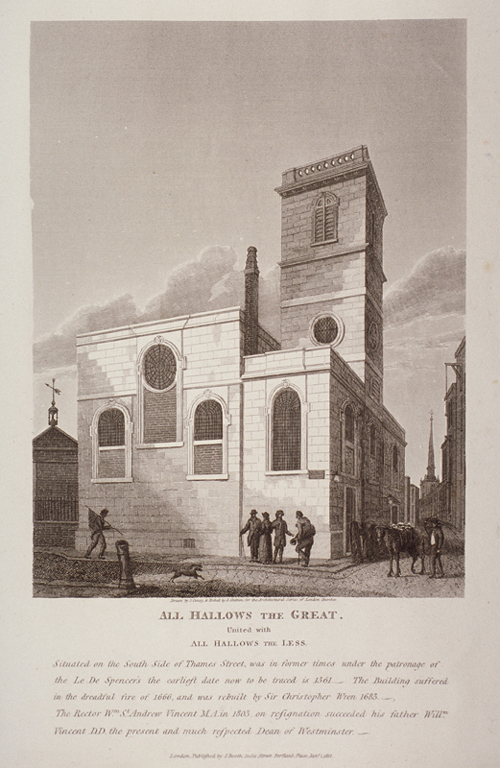
All-Hallows-the-Great, 1812 engraving by Joseph Skelton after John Coney.

By the eighteenth century, traffic on Thames Street was such that passing cart-wheels almost touched the north wall of the church. Traffic in the City increased as the local population decreased during the latter half of the nineteenth century, with the development of the suburbs and the conversion of the City to a place of work. The tower and north aisle of All-Hallows-the-Great were demolished in 1876 so that Upper Thames Street could be widened. A new tower was built on the south, but in 1894, the rest of the church was demolished, the furnishings dispersed and the parish combined with that of St. Michael Paternoster Royal. Sale of the site realised £13,129, which was used to build All Hallows, Gospel Oak.

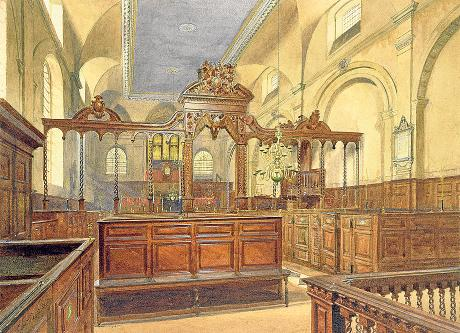
All Hallows the Great, John Crowther, watercolour, 1884.

The City of London Brewery was built on the site. This was destroyed during the Second World War. The churchyard and rebuilt tower survived until 1964. The location was then occupied by Mondial House, completed in 1975 as the largest telephone exchange in Europe. This, in turn, was demolished in 2006, to make way for low-level office development now known as Watermark Place

== Architecture ==
The church was a slightly irregular rectangle with exposed north and west frontages. The exterior was plain and the number of visits made by Robert Hooke to the site suggest that it was his design. The tower survived the Fire and long before work on the church began, molten bell metal was salvaged from the church's ruins and recast into a new bell. This was hung in the old tower in 1671. The effects of the Fire belatedly became evident in its structure, as it was taken down and rebuilt in 1684. It was plain, with round headed windows and a balustrade.

The request sent by the Church Commissioners to Wren that "the Tower of All Hallows-the-Great be forthwith finished with a cupola or spire as you shall best approve of, by reason it stands conspicuous to the Thames" was never acted upon.

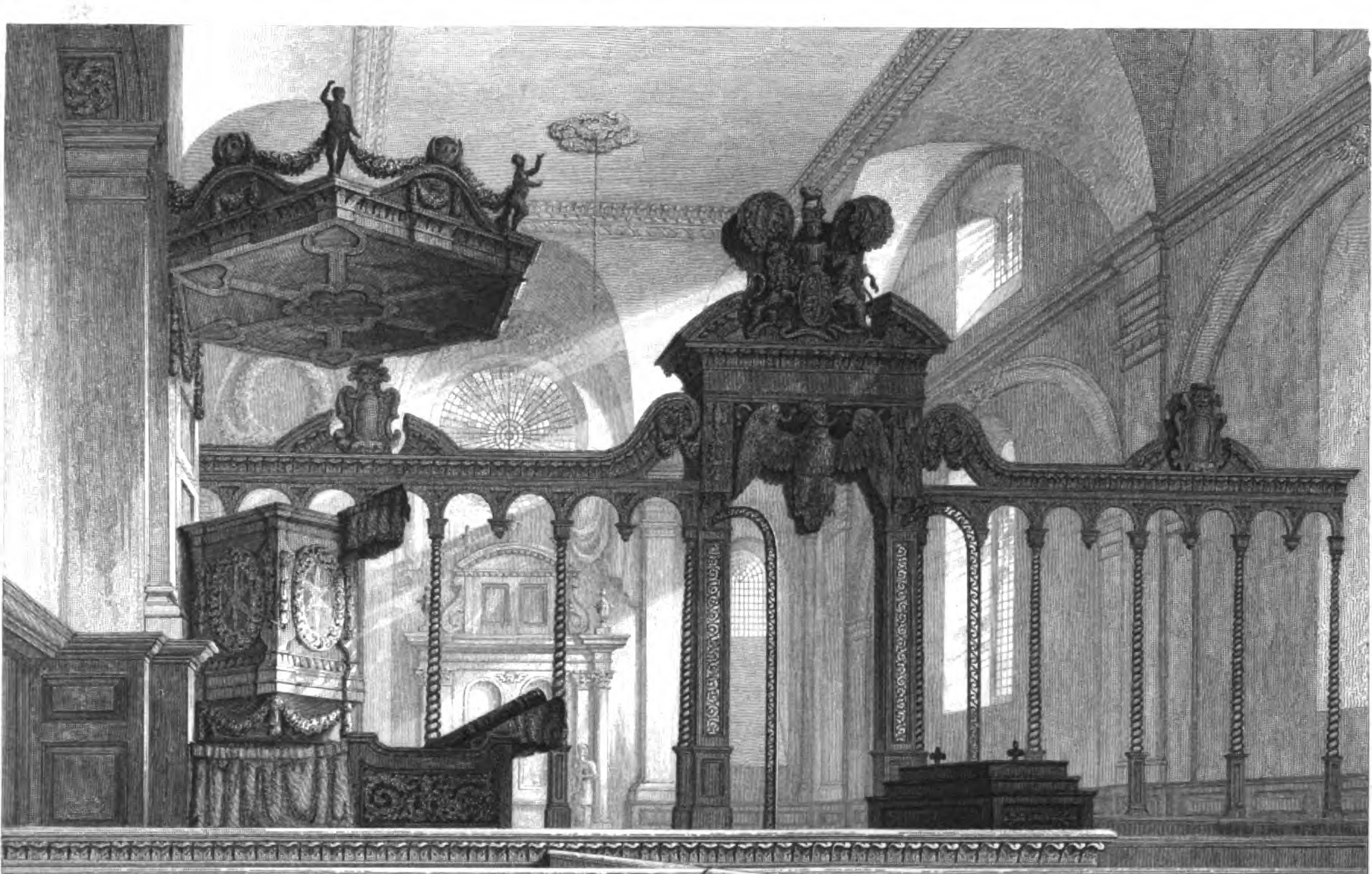
The carved rood screen and the sounding board which were later moved to St Margaret Lothbury

The church was rich in furnishings, many of which survive in other churches. It was one of two Wren churches to have a rood screen, commissioned by the parish after seeing that erected for St Peter upon Cornhill (the tradition that it was a gift from a member of the German merchant community is without foundation). Installed in the church at the time it was completed, it can now be seen in St Margaret Lothbury.

At its completion, it was the only Wren church to have contemporary non-memorial statues. The life size images of Moses and Aaron flanking the Decalogue on the reredos are now in St Michael Paternoster Royal, which also received the lectern (now stolen) and the chandelier. The former pulpit of All-Hallows-the-Great is now in St. Paul's Hammersmith.

== See also ==
- List of Christopher Wren churches in London
- List of churches rebuilt after the Great Fire but since demolished
