= Elizabeth Trussell, Countess of Oxford =

English noblewoman (1496 – before July 1527)

Elizabeth Trussell
- Countess of Oxford
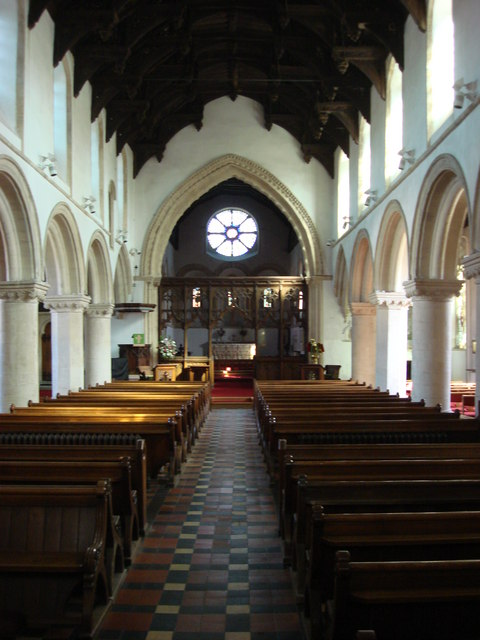
- Church of St Nicholas, burial place of Elizabeth Trussell, Countess of Oxford
- Born: 1496; Staffordshire England
- Died: 10 June 1527 (aged 30–31); Castle Hedingham, Essex, England
- Buried: Church of St Nicholas, Castle Hedingham, Essex
- Noble family: de Vere (by marriage)
- Spouse: John de Vere, 15th Earl of Oxford
- Issue: John de Vere, 16th Earl of Oxford; Aubrey de Vere; Robert de Vere; Geoffrey de Vere; Elizabeth de Vere; Anne de Vere; Frances de Vere
- Father: Edward Trussell
- Mother: Margaret Donne

Elizabeth de Vere (née Trussell), Countess of Oxford (1496 – before July 1527) was an English noblewoman. As a young child she became a royal ward.

She married John de Vere, 15th Earl of Oxford, and by him was mother of the 16th Earl and grandmother of Sir Francis and Sir Horace Vere, the 'fighting Veres'.

== Family ==
Elizabeth Trussell, born in 1496, was the daughter of Edward Trussell (c.1478 – 16 June 1499) of Elmesthorpe, Leicestershire, only son of Sir William Trussell (d. before 24 June 1480) of Elmesthorpe, Knight of the Body for King Edward IV, by Margaret Kene. The Trussells were a 'very ancient Warwickshire family'; Elizabeth's fourth great grandfather, Sir Warin Trussell, was of Billesley, Warwickshire.

Elizabeth Trussell's mother was Margaret Donne, the daughter of Sir John Donne (1450–1503) of Kidwelly, Carmarthenshire, and Elizabeth Hastings (c.1450 – 1508), daughter of Sir Leonard Hastings and Alice Camoys, and sister of William Hastings, 1st Baron Hastings. Sir John Donne's mother, Joan Scudamore, was the granddaughter of the Welsh rebel, Owain Glyndŵr.

Elizabeth had a brother, John Trussell (d.1499), to whom she was heir.

== Life ==
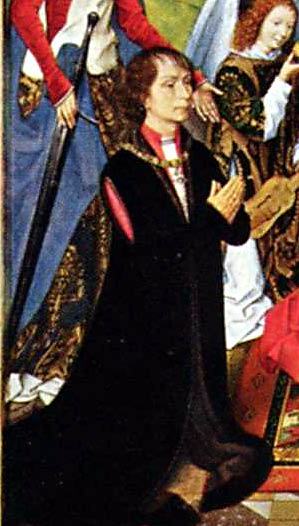
Elizabeth Trussell's grandfather, Sir John Donne, from the Don triptych by Hans Memling.

Elizabeth's father, Edward Trussell, had been a ward of William Hastings, 1st Baron Hastings, and at Hastings' death in 1483 was still a minor. In his will, Hastings expressed the wish that Trussell's wardship be purchased by Hastings' brother-in-law, Sir John Donne:

Also I will that mine executors give to my sister Dame Elizabeth Don 100 marks . . . Also where I have the ward and marriage of Edward Trussell, I will that it be sold and the money employed to the performing of this my will and for the weal of my soul; and if my brother Sir John Don will buy the said ward, I will that he be preferred therein before any other by £10.

After her father's death on 16 June 1499 and the death of her brother, John, in the same year, Elizabeth Trussell became a royal ward (Court of Wards and Liveries). Her wardship and marriage were initially purchased from King Henry VII by George Grey, 2nd Earl of Kent (d. 21 December 1503), who intended her as a bride for Sir Henry Grey (d. 24 September 1562), the 2nd Earl's son by his second marriage to Katherine Herbert, daughter of William Herbert, 1st Earl of Pembroke, by Anne Devereux, the daughter of Sir Walter Devereux. However, after the 2nd Earl's death, Richard Grey, 3rd Earl of Kent, the 2nd Earl's eldest son and heir by his first marriage to Anne Woodville, abducted Elizabeth Trussell, a crime for which the King levied a heavy fine against him:

Aged at least twenty-five when he succeeded his father in 1503, [the 3rd Earl] wasted his family's fortunes — possibly, as Dugdale says, he was a gambler. In a striking series of alienations he gave away or sold most of the lands, principally in Bedfordshire, that he had inherited . . . The earl also fell quickly into debt to the king: he failed to pay livery for his father's lands, and he was fined 2500 marks for abducting Elizabeth Trussell, whose wardship the second earl had left to Richard's half-brother Henry; he then failed to keep up the instalments laid down for the payment of the fine.

As a result of these events Elizabeth Trussell's wardship and marriage again came into the hands of the King, who sold it on 29 April 1507 to John de Vere, 13th Earl of Oxford, and his cousin John de Vere, later 15th Earl of Oxford, for an initial payment of 1000 marks and an additional £387 18s to be paid yearly, less £20 a year for Elizabeth's maintenance. The annual value of Elizabeth's lands had been estimated in the inquisition post mortem taken after her brother John's death at £271 12s 8d a year.

== Marriage and issue ==
Between 29 April 1507 and 4 July 1509 Elizabeth became the second wife of John de Vere, 15th Earl of Oxford, whose first wife was Christian Foderingey (born c. 1481, died before 4 November 1498), the daughter and co-heiress of Thomas Foderingey (c. 1446 – 1491) of Brockley, Suffolk, by Elizabeth Doreward (c. 1473 – 1491), daughter of William Doreward of Bocking, Essex, by whom the 15th Earl had no issue.

By her marriage to the 15th Earl of Oxford, Elizabeth had four sons and three daughters:

- John de Vere, 16th Earl of Oxford (1516 – 3 August 1562), who married firstly, Dorothy Neville (died c. 6 January 1548), second daughter of Ralph Neville, 4th Earl of Westmorland, by whom he had a daughter, Katherine de Vere, who married Edward Windsor, 3rd Baron Windsor. The Earl married secondly, Margery Golding (d. 2 December 1568), by whom he had a son, Edward de Vere, 17th Earl of Oxford, and a daughter, Mary de Vere.
- Aubrey de Vere (d. 1580), who married firstly Margaret Spring, the daughter of John Spring of Lavenham, by whom he had two children: Anne and Hugh. Aubrey de Vere married secondly, Bridget Gibbon, the daughter of Sir Anthony Gibbon of Lynn, Norfolk.
  - Anne de Vere (d.1617) married first Christopher Shernborne (d. 7 July 1575) with whom she had a son, Francis Shernborne, Esquire. Anne married second John Stubbs, whose right hand was cut off on 3 November 1579 for his authorship of The Discovery of a Gaping Gulf which criticised Queen Elizabeth's proposed marriage to Francois, Duke of Alençon.
  - Hugh Vere married Eleanor Walsh, the daughter of William Walsh. Hugh Vere and Eleanor Walsh had a son, Robert, who inherited the title as 19th Earl of Oxford.
- Robert de Vere (died c. 1598), who married firstly, Barbara Berners, by whom he had a son, John Vere, and a daughter, Mary Vere, and secondly, Joan Hubberd, sister of Edward Hubberd (d. 1602), by whom he had no issue.
- Geoffrey Vere (d. 1572), who in 1556 married Elizabeth Hardekyn (d. December 1615), daughter of Richard Hardekyn (d. 1558) of Wotton House near Castle Hedingham, by whom he had four sons, John Vere (c. 1558 – 1624) of Kirby Hall near Castle Hedingham, Sir Francis Vere (born c. 1560), Robert Vere (b. 1562), and Sir Horatio Vere (b. 1565), and a daughter, Frances Vere (born 1567), who married, as his second wife, the colonial adventurer and author, Sir Robert Harcourt (1574/5–1631), of Nuneham on 20 March 1598.
- Elizabeth de Vere (born c. 1512), who married, as his second wife, Thomas Darcy, 1st Baron Darcy of Chiche (d. 28 June 1558), by whom she had three sons, John Darcy, 2nd Baron Darcy of Chiche (d. 3 March 1581), Aubrey (d. 1558–68) and Robert (died c. 1568), and two daughters, Thomasine and Constance, of whom the latter married Edmund Pyrton (died c. 1609).
- Anne de Vere, (born c. 1522, died c. 14 February 1572), who married firstly, Edmund Sheffield, 1st Baron Sheffield of Butterwick, Lincolnshire, second but eldest surviving son of Sir Robert Sheffield by Margaret Zouche, by whom she had a son and three daughters. Edmund Sheffield was slain 31 July 1549 during the suppression of Kett's rebellion. Anne de Vere married secondly, John Brock, esquire, of Colchester, Essex, son and heir of John Brock of Little Leighs, Essex, by Agnes Wiseman, by whom she had no issue.
- Frances de Vere (c. 1517 – 30 June 1577), who married firstly, Henry Howard, Earl of Surrey, by whom she was the mother of Jane Howard, Thomas Howard, 4th Duke of Norfolk, Margaret Howard, Henry Howard, 1st Earl of Northampton, and Katherine Howard. Frances de Vere married secondly, Thomas Staynings, by whom she had no issue.

Elizabeth died before July 1527, and was buried in the Church of St Nicholas, Castle Hedingham, Essex, where her effigy can be seen on the black marble tomb erected for Elizabeth and her husband, the 15th Earl.
