= John de Vere, 15th Earl of Oxford =

English peer and courtier (c. 1482 – 1540)

John de Vere
- 15th Earl of Oxford
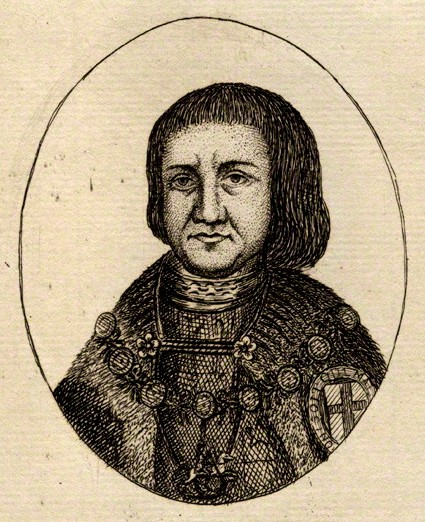
- John de Vere, 15th Earl of Oxford, engraving after funerary monument, National Portrait Gallery, London
- Born: c. 1482; Castle Hedingham, Essex
- Died: 21 March 1540 (aged 57–58); Wakes Colne, Essex
- Noble family: de Vere
- Spouses: Christian Foderingey; Elizabeth Trussell
- Issue: John de Vere, 16th Earl of Oxford; Aubrey Vere; Robert Vere; Geoffrey Vere; Elizabeth Vere; Frances Vere; Anne Vere
- Father: John de Vere
- Mother: Alice Kilrington

John de Vere, 15th Earl of Oxford

Lord Great Chamberlain
- In office 1526 – 21 Mar 1540
- Monarch: Henry VIII
- Preceded by: John de Vere, 14th Earl of Oxford
- Succeeded by: Thomas Cromwell

John de Vere, 15th Earl of Oxford, Lord Great Chamberlain KG PC (c. 1482 – 21 March 1540) was an English peer and courtier.

== Early life ==
John de Vere, born around 1482, was the son of John de Vere and Alice Kilrington (alias Colbroke), and the great-grandson of Richard de Vere, 11th Earl of Oxford, succeeding his second cousin, John de Vere, 14th Earl of Oxford, in the earldom. De Vere had two stepbrothers, William Courtenay and Walter Courtenay, and a stepsister, Katherine Courtenay, by his mother's second marriage, before 1491, to Sir Walter Courtenay (d. 7 November 1506), a younger son of Philip Courtenay of Powderham, Devon, by Elizabeth Hungerford.

== Career ==
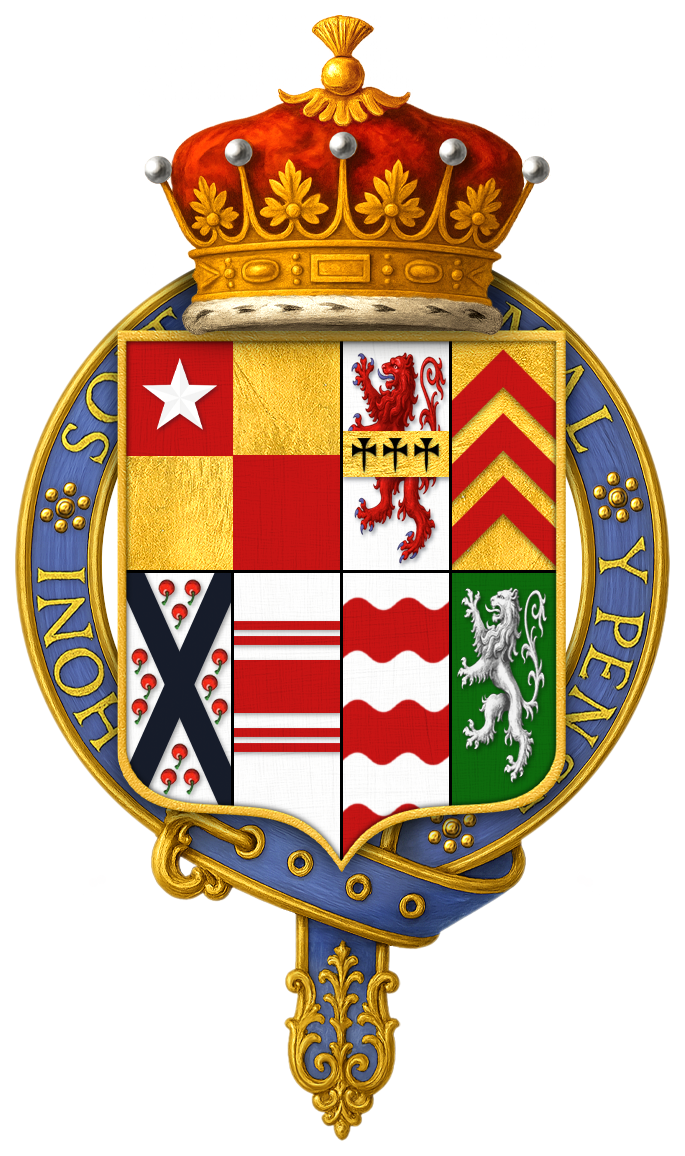
Arms of John de Vere, 15th Earl of Oxford, KG – Quarterly: 1) de Vere; 2) Kilrington; 3) de Clare; 4) Sergeaux: 5) Badlesmere; 6) Folliot; 7) Bolebec

De Vere was an Esquire of the Body at the funeral of Henry VII in 1509, and was knighted by Henry VIII 25 September 1513 at Tournai, following the Battle of the Spurs. He attended Henry VIII at the Field of the Cloth of Gold in 1520, and at his meeting with Charles V, Holy Roman Emperor, at Dover in 1522.

On 19 December 1526, Oxford was appointed Lord Great Chamberlain for life and was made a Knight of the Garter on 21 October 1527. He signed the Lords' petition against Cardinal Thomas Wolsey on 1 December 1529, and was appointed to the Privy Council before 22 March 1531.

In 1531 it was reported from Venice that Oxford was "a man of valour and authority ... and it is his custom always to cavalcade with two hundred horse".

Oxford bore the crown at Anne Boleyn's coronation in April 1533, but later served on the commission which tried the Queen on 15 May 1536. On 15 October 1537 he attended the christening of the future King Edward VI, and on 12 November following was present at the funeral of the queen, Jane Seymour.

On 2 and 3 December 1538 Oxford served on the panel of peers at the treason trials of the Marquess of Exeter, and Lord Montagu.

Oxford and his son, John, were in the King's retinue at the reception of Anne of Cleves at Blackheath.

De Vere was reputedly the first Protestant earl of Oxford. He patronised a company of players for which he commissioned John Bale to write plays from 1534 to 1536. As Lord Great Chamberlain and a favourite of Henry VIII, about 1537 he directed Bale to write anti-Catholic propaganda plays for Richard Morison's campaign against the Pope.

Oxford died on 21 March 1540 at his manor of Colne, Essex, and was buried on 12 April at Castle Hedingham.

== Marriages and issue ==
Oxford's first wife was Christian Foderingey (b. circa 1481, d. before 4 November 1498), daughter of Thomas Foderingey (circa 1446–1491) of Brockley, Suffolk, by Elizabeth Doreward (c. 1473–1491), daughter of William Doreward of Doreward’s Hall in Bocking, Essex. The couple had no children.

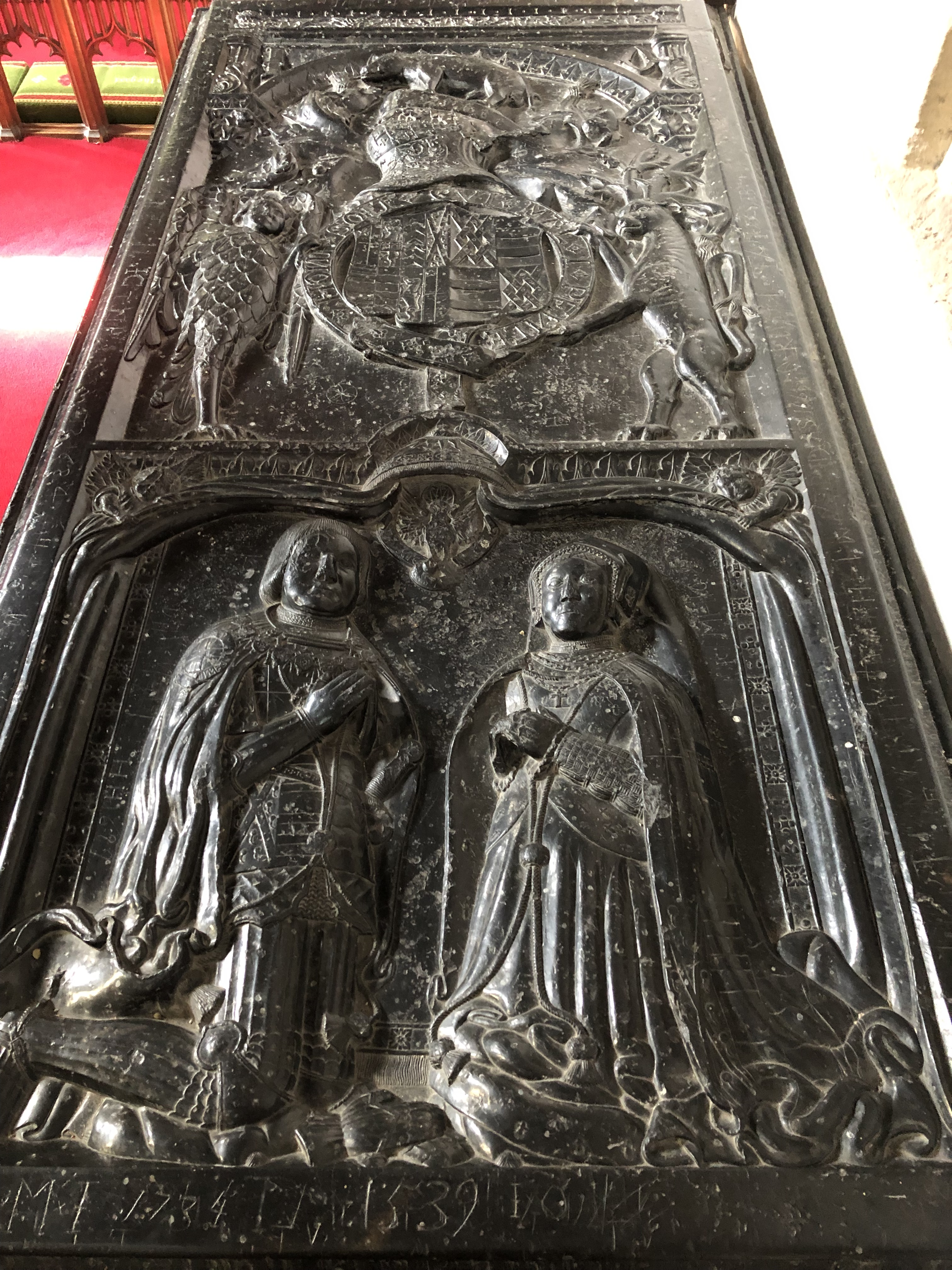
Funerary Monument of John De Vere, 15th Earl of Oxford in St Nicholas Church, Castle Hedingham, Essex

Oxford's second wife was Elizabeth Trussell, daughter of Edward Trussell (c. 1478 – 16 June 1499) of Kibblestone (Cublesdon), Staffordshire, and Margaret Donne, the daughter of John Donne of Kidwelly(d. 1503) by Elizabeth Hastings (d. 1508). They had four sons and three daughters.

1. Elizabeth de Vere (b. c. 1512) married Thomas Darcy, 1st Baron Darcy of Chiche (d. 28 June 1558), and had children.
2. John de Vere, 16th Earl of Oxford (1516 – 3 August 1562) married first Dorothy Neville, daughter of Ralph Neville, 4th Earl of Westmorland, and married second Margery Golding. He had issue with both wives.
3. Frances de Vere (c. 1517 – 30 Jun 1577) married first Henry Howard, Earl of Surrey, with whom she had a son, Thomas Howard, fourth Duke of Norfolk; she married second Thomas Stainings.
4. Aubrey de Vere married Margaret Spring, the daughter of John Spring; their grandson, Robert de Vere, became nineteenth Earl of Oxford. Their daughter, Anne de Vere (d. 1617), married first Christopher Shernborne (d. 7 July 1575) with whom she had a son, Francis Shernborne. Anne married second John Stubbs, whose right hand was cut off on 3 November 1579 for his authorship of The Discovery of a Gaping Gulf which criticized Queen Elizabeth I's proposed marriage to Francois, Duke of Alençon.
5. Robert de Vere (b. circa 1520 – 28 April 1598) was lord of the manor of Wricklemarsh and buried at Charlton, St Lukes, Kent.
6. Anne de Vere, (b. circa 1522, d. c. 14 February 1572) married first Edmund Sheffield, 1st Baron Sheffield (d. 31 July 1549) of Butterwick, Lincolnshire; she married second John Brock of Colchester, Essex.
7. Geoffrey de Vere (b. circa 1523) married Elizabeth Hardkyn, daughter of John Hardkyn.

== Notes ==
Peerage of England
Preceded by John de Vere	Earl of Oxford; 1526–1539	Succeeded by John de Vere
