= Robert Bertie, 1st Earl of Lindsey =

English military officer and courtier

The Right Honourable The Earl of Lindsey KG
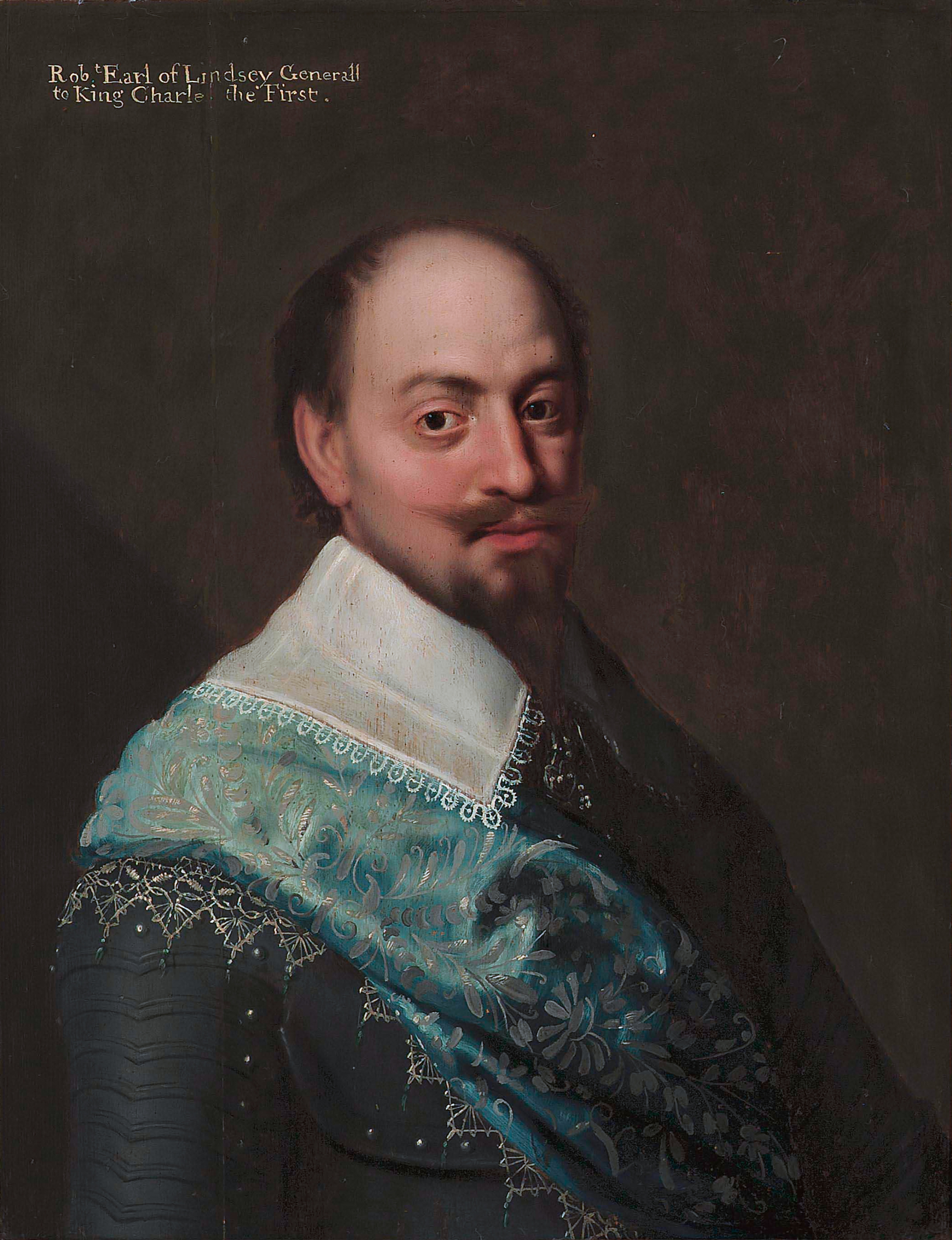
- Portrait by the circle of Michiel Jansz. van Mierevelt

Lord-Lieutenant of Lincolnshire
- In office 1629–1642

Lord Great Chamberlain
- In office 1626–1642

Personal details
- Born: 16 December 1582 London, England
- Died: 24 October 1642 (aged 59) Warwick Castle, Warwickshire
- Resting place: Edenham, Lincolnshire
- Spouse: Elizabeth Montagu (1604-his death)
- Children: Montagu Bertie, 2nd Earl of Lindsey
- Parent(s): Peregrine Bertie, 13th Baron Willoughby de Eresby, Mary de Vere
- Education: Corpus Christi College, Cambridge
- Occupation: Professional soldier and diplomat

Military service
- Battles/wars: Eighty Years War; Battle of Nieuwpoort; Siege of Breda (1624); Anglo-French War (1627–1629); Siege of Saint-Martin-de-Ré; Siege of La Rochelle; War of the Three Kingdoms; Battle of Edgehill (WIA)

Robert Bertie, 1st Earl of Lindsey (16 December 1582 – 24 October 1642) was an English military officer and courtier.

== Personal details ==
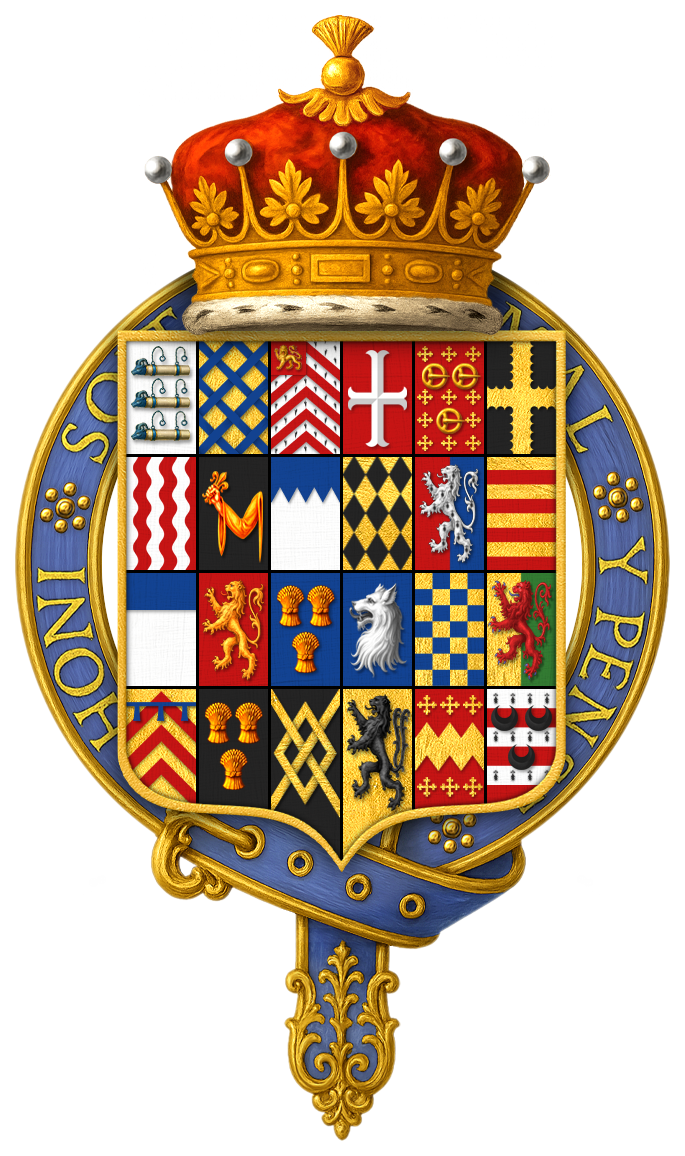
Quartered arms of Sir Robert Bertie, 1st Earl of Lindsey, KG

Robert Bertie was the son of Peregrine Bertie, 13th Baron Willoughby de Eresby (b. 12 October 1555 – d. 25 June 1601) and Mary de Vere, daughter of John de Vere, 16th Earl of Oxford, and Margery Golding. Queen Elizabeth I was his godmother, and two of her favourite earls (Robert Dudley, 1st Earl of Leicester, and Robert Devereux, 2nd Earl of Essex), whose Christian name he bore, were his godfathers.

== Career ==
The long Continental wars throughout the peaceful reign of King James I had been treated by the English nobility as schools of arms, as a few campaigns were considered a graceful finish to a gentleman's education.

He succeeded his father as Baron Willoughby de Eresby in 1601. Noted as "lord Willobie", he performed in The Coleorton Masque in February 1618. He was later created Earl of Lindsey on 22 November 1626 and took his title from the northern of the three parts of Lincolnshire, the old Kingdom of Lindsey.

== Kalmar War ==
In February 1612, at the request of a Danish ambassador Jonas Charisius, there were plans to raise an army under Robert Bertie and Sir Edward Cecil to fight against Sweden in the Kalmar War. Richard Preston would command a regiment of Scottish troops and Irish troops would be led by the Earl of Clanrickard. It was said that the ambassador's cause was advocated by Anne of Denmark and, as the conditions offered were poor, he would have to press men and mariners. Willoughby sold land to raise funds. He was allowed to levy men by sound of drum in London. Willoughby's force went to Denmark but arrived after a truce was arranged by James Spens and Robert Anstruther.

== The entrepreneur ==
The Lindsey Level in The Fens, between the River Glen and The Haven, at Boston, Lincolnshire, was named after the first Earl Lindsey as he was the principal adventurer in its drainage. The drainage work was declared complete in 1638 but the project was neglected with the onset of the Civil War so that the land fell back into its old state. When it was drained again, more than a hundred years later, it was called the Black Sluice Level. There is more information under the article Twenty, Lincolnshire.

== The English Civil War ==
As soon as Lord Lindsey had begun to fear that the disputes between the King, Charles I and Parliament must end in war, he had begun to exercise and train his tenantry in Lincolnshire and Northamptonshire, of whom he had formed a regiment of infantry.

=== First Siege of Hull ===
Lord Lindsey accompanied the King in April 1642 as part of a party who tried to negotiate a handover of the magazine at Hull for the King's military use. This handover was turned down by the pro-Parliamentary governor, Sir John Hotham, who expelled the party, causing it to withdraw with the King to York. Early in July, the King returned from York with a force of 3,000 infantry and 1,000 cavalry, intent on besieging the city, now garrisoned by reinforcing Parliamentary troops commanded by Sir John Meldrum, returning to York while leaving Lord Lindsey in command through the siege. Meldrum ordered some effective sorties out of the city, the last of which, on 27 July, blew up the arsenal Lindsey's troops had set up at Anlaby, west of Hull. Lindsey's force, whose cavalry were unsupported by the infantry who had withdrawn to Beverley, gave up the siege after this loss of their munitions and retreated back to York, lifting the siege.

=== Battle of Edgehill ===
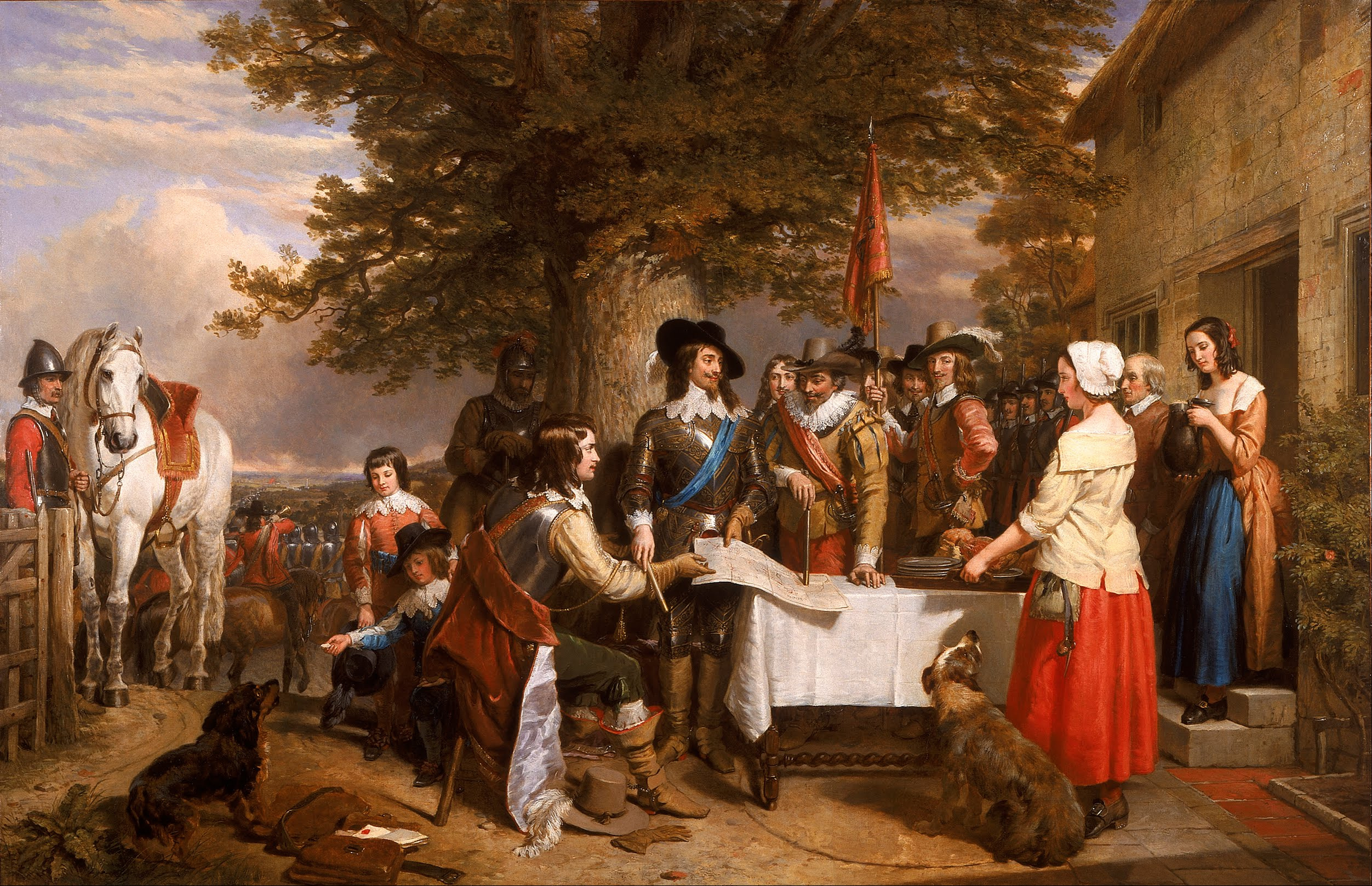
The Eve of the Battle of Edgehill by Charles Landseer, 1845. Lindsey is shown standing beside Charles I

As Lord Lindsey was a most experienced soldier of 59 years of age at the start of the English Civil War, King Charles I had appointed him General-in-chief of the Royalists for the Battle of Edgehill. However, the King had imprudently exempted the cavalry from Lindsey's command, its general, the King's nephew Prince Rupert of the Rhine, taking orders only from the King. Rupert was only 22 years old, and although an experienced soldier who had fought in the Thirty Years' War, he had not yet learnt that cavalry should also be used in support of infantry and not just against the enemy's cavalry.

With Lindsey was his son Montagu Bertie, Lord Willoughby who had seen some service against the Spaniards in the Netherlands, and after his return had been made a captain in the Lifeguards, and a Gentleman of the Bedchamber. Anthony van Dyck has left portraits of the father and the son; the one a bald-headed, alert, precise-looking old warrior, with the cuirass and gauntlets of earlier warfare; the other, the very model of a cavalier, tall, easy, and graceful, with a gentle reflective face, and wearing the long lovelocks and deep-point lace collar and cuffs characteristic of Queen Henrietta's Court.

At eight o'clock, on the morning of 23 October 1642 King Charles was riding along the ridge of Edge Hill, and looking down into the Vale of the Red Horse, a fair meadow land, here and there broken by hedges and copses. His troops were mustering around him, and in the valley he could see with his telescope the various Parliamentary regiments, as they poured out of the town of Kineton, and took up their positions in three lines. "I never saw the rebels in a body before," he said, as he gazed sadly at the subjects arrayed against him. "I shall give them battle. God, and the prayers of good men to Him, assist the justice of my cause." The whole of his forces were not assembled till two o'clock in the afternoon, for the gentlemen who had become officers found it no easy matter to call their farmers and retainers together, and marshal them into any sort of order.

Lord Lindsey, who was an old comrade of Robert Devereux, 3rd Earl of Essex, who was by then the commander of the Parliamentarian forces, knew that he would follow the tactics they had both together studied in Holland, little thinking that one day they should be arrayed one against the other in their own native England. He had a high opinion of Essex's generalship, and insisted that the situation of the Royal army required the utmost caution. Rupert, on the other hand, had seen the swift fiery charges of the fierce troopers of the Thirty Years' War, and was backed up by Patrick Ruthven, Lord Ruthven, one of the many Scots who had won honour under King Gustavus Adolphus of Sweden. A sudden charge of the Royal horse would, Rupert argued, sweep the Roundheads from the field, and the foot would have nothing to do but to follow up the victory. The King, sad enough at having to fight at all with his subjects, and never having seen a battle, seemed entirely bewildered between the ardent words of his spirited nephew and the grave replies of the well-seasoned old Earl. Eventually the King, willing at least not to irritate Rupert, desired that Ruthven should array the troops in the Swedish fashion.

It was a greater affront to the General-in-chief than the king was likely to understand, but it could not shake the old soldier's loyalty. He gravely resigned the empty title of General, which only made confusion worse confounded, and rode away to act as colonel of his own Lincolnshire regiment, pitying his master's perplexity, and resolved that no private pique should hinder him from doing his duty. His regiment was of foot soldiers, and was just opposite to the standard of the Earl of Essex.

In the afternoon the Royal forces marched down the hill. Prince Rupert's charge was fully successful. No one even waited to cross swords with his troopers, but all the Roundhead horse galloped headlong off the field, hotly pursued by the Royalists. However, the main body of the army stood firm, and for some time the battle was nearly equal, until a large troop of Parliamentary cavalry who had been kept in reserve, wheeled round and fell upon the Royal forces just when their scanty supply of ammunition was exhausted. Step by step, however, they retreated bravely, and Rupert, who had returned from his charge, sought in vain to collect his scattered troopers, so as to fall again on the Roundheads. Some were plundering, some chasing the Roundheads, and none could be got together.

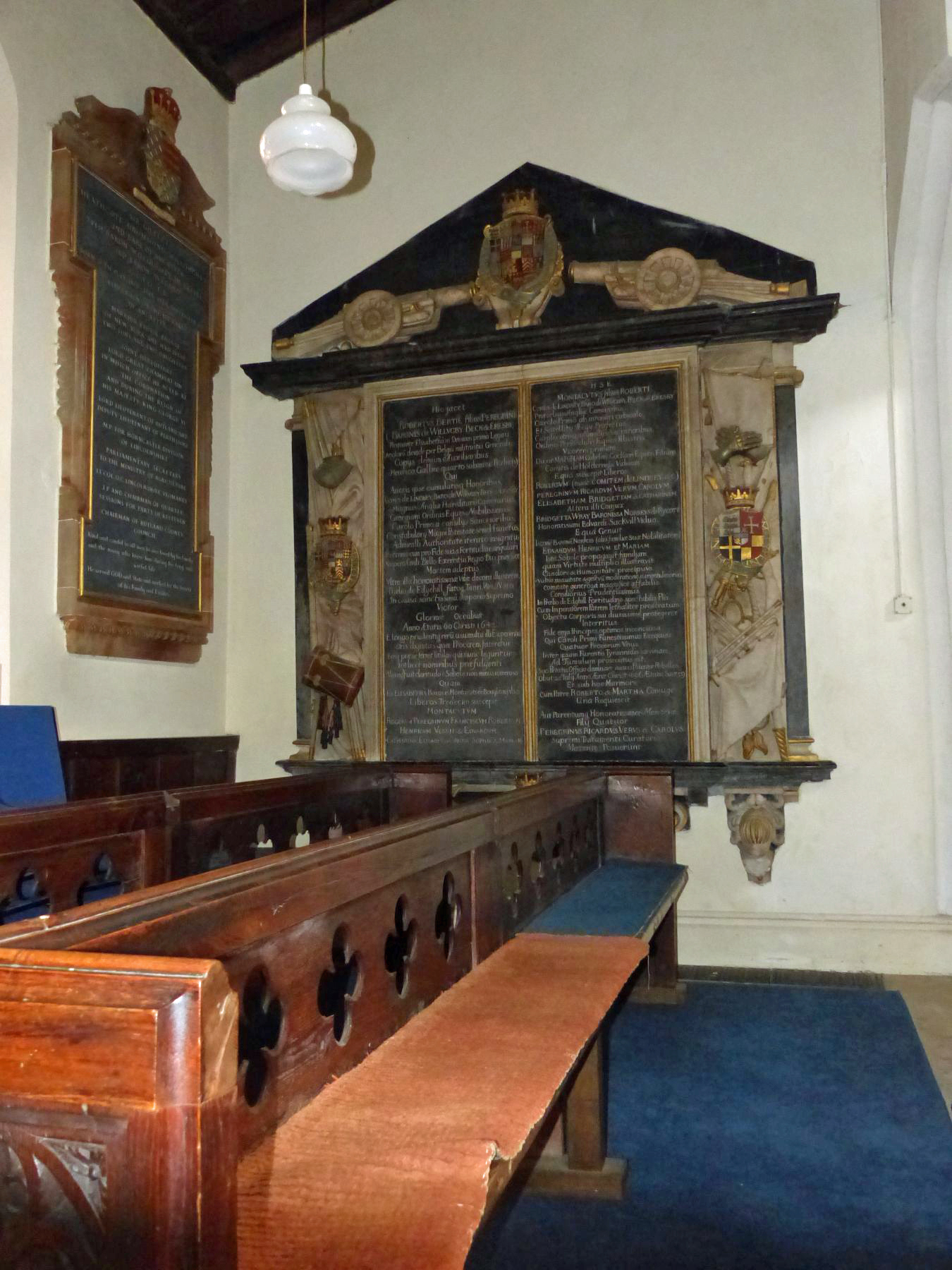
Memorial to Lord Lindsey and his son Montague in the Church of St Michael and All Angels, Edenham, Lincolnshire

=== Death ===
Lord Lindsey was shot through the thigh bone, and fell. He was instantly surrounded by Roundhead cavalry; but his son, Lord Willoughby, seeing his danger, flung himself alone among them, forced his way forward, and raised his father in his arm, unheeding his own safety. The throng of Roundheads around called to him to surrender, and, hastily giving up his sword, he carried the Earl into the nearest shed, and laid him on a heap of straw, vainly striving to staunch the blood under watch of a Roundhead guard.

It was a bitterly cold night, and the frosty wind came howling through the darkness. Lord Lindsey himself murmured, "If it please God I should survive, I never will fight in the same field with boys again!"–no doubt deeming that young Rupert had wrought all the mischief. His thoughts were all on the cause, his son's all on him. It proved impossible to stop his wounds bleeding and gradually the old man's strength ebbed away.

Toward midnight the Earl's old comrade Essex had news of his condition, and sent some officers to enquire for him, and promise speedy surgical attendance. Lindsey was still full of spirit, and spoke to them so strongly of their broken faith, and of the sin of disloyalty and rebellion, that they slunk away one by one out of the hut, and dissuaded Essex from coming himself to see his old friend, as he had intended. The surgeon, however, arrived, but too late, Lindsey was already so much exhausted by cold and loss of blood, that he died early in the morning of 24 October 1642, as he was being carried through the gates of Warwick Castle where other Royalist prisoners were being kept. His son, despite King Charles' best efforts to obtain his exchange, remained a prisoner of the Parliamentary side for about a year. Lindsey is buried in St Michael and All Angels Church, Edenham, Lincolnshire.

Lord Lindsey should not be confused with Ludovic Lindsay, 16th Earl of Crawford, who also fought for the King at the Battle of Edgehill.

== Marriage and issue ==
In 1605, Lindsey married Elizabeth Montagu (d. 30 November 1654, daughter of Edward Montagu, 1st Baron Montagu of Boughton). They had thirteen children:

- Montagu Bertie, 2nd Earl of Lindsey (1608–1666)
- Hon. Sir Roger Bertie (d. 15 October 1654), married Ursula Lawley, daughter of Sir Edward Lawley
- Hon. Robert Bertie (1 January 1619 – 1708), married firstly Alice Barnard, secondly Elizabeth Bennet, and thirdly Mary Halsey
- Hon. Sir Peregrine Bertie, married Anne Hardeby
- Capt. Hon. Francis Bertie (d. 1641), killed in Ireland
- Capt. Hon. Henry Bertie (d. 1643), killed at the First Battle of Newbury
- Hon. Vere Bertie, died unmarried
- Hon. Edward Bertie (17 October 1624 – 25 December 1686)
- Lady Katherine Bertie, married about 1631 Sir William Paston, 1st Baronet, one son, Robert Paston, 1st Earl of Yarmouth
- Lady Elizabeth Bertie (d. 28 February 1684), married in 1661 Sir Miles Stapleton
- Lady Anne Bertie (d. 1660), died unmarried
- Lady Mary Bertie, married firstly Rev. John Hewett (d. 1658), and secondly Sir Abraham Shipman
- Lady Sophia Bertie, married Sir Richard Chaworth

The office of Lord Great Chamberlain descended through to him following the death of his cousin Henry de Vere, 18th Earl of Oxford, as being the closest heir male.

== Notes ==
Political offices
Preceded by The Earl of Oxford	Lord Great Chamberlain; 1625–1642	Succeeded by The Earl of Lindsey
Peerage of England
New creation	Earl of Lindsey; 1626–1642	Succeeded by Montagu Bertie
Preceded by Peregrine Bertie	Baron Willoughby de Eresby (descended by acceleration); 1601–1640	Succeeded by Montagu Bertie
