= Jonas Charisius =

Danish physician, politician and ambassador

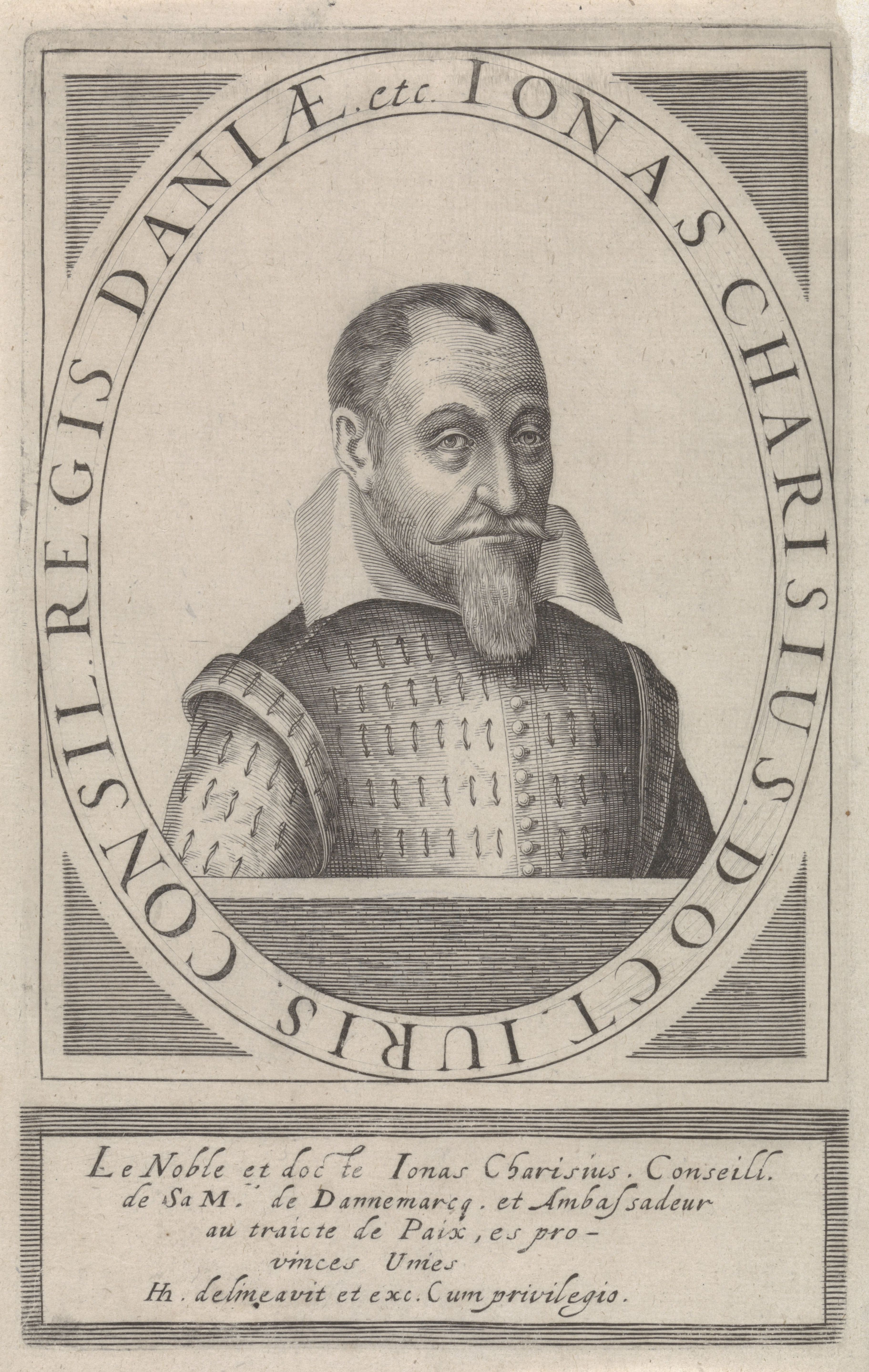
Jonas Charisius

Jonas Charisius or Carisius (1571-1619) was a Danish physician, politician, and ambassador.

== Background ==
He studied medicine at Padua and Heidelberg and obtained a doctorate, before embarking on a political career in 1598.

In April 1599 Charisius was included as a physician in Christian IV's voyage to the north of Norway, Nordkapp (Bjørnøya), and towards Russia. After this, he served Christian IV primarily as a diplomat.

== Career diplomat ==
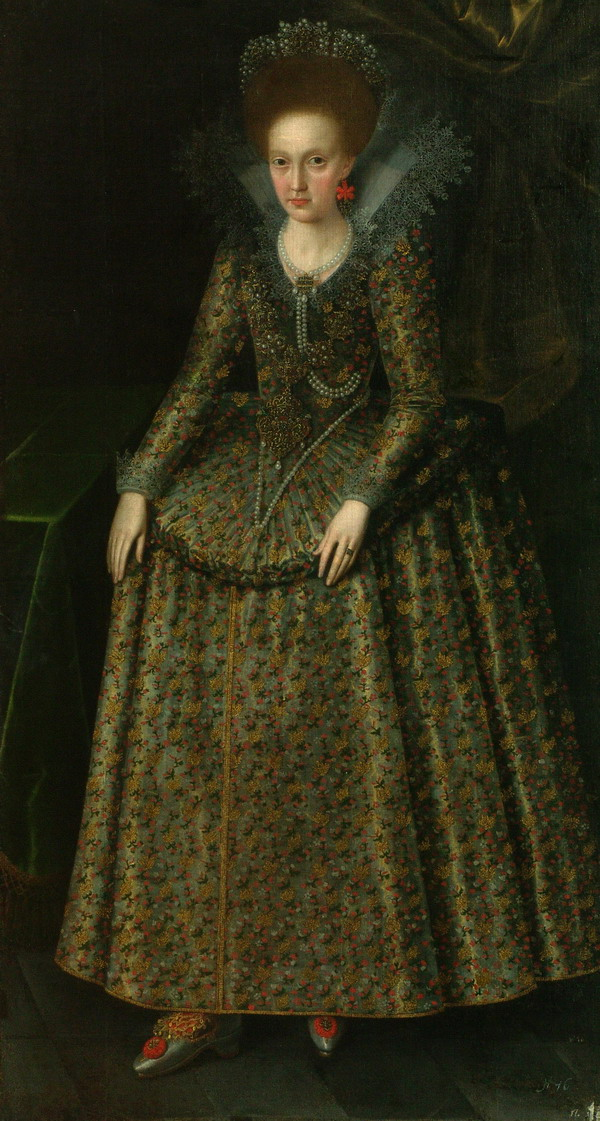
Charisius worked to build support for the marriage of the niece of Christian IV, Princess Elizabeth

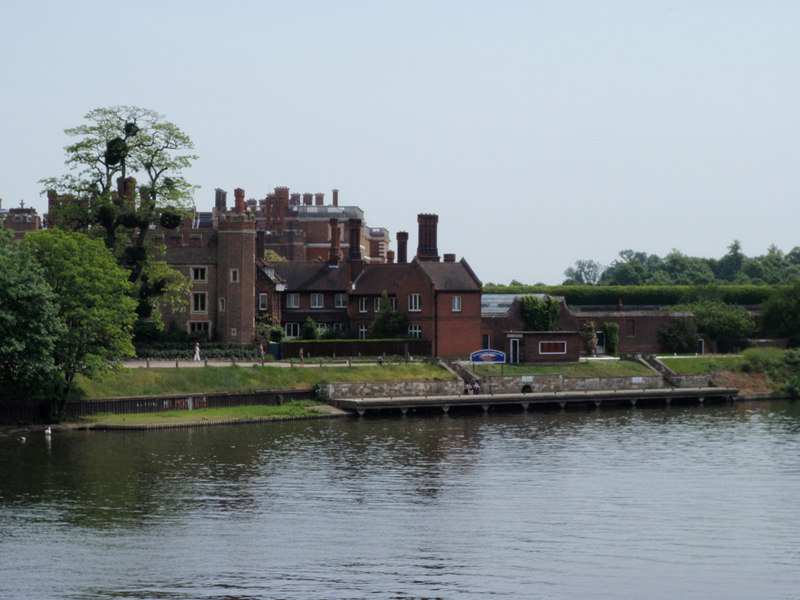
Charisius obtained privileged access to James VI and I at Hampton Court

Charisius was involved in a diplomatic discussion at Bremen in 1602, where English shipping, fishing issues, and access to the Sound toll were discussed. The other Danish negotiators were Manderup Parsberg and Arnold Witfield (Arild Huitfeldt). One of the English diplomats, Stephen Lesieur sent a portrait of Elizabeth I to Christian IV of Denmark. A meeting to discuss the same issues scheduled at Emden in April 1600 had been abandoned after the English envoys failed to turn up. In February 1603, Alexander Covert and a merchant Richard Lewis, representing the Eastland Company, were sent to Denmark for a follow-up meeting about the passage of English ships through the Sound with Charisius and the others.

Charisius arrived in London in November 1610 and was lodged with Paul Fourry. He received a diplomatic gift of a gold chain. The Danish party included a tailor, 10 musicians, 15 trumpeters, and a drummer.

He returned to London in August 1611 with news of the storming of Kristianopel and the Kalmar War, seeking military aid. He visited Sir Robert Cecil and Anne of Denmark, the wife of James VI and I, who was at Oatlands. James was reluctant to meet him while he was on progress, but Carisius got an audience at Beaulieu in Hampshire.

Amongst other matters, Charisius told King James that Christian IV recommended and supported the planned marriage of his daughter Princess Elizabeth (1596-1662) to Frederick V of the Palatinate (1596-1632). James told one of his Scottish courtiers, Viscount Fenton, to send this news to Sir Robert Cecil. The Duke of Bouillon had already proposed this marriage. James was pleased with the idea that Christian IV would now "deal in that business" and wanted Cecil to speak about the plans with "Doctor Jonas". The wedding took place on 14 February 1613. Anne of Denmark seems not to have been keen on this marriage for her daughter.

Charisius returned to London. On 11 September, King James sent him a stag that he killed while hunting at Wanstead. The Venetian ambassador in London, Antonio Foscarini, noted in October 1611 that Charisius was successful in his mission, due in part to the influence of Anne of Denmark, who was able to secure private audiences with the king for Danish diplomats, in this case at Hampton Court.

Charisius returned to London in January 1612, asking for military support. He told Foscarini that Christian IV intended to support the weaker faction in Sweden in the conflict between Gustavus Adolphus and John II Casimir Vasa, in order to further his own territorial interests and ambitions, which included establishing the Danish crown as a hereditary monarchy and joining the Holy Roman Empire. King James allowed him to have 100 small cannons, and subsequently sent Lord Willoughby and troops to Denmark. Christian IV commissioned Willoughby to raise a company of 1,500 foot soldiers, as Colonel-General of his English forces. Recruits included William Cromwell, a son of Oliver Cromwell of Hinchingbooke. Willoughby's force went to Denmark but arrived after a truce was arranged by James Spens and Robert Anstruther.

Charisius spent three months in Germany in 1618 and returned to Denmark via The Hague in November. Dudley Carleton heard that Christian IV hoped Danish ships would not molested by the Dutch Republic or Dutch East India Company in the East Indies. Charisius had been asked to recruit ship's officers in the Netherlands to serve in the new Danish East India Company.

He came to London in 1619 via The Hague, where he left letters for the Dutch Republic, one concerning the East Indies trade. In London he lodged with Paul Fourrey again. Following the death of Anne of Denmark, another Danish diplomat, Andrew Sinclair, joined him on 2 April 1619. They wrote to the Marquess of Buckingham asking him to obtain an audience with King James for them.

Charisius bought paintings and musical instruments for Christian IV in the Netherlands, and in 1619 sent him portraits of King James and the late Anne of Denmark. Charisius promoted the career of the artist Pieter Isaacsz, a former pupil of Hans von Aachen, who returned to Denmark to become a court painter in 1614.

On one occasion, Charisius left London without receiving a customary diplomatic gift from King James. Robert Anstruther wrote to him that he had arranged for a gold chain to be given to Andrew Sinclair for him.

In 1602, Charisius married Anna, a daughter of the physician Petrus Severinus or Peder Soerensen (died 1602). Their son Peder Charisius also became a diplomat.

He died in Denmark in November 1619.
