= Listed buildings in Hartest =

Civil Parish in Suffolk, England

Hartest is a village and civil parish in the Babergh District of Suffolk, England. It contains 52 listed buildings that are recorded in the National Heritage List for England. Of these one is grade I and 51 are grade II.

This list is based on the information retrieved online from Historic England.

== Key ==
Grade	Criteria
I	Buildings that are of exceptional interest
II*	Particularly important buildings of more than special interest
II	Buildings that are of special interest

== Listing ==
Name	Grade	Location	Type	Completed (Note: The date given is the date used by Historic England as significant for the initial building or that of an important part in the structure's description.)	Date designated	Grid ref. (Note: The grid reference is based on the British national grid reference system, sometimes known as OSGB36, used by the Ordnance Survey.) Geo-coordinates	Notes	Entry number (Note: The "List Entry Number" is a unique number assigned to each listed building and scheduled monument by Historic England.)	Image	Wikidata
Elizals Cottage	II				9 February 1978	TL8388052012; 52°08′09″N 0°41′07″E		1351778	Upload Photo	Q26634848
Burnthouse Farmhouse	II	Bury Road			9 February 1978	TL8288153523; 52°08′59″N 0°40′18″E		1351774	Upload Photo	Q26634845
Hartest Place	II	Bury Road			10 January 1953	TL8303853236; 52°08′49″N 0°40′25″E		1351773	Upload Photo	Q26634844
Northend Cottages	II	Bury Road			9 February 1978	TL8301053316; 52°08′52″N 0°40′24″E		1036607	Upload Photo	Q26288289
Stowehill	II	Bury Road			9 February 1978	TL8296353745; 52°09′06″N 0°40′23″E		1036608	Upload Photo	Q26288292
Candlers	II	Cross Green			9 February 1978	TL8321153023; 52°08′42″N 0°40′34″E		1285177	Upload Photo	Q26573891
The Thatched Cottage	II	Cross Green			9 February 1978	TL8318453035; 52°08′43″N 0°40′33″E		1351775	Upload Photo	Q26634846
K6 Telephone Kiosk	II	Hartest Green			1 September 1987	TL8341352526; 52°08′26″N 0°40′44″E		1233326	Upload Photo	Q26526801
Baynton's Farmhouse	II	Hartest Hill			23 March 1961	TL8357252385; 52°08′21″N 0°40′52″E		1181244	Upload Photo	Q26476576
Bridge House	II	Hartest Hill			9 February 1978	TL8351352397; 52°08′22″N 0°40′49″E		1036620	Upload Photo	Q26288305
Cawston's Farmhouse	II	Hartest Hill			9 February 1978	TL8410351929; 52°08′06″N 0°41′19″E		1036622	Upload Photo	Q26288307
Fosters Farmhouse	II	Hartest Hill			9 February 1978	TL8402651865; 52°08′04″N 0°41′15″E		1181276	Upload Photo	Q26476603
Pippin Cottage	II	Hartest Hill			9 February 1978	TL8381552071; 52°08′11″N 0°41′04″E		1036621	Upload Photo	Q26288306
Cooks Farmhouse	II	Lawshall Road			9 February 1978	TL8387452920; 52°08′38″N 0°41′09″E		1351779	Upload Photo	Q26634849
Kew Gardens Farmhouse	II	Lawshall Road			5 August 1998	TL8416053794; 52°09′06″N 0°41′26″E		1376000	Upload Photo	Q26656688
Brookside	II	Melford Road			9 February 1978	TL8323652182; 52°08′15″N 0°40′34″E		1351800	Upload Photo	Q26634870
Dowsetts	II	Melford Road			9 February 1978	TL8286651749; 52°08′02″N 0°40′14″E		1036623	Upload Photo	Q26288308
Hatch Cottage	II	Pilgrims Lane			9 February 1978	TL8333053085; 52°08′44″N 0°40′41″E		1036580	Upload Photo	Q26288263
The Chestnuts	II	Pilgrims Lane			10 January 1953	TL8332653229; 52°08′49″N 0°40′41″E		1351799	Upload Photo	Q26634869
Hartest War Memorial	II	Shimpling Road, IP29 4DH	war memorial		7 March 2018	TL8336352485; 52°08′25″N 0°40′41″E		1454121	Hartest War Memorial More images	Q66479459
Pompes	II	Shimpling Road, Bury St Edmunds, IP29 4ET, Hartest Hill			9 February 1978	TL8381352057; 52°08′10″N 0°41′04″E		1181252	Upload Photo	Q26476583
Hop Hall	II	Somerton Road			9 February 1978	TL8322852525; 52°08′26″N 0°40′34″E		1351802	Upload Photo	Q26634872
Millhill Farmhouse	II	Somerton Road			9 February 1978	TL8267652446; 52°08′24″N 0°40′05″E		1036585	Upload Photo	Q26288268
Appleby Cottage	II	The Green, Bury St Edmunds, IP29 4DH			9 February 1978	TL8346052446; 52°08′23″N 0°40′46″E		1036609	Upload Photo	Q26288293
Boshula and Peartree Cottage	II	The Green			9 February 1978	TL8338852428; 52°08′23″N 0°40′42″E		1036616	Upload Photo	Q26288300
Brook House	II	The Green, Bury St Edmunds, IP29 4DH			9 February 1978	TL8338752583; 52°08′28″N 0°40′43″E		1036615	Upload Photo	Q26288299
Chapel House	II	The Green			9 February 1978	TL8341452543; 52°08′27″N 0°40′44″E		1181179	Upload Photo	Q26476516
Church of All Saints	I	The Green	church building		23 March 1961	TL8346952388; 52°08′22″N 0°40′46″E		1351776	Church of All Saints More images	Q17542556
Congregational Chapel	II	The Green			9 February 1978	TL8340752553; 52°08′27″N 0°40′44″E		1036614	Upload Photo	Q26288298
Crown Inn	II	The Green	inn		10 January 1953	TL8339852378; 52°08′21″N 0°40′43″E		1285108	Crown Inn More images	Q26573824
Derwins Cottage and House Adjoining on the West	II	The Green			9 February 1978	TL8335152434; 52°08′23″N 0°40′40″E		1036617	Upload Photo	Q26288302
Green Farmhouse	II	The Green			10 January 1953	TL8343452523; 52°08′26″N 0°40′45″E		1036612	Upload Photo	Q26288296
House and Shop Adjoining Green Farmhouse on the North	II	The Green			10 January 1953	TL8342852528; 52°08′26″N 0°40′45″E		1285134	Upload Photo	Q26573849
Isbury	II	The Green			9 February 1978	TL8338052592; 52°08′28″N 0°40′42″E		1285103	Upload Photo	Q26573820
Old Bakery	II	The Green			9 February 1978	TL8344052510; 52°08′26″N 0°40′45″E		1036611	Upload Photo	Q26288295
Place Farmhouse	II	The Green			23 March 1961	TL8331852603; 52°08′29″N 0°40′39″E		1181228	Upload Photo	Q26476562
Rectory	II	The Green			9 February 1978	TL8345952337; 52°08′20″N 0°40′46″E		1036618	Upload Photo	Q26288303
Stables to Rectory	II	The Green			9 February 1978	TL8347652354; 52°08′20″N 0°40′47″E		1285116	Upload Photo	Q26573831
Sturgeons Hall	II	The Green, Bury St Edmunds, IP29 4DH			9 February 1978	TL8334152515; 52°08′26″N 0°40′40″E		1036619	Upload Photo	Q26288304
The Hunters	II	The Green			10 January 1953	TL8342252534; 52°08′26″N 0°40′44″E		1036613	Upload Photo	Q26288297
The Limes	II	The Green			9 February 1978	TL8346152483; 52°08′25″N 0°40′46″E		1285131	Upload Photo	Q26573846
Wheelwrights	II	The Green, Bury St Edmunds, IP29 4DH			9 February 1978	TL8346052459; 52°08′24″N 0°40′46″E		1036610	Upload Photo	Q26288294
White Cottage	II	The Green			9 February 1978	TL8334952537; 52°08′26″N 0°40′40″E		1351777	Upload Photo	Q26634847
Barham Cottage	II	The Row			6 April 1993	TL8322652165; 52°08′15″N 0°40′33″E		1276410	Upload Photo	Q26565925
Gladwin and Thatched Cottage	II	The Row			17 October 1975	TL8322052074; 52°08′12″N 0°40′33″E		1036584	Upload Photo	Q26288267
Potash Cottage	II	The Row			9 February 1978	TL8332452385; 52°08′22″N 0°40′39″E		1036581	Upload Photo	Q26288264
The Old Stores and Tebbit	II	The Row, IP29 4DJ			9 February 1978	TL8321752135; 52°08′14″N 0°40′33″E		1036582	Upload Photo	Q26288265
Whitecroft	II	The Row			17 October 1975	TL8321652096; 52°08′12″N 0°40′33″E		1351801	Upload Photo	Q26634871
Windfall Cottage and Adjoining Cottage	II	The Row			17 October 1975	TL8322052106; 52°08′13″N 0°40′33″E		1036583	Upload Photo	Q26288266
Orchard Cottage	II	Workhouse Hill			9 February 1978	TL8326452877; 52°08′38″N 0°40′37″E		1181373	Upload Photo	Q26476696
Poorhouse Cottages	II	Workhouse Hill			9 February 1978	TL8321552972; 52°08′41″N 0°40′34″E		1036586	Upload Photo	Q26288270
Weast View and High View	II	Workhouse Hill			9 February 1978	TL8323552988; 52°08′41″N 0°40′35″E		1351803	Upload Photo	Q26634873

== See also ==
- Grade I listed buildings in Suffolk
- Grade II* listed buildings in Suffolk

== Sources ==
- Bettely, James; Pevsner, Nikolaus (2015) [1961], Suffolk: West, The Buildings of England, New Haven and London: Yale University Press, ISBN 978-0-300-19655-9
