= Peregrine Bertie, 13th Baron Willoughby de Eresby =

English nobleman (1555–1601)

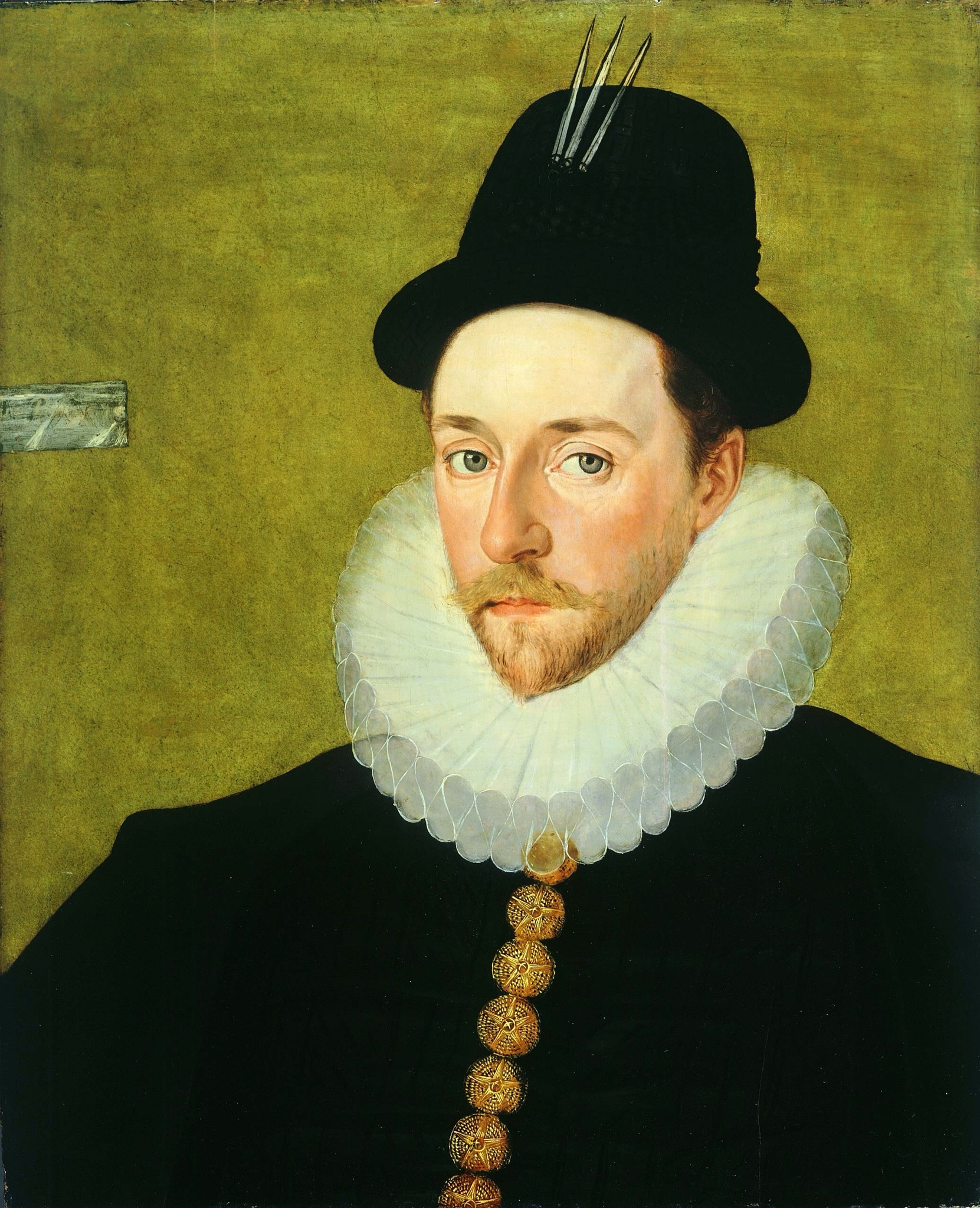
Peregrine Bertie, 13th Baron Willoughby de Eresby

Peregrine Bertie, 13th Baron Willoughby de Eresby (12 October 1555 in Wesel – 25 June 1601) was the son of Katherine Willoughby, 12th Baroness Willoughby de Eresby, and Richard Bertie. Richard Bertie was Lady Willoughby de Eresby's second husband, the first being Charles Brandon, Duke of Suffolk. Peregrine Bertie's half-brothers, Henry and Charles Brandon, died as teenagers four years before his birth. His sister Susan married the Earl of Kent and then the nephew of Bess of Hardwick. Owing to religious politics, his parents had to move outside England and the boy was born at Wesel on the River Rhine. His first marriage was to Mary de Vere, daughter of John de Vere, 16th Earl of Oxford.

== Early life ==
Born on 12 October 1555, he was baptized at the church of Saint Willibrord in Wesel on 14 October. On Elizabeth I's accession to the throne in 1558, his parents returned to England and applied for a patent of naturalization for him. He formally became English on 2 August 1559. He married Mary de Vere, daughter of John de Vere, 16th Earl of Oxford, between Christmas 1577 and 12 March 1578. When his mother died in 1580, he succeeded to her barony and he took his seat in the House of Lords on 16 January 1580.

== Diplomat and soldier ==
In 1582, he was commissioned to escort the Duke of Anjou from Canterbury to Antwerp. The French royal duke had arrived as a suitor of the un-married Elizabeth. In the same year he was sent to Denmark to invest Frederick II with the Order of the Garter. Lord Willoughby de Eresby arrived at Elsinore on 22 July and left on 27 September 1582. His ulterior purpose was to obtain an understanding whereby English merchant ships would not be molested while in Danish waters. In 1585, he returned to Denmark on behalf of Elizabeth in support of Henry III of Navarre and to obtain Danish help for England's efforts on behalf of the independent Netherlands.

These journeys were made at Bertie's expense as his correspondence with Francis Walsingham made clear; he was becoming desperate to be paid or to escape from the diplomatic duties. After two and a half months of working on the Danish king, Bertie got him to offer to try to persuade the Spanish king to retire from the Low Countries. Frederick also agreed to send 2,000 horses to back up the English force already in the Netherlands. On achieving this much, Peregrine set off for England by way of Hamburg, Emden and Amsterdam. From March 1586 Bertie served in the Netherlands as governor of Bergen-op-Zoom under Robert Dudley, 1st Earl of Leicester, who was Governor-General of the United Provinces. After Leicester's departure for England in December 1586, he was made general of the English forces. He suffered a major defeat at the Battle of Zutphen but redeemed himself with his victory at the Siege of Bergen. Subsequently, he fought for the Huguenots under Henry of Navarre. He commanded the English contingent at Henry's Siege of Paris in 1590.

Bertie's final appointment was Governor of Berwick upon Tweed on the Scottish border and Warden of the East March in 1598, displacing Robert Carey. At the request of Robert Cecil he organised the kidnapping of Edmund Ashfield, an Englishman visiting James VI of Scotland. Peregrine died on 25 June 1601 at Berwick aged 45, and was buried at St. James Church, Spilsby, Lincolnshire.

He had married (and separated from) Mary de Vere, the daughter of John de Vere, 16th Earl of Oxford. They had seven children: Robert Bertie, 1st Earl of Lindsey (d. 1642), Sir Peregrine Bertie (d. 1639), Henry Bertie of Lound (d. 1655), Katherine, Henry, Vere, Roger and one other.

== Landowner ==
It was on Peregrine's estate at Willoughby, Lincolnshire that the parents of John Smith of Jamestown rented a farm which was the site of John's birth.

== Popular song ==
The military career of Baron Willoughby is celebrated in the popular ballad, "Lord Willoughby's Welcome Home".

== Notes ==
Peerage of England
Preceded by Catherine Willoughby	Baron Willoughby de Eresby; 1580–1601	Succeeded by Robert Bertie
