= My Lord Willoughby's Welcome Home =

Traditional English ballad

My Lord Willoughby's Welcome Home is a traditional English ballad of the sixteenth century. A lute version was composed by the composer John Dowland. It celebrates the return of Peregrine Bertie, Lord Willoughby to England after he had led an expeditionary force to assist the Dutch Republic in its war for independence from Spain. Willoughby was regarded as a popular Protestant hero, and the lyrics commemorate his exploits in battle.

== Bibliography ==
- Graham Wade. A Concise Guide to Understanding Music. Mel Bay Publications, 2011.
