= Edward Windsor, 3rd Baron Windsor =

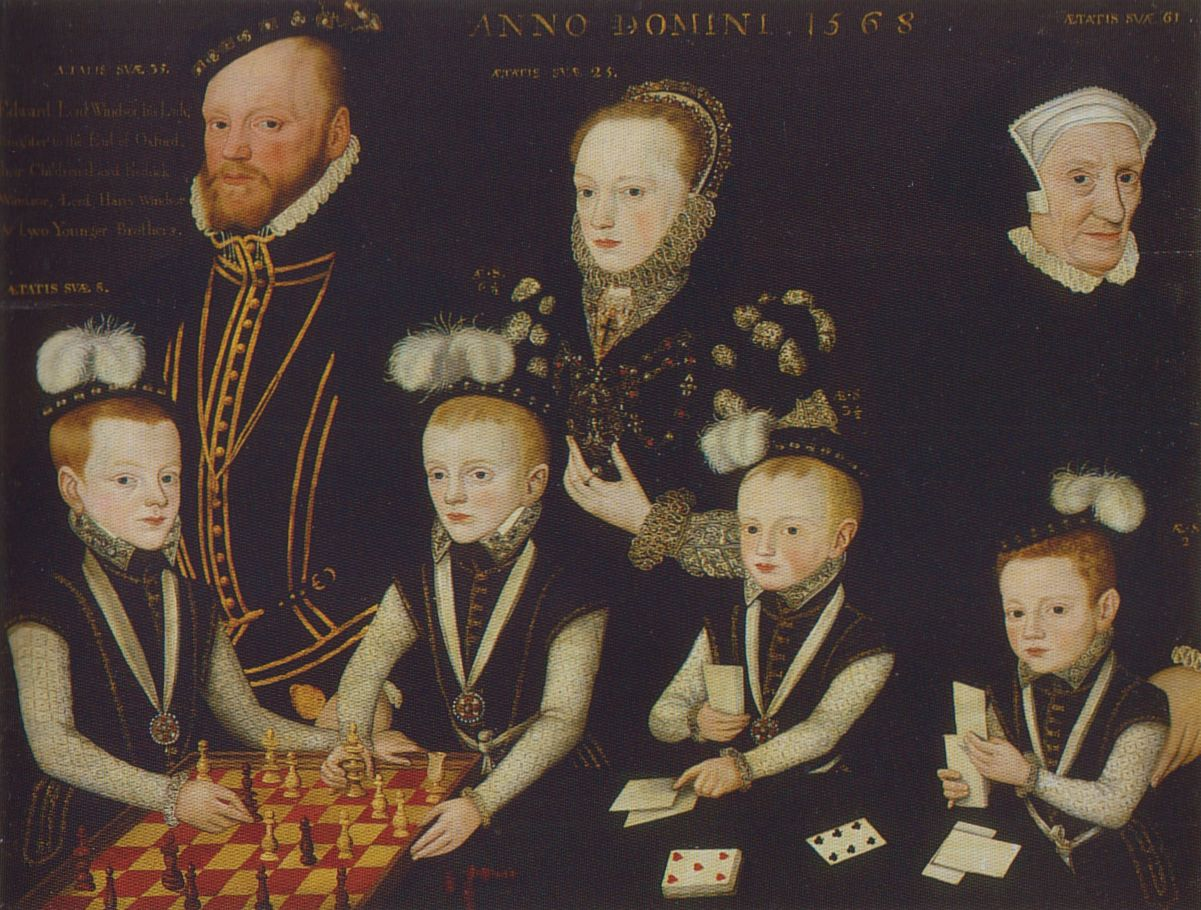
Edward Windsor and his family, 1568

Edward Windsor, 3rd Baron Windsor (1532 – 24 January 1574), was an English peer.

== Early life ==
Edward was born into a landowning family of Norman ancestry that had steadily increased its possessions through the Middle Ages, including estates in Berkshire, Buckinghamshire, Hampshire, Middlesex and Surrey. They were hereditary wardens of Windsor Castle, from which they derived their name, and their close association with the monarchy temporarily lost them their lands on the defeat of Richard III in 1485. His grandfather, the first Lord Windsor was born Andrew Windsor and made Keeper of the wardrobe in 1506 - a position in the king's secret financial machinery which gave him control of a budget of thousands of pounds and great opportunities for profit. He was an important part of the network of his cousin, the notorious Edmund Dudley, but early knowledge of the king's death allowed him to side-step Dudley's fall and he kept his position until his death in 1543. On his accession in 1509, the new King Henry VIII signalled his acceptance of Sir Andrew into the inner circles of government by making him Knight of the Bath and he was ennobled 20 years later.

In his grandfather's dotage in 1542, during a visit by King Henry VIII, Lord Windsor was obliged to surrender one of the family manors, Stanwell between Hampton Court and Windsor to the crown, in return given a more modest historic farm of Hewell Grange, a manor of Tardebigge in north Worcestershire. The following year his grandfather died aged approximately 74. By contrast, his father, the 2nd Baron Windsor, only survived 13 more years. This enabled Edward to succeed as 3rd Baron Windsor in 1558, at age 26.

== Adult life ==
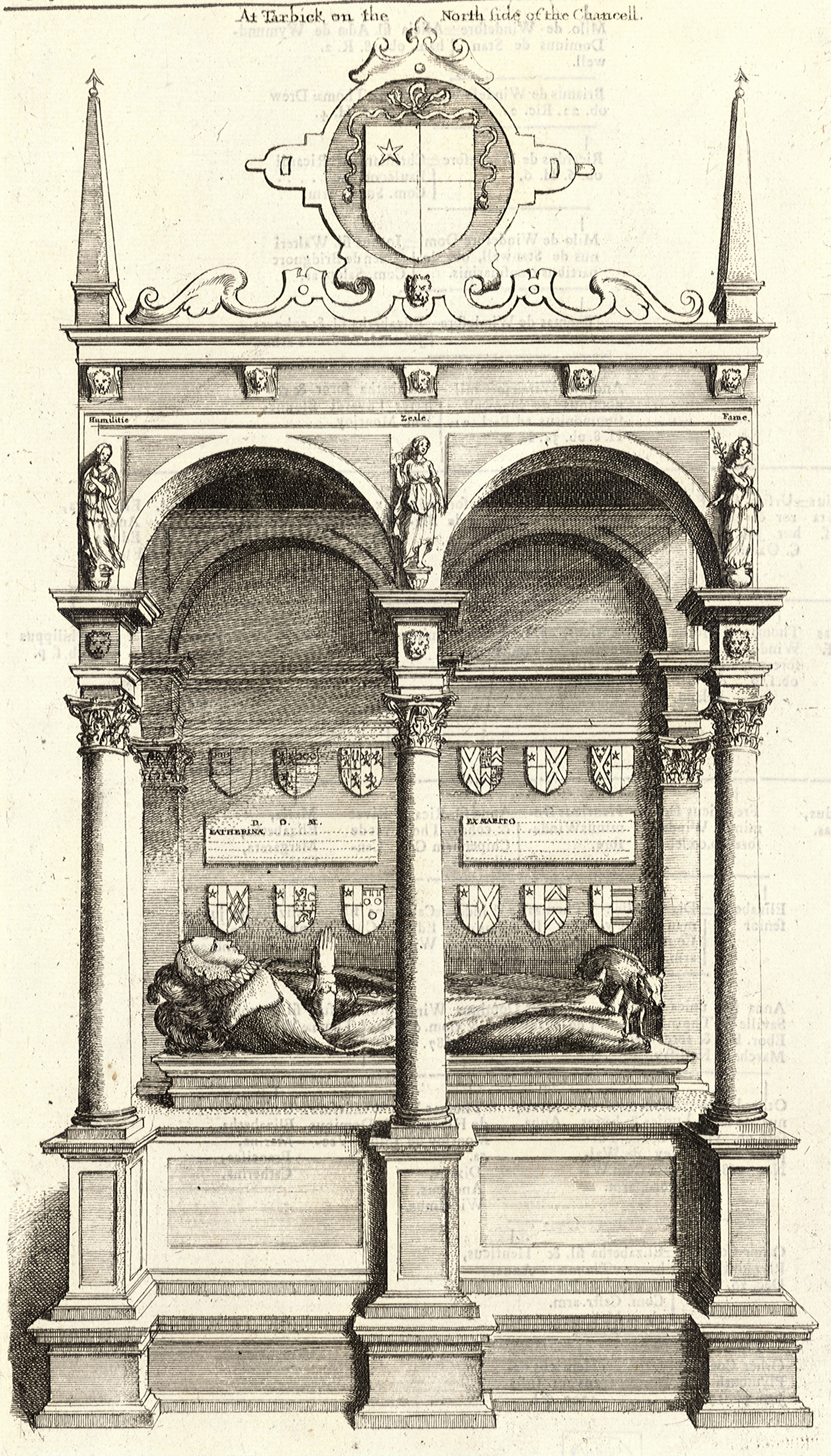
Monument to Lady Katherine de Vere, Tardebigge Church, Worcestershire

Edward Windsor married Lady Katherine de Vere (1538–1600), the daughter of John de Vere, 16th Earl of Oxford and his first wife, Dorothy Neville. Katherine had a prominent younger half-brother and sister by her father's second marriage to Marjory Golding, Edward de Vere, 17th Earl of Oxford, and Mary de Vere.

On 2 October 1553, the day after the coronation of Queen Mary, he was appointed a Knight of the Carpet. He fought at the Battle of St Quentin (1557), an engagement of the Italian War of 1551–1559, as part of an English force commanded by Francis Russell, 2nd Earl of Bedford.

In 1558, he succeeded to his father's title of Baron Windsor, which brought him a seat in the House of Lords during sessions of parliament.

In 1563 he sold the remaining Middlesex family manor of Littleton (bought in 1528) to Francis Vaughan. In 1566, Queen Elizabeth visited Windsor at his seat of Bradenham, Buckinghamshire. A firm Roman Catholic, he lived many years on the continent of Europe.

Windsor was admitted to the bar as a member of the Middle Temple, the bench book of which records:

"Ordered, that Edward lord Windsor shall have, at his pleasure, his chamber called "the Parliament Chamber", notwithstanding the admission of Mr. Jerome Corbet, who will move therefrom whenever the said lord or Frederick, his eldest son, shall wish to reside there; but they must pay Corbet for his expenses in the said chamber."

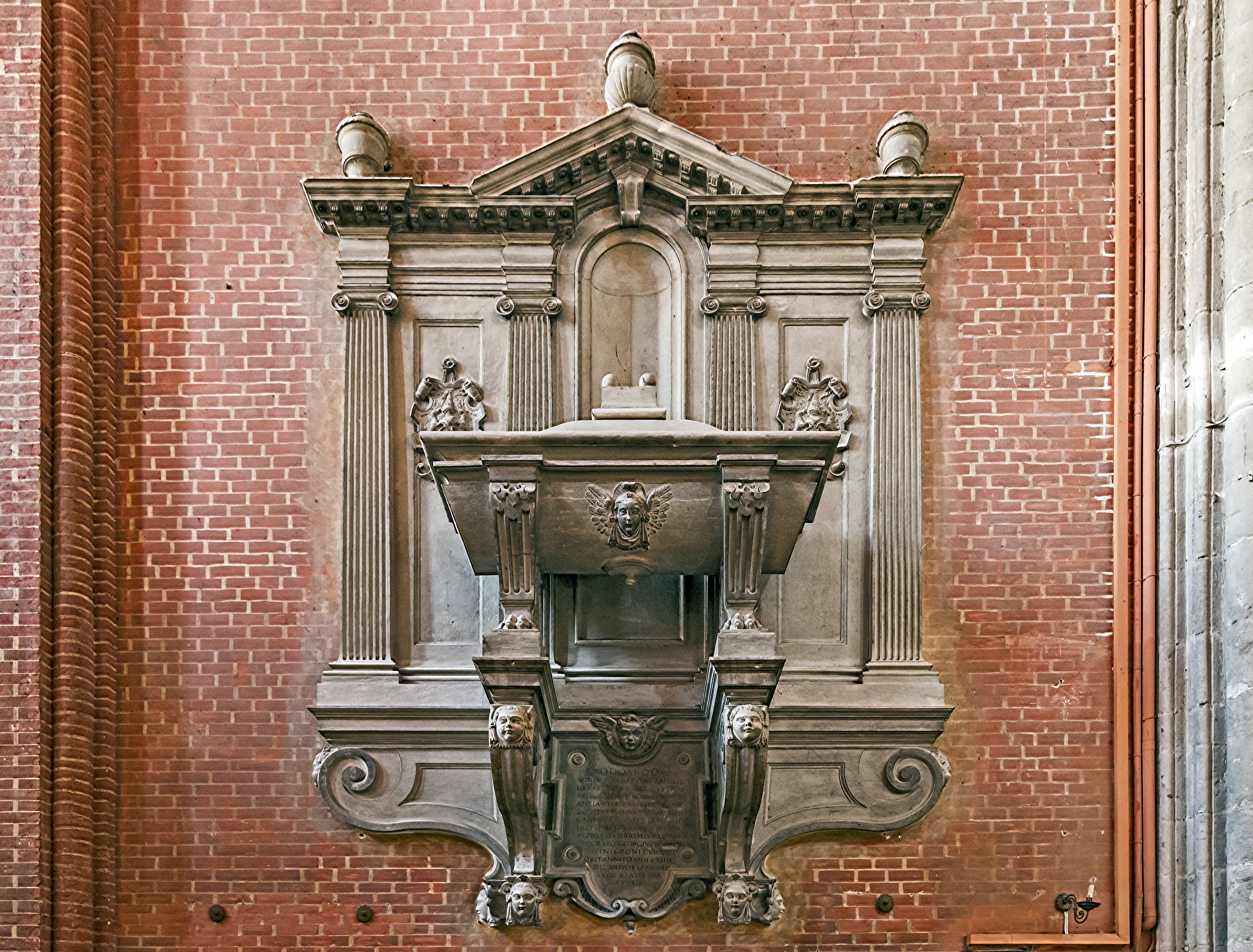
Tomb in Santi Giovanni e Paolo, Venice

He died in Venice, where he is buried in the Basilica of San Giovanni & San Paolo. His monument there has been called "a sober, classical work attributed to Alessandro Vittoria".

Edward Windsor's sons by Katherine were Frederick Windsor (1559–1585), otherwise known as Ferdinand, and Henry Windsor (1562–1605), both of whom succeeded to their father's honours, becoming respectively the fourth and fifth Lord Windsor.

Peerage of England
Preceded by William Windsor	Baron Windsor; 1558–1574	Succeeded by Frederick Windsor
