= Margery Golding =

- Countess of Oxford
- Born: c. 1526; Belchamp St Paul
- Died: 2 December 1568
- Noble family: de Vere (by marriage)
- Spouse: John de Vere, 16th Earl of Oxford
- Issue: Edward de Vere, 17th Earl of Oxford; Mary, Baroness Willoughby de Eresby
- Father: Sir John Golding
- Mother: Elizabeth Hammond

Margery Golding, Countess of Oxford (c. 1526 – 2 December 1568) was the second wife of John de Vere, 16th Earl of Oxford, the mother of Edward de Vere, 17th Earl of Oxford, and the half-sister of Arthur Golding, the English translator.

== Early life and family ==
She was born circa 1526, in Belchamp St Paul, the third child and the first daughter to Sir John Golding and his first wife, Elizabeth Tonge/Hammond, the daughter of Thomas Tonge and the widow of Reginald Hammond.

Her mother died on 27 November 1527, and her father remarried Ursula Marston (d. 1564), the daughter of William Marston of Horton, Epsom, Surrey, leading to seven younger half-siblings. Among these was Arthur Golding, a translator of the late Renaissance of otherwise Latin-only Classical texts.

== Marriage and issue ==
On 1 August 1548, in Belchamp St Paul, Margery married John de Vere, 16th Earl of Oxford. The couple had two children:

- Edward de Vere, 17th Earl of Oxford; married firstly Anne Cecil, daughter William Cecil, 1st Baron Burghley, and Mildred Cooke. He married secondly Elizabeth Trentham, daughter of Thomas Trentham. He had children from both marriages.
- Mary de Vere; married firstly Peregrine Bertie, 13th Baron Willoughby de Eresby, with whom she had one son, Robert Bertie, 1st Earl of Lindsey. She married secondly Sir Eustace Hart.

John also had a child, Katherine, from his previous marriage to Dorothy Neville, daughter of Ralph Neville, 4th Earl of Westmorland.

Shortly after the 16th Earl of Oxford's death in 1562, the Countess of Oxford married Sir Charles Tyrrel (d. 1570), the 6th son of Sir Thomas Tyrell (sic) of Heron, Essex and Constance, daughter of John Blount, Lord Mountjoy.
