= Arthur Golding =

16th-century English linguist and translator

- Born: 1536
- Died: 1606 (aged 69–70)

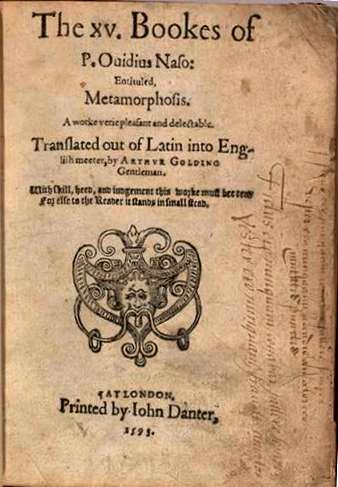
Title page of The XV. Bookes of P. Ouidius Naso: Entituled, Metamorphosis. Translated out of Latin into English meeter by Arthvr Golding was first printed in 1567 and was reprinted five times by 1603. This title page is from the 1593 edition printed by John Danter.

Arthur Golding (c. 1536 – May 1606) was an English translator of more than 30 works from Latin into English. While primarily remembered today for his translation of Ovid's Metamorphoses because of its influence on William Shakespeare's works, in his own time he was most famous for his translation of Caesar's Commentaries, and his translations of the sermons of John Calvin were important in spreading the doctrines of the Protestant Reformation.

== Biography ==
Arthur Golding was born in East Anglia, before 25 May 1535/36, the second son of John Golding of Belchamp St Paul and Halstead, Essex, an auditor of the Exchequer, and his second wife, Ursula (d. c. 1564), daughter and co-heir of William Merston of Horton in Surrey, in a family of eleven children (four from John Golding's first wife, Elizabeth). In the 15th and 16th centuries, the Golding family had prospered in the cloth trade, and by marrying heiresses had become fairly wealthy and respectable by the time of Arthur's birth, probably in London.

When Golding was 11, his father died. In 1548, his half-sister Margery, by John's first wife, became the second wife of John de Vere, 16th Earl of Oxford, and, by 1552, his brother Henry was steward for his brother-in-law's household. Another sister Dorothy married Edmund Docwra MP of Crookham, Berkshire, and was mother of the soldier and statesman Henry Docwra, 1st Baron Docwra of Culmore.

By 1549, Arthur was in the service of Edward Seymour, 1st Duke of Somerset, then Lord Protector. He matriculated as a fellow commoner at Jesus College, Cambridge in 1552. Henry was elected to Parliament in 1558, probably because of Oxford's influence, and from the later 1550s, Arthur worked on a translation of Pompeius Trogus that he planned to dedicate to Oxford. But Oxford died in August 1562, and his son Edward, the 17th earl, became a ward in the house of William Cecil, Lord Burghley, in The Strand. Cecil appears to have employed Golding as his nephew's receiver for several years, for two of his dedications are dated from Cecil House, and in 1567 he dated a dedication from Barwicke, one of the de Vere manors near White Colne, Essex.

Golding married Usula (d. 1610), daughter of John Roydon of Chilham, Kent, sometime before 1575. They had eight children. The death in 1576 of an older brother, Henry, left him with some property, but it was heavily encumbered with debt and litigation with the heirs of his brother's widow proved expensive. Golding borrowed heavily in the 1580s and was in debtors' prison in the early 1590s. He died in May 1606 and was buried on 13 May at St Andrew's Church, Belchamp St Paul.

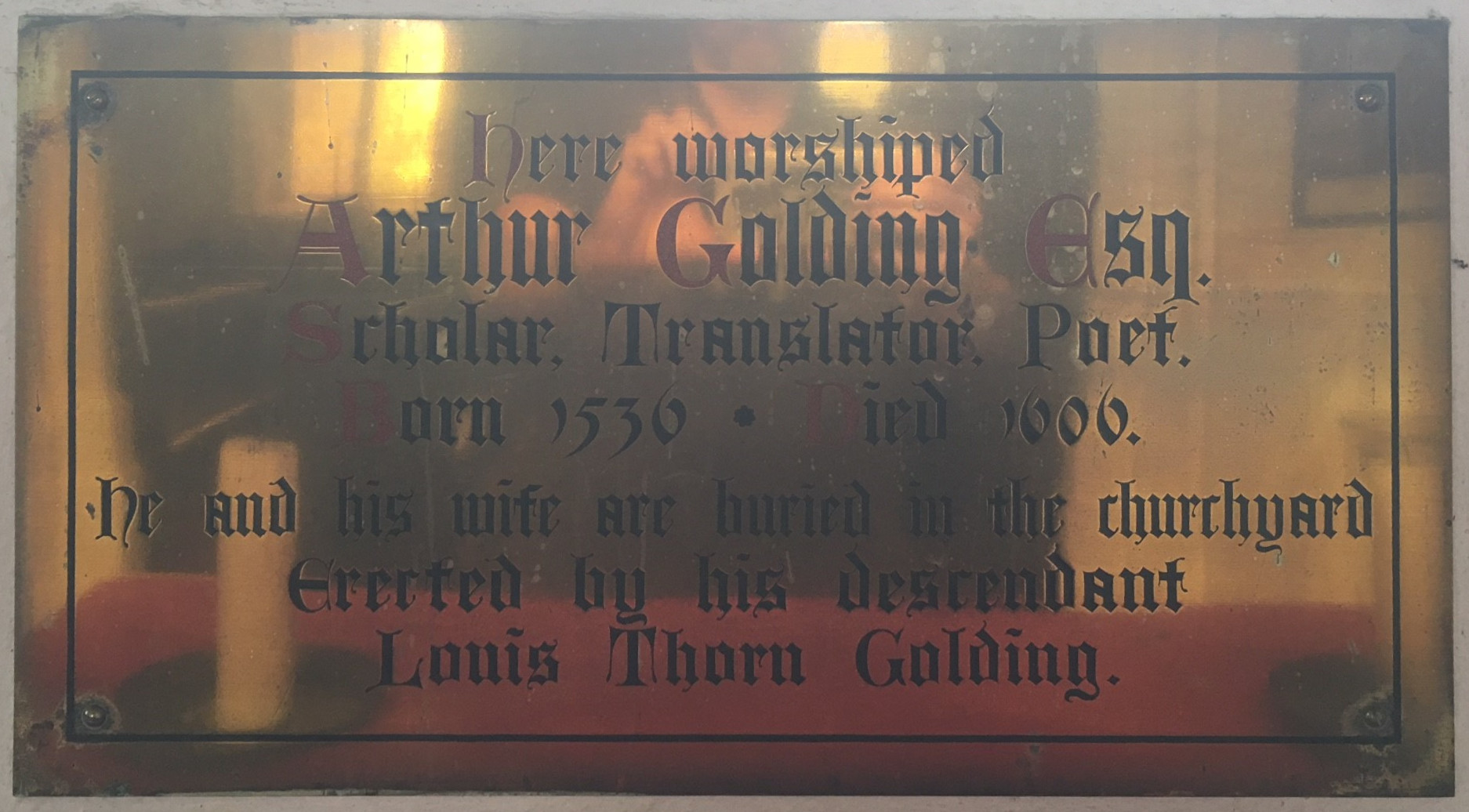
Memorial to Arthur Golding in St Andrew's Church, Belchamp St Paul

== Translation of Ovid ==
Golding is remembered chiefly for his translation of Ovid's Metamorphoses. The first edition appeared in 1567 and was the first to be translated directly from Latin into English. However, Golding may not have been the first, and certainly not the only early Elizabethan author to attempt a translation of this great work. In his Pleasant Fable of Hermaphroditus and Salmacis (1565), Thomas Peend says that he had already started on his own version when he heard that another gentleman—Golding—was engaged on the same task, and so he gave up. A revised edition appeared in 1575 and there were further editions in 1587, 1603 and 1612. Many other translations followed, including George Sandys's (1621) and Samuel Garth's (1717). Golding's translation, however, was read by Shakespeare and Spenser and "conveys a spirited Ovid with all his range of emotion and diversity of plot". Golding represents the stories he translates in a vivid way, "delivering every twist and turn in as whole-hearted a manner as possible". His translations are clear, faithful and fluent, as seen in this excerpt where Ovid compares blood gushing from Pyramus' wound to water bursting from a pipe:

And when he had bewept and kist the garment which he knew,
Receyve thou my bloud too (quoth he) and therewithal he drew
His sworde, the which among his guttes he thrust, and by and by
Did draw it from the bleeding wound beginning for to die,
And cast himself upon his backe, the bloud did spin on hie
As when a Conduite pipe is crackt, the water bursting out
Doth shote it selfe a great way off and pierce the Ayre about. (4.143–9)

Written in rhyming couplets of iambic heptameter (fourteeners), the book's full title was The Fyrst Fower Bookes of P. Ovidius Nasos Worke, Entitled Metamorphosis, Translated Oute of Latin into Englishe Meter (1565). In 1567 Golding completed all fifteen books of Ovid's poem. The influence of this book and ultimately its translation did not go unnoticed and was influential to many great writers. Its influence has been detected in Spenser's Faerie Queene, in John Studley's translations of Seneca, in Christopher Marlowe's Tamburlaine and Edward II, and many more. Even William Shakespeare knew of Golding's Ovid and recalls it in a number of his plays. However, Shakespeare did have knowledge of versions other than Golding's—for instance, a passage in Shakespeare's The Tempest seems to have a closer resemblance to the original Latin text than to Golding's English version.

Golding's translation, though, is without any question the most influential version on Shakespeare, and Shakespeare's use of it has become an important part of the history of the translation itself. As a man of strong Puritan sympathies, he intended the work to be read as a moral allegory, and a verse on the title page cautioned the reader that:

With skill heede and judgment thys work must bee red
For else to the reader it stands in small stead.

He prefixed a long metrical explanation of his reasons for considering it a work of edification, in which he asked his readers to look past the heretical content of the pagan poem, set forth the morals which he supposed to underlie the stories, and attempted to show how the pagan machinery might be brought into line with Christian thought.

It was from Golding's pages that many of the Elizabethans drew their knowledge of classical mythology. In his ABC of Reading, Ezra Pound reproduced passages of the translation, noting: "Though it is the most beautiful book in the English language, I am not citing it for its decorative purposes but its narrative quality."

== Other translations ==
Most of Golding's work consists of prose translations that were from Latin and French texts. A Calvinist, he translated contemporary Protestant leaders: Heinrich Bullinger, William, Prince of Orange, Theodore Beza, and Philippe de Mornay. He translated also Leonardo Bruni's History of the War Against the Goths, Froissart's Chronicles in Sleidan's epitome, and Aesop's fables. Further translations were: the Commentaries of Caesar (1563, 1565, 1590), the history of Junianus Justinus (1564), the theological writings of Niels Hemmingsen (1569) and David Chytraeus (1570), Theodore Beza's Tragedie of Abrahams Sacrifice (1575), the De Beneficiis of Seneca the Younger (1578), the geography of Pomponius Mela (1585), the Polyhistor of Gaius Julius Solinus (1587), Calvin's commentaries on the Psalms (1571), his sermons on the Galatians and Ephesians, on Deuteronomy and the Book of Job.

Golding was given the job of completing John Brende's translation of Caesar's Gallic War when Brende died. Sir William Cecil passed the manuscript to Golding for completion sometime between Brende's death in 1560 or 1561 (the exact year he died is not certain) and 1564. At the same time Golding was working on the first four books of Ovid's Metamorphoses, which he finished in December 1564. He completed a translation begun by Philip Sidney from Philippe de Mornay, A Worke concerning the Trewnesse of the Christian Religion (1587).

He produced few original works. One was the account of a murder in 1573 and another of a prose Discourse on the earthquake of 1580, in which he saw a judgment of God on the wickedness of his time. He inherited three considerable estates in Essex, the greater part of which he sold in 1595. The last record of Golding in an order dated 25 July 1605, giving him license to print some of his works.

In recent years Golding's prose translations of the Psalms (included in his translation of Calvin's Commentaries) have attracted attention for their accuracy, clarity, good English and sober poise. They have been extracted from the Commentary and published separately, well-edited by Richard G. Barnes, as The first separate edition of the Psalms of David and others / as rendered into English by Arthur Golding (San Francisco, Arion, 1971). Donald Davie discusses them with high praise, and reprints many, in The Psalms in English (Penguin, 1996).

Golding, in the translation of The sermons of J. Calvin upon Deuteronomie, has the first known recorded instance of the idiom "neither here nor there".

Over the course of his lifetime, Golding translated up to 5.5 million words.

== Legacy ==
Golding's "puritan cast of mind" is an important aspect of his writing. During his time it was more uncommon to translate works that reflect pagan society, such as works by Ovid. Golding, however, did not allow conformity to sway his work. Ovid's Metamorphoses, for example, does not mention Christian symbols; in fact, it was written before Christ's time. What makes Arthur Golding an influential and important character to study is his desire to pull Christian symbolism from the text and write in such a way as to make the work accessible to his peers. Undoubtedly, Golding spent time translating works by Calvin that would further his reputation as a decent Puritan, but by challenging the authority that condemns so-called "pagan" texts such as the Metamorphoses, Golding forged a path for subsequent writers. Golding's influence upon Shakespeare's knowledge of Ovid cannot be diminished. Without Golding's translation, common knowledge of the ancient text would not have been understood in the same clear light. In essence, Golding's contribution to English literature was his translation of the Metamorphoses because not only does he create an accessible work for many to understand, but he also translates in such a way as to infuse the work with Christian theology.
