= Nordkapp (Bjørnøya) =

Headland of Bjørnøya

Coordinates: 74°30.9′N 19°5.3′E

Nordkapp is located on the northern tip of Bear Island.

Nordkapp (North Cape) is the northernmost point of Bear Island in Arctic Norway, located at the northern extreme of the island. The cape is some 230 km south of Sørkapp, Svalbard and 415 km north of mainland Norway (Ingøy).
