= Ralph Neville, 4th Earl of Westmorland =

English peer (1498–1549)

Ralph Neville
- 4th Earl of Westmorland
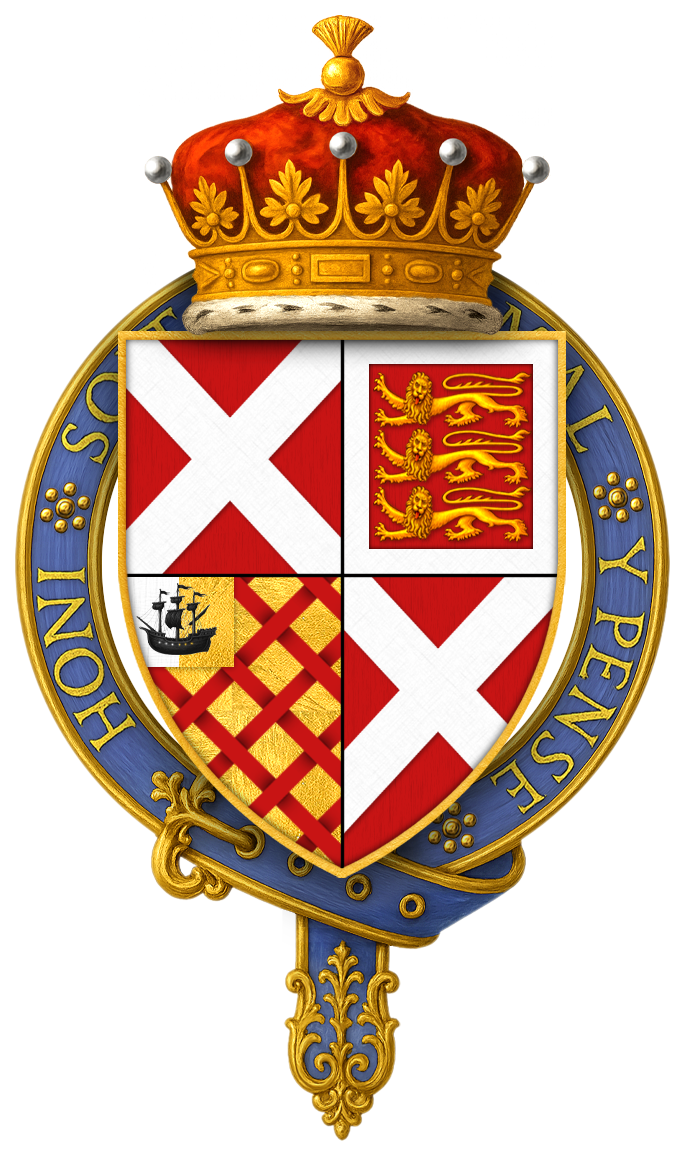
- Arms of Sir Ralph Neville, 4th Earl of Westmorland, KG
- Born: 21 February 1498
- Died: 24 April 1549 (aged 51)
- Buried: St Mary's Church, Staindrop, Durham
- Noble family: House of Neville
- Spouse: Katherine Stafford
- Issue: Henry Neville, 5th Earl of Westmorland; Sir Thomas Neville; Edward Neville; Christopher Neville; George Neville; Ralph Neville; Cuthbert Neville; Dorothy Neville; Mary Neville; Margaret Neville; Elizabeth Neville; Eleanor Neville; Anne Neville; Ursula Neville
- Father: Ralph Neville, Lord Neville
- Mother: Edith Sandys

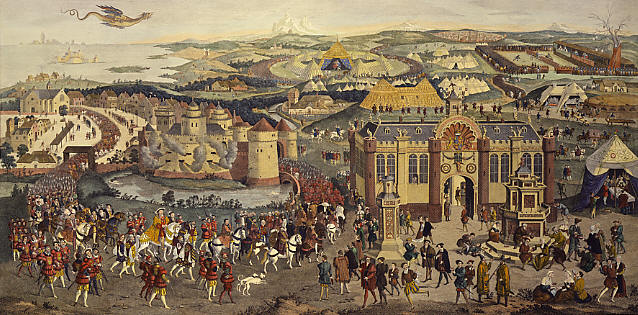
Field of the Cloth of Gold, engraving by James Basire (1774)

Ralph Neville, 4th Earl of Westmorland KG (21 February 1498 – 24 April 1549), was an English peer and soldier. He was the grandson of Ralph Neville, 3rd Earl of Westmorland, and the father of Henry Neville, 5th Earl of Westmorland.

== Family ==
Ralph Neville, born 21 February 1498, was the son of Ralph Neville (d. 1498) and Edith Sandys (d. 22 August 1529), daughter of Sir William Sandys of the Vyne by Edith Cheyne, daughter of Sir John Cheyne. He was the grandson of Ralph Neville, 3rd Earl of Westmorland, and Isabel Booth.

Neville had a brother who died young, and a sister, Isabel, who married firstly, Sir Robert Plumpton, and secondly, Lawrence Kighley, Esq. Another sister, Cecilia, married John Weston and was the mother of Robert Weston.

After his father's death in 1498, Neville's mother, Edith, married Thomas Darcy, 1st Baron Darcy of Darcy, who was beheaded on Tower Hill 30 June 1537 for his part in the Pilgrimage of Grace. She died at Stepney on 22 August 1529, and was buried at the Friars Observant, Greenwich.

== Career ==
Neville inherited the earldom of Westmorland as an infant at the death of his grandfather on 6 February 1499. On 9 July 1510, at about the age of twelve, his wardship was granted to Edward Stafford, 3rd Duke of Buckingham.

As a young man, Westmorland was among those who attended King Henry VIII at the Field of the Cloth of Gold in June 1520 and at his meeting with Emperor Charles V at Gravelines in July. On 7 November 1520 he had livery of his lands. He was present at the reception for the Emperor near Dover in May 1522. In 1522–23 Westmorland saw military service on the Scottish border, where he was knighted in the latter year by Thomas Howard, then Earl of Surrey. He was installed as a member of the Order of the Garter on 25 June 1525, and before 5 February 1526 was a member of the king's Privy Council. He continued to serve on the northern border, being appointed Deputy Captain of Berwick and Vice Warden of the East and Middle Marches from October 1525 to September 1526 under the King's illegitimate son, the Duke of Richmond. In January 1526 he was the chief envoy charged with concluding a truce with Scotland.

On 13 July 1530 Westmorland was among those who signed the letter to Pope Clement VII urging the annulment of the king's marriage to his first wife, Catherine of Aragon. In May 1534 he was a member of a commission directed to inquire into alleged treasonous activities by William Dacre, 3rd Baron Dacre of Gilsland. He again saw military service in the north when in June and July 1535 he was among those charged with suppressing disorders in Northumberland, Cumberland, and Westmorland. On 15 May 1536, he was one of the peers who took part in the trial of the king's second wife, Anne Boleyn. During the Pilgrimage of Grace in 1536–37 Westmorland remained loyal to the king, which Archbold notes is 'surprising, considering his family connections'. He refused an appointment as Warden of the East and Middle Marches at this time, allegedly because his men supported the rising. At the time Norfolk described him as 'a man of such heat and hastiness of nature' as to be 'unmeet' for the appointment. However, as Dockray notes, Norfolk may have been disparaging a potential rival. On 14 January 1537 he was made a member of the Council of the North.

When his three children—Henry, Dorothy and Margaret—married in a triple-Neville ceremony in 1536, both Henry VIII and his third wife, Jane Seymour, attended the wedding.

On 12 November 1537 Westmorland attended the funeral of the king's third wife, Jane Seymour. In 1538 he was again disparaged, on this occasion being described by an anonymous writer as a man 'of great power without wit or knowledge'. In May 1544 he was in command of the East and Middle Marches during the invasion of Scotland under Edward Seymour, 1st Earl of Hertford.

Westmorland died on 24 April 1549, aged 51, and was buried at Staindrop, Durham. His widow, Katherine, died 14 May 1555 at Holywell in Shoreditch, the house of her son-in-law, Henry Manners, 2nd Earl of Rutland, and was buried 17 May 1555 at St Leonard's, Shoreditch.

== Marriage and issue ==
Westmorland was first betrothed to Elizabeth Stafford (c.1497 – 30 November 1558), the eldest daughter of his guardian, Edward Stafford, 3rd Duke of Buckingham, and Eleanor Percy, with whom he is said to have been in love, and whom he was to have married before Christmas 1512. However about that time Thomas Howard made suit for her, and Elizabeth married Howard, as his second wife, before 8 January 1513. Westmorland married instead, before June 1520, Stafford's second daughter, Katherine (d. 14 May 1555). They had eighteen children, including:

- Henry Neville, 5th Earl of Westmorland, who married, at a triple Neville-sibling marriage ceremony on 3 July 1536 at Holywell in Shoreditch, Anne Manners, the daughter of Thomas Manners, 1st Earl of Rutland. Their son, Charles Neville, 6th Earl of Westmorland, married, about 1563/4, Jane Howard (buried 30 June 1593), the daughter of Henry Howard, Earl of Surrey. He took part with his uncles, Christopher Neville and Cuthbert Neville, in the Northern Rebellion of 1569, was attainted in 1571, whereby all his honours were forfeited and fled to the continent, where he was involved for many years in plots on behalf of Mary, Queen of Scots, against Queen Elizabeth. He died in exile at Nieuport in Flanders on 16 November 1601.
- Sir Thomas Neville.
- Edward Neville.
- Christopher Neville (fl. 1549–1575) of Kirkbymoorside, Yorkshire, fourth son, who married Anne Fulthorpe (d. after 1570), widow of Francis Wandesford, of Kirklington, Yorkshire, and daughter and heir of John Fulthorpe of Hipswell, Yorkshire. There was no issue of the marriage. He was attainted for treason in May 1571 for his part in the Northern Rebellion of 1569, and fled to the continent, where he died in exile.
- George Neville.
- Ralph Neville (d.1565).
- Cuthbert Neville (fl. 1549–1569) of Brancepeth, Durham. He took part in the Northern Rebellion of 1569 with his brother, was attainted, and died in exile in the Spanish Netherlands.
- Dorothy Neville (d.1548), who married, at a triple Neville-sibling marriage ceremony on 3 July 1536 at Holywell in Shoreditch, as his first wife, John de Vere, 16th Earl of Oxford, and with him had two daughters: Faith, who died as an infant, and Katherine, who married Edward Windsor, 3rd Baron Windsor. Dorothy fled the marriage in about January 1546, citing "'the vnkynde [unkind] dealing of the earl.'" In May of that year, de Vere bigamously married one of his mistresses, Joan Jockey of Earls Colne, at White Colne Church. Five men (including a knight and a lord) broke into Oxford's home while he was away and either cut Jockey's nose clean off or cut the "skin at the base of the nostrils into flaps to give her a permanently grotesque appearance," a traditional punishment for "unsocial behavior." Though Joan Jockey survived the attack, the Earl definitively 'put her away.'" In 1585, when attesting to the legitimacy of Oxford's marriage to Margery Golding, members of his household reported that "'all theise women were shaken off by the same Earle ... before the said lady Dorothie dyed'" on "about 6 January 1548, at a parsonage located a half mile from distant Salisbury."
- Mary Neville, who married Sir Thomas Danby of Farnley Hall, Yorkshire, eldest son of Sir Christopher Danby. Sir Thomas Danby appears to have participated with his brothers-in-law, Christopher Neville and Cuthbert Neville, in the Northern Rebellion of 1569.
- Margaret Neville (d. 13 October 1559), who married, at a triple Neville-sibling marriage ceremony on 3 July 1536 at Holywell in Shoreditch, as his first wife, Henry Manners, 2nd Earl of Rutland, and had issue.
- Elizabeth Neville, who married, as his first wife, Thomas Dacre, 4th Baron Dacre (d. 1 July 1566) of Gilsland, but died without issue. After Elizabeth Neville's death, Thomas Dacre married Elizabeth Leyburne (buried 18 September 1567), who, after Dacre's death, married, as his third wife, Thomas Howard, 4th Duke of Norfolk.
- Eleanor Neville, who married, as his first wife, Sir Bryan Stapleton (d. 13 December 1606) of Carlton, Yorkshire, eldest son of Sir Richard Stapleton (c.1516 – 1585), 'one of the carpet knights made at the accession of Queen Mary', and Thomasin Amadas, the daughter of Robert Amadas, goldsmith and master of King Henry VIII's jewel house. After Eleanor Neville's death, Sir Brian Stapleton married Elizabeth Darcy, the daughter of George Darcy, 2nd Baron Darcy de Darcy.
- Anne Neville (buried 17 July 1583 at Alcester, Warwickshire), who married, about 1553, Sir Fulke Greville (1536–1606), de jure 4th Baron Willoughby de Broke, and by him had issue a son, Fulke Greville, 1st Baron Brooke, friend of Sir Philip Sidney, and a daughter, Margaret Greville (1561–1631/2), who married Sir Richard Verney.
- Ursula Neville.

== Notes ==
Peerage of England
Preceded by Ralph Neville	Earl of Westmorland; 1499–1549	Succeeded by Henry Neville
