= Hartest =

Village in Suffolk, England

Coordinates: 52.13995°N 0.67878°E

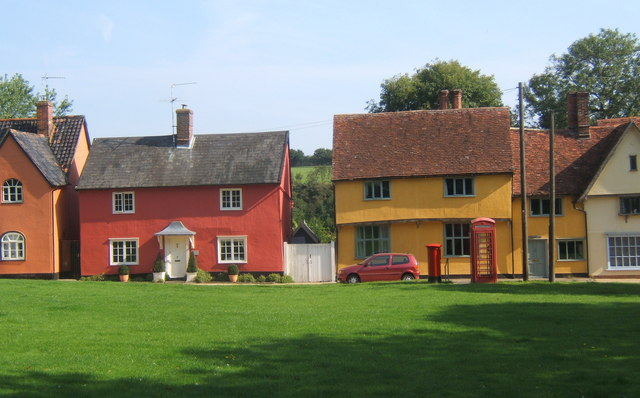
- Bright cottages lining the green at Hartest

- Location within Suffolk
- Population: 446 {2011}
- OS grid reference: TL834524
- District: Babergh
- Shire county: Suffolk
- Region: East
- Country: England
- Sovereign state: United Kingdom
- Post town: BURY ST EDMUNDS
- Postcode district: IP29
- Dialling code: 01284
- Police: Suffolk
- Fire: Suffolk
- Ambulance: East of England
- UK Parliament: South Suffolk

Hartest is a small village and civil parish in the Babergh district of the English county of Suffolk. It is located halfway between Bury St. Edmunds and Sudbury on the B1066 road in the Glem valley. Brockley is two miles north.

The village of Hartest dates back to before 1086 and features in the Domesday Book. The name 'Hartest' is thought to mean either 'Stag Hill' or 'Stag Wood'. It is claimed that there are no other villages, towns or cities in the world of the same name.

The village is centred on the large village green, fringed by an array of brightly coloured cottages, the village hall or institute, the medieval All Saints church and the Crown public house, formerly Hartest Hall the local landowner's seat. There is an annual fete held on the village green at the end of August each year.

Running east of the village centre is Hartest Hill, the steepest in Suffolk.

Former Special Envoy for the Archbishop of Canterbury and Islamic Jihad Organization hostage, Terry Waite lives in the village.

== Local Features and Landmarks ==
On the north side of the village green stands a large boulder named the 'Hartest Stone'. This boulder, thought to have been placed on that spot in the early 18th century, has attracted speculation over its origins. One theory is that the boulder was moved by sled from the nearby Somerton Hill to celebrate the Peace of Utrecht and the Duke of Marlborough's victories in the War of the Spanish Succession. Another theory suggests the boulder was moved (for the same reasons) from Somerton Common. A third theory suggests the boulder was found in a clay pit owned by one Mr Carter, who had the stone moved to its current location. Local traditions say that the boulder will turn over at the stroke of midnight and sitting on the boulder at midnight will bring a wife or good fortune.

Hartest Wood stands on the outskirts of Hartest. The wood was planted in 1999 as part of the Woodland Trust's 'Woods on your doorstep' scheme to commemorate the new millennium. The wood contains 187 oak trees, representing every household in Hartest at the time. At the centre of the woods an art installation designed by Geoffrey Clarke called 'The Gift' can be found.

The village pub, The Crown (previously 'the Crown Inn') stands on the South side of the green. The Crown is a sixteenth century Grade II Listed building and was previously used as a Moot Hall for the village and surrounding area.
