= Robert Anstruther (diplomat) =

Scottish-British courtier and diplomat

Sir Robert Anstruther of Anstruther (1578–1645), was a Scottish and English courtier and diplomat.

== Family ==
Robert Anstruther was a son of James Anstruther (d. 1606) and Jean Scott of Abbotshall. He was from Anstruther in Fife, Scotland.

James Anstruther was the king's carver and Master of the Household. His eldest son, William Anstruther of Anstruther was a gentleman of the king's bedchamber, but had no heirs, so, in time, the Anstruther estates came to Robert's eldest son, Philip Anstruther.

On 22 April 1617, Sir Robert Anstruther married Mary Swift, the daughter of Sir Robert Swift of Doncaster. They had five children

1. Robert (born c. 1629)
2. Philip (d. 1702)
3. Christian (died in infancy)
4. Elizabeth
5. Sarah

== Early Career, 1598-1618 ==
Robert Anstruther graduated from St Salvator's College, St Andrews and was further educated as a page at the court of Christian IV of Denmark in 1598. Around this time he also served as a courtier to John, Prince of Schleswig-Holstein when the latter went to Russia to marry the daughter of the Tsar. Anstruther was reported to have been present at Prince John's funeral there.

By 1603, Anstruther was back at the court of Christian IV, carrying falcons to Denmark–Norway as a gift from James VI. Anstruther remained in the Danish court as a Stuart agent from 1606, and by 1612 he was noted as a famulis communis of the two kings. That year, along with his step-relative Sir James Spens of Wormiston, who was serving as British ambassador to Sweden, he helped to broker the Treaty of Knäred, which brought peace between Sweden and Denmark-Norway. It was because of this service that Robert Anstruther received his knighthood, although it is unclear if this was from Christian IV or James VI and I. King James referred to Anstruther as a knight on 8 April 1613 when he brought the treaty to London for his signature. Between 1614 and 1615, Anstruther once again served as a mediator for Christian IV and James VI, when he settled Christian's disputes with the city of Lübeck.

Sir John Throckmorton was Governor of Vlissingen. He mentioned Anstruther bringing news in April 1612 of the defeat of Christian IV in Sweden. Anstruther was passing through Vlissingen in March 1613, and they discussed the peace settlement mediated between Denmark and Sweden, the Älvsborg Ransom, and the return of Kalmar and Elsburg to Sweden. Throckmorton wrote to William Trumbull that Anstruther was "a very honest gentleman." Throckmorton met Anstruther at Vlissingen again on 16 February 1615 for an hour. Anstruther brought him a letter from Viscount Lisle, and was going to mediate in a dispute between the town of Lübeck and Christian IV. He spoke to Throckmorton again on 14 May, who took his letter for Lisle.

Anstruther was in London when Anne of Denmark was in her final illness in 1618, and he wrote to the Danish Chancellor, Christian Friis, perhaps to suggest that Christian IV might be her executor.

== Service during the Thirty Years' War, 1618-1644 ==
In 1618, the outbreak of the Thirty Years' War in Bohemia, saw the next phase of Anstruther's service begin. By 1620, Anstruther was James VI and I's main negotiator in Germany for a settlement on behalf of Frederick V and Elizabeth Stuart. By 1621, he was traveling between Denmark-Norway and the Dutch Republic, bringing Elizabeth nearly 20,000 pounds in compensation for her household goods and helping the broker the Hague Alliance between Denmark, the Republic, and Britain. The following year, Anstruther was a gentleman of the Privy Chamber and served as a translator for the Imperial Ambassador at the English Parliament. Between 1624 and 1625, Anstruther attempted to negotiate between Christian IV, Gustavus Adolphus of Sweden, John George I, Elector of Saxony, and the Lower Saxon Circle, but the Swedish plans were ultimately rejected and King James accepted Christian's plans. Although he continued as ambassador to Denmark-Norway after the coronation of Charles I, he left the Danish court in 1629 after the Treaty of Lübeck, finishing much of his residency from Hamburg.

In August 1630, Anstruther served as ambassador to the Diet of Regensburg, and was kindly received by Ferdinand II, Holy Roman Emperor. Although the Diet was dissolved, Anstruther managed to secure another meeting with Ferdinand, before returning to Scandinavia, believing that any further work in the Holy Roman Empire would be prejudicial to Stuart interests. In 1631, after a sojourn to London, Anstruther returned to Hamburg. En route he visited The Hague to discuss new proposals offered by Charles I. These centered on trying to get the Duke of Bavaria elected as Emperor, and although the Dutch expressed reservations, Anstruther attended the Diet of Allied Princes at Heilbronn. In 1633, he attended another diet of Protestant princes and continued negotiating in Germany through April 1635. However, the Peace of Prague (1635) largely undermined Stuart interests in Germany, and in 1638 he turned down an appointment to represent Britain in a meeting with Christian IV in Hamburg. This may have been due to the signing of the National Covenant and the outbreak of the Bishops' Wars in Scotland. He returned as an envoy to Denmark on behalf of both Charles I and the English parliament in 1641, and signed the Solemn League and Covenant in 1643. He died by late 1644 and was buried at Westminster Abbey on 9 January 1645.

== Anstruther and the art world ==
It is said that the painter and tapestry designer Francis Cleyn, who was in the service of Christian IV of Denmark, came to England in 1623 with Anstruther's recommendation to Prince Charles. The inventory of the art-works in the palaces of Charles I made by Abraham van der Doort records paintings brought home by Robert Anstruther. These include a picture of a family brought from Germany (in 1630) and a "Martyrdom of St Bartolomew" attributed by Van der Doort to the Carracci in the King's chair room at Whitehall. There was also a miniature of "A falconer with a white dog" by Princess Louise which Anstruther had brought from The Hague. Anstruther had dealings with Jonas Charisius, secretary to Christian IV, who bought paintings and musical instruments for the king in the Netherlands, sending him portraits of King James and the late Anna of Denmark in 1619.

== Anecdote about Robert Anstruther ==
A story was told that the King of Denmark placed his crown on the table as a wager in a drinking game. Anstruther won when the drunk king fell under the table. The courtiers crowned Anstruther and he proclaimed a set of new laws. On his next visit to Denmark, the king surprised him by calling him to the royal presence immediately while he was still in a "great amaze". The King got him drunk and found Anstrtuther's private instructions, and put him on a ship back to England. There the confused ambassador was confronted by King James.
