= Mary de Vere =

English noblewoman (c. 1554 – 1624)

- Baroness Willoughby de Eresby; Lady Hart
- Born: c. 1554
- Died: 24 June 1624 (aged 69–70)
- Noble family: de Vere
- Spouses: Peregrine Bertie, 13th Baron Willoughby de Eresby; Sir Eustace Hart
- Issue: Robert Bertie, 1st Earl of Lindsey; Peregrine Bertie; Henry Bertie; Katherine Bertie; Vere Bertie; Roger Bertie; An other Bertie son
- Father: John de Vere, 16th Earl of Oxford
- Mother: Margery Golding

Mary de Vere (c. 1554 – 24 June 1624) was a 16th-century English noblewoman. The daughter of John de Vere, 16th Earl of Oxford, and his second wife Margery Golding, she married Peregrine Bertie, 13th Baron Willoughby de Eresby. The couple lived with their seven children in Grimsthorpe Castle in Lincolnshire. Following Bertie's death, Lady Willoughby married Sir Eustace Hart. She died on about 24 June 1624.

== Early life and family ==
No records exist for the date or place of birth of Mary, second child of John de Vere and his second wife, Margery Golding. She was born in late 1554 at the earliest, according to Professor Alan H. Nelson, her brother's biographer. He notes there's no mention of a pregnancy or sibling to Edward in the codicil to her father's will dated 28 Jan 1554. Mary's birthplace might thus be Hedingham Castle, Veer House in London, or one of her father's ten additional vast Essex estates. Mary's half-uncle was Arthur Golding, a translator of the classics and John Calvin. Shakespeare relied on Golding's translation of Ovid's Metamorphosis as a frequent source for his long poems and plays. Mary's brother Edward de Vere, 17th Earl of Oxford, married Anne Cecil, daughter of William Cecil, Lord Burghley, and the translator Mildred Cooke.

On 31 August 1562, Mary's father died. Twelve-year-old Edward de Vere became the 17th Earl of Oxford and was moved into William Cecil's household. Mary was probably seven or younger and thus likely remained with her mother, Margery Golding, who soon married Sir Charles Tyrrel. Golding died in 1569.

== Marriages and issue ==
Mary was probably 21 when she accepted the proposal of Peregrine Bertie, 13th Baron Willoughby de Eresby. Two powerful women initially prevented the marriage: Queen Elizabeth and Bertie's mother, Katherine Brandon, Duchess of Suffolk. Their objection was Edward de Vere's abuse of his wife Anne Cecil.

Mary de Vere's two oldest sons with Peregrine Bertie were prominent men of their time. Robert Bertie (1583-1642) was the 1st Earl of Lindsey; her second son Peregrine (d 1640) was made a Knight of the Bath by James I in 1610. Katherine Bertie, the couple's only daughter, married Sir Lewis Watson, first Lord Rockingham. Relegated by the Dictionary of National Biography to the category "other children" are sons Henry, Vere, and Roger.

Peregrine Bertie died on 25 June 1601. He was buried at Spilsby, Lincolnshire, in accordance with his 7 August 1599 will. Katherine, Lady Watson's grave is nearby. She died during her first childbirth in 1610. The statue memorializing her in St James's church is more haunting than typical effigies of the time.

Before 2 June 1605, Mary, Lady Willoughby became the first wife of Sir Eustace Hart of London. She died in London on about 24 June 1624.
