= Brockley, Suffolk =

Village and civil parish in Suffolk, England

Coordinates: 52.1596°N 0.6682°E

Brockley
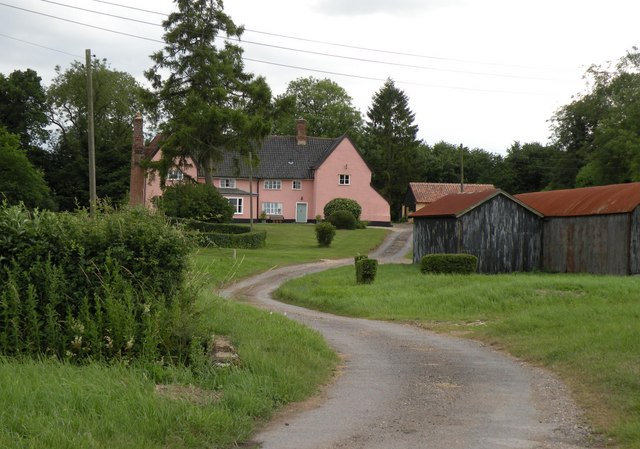
- Grade I listed Brockley Hall

- Location within Suffolk
- Population: 312 (2011 census)
- OS grid reference: TL8254
- District: West Suffolk
- Shire county: Suffolk
- Region: East
- Country: England
- Sovereign state: United Kingdom
- Post town: Bury St Edmunds
- Postcode district: IP29
- Dialling code: 01284

Brockley (not to be confused with Brockley Green, 8 miles (13 km) southwest in Hundon parish) is a village and civil parish in the West Suffolk district of Suffolk, England. Brockley parish includes the hamlets of Pound Green and Gulling Green. According to the 2001 Census, parish population was 281, and increased to 312 at the 2011 Census.

The village is situated roughly 7 miles (11 km) south of Bury St Edmunds and 9 miles (14 km) north of Sudbury on the B1066. It is also 2 miles (3 km) north of Hartest. A small hamlet is recorded in Domesday as "Brochola" or "Broclega": the name originates from 'woodland clearing by a brook'.

Mill Road marks the location of a former post mill which was demolished in 1930. East of B1066 is Willow Tree Farm (now Britton's Farm) (furthest out) with a small chapel (halfway to B1066). West of B1066 is Mile Farm (now Long's Farm) with the Pumping Station furthest west.

Brockley Hall and St Andrew's Church are still around 1 km north of the village. St Andrew's dates from medieval times, but was renovated in 1866. It is a Grade II* listed building. Brockley Hall is Grade I listed.

There have been no public houses in the village since the 1980s, although before then there were two: the Fox and Hounds and The Six Bells.

A blacksmith used to be next door to the pub. A shop, and petrol station closed some years ago.

Brockley Cricket Club started over 70 years ago and supports three teams playing in local leagues, a midweek team and a youth programme. The village also supports an indoor bowls club that has enjoyed some success in the past.
