= John de Vere, 16th Earl of Oxford =

English noble

John de Vere
- 16th Earl of Oxford
- Born: 1516
- Died: 3 August 1562 (aged 45–46); Oxford, Oxfordshire, England
- Buried: Castle Hedingham, Essex
- Noble family: de Vere
- Spouses: Dorothy Neville; Margery Golding
- Issue: Katherine, Baroness Windsor; Edward de Vere, 17th Earl of Oxford; Mary de Vere
- Father: John de Vere, 15th Earl of Oxford
- Mother: Elizabeth Trussell

John de Vere, 16th Earl of Oxford (1516 – 3 August 1562) was born to John de Vere, 15th Earl of Oxford, and Elizabeth Trussell, daughter of Edward Trussell. He was styled Lord Bolebec 1526 to 1540 before he succeeded to his father's title.

== Career ==
While never of consequence in the Tudor court, the 16th Earl's support for Queen Mary was instrumental in her accession to the throne in 1553, though he was given no preferment by her. During her reign he was active as the principal magnate in Essex. Under Mary, Essex men and women suspected of heresy against Catholicism were brought before Oxford to be charged, and thence conveyed to the Bishop of London for examination. Of his prisoners, at least sixteen were condemned and burnt, beginning with his former servant, Thomas Hawkes, who was burnt at Coggeshall on 10 June 1555. He was followed by Nicholas Chamberlain, William Bamford, and Thomas Ormond. On 28 April 1556, another six men charged by the earl were burnt at Colchester. A seventh, John Routh, was executed on 27 June. Five more prisoners indentured by the earl that year were released, but continued obstinate in their refusal of Catholic practices, and were re-arrested, condemned, and burnt at Colchester on 2 August 1557: William Bongeour, Helen Ewring, William Munt, his wife Alice Munt, and her daughter, Rose Allen.

== Family ==
He married firstly Dorothy Neville, daughter of Ralph Neville, 4th Earl of Westmorland in Holywell, Shoreditch, London on 3 July 1536, secondly and bigamiously Joan Jockey of Earls Colne at White Colne Church, and thirdly, Margery Golding in Belchamp St Paul on 1 August 1548.

Dorothy fled the marriage in about January 1546, citing "'the vnkynde [unkind] dealing of the earl'". In May of that year, de Vere bigamously married one of his mistresses, Joan Jockey of Earls Colne, at White Colne Church. Five men (including a knight and a lord) broke into Oxford's home while he was away and either cut Jockey's nose clean off or cut the "skin at the base of the nostrils into flaps to give her a permanently grotesque appearance", a traditional punishment for "unsocial behaviour". Though Joan Jockey survived the attack, the Earl definitively 'put her away'". In 1585, when attesting to the legitimacy of Oxford's marriage to Margery Golding, members of his household reported that "'all theise women were shaken off by the same Earle ... before the said lady Dorothie dyed'" on "about 6 January 1548, at a parsonage located a half mile from distant Salisbury."

His two marriages produced three children. With his first wife, Dorothy, (d. c. 6 January 1548), he had Katherine de Vere, who married Edward Windsor, 3rd Baron Windsor, "and Faith, who died in swaddling clothes". With Margery, he had a son, Edward de Vere, 17th Earl of Oxford, and a daughter, Mary de Vere. Margery died on 2 December 1568. After his death in Oxford, he was buried in Castle Hedingham, Essex, on 31 August 1562.

== Cultural pursuits ==
The Earl was known as a sportsman, and like several noblemen of his day, he retained a company of actors. The troupe, known as Oxford's Men, was retained by the Earl from 1547 until his death in 1562. His circle included the scholar and diplomat Sir Thomas Smith and his brothers-in-law, the poets Henry Howard, Earl of Surrey and Edmund Sheffield, 1st Baron Sheffield, and the translator Arthur Golding.

Peerage of England
Preceded by John de Vere	Earl of Oxford; 1540–1562	Succeeded by Edward de Vere
