= Greyfriars, London =

Franciscan friary in London

Coordinates: 51.5162°N 0.0996°W

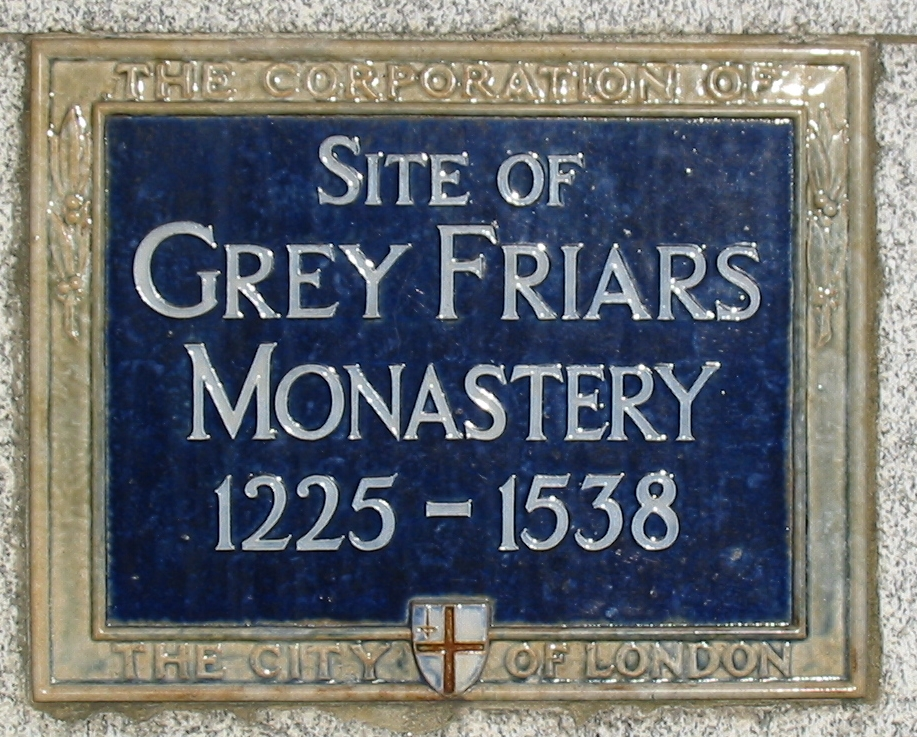
Blue plaque marking the site of the London Greyfriars

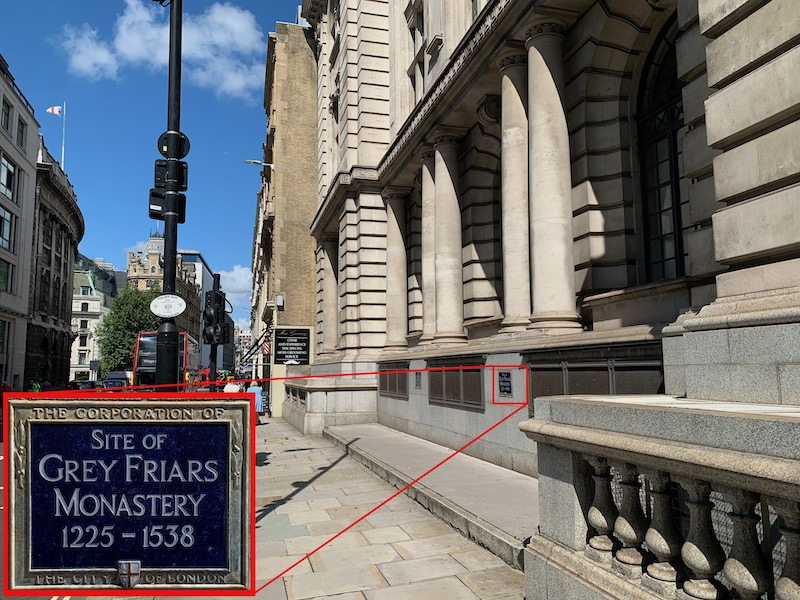
A blue plaque in Newgate Street marking the site of Greyfriars monastery

In London, the Greyfriars was a Conventual Franciscan friary that existed from 1225 to 1538 on a site at the North-West of the City of London by Newgate in the parish of St Nicholas in the Shambles. It was the second Franciscan religious house to be founded in the country. The establishment included a conventual church that was one of the largest in London, and a studium or regional university, with an extensive library of logical and theological texts. It was an important intellectual centre in the early fourteenth century, rivalled only by Oxford University in status. Members of the community at that time included William of Ockham, Walter Chatton and Adam Wodeham. It flourished in the fourteenth and fifteenth century but in the 16th century, it was dissolved at the instigation of Henry VIII as part of the Dissolution of the Monasteries of 1538. Christ's Hospital was founded in the old conventual buildings, and the church was rebuilt completely by Sir Christopher Wren as Christ Church Greyfriars after the original church was almost completely destroyed in the Great Fire of London of 1666, and Wren's church was ruined in the London bombing of World War II. A memorial garden occupies the ruins, and a building now stands on part of the priory, designed by Arup Group Limited, currently occupied by Merrill Lynch.

It was named after the friars' practice of wearing grey habits.

== History ==
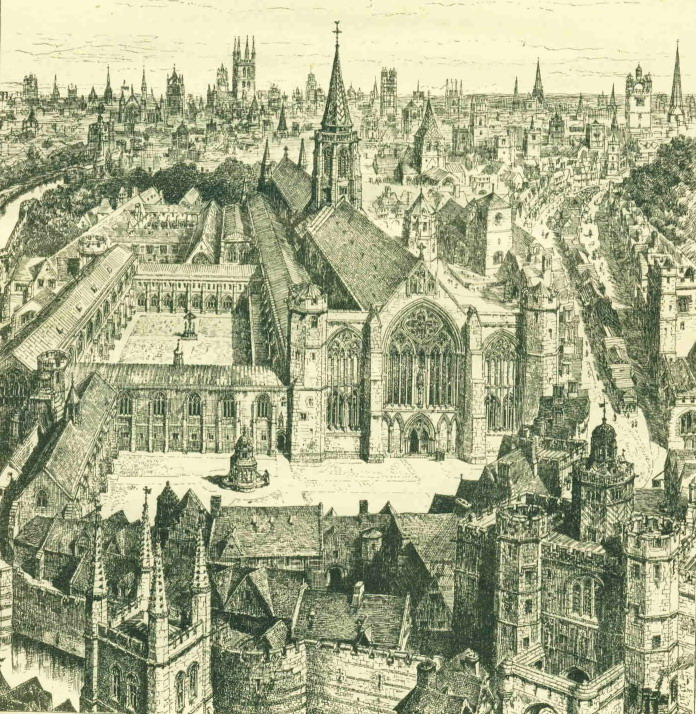
View of the Greyfriars looking east, as imagined by H.W. Brewer in 1895.

The Franciscan Order first arrived in England in September 1224, on the Tuesday after The Nativity of the Blessed Virgin. They settled in London in the summer of 1225, after John Iwyn, a wealthy businessman, bought a plot of land for them in the parish of St Nicholas in the Shambles (butchers' quarter). The land was just inside the city wall, which at that time was next to open country. Three years later, Joce Fitz Piers gave the Grey Friars his property in Stinking Lane. Over the next 130 years Londoners and others made 25 further donations of land to the friars, ending with Queen Isabella's donation of a tenement in 1353 or 1354. In 1229 King Henry III gave the Conventual Franciscans of London oak to build their house. By 1243 there were eighty friars in residence, and by 1258 they had extended the site on the North and Westside. The original church was built with money provided by William Joynier (mayor of London in 1239), who built the chapel and also gave two hundred pounds towards the cost of other buildings. Historian Charles Lethbridge Kingsford, who published the London Greyfriars' register and wrote a history of the site in the same volume, concludes from the sums of money spent on building work in this period that the friary would have been "of a modest kind".

Further work began on the church towards the end of the 13th century. Henry le Walleis (d. 1302), another mayor of London, is supposed to have built the nave, and given timber for the altars. In 1301–1302 Queen Margaret (Marguerite of France, born 1282, second wife of King Edward I) spent 60 marks on land in the parish of St Nicholas for the Grey Friars. The Choir was built on this site. She funded the construction of the church, spending 2,000 marks on the work before her death in 1318, at which point it was still unfinished. Queen Isabella, the wife of Edward II (r. 1327–1377), was responsible for completing the work, spending around £700. The total expenditure on the new church was about £2700, a huge sum.

There were six chapels within the church, eight other altars and many statues and images of saints (at least eight are documented, in addition to those in the chapels and on the altars). The church became a favourite burial place for those of high rank and status. Margaret was buried there, as was Isabella, widow of Edward II]; the heart of Eleanor of Provence, wife of Henry III, was buried there as well.

Built in the gothic style, it was completed in 1348, and was the second-largest in medieval London, measuring 300 feet (91 m) long by 89 feet (27 m) across. The monastery was dissolved in 1538 by Thomas Chapman, an agent of Thomas Cromwell. On 12 November the house signed a deed of surrender, probably composed by Chapman. The Friars were made to confess that "the perfeccion of Christian liuyng dothe not conciste in ... weryng of a grey cootte, disgeasing our selffe aftyr straunge fassions, dokynge, nodyngs and bekynge, in gurdyng our selffes wythe a gurdle full of knots, and other like Papisticall ceremonyes"

After the Surrender, some of the houses on the site were converted for private use, and the church was closed and used as a store-house for treasure looted from the French. In 1547, the king gave the church, the buildings called "le Fratrye," "le Librarye," "le Dorter," and "le Chapterhouse," and the ground called "le Great Cloyster," and "le Little Cloyster" to the City of London. The church, which had suffered damage and looting, now called Christ Church was to be the church of a new parish formed by joining St Nicholas and St Ewen. It was re-opened on 30 January 1547. It was destroyed by the Great Fire of London in 1666.

Christ's Hospital (Blue Coat School) was founded for orphans in some of the old friary buildings in 1553 by Edward VI. The school relocated to Horsham in West Sussex in 1902.

== Burials ==
- John Clinton, 6th Baron Clinton
- John Dynham, 1st Baron Dynham(c. 1433–1501)
- Elizabeth Barton (1506?–1534), executed Catholic nun
- Beatrice of England (1242–1275), was a Princess of England as the daughter of King Henry III of England and Eleanor of Provence
- Thomas Brandon (diplomat)
- William FitzWarin and his wife, Maria de Ergadia
- Francis Bigod, was the leader of Bigod's Rebellion.
- Elizabeth Bourchier (died 1557)
- Richard Hastings, Baron Welles
- Robert de Lisle, 1st Baron Lisle
- William Gage (15th-century landowner)
- Margaret de Vere
- John Devereux, 1st Baron Devereux
- John de Cobham, 2nd Baron Cobham (of Kent)
- John de Cobham, 3rd Baron Cobham
- Walter Blount, 1st Baron Mountjoy
- Sir William Blount (c.1442-1471)
- Edward Blount, 2nd Baron Mountjoy
- John Blount, 3rd Baron Mountjoy
- James Blount
- Robert de Lisle, 1st Baron Lisle
- Sir Ralph de Spigurnell, Admiral of the Fleets
- Eleanor Percy, Duchess of Buckingham
- Walter de Beauchamp (Steward to Edward I)

== Buildings ==
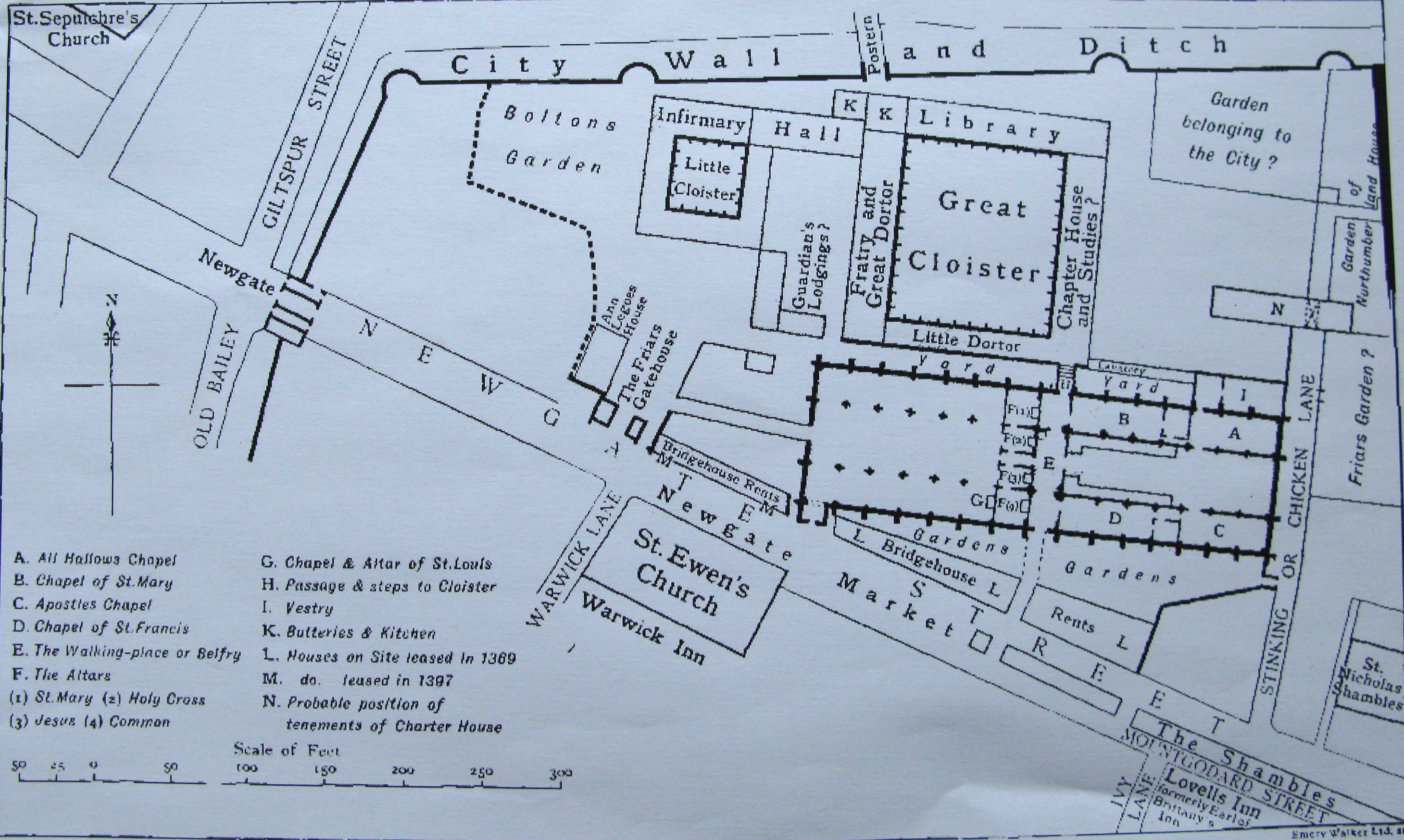
Plan of the Greyfriars in the early 16th century

- Arup plan
