= William Joynier =

Sheriff of the City of London

Sir William Joynier

Mayor of London
- In office 1239–1240
- Preceded by: Richard Renger
- Succeeded by: Gerard Bat

Sheriff of the City of London and Middlesex
- In office 1222–1223
- Preceded by: Thomas Lambert
- Succeeded by: John Travers

Personal details
- Died: c. 1248
- Occupation: Merchant, Banker

Sir William Joynier was a rich 13th-century merchant and Sheriff of the City of London who served as Mayor of London from 1239 to 1240.

== Biography ==
In 1204 Joynier was instructed to investigate the condition of Newgate Prison and Holborn Bridge and authorise repairs. He was able to make loans to Henry III from a young age. From 1219, Joynier supplied the royal household with luxury goods and built an extensive trading network that extended from Scotland and Ireland to Poitou.

Joynier was made Sheriff of the City of London in 1223. He was subsequently elected to serve as 12th Mayor of London between 1239 and 1240.

Joynier's relationship with the monarch was not always an easy one. The fine rolls of Henry III for 1224 contain an order for Joynier's arrest in order to recover possessions given to Joynier by the disgraced Falkes de Breauté. Joynier had a more serious conflict with Henry in 1239 when, whilst serving as Mayor, he defended the city's privileges and refused to admit Simon FitzMary, appointed by the king without election. However, these incidents did not deter Joynier's trade with the royal household or relationship with the court. Joynier supplied wine to the king in 1241 and was appointed as one of the custodians of the royal treasure in the Tower of London in 1242.

Apart from banking and trade, Joynier also had income from estates in Middlesex and Cambridgeshire. He also had a number of tenements in the city in Cheapside, All Hallows Honey Lane and St. Mary Magdalen, Milk Street

Joynier used some of his wealth to pay for the entire construction of the Greyfriars chapel and contributed two hundred pounds towards construction of other monastic buildings on the site in Saint Nicholas in the Shambles. Joynier's support for the Friars spanned the latter two decades of his life.

Joynier died in about 1248.

Civic offices
Preceded by Richard Renger; Thomas Lambert	Sheriff of London; 1223; With: Thomas Lambert	Succeeded by John Travers; Andrew Bokerel
Preceded by Richard Renger (6th term)	Mayor of London; 1239–1240	Succeeded by Gerard Bat
