= John Plantagenet =

John Plantagenet may refer to any John who was a descendant of Geoffrey Plantagenet, Count of Anjou:

- John, King of England
- John of Lancaster, 1st Duke of Bedford
- John, 3rd Earl of Kent
- John of Gloucester
