= John Blount, 3rd Baron Mountjoy =

English peer and soldier (c. 1450–1485)

- Born: c. 1450
- Died: 12 October 1485
- Spouse: Lora Berkeley
- Issue: William Blount, 4th Baron Mountjoy; Rowland Blount; Lora Blount; Constance Blount
- Father: Walter Blount, 1st Baron Mountjoy
- Mother: Ellen Byron

John Blount, 3rd Baron Mountjoy (c. 1450 – 12 October 1485) was an English peer and soldier.

== Life ==
John Blount was born circa 1450 in Rock, Worcestershire, the second son of Walter Blount, 1st Baron Mountjoy, by his first wife, Helena Byron, the daughter of Sir John Byron of Clayton, Lancashire.

== Career ==
Blount was appointed Lieutenant of Hammes in the Pale of Calais on 6 April 1470. Blount's father died on 1 August 1474, and was buried at the Greyfriars, London. His eldest son and heir, William Blount, had died of wounds received at the Battle of Barnet on 14 April 1471, and William's underage son, Edward, succeeded as 2nd Baron Mountjoy. When Edward died without male issue on 1 December 1476, John Blount inherited the barony as the next male heir.

Mountjoy was knighted in January 1478 at the marriage of Edward IV's young son, Richard of Shrewsbury, 1st Duke of York. When Richard III became King, he appointed Mountjoy Constable of Guînes, after which time, according to Horrox, Mountjoy 'left Hammes to his younger brother, James, who had been granted the office jointly with him in May 1476'.

By 14 August 1484 Mountjoy was gravely ill, and Sir Thomas Montgomery, who later married Mountjoy's widow, was authorized to act as his deputy at Guînes, while Mountjoy's brother, James Blount, took over as captain of Hammes. A tense, even dramatic confrontation then unfolded within the Pale, with John Blount only nominally in command.

In 1484, James Blount became disaffected from Richard, and a supporter of Henry of Richmond, the future King Henry VII. This became apparent to King Richard when, later that year, he ordered the return to England of John de Vere, 13th Earl of Oxford, who had been held prisoner at Hammes for nearly a decade. Thomas Montgomery, who was deputizing for Mountjoy, also went over to Henry's side.

James Blount had taken Oxford to Henry's court, and in December an attack was mounted on Hammes by John Dynham, 1st Baron Dynham, captain of Calais. In January 1485 Oxford, with Thomas Brandon, successfully evacuated the force from Hammes, including Blount's wife, and his brother, James Blount, and they joined Henry.

Richard, seeing the affinity of William Hastings, 1st Baron Hastings (died 1483) falling away, negotiated inconsistently, with offers of pardons mixed with confiscations, and John of Gloucester was brought in over Dynham. James Blount and others were with Henry when he invaded England and became King after defeating Richard III at the Battle of Bosworth.

Mountjoy made his will on 6 October 1485, bequeathing to his second son, Rowland Blount, a chain of gold with a gold lion set with diamonds, and to his daughter, Constance, £100 for her marriage portion. He instructed his two sons to "live rightwisely and never to take the state of baron upon them if they may leave it from them, nor to desire to be great about princes for it is dangerous". He died six days later, on 12 October.

In 1488, the wardship of his eldest son and heir, William Blount, 4th Baron Mountjoy, was granted to his brother, James (d. 1492), third son of Walter Blount, 1st Baron Mountjoy.

== Marriage and issue ==
Mountjoy married, about 1477, Lora Berkeley (d. 1501), the daughter of Edward Berkeley (d. March 1506) of Beverston Castle, Gloucestershire, son of Sir Maurice de Berkeley by his wife Lora FitzHugh, and Christian Holt (d. 1468), second daughter and coheir of Richard Holt, esquire, by whom he had two sons and two daughters:

- William Blount, 4th Baron Mountjoy.
- Rowland Blount, who died in 1509 without issue.
- Lora Blount (d. 1480)
- Constance Blount, who married Sir Thomas Tyrrell of Heron in East Horndon, Essex, son of Sir Thomas Tyrrell of Heron (d. 1512), by whom she was the mother of John Tyrrell (d. 1540), esquire, Sir Henry Tyrrell (d. 20 May 1588), Sir William Tyrrell, Thomas Tyrrell, Charles Tyrrell and George Tyrrell.

After Mountjoy's death, his widow, Lora (née Berkeley), married secondly, in 1485, Sir Thomas Montgomery (d. 2 January 1495) of Faulkbourne, Essex, by whom she had no issue, and thirdly Thomas Butler, 7th Earl of Ormond, by whom she had a daughter, Elizabeth Butler. Lora (née Berkeley) was buried in New Abbey, London, with her second husband.

== Notes ==
Peerage of England
| Preceded by Edward Blount | Baron Mountjoy; 1474–1485 | Succeeded by William Blount |
