= James Blount (English soldier) =

English soldier (??–1493)

Sir James Blount (died 1493) (sometimes spelt Blunt) was commander of the English fortress of Hammes, near Calais.

Blount was the son of Walter Blount, 1st Baron Mountjoy, and uncle of William Blount, 4th Baron Mountjoy. In 1473, he sat in Parliament as the MP for Derbyshire.

He was appointed governor of Hammes jointly with his elder brother John Blount, 3rd Baron Mountjoy in 1476. When, in 1484, the Earl of Oxford and Viscount Beaumont, were imprisoned at Hammes, Blount was apparently persuaded to switch to the Lancastrian side. Blount, Oxford, and Beaumont fled to join Henry Tudor, (the future Henry VII of England who was then living in exile in France). Blount remained with the Lancastrian forces and landed with Henry Tudor's forces in 1485 at Milford Haven, where he was knighted.

Blount appears as a minor character in William Shakespeare's play Richard III.
