= Baron Mountjoy =

Barony in the Peerage of Great Britain

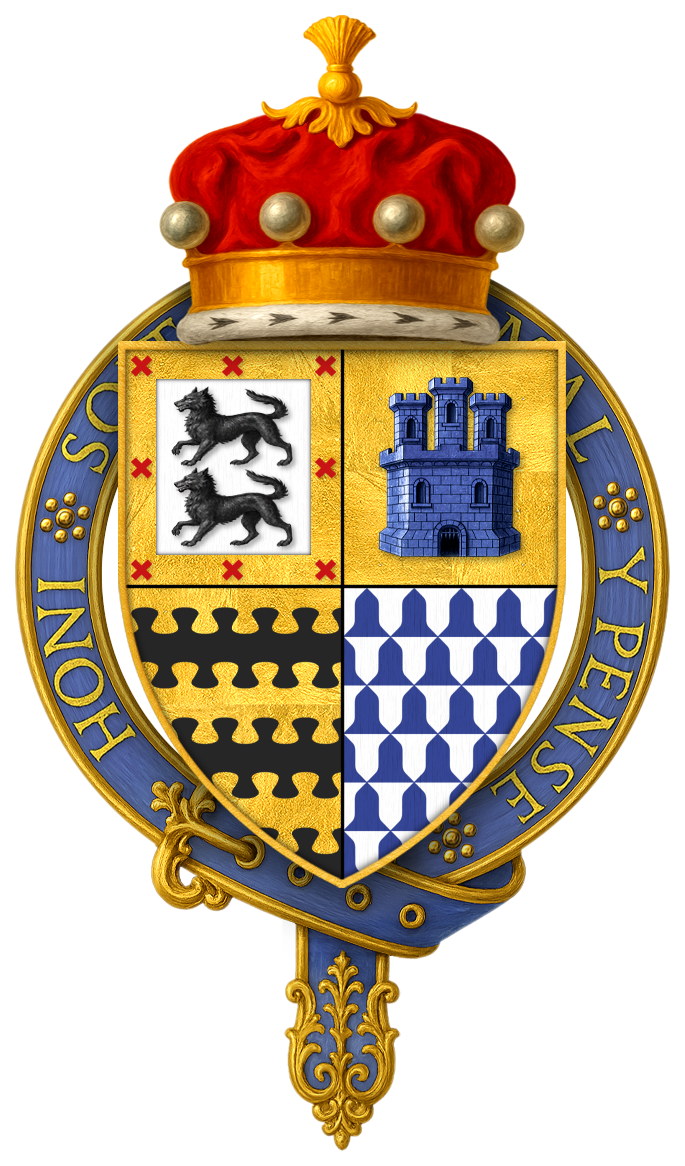
Coat of Arms of 1st Baron Mountjoy (1465)

The titles of Baron Mountjoy and Viscount Mountjoy have been created several times for members of various families, including the Blounts and their descendants and the Stewarts of Ramelton and their descendants.

The first creation was for Walter Blount of Hertfordshire, who was summoned to Parliament as Baron Mountjoy in the Peerage of England during 1465. The Blounts were a junior part of the family Blount of Sodington of Worcestershire. The first Baron was the great-grandson of Sir John Blount of Sodington and Isolda Mountjoy, and the grandson of Sir Walter Blount, bearer of the Royal Standard of Henry IV at the Battle of Shrewsbury during 1403 where he was slain. This creation is one of the earliest examples of a baronial title not being related to land ownership or a pre-existing dignity.

The 8th Baron Mountjoy was created Earl of Devonshire during 1603 and died without legitimate issue during 1606, when the earldom and the barony became extinct. His son Mountjoy Blount, who had been born before his parents' marriage, was created Baron Mountjoy of Mountjoy Fort in the Peerage of Ireland during 1618, Baron Mountjoy of Thurveston in the Peerage of England during 1627 and Earl of Newport in the Peerage of England during 1628. All these titles became extinct with the death of the 3rd Earl of Newport in 1681.

Elizabeth Blount, sister of the 2nd Baron Mountjoy of the 1465 creation, had married the 1st Baron Windsor, and their descendant Thomas Windsor, 1st Viscount Windsor in the Peerage of Ireland and younger son of the 7th Baron Windsor and 1st Earl of Plymouth, was created Baron Mountjoy in the Peerage of Great Britain during 1712. This title became extinct on the death of his son the 2nd Viscount Windsor in 1758.

Luke Gardiner (1745–1798), was created Baron Mountjoy during 1789 and Viscount Mountjoy during 1795, both part of the peerage of Ireland.

Another title of Viscount Mountjoy was created (and it is still extant) in 1796 for the first Marquess of Bute who married the granddaughter of the 2nd Viscount Windsor and Baron Mountjoy.

== Barons Mountjoy (1465) ==
- Walter Blount, 1st Baron Mountjoy (1420–1474)
- Edward Blount, 2nd Baron Mountjoy (1467–1475)
- John Blount, 3rd Baron Mountjoy (1445–1485)
- William Blount, 4th Baron Mountjoy (1478–1534)
- Charles Blount, 5th Baron Mountjoy (1516–1544)
- James Blount, 6th Baron Mountjoy (1533–1581)
- William Blount, 7th Baron Mountjoy (1561–1594)
- Charles Blount, 8th Baron Mountjoy (1562–1606), created Earl of Devonshire in 1603.

== Barons Mountjoy of Mountjoy Fort (1618) and Mountjoy of Thurveston (1627) ==
- Mountjoy Blount, 1st Baron Mountjoy (1597–1665), created Earl of Newport during 1628.
- see Earl of Newport.

== Barons Mountjoy (1712) ==
- see Viscount Windsor.

== Barons Mountjoy (1789) ==
- Luke Gardiner, 1st Baron Mountjoy (1745–1798), was created Baron Mountjoy during 1789 and Viscount Mountjoy during 1795, both part of the peerage of Ireland.
- see Viscount Mountjoy.

== See also ==
- Earl of Blessington
- Earl of Newport
- Viscount Mountjoy
