= Walter Blount, 1st Baron Mountjoy =

English politician (c.1416–1474)

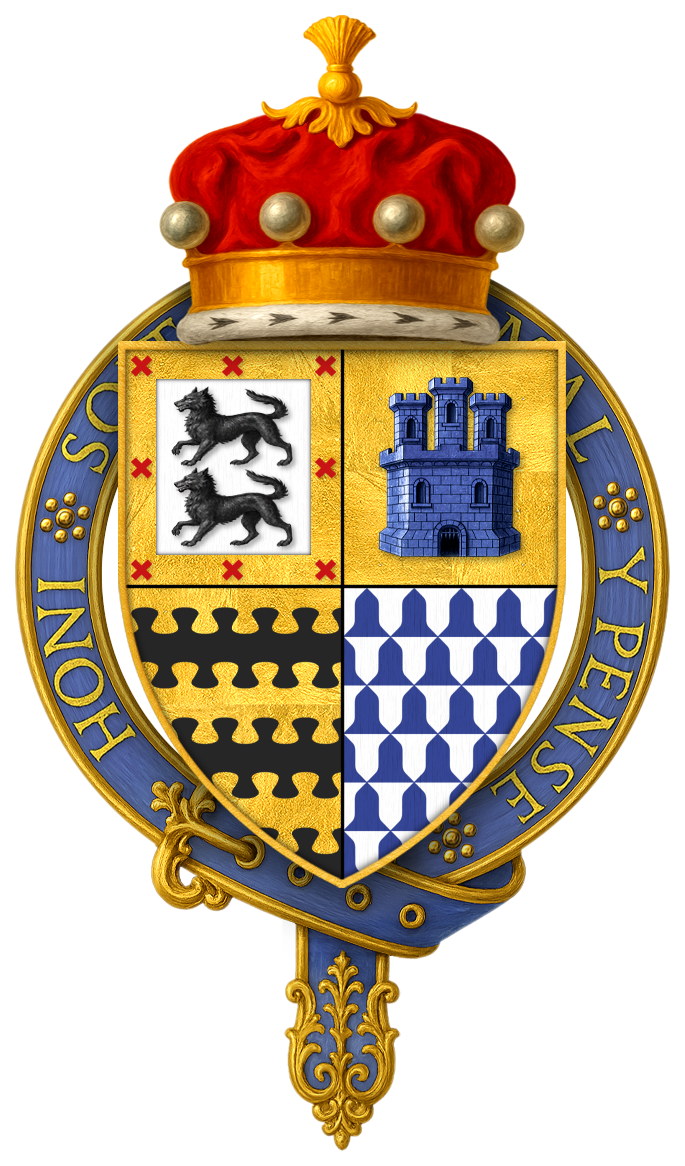
Arms of Sir Walter Blount, 1st Baron Mountjoy, KG: Quarterly, 1st: Argent, two wolves passant sable on a bordure of the first eight saltires gules (Ayala); 2nd: Or, a tower azure (Mountjoy); 3rd: Barry undé or and sable (Blount); 4th: Vair (Gresley).

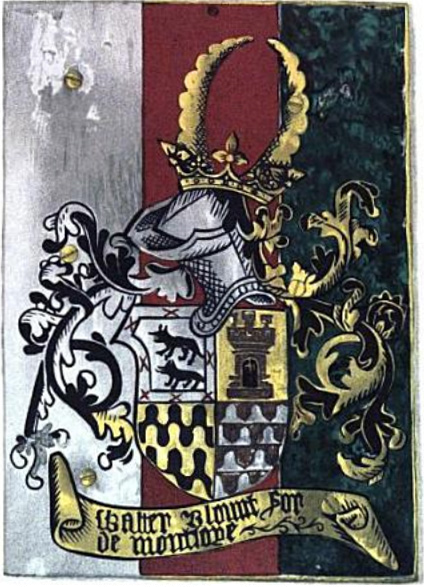
Garter stall plate of Walter Blount, 1st Baron Mountjoy, KG, St George's Chapel, Windsor Castle

Walter Blount, 1st Baron Mountjoy, KG (c. 1416 – 1 August 1474) was an English politician.

== Early life and family ==
Walter Blount was born about 1416, the eldest son of Sir Thomas Blount (1378–1456) and Margery Gresley, and grandson of Sir Walter Blount.

== Career ==
He was made Steward of the High Peak in Derbyshire and became a bitter rival of the local Vernon and Longford families, replacing the Vernons in parliament as the near-permanent Knight of the Shire (1447, Feb. 1449, 1450–51, 1453–54, 1455–56, 1460–61) for Derbyshire. He succeeded his father, Sir Thomas Blount, as Treasurer of Calais in 1460, becoming governor a year later as a reward for service rendered to King Edward IV at the Battle of Towton. Edward conferred on him in 1467 rich estates in Devon forfeited by the Earl of Devon; and in 1465 Blount was made lord high treasurer and created Baron Mountjoy. This creation is noteworthy as one of the earliest examples of a baronial title not being of a territorial character, nor the title of a dignity already existing. Blount's great-grandfather had married Isolda, daughter and heiress of Sir Thomas de Mountjoy, and the title was probably chosen to commemorate this alliance.

He was made a Knight of the Garter in 1472.

On his death on 1 August 1474 in Greyfriars, London, his grandson Edward Blount, 2nd Baron Mountjoy inherited his title. His eldest son (and Edward's father) Sir William Blount had been killed at the Battle of Barnet in 1471.

== Marriages and children ==
Mountjoy married firstly Helena Byron, the daughter of John Byron (died 1450), Lancashire, by whom he had four sons and two daughters.

- William Blount, eldest son and heir, who died in 1471 of wounds received at the Battle of Barnet.
- John Blount, 3rd Baron Mountjoy, second son.
- James Blount, third son.
- Edward Blount.
- Anne Blount.
- Elizabeth Blount.

By November 1467 Mountjoy married secondly Anne (née Neville), widow of Humphrey Stafford, 1st Duke of Buckingham (d. 1460), and daughter of Ralph Neville, 1st Earl of Westmorland.

== Notes ==
Political offices
Preceded by Edmund Grey	Lord High Treasurer; 1464–1465	Succeeded by Richard Woodville
Peerage of England
New title	Baron Mountjoy; 1465–1474	Succeeded by Edward Blount
