= Walter Blount (soldier) =

English soldier

Sir Walter Blount (circa 1348 – 21 July 1403), was a soldier and supporter of John of Gaunt, Duke of Lancaster. He later supported John's son and heir Henry Bolingbroke in his bid to become King Henry IV and in later battles against his enemies. At the Battle of Shrewsbury he served as the royal standard-bearer, was mistaken for the king and killed in combat.

He appears as a character in Shakespeare's play Henry IV, Part 1, in which he epitomises selfless loyalty and chivalry. Writer John Irving is a direct descendant of Blount.

== Early life ==
Walter Blount was the third son of Sir John Blount of Sodington, by his first wife, Iseult Mountjoy, and was a child at the death of his father in 1358 (his eldest brother Richard, the heir, was aged 13).

In 1367 Blount participated in Edward, the Black Prince's expedition to restore Peter of Castile to the throne of Leon and Castile. This expedition was terminated by the Battle of Nájera in 1367, which led to Peter's brief restoration, but also resulted in the fracturing of his English alliance. Blount returned to England.

Blount became a member of the household of John of Gaunt by 1372, and married by 1374 to Sancha de Ayala, the daughter of Diego Gómez, a high royal official in Toledo under the Castilian regime, by his wife, Inez de Ayala, sister of chancellor Pero López de Ayala. Sancha had come to England in 1371 as a lady-in-waiting to Constance, the elder daughter of Peter of Castile, whom John of Gaunt had married in 1372.

== Estate ==
In 1374 Sir Walter Blount's brother John, who had succeeded his mother Iseult (Isolde) Mountjoy in the Mountjoy property, made over to Walter the Mountjoy estates in Derbyshire, and to them Walter added by purchase, in 1381, the great estates of the Bakepuiz family in Derbyshire, Leicestershire, and Hertfordshire.

== Return to Castile ==
Blount probably returned to Castile in 1386. Permission had been granted Blount in 1377 to proceed with Duke John of Gaunt to Castile in order to assert the duke's right by virtue of his marriage to the throne of Leon and Castile; but the expedition did not start till 1386. On 17 April 1393 he, with Henry Bowet and another, was appointed to negotiate a permanent peace with the king of Castile.

In 1398 Duke John granted to Blount and his wife, with the king's approval, an annuity of 100 marks in consideration of their labours in his service. Blount was an executor of John of Gaunt, who died early in 1399, and received a small legacy.

== Later career and death ==
He represented Derbyshire in Henry IV's first parliament, which met on 6 Oct 1399. When the rebellion of the Percys broke out, Blount supported the King. At the Battle of Shrewsbury (21 July 1403) he was the king's standard-bearer. In the decisive struggle of the battle, the rebel leader Henry Percy attempted to break the royal army by a direct attack on the King. In the struggle Blount was killed by Archibald Douglas, 4th Earl of Douglas, one of the most powerful and feared noblemen of Scotland, and a privileged hostage in Percy's entourage, following his earlier capture at Homildon Hill. According to later chronicles, Blount was dressed in armour resembling that worn by Henry IV, and was mistaken by Douglas for the king.

He was buried in the church St. Mary 'of Newark', Leicester. His widow Sancha survived him until 1418. In 1406 she founded the hospital of St. Leonards, situated between Alkmonton and Hungry-Bentley, Derbyshire.

== Eulogised in Shakespeare's Henry IV ==
William Shakespeare gives Blount, whom he calls "Sir Walter Blunt", a prominent place in the first part of his Henry IV plays, and portrays both Hotspur and Henry IV eulogising his military prowess and manly character. In the play he deliberately misidentifies himself as the King in order to draw the attack onto himself. John Falstaff, finding his body, undercuts the eulogies by presenting his death as proof of the uselessness of "honour".

== Descendants ==
Sir Walter Blount's will, made 16 Dec 1401, named: his wife; sons John, Thomas, and James; and daughters Constance and Anne Griffith.

Sir John Blount was at one time governor of Calais; was besieged in a castle of Aquitaine by a great French army, which he defeated with a small force (Walsingham, Ypodigma Neustriæ, Rolls Ser., p. 437); was created knight of the Garter in 1413; and was present at the siege of Rouen in 1418: Sir John died without male issue.

Sir Thomas Blount was Treasurer of Calais during Henry VI's wars in France (Stevenson's Letters, &c., illustrating the wars in France temp. Henry VI, Rolls Ser., ii. passim), and founded a chantry at Newark in 1422 (at the expense of the Duke of Exeter) in memory of his father and mother. Sir Thomas was the father (by Margaret, daughter of Sir Thomas Gresley of Gresley, Derbyshire) of Sir Walter Blount, 1st Baron Mountjoy.

James Blount was the ancestor of the Blounts of Grendon, Orleton, and other places in Herefordshire. (Croke, Vol. II, Book III, p. 196.)

Peter Blount, named as Sancha and Walter's son in a genealogy written by her uncle (Dacosta, 175)

Walter Blount, died young, named as Sancha and Walter's son in a genealogy written by her uncle (Dacosta, 175)

Constance Blount married John de Sutton V of Dudley Castle, Staffordshire. They were the parents of John Sutton, 1st Baron Dudley.

Anne Blount married Thomas Griffith, Esq., of Wichnor (in Tatenhill), Staffordshire. (Croke, Vol. II, Book III, p. 196.)

== Sources ==
G. E. Cokayne, The Complete Peerage, vol. IX, pp. 331–333

Burke, Sir Bernard, "A Genealogical History of the Dormant, Abeyant, Forfeited, and Extinct Peerages of the British Empire," New Edition, pp. 54–55, https://archive.org/details/agenealogicalhi00burkgoog/page/n74

"Blount, Walter (d.1403)" . Dictionary of National Biography. London: Smith, Elder & Co. 1885–1900.
