= John de Vere, 14th Earl of Oxford =

English peer and landowner (1499–1526)

John de Vere
- 14th Earl of Oxford
- Born: 14 August 1499; Essex, England
- Died: 14 July 1526 (aged 26); Essex, England
- Noble family: de Vere
- Spouse: Anne Howard
- Issue Detail: Elizabeth de Vere
- Father: Sir George Vere
- Mother: Margaret Stafford

John de Vere, 14th Earl of Oxford (14 August 1499 – 14 July 1526) was an English peer and landowner.

By inheritance, he was Lord Great Chamberlain of England, and in June 1520, at the age of twenty, he attended King Henry VIII at the Field of the Cloth of Gold.

The young earl was considered a wastrel: in 1523 the king ordered him to moderate his hunting, to eat and drink less, to give up late nights, and to be less extravagant in his dress.

He died at the age of 26.

== Family ==
John de Vere, born 14 August 1499, was the second but only surviving son of Sir George Vere and his second wife, Margaret, the daughter of Sir William Stafford of Bishop's Frome in Herefordshire by Elizabeth Wrottesley, daughter of Hugh Wrottesley, esquire. Sir George Vere had been intended for the priesthood, and in 1459, when he was only sixteen, his father, John de Vere, 12th Earl of Oxford, appointed him to a benefice in Lavenham, Suffolk. However both the 12th Earl and his eldest son and heir, Aubrey de Vere, were executed in February 1462, and George then became second in line to the earldom as the potential heir to his brother, John de Vere, 13th Earl of Oxford. Instead of George, his younger brother, Richard, became a priest, and in 1459 George married, as his first wife, Margaret Talbot (d. December 1472), the sister and coheir of Thomas Talbot, 2nd Viscount Lisle (d. March 1470). He fought at the Battle of Barnet on 14 April 1471, and was with his elder brother, John de Vere, 13th Earl of Oxford, when he seized St. Michael's Mount in Cornwall on 30 September 1473. Sir George Vere was attainted in Parliament in early 1475, together with his brothers, John and Thomas. Ross states that Sir George Vere was never officially pardoned, although Richardson states that his attainder was reversed when King Henry VII came to the throne in 1485.

By his father's second marriage to Margaret Stafford, John de Vere had four sisters:

- Elizabeth, who married Sir Anthony Wingfield (born before 1488, died 15 August 1552) of Letheringham, Suffolk, by whom she had eight sons and seven daughters.
- Margaret, about whom nothing further is known.
- Dorothy (died 1527), who married John Neville, 3rd Baron Latimer (1493–1543), by whom she had a son, John Neville, 4th Baron Latimer (died 1577), and a daughter, Margaret Neville (died 1545). After Dorothy's death her husband married secondly, Elizabeth, the daughter of Sir Edward Musgrave, and thirdly, Katherine Parr (1512–1548), who after Baron Latimer's death became the sixth and last wife of King Henry VIII.
- Ursula (died 1558), who married firstly, George Windsor (died before 1520), eldest son and heir apparent of Andrew Windsor, 1st Baron Windsor (died 1543), and secondly, Sir Edmund Knightley (died 1542), but had no issue.

== Career ==
Sir George Vere died in 1503, leaving a will dated 21 August 1500 which was proved on 3 April 1503. At his father's death John de Vere, who was then a child of four, became a royal ward.

In 1513, de Vere inherited the estates and honours of his uncle, John de Vere, 13th Earl of Oxford, who had died at Hedingham Castle on 10 March 1513.

On 22 April, he was the chief mourner at his uncle's impressive funeral, at which nine hundred black gowns were given out to the mourners in attendance. The 13th Earl of Oxford was buried at Colne Priory, and at the burial ceremony 'A mounted knight, armed with an axe, was led into the choir by two knights and delivered the axe to the bishop, who gave it to the heir'.

When John de Vere was only twelve years of age, the 13th Earl had married his nephew and heir presumptive to Anne Howard, a daughter of Thomas Howard, 2nd Duke of Norfolk, by his second wife, Agnes Tilney, a marriage which served the purpose of uniting the families of the two greatest magnates in East Anglia.

The marriage settlement was dated 16 November 1511 and the ceremony took place before 1 May 1512. Although the marriage settlement itself does not survive, evidence of its provisions is found in the 13th Earl's will.

On 29 May 1514, Henry VIII, in the exercise of his royal prerogative, treated de Vere's marriage as technically invalid on the grounds that de Vere had been under the age of fourteen at the date of the marriage.

As was his prerogative right as king, he offered to de Vere, who by then had succeeded as the 14th Earl and become a royal ward, Margaret Courtenay as a bride.

De Vere refused Margaret. The King then granted both de Vere's future marriage and the fine imposed on him for his rejection of Margaret Courtenay to de Vere's father-in-law, Norfolk. At the same time, the King granted to Norfolk, during the 14th Earl's minority, custody of the Earl's lands, as well as the reversion of lands held in dower by the 13th Earl's widow, the Dowager Countess Elizabeth, and the offices of Lord Great Chamberlain of England, Steward of the Forest of Essex, and Constable of Colchester Castle.

The 14th Earl attended Henry VIII at the Field of the Cloth of Gold in June 1520, where he was one of the judges of the foot races. Two month later, on 16 August 1520, he came of age and was granted livery of his lands. In 1522, he was in attendance when King Henry met the Emperor Charles V between Dover and Canterbury.

His modern biographer, James Ross, considers the 14th Earl "an incompetent wastrel". In 1523, when he was twenty-four years of age, the King commanded him, through Cardinal Wolsey, to discharge his household and live with his father-in-law, the Duke of Norfolk, and demean himself lovingly towards his wife. He was restricted to a household of only twenty men and women, was not allowed to grant any offices or annuities, and was ordered to "moderate his excessive hunting, drink less wine, not stay up late, eat less meat, and forbear excessive and superfluous apparel".

Nonetheless, the Earl was at court in 1525 and 1526, officiating in June 1525 when the King's illegitimate son, Henry FitzRoy, was created Earl of Nottingham and witnessing the charter for the creation of Wolsey's college, Cardinal College, on 5 May 1526.

The 14th Earl died on 14 July 1526, aged twenty-six, and was buried in Colne Priory at Earls Colne in Essex. No trace of his tomb remains. At his death, his office of Lord Great Chamberlain reverted to the crown, as did the Barony of Plaiz.

The 14th Earl left no issue and was succeeded by his second cousin, John de Vere, 15th Earl of Oxford. Both were great-grandsons of Richard de Vere, 11th Earl of Oxford.

After the 14th Earl's death, his widow complained to both Cardinal Wolsey and to her brother, Thomas Howard, 3rd Duke of Norfolk, about the 15th Earl's conduct towards her. On 11 August 1526, she wrote to Wolsey alleging that the 15th Earl, Sir John Raynsford and their men had on two occasions broken into the park at Lavenham and killed more than one hundred deer. On 22 August, she wrote to her brother complaining that the new Earl continued to retain possession of Castle Camps. The Dowager Countess was back in possession during the years 1530–34, when she sent several letters to Thomas Cromwell from Castle Camps, in one of which she complained of a certain Alexander Irlam, parson of Belchamp Otten, "who in my lord my husband's time convented with other to have poisoned me".

The 14th Earl’s widow, Anne Howard, survived him for 32 years, dying before 22 February 1558/59, when she was buried in the Howard chapel in the Church of St Mary-at-Lambeth.

The 14th Earl of Oxford is said to have been referred to as "Little John of Campes" because of his diminutive stature. According to Cokayne, however, "it is much more likely that he was so called because he was a child, and that the other story was invented to account for the nickname".

== Notes ==
Political offices
Preceded by John de Vere	Lord Great Chamberlain; 1513–1526	Succeeded by John de Vere
Peerage of England
Preceded by John de Vere	Earl of Oxford; 1513–1526	Succeeded by John de Vere
