= John de Vere, 13th Earl of Oxford =

English noble and soldier (1442–1513)

The Right Honourable The Earl of Oxford KG KB
- Tenure: 26 February 1462 – 1475; 1485 – 10 March 1513
- Predecessor: John de Vere, 12th Earl
- Successor: John de Vere, 14th Earl
- Born: 8 September 1442
- Died: 10 March 1513 (aged 70); Castle Hedingham, Essex
- Noble family: de Vere
- Spouses: Margaret Neville; Elizabeth Scrope
- Issue: Katherine de Vere (illegitimate)
- Father: John de Vere, 12th Earl of Oxford
- Mother: Elizabeth Howard

John de Vere, 13th Earl of Oxford, KG, KB (8 September 1442 – 10 March 1513), the second son of John de Vere, 12th Earl of Oxford, and Elizabeth Howard, a first cousin of John Howard, 1st Duke of Norfolk (2nd creation), was one of the principal Lancastrian commanders during the English Wars of the Roses.

He was the principal commander of King Henry VII's army at the Battle of Bosworth Field, and again led Henry's troops to victory at the Battle of Stoke Field two years later. He became one of the great men of the King's regime.

== Early life ==
John de Vere, 13th Earl of Oxford, was born on 8 September 1442, the second son of John de Vere, 12th Earl of Oxford (23 April 1408 – 26 February 1462), and his wife Elizabeth Howard (c. 1410–1474), the daughter of Sir John Howard and Joan Walton.

In February 1462 the 12th Earl, his eldest son, Aubrey de Vere, and Sir Thomas Tuddenham, the 12th Earl's former political opponent in Norfolk and now a fellow Lancastrian loyalist, were convicted of high treason before John Tiptoft, 1st Earl of Worcester, Constable of England, for plotting against King Edward IV. The 12th Earl was beheaded on Tower Hill on 26 February 1462, and buried in the church of Austin Friars, London. His son Aubrey had been beheaded on the same scaffold six days earlier.

Pursuing a conciliatory policy with Lancastrian families, King Edward allowed John de Vere to succeed his father rather than attainting him, and on 18 January 1464 granted him licence to enter on his father's lands. On 26 May 1465 he was created a Knight of the Bath at the coronation of Edward IV's wife, Elizabeth Woodville, and officiated at the ceremony as both Lord Great Chamberlain, in the absence of the then office-holder, the Earl of Warwick, and as Chamberlain to the queen. In November 1468, however, he was committed to the Tower, and confessed to plotting with the Lancastrians against the King. He was likely released before 7 January 1469, and received a general pardon on 5 April of that year. However, by early July 1469, Oxford had joined the discontented Yorkists led by his brother-in-law, the Earl of Warwick, and King Edward's brother, the Duke of Clarence, for the Edgcote campaign. Following the loss at Losecoat Field on 12 March 1470, he fled overseas to the court of King Henry VI's wife, Margaret of Anjou. In September 1470 he joined Warwick and Clarence in the invasion of England which restored Henry VI to the throne, and on 13 October bore the Sword of State before Henry in a procession to St Paul's Cathedral. He was appointed Lord High Constable of England, and as such on 15 October tried and condemned for high treason the same Earl of Worcester who had in 1462 condemned Oxford's own father and brother.

In March 1471, he prevented Edward IV's army from landing in Norfolk, and was in command of the right wing at the Battle of Barnet on 14 April of that year, defeating the forces of Lord Hastings. However, this early success in the battle turned to disaster when Oxford's forces began pillaging. Oxford led his men back to the fight, but:

they lost their way in the fog and suddenly emerged on their own army, who mistook the Vere star for Edward's sun in splendour, and met them with a flight of arrows. Whereupon Oxford and his men cried "Treasoune! treasoune" and fled.

After this defeat Oxford escaped to Scotland with 40 men, accompanied by his two brothers, George and Thomas Vere, and the Viscount Beaumont. From there he went to France, where he collected ships and engaged in privateering. Although he was not attainted after leaving England in 1471, his lands were confiscated, and his wife, Margaret, is said to have been subjected to great financial hardship. On 28 May 1473, Oxford attempted an unsuccessful landing at St Osyth in Essex. On 30 September 1473, he seized St Michael's Mount in Cornwall, where he was besieged for some months by John Fortescue. After most of his men had deserted and he had been wounded in the face with an arrow, Oxford was eventually compelled to surrender on 15 February 1474, along with his two brothers and Beaumont.

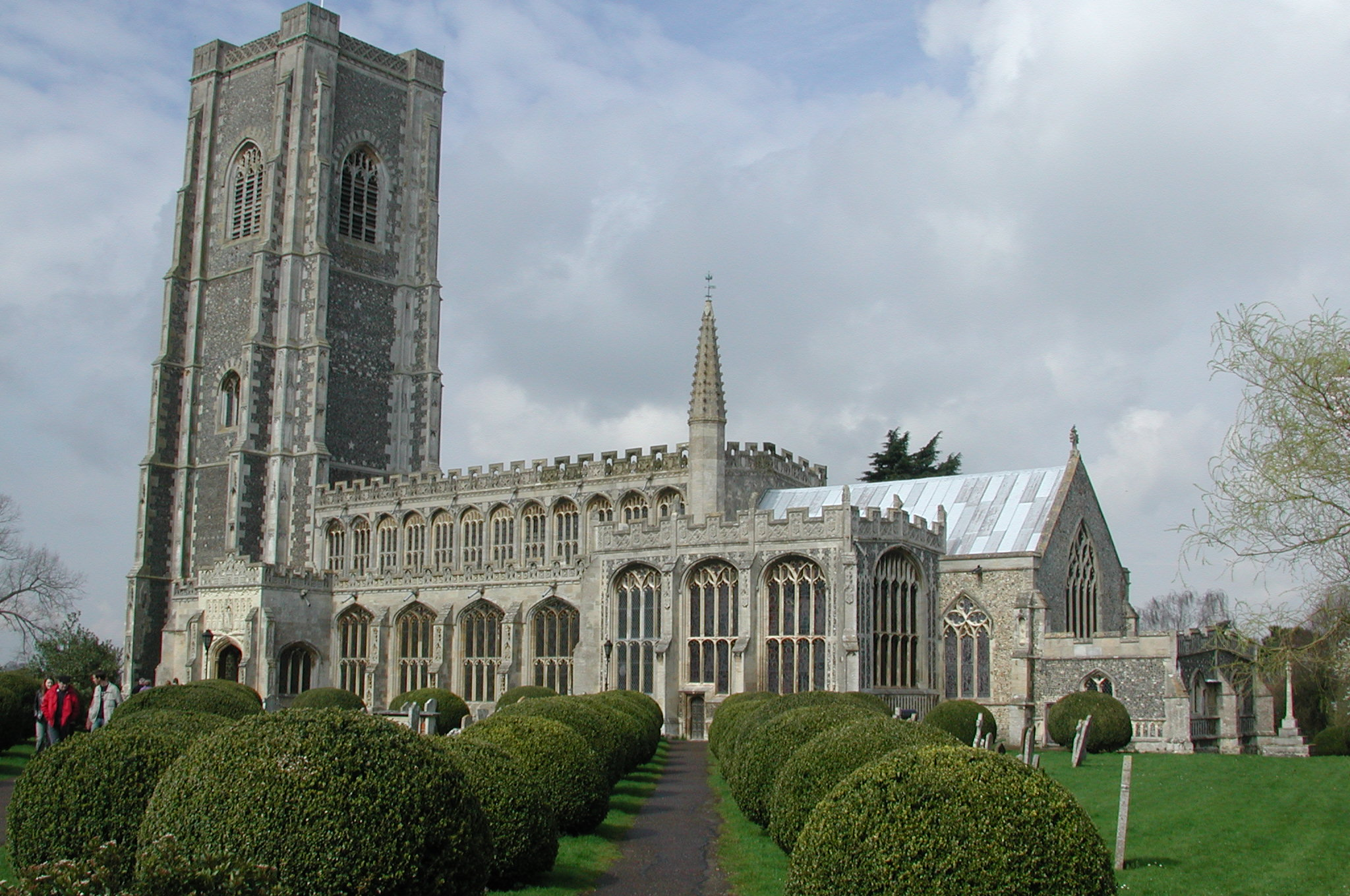
St Peter and St Paul's Church, Lavenham, Suffolk

Oxford was imprisoned at Hammes Castle near Calais, and was attainted early in 1475. At this time his mother, the 12th Earl's widow, was forced to surrender her property to the Duke of Gloucester. In 1478 Oxford scaled the walls of Hammes and leapt into the moat, though whether this was an attempt at escape or suicide is unclear. The new king, Richard III, ordered his transfer to England on 28 October 1484, but before the transfer could be effected Oxford had escaped, having persuaded the captain of Hammes, Sir James Blount, to go with him to join the Earl of Richmond. It is said that Richmond was "ravished with joy incredible" at this event. Oxford immediately returned to Hammes to bring the garrison there to join Richmond.

Oxford commanded the archers and Henry's vanguard using the formation called the Oxford Wedge, which penetrated Richard's army in the shape of an arrow at the Battle of Bosworth, and held Richmond's vanguard in fierce fighting in which John Howard, the Duke of Norfolk and the first cousin of Oxford's mother, who was leading the vanguard of Richard III, was killed. To celebrate the Tudor victory at Bosworth, Oxford commissioned the building of the Church of St Peter and St Paul at Lavenham.

== Service under Henry VII ==
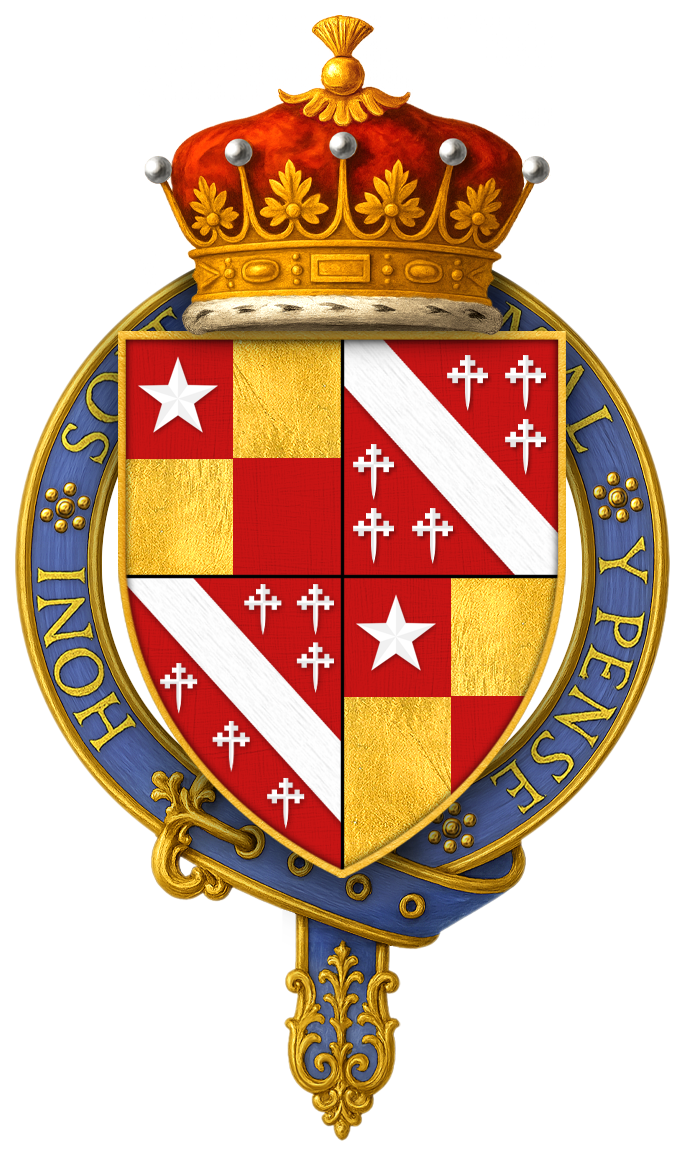
Oxford's coat of arms: De Vere (1, 4) quartered with Howard (2, 3)

According to Gunn, Oxford was 'immediately recognized as one of the great men of Henry VII's regime'. His attainder was repealed, he was restored to his estates and titles, and received many appointments and grants, including appointment as Lord Admiral on 21 September, and chief steward of the Duchy of Lancaster south of Trent and Constable of the Tower of London on 22 September 1485. He was also appointed the first Captain of the Yeomen of the Guard. He was sworn of the Privy Council, and recognized as Hereditary Lord Great Chamberlain of England. As Lord Great Chamberlain he officiated at the coronations of Henry VII and Elizabeth of York, bearing the king's train at the coronation and setting the crown upon the king's head at the coronation banquet. By 1486 he had been invested with the Order of the Garter. He was present at most great court occasions, and stood godfather to the king's eldest son, Arthur, Prince of Wales, in 1486, bestowing on his godson a gift of a pair of basins with a cup of assay, all gilt.

Nor were Oxford's fighting days over. In 1487, he commanded the vanguard at Stoke, the last battle of the Wars of the Roses; was in Picardy in 1492; and in 1497 was one of the commanders against the Cornish rebels at Blackheath. He presided as Lord High Steward at the trial of the Earl of Warwick on 21 November 1499. By 1499, Oxford's yearly landed income had risen to £1600. He entertained the king regularly on his progresses. However, Sir Francis Bacon's story that Henry VII imposed an enormous fine on the Earl for illegally bringing together more than the allowed number of retainers to welcome the king is likely apocryphal.

== Last years ==
On the accession of King Henry VIII, Oxford continued in high favour, and officiated as Lord Great Chamberlain at the coronation. He resided at Wivenhoe and Castle Hedingham in Essex, and added to the 12th-century keep of the latter and constructed a new great hall and several towers. His jousting helm is in the Bargello in Florence. According to Gunn, he 'kept an outstanding chapel choir', and commissioned Caxton's edition of The Four Sons of Aymon in 1489. Oxford also kept a playing company whose recorded performances span the years 1492–1499. Oxford employed the composer Mychelson in 1490.

Oxford died on 10 March 1513 at Castle Hedingham and was buried on 24 April at Colne Priory, Essex. He had no issue by either of his two marriages, and was succeeded as Earl by his nephew, John de Vere, 14th Earl of Oxford, the second but only surviving son of Sir George Vere, third son of the 12th Earl, and his wife, Margaret Stafford, the daughter and heir of Sir William Stafford of Bishops Frome, Hereford.

== Marriages and family ==
Oxford married firstly, Margaret Neville, the daughter of Richard Neville, 5th Earl of Salisbury, by Alice, the daughter of Thomas Montagu, 4th Earl of Salisbury. Oxford's first wife was the sister of Richard Neville, 16th Earl of Warwick, the Kingmaker, making Oxford the uncle of Isabel Neville, Duchess of Clarence as the wife of George Plantagenet, and Anne Neville, the Duchess of Gloucester and later Queen of England after her husband, Richard, was crowned Richard III. Margaret Neville died between 20 November 1506 and 14 January 1507.

Oxford married secondly Elizabeth Scrope, the widow of his colleague William, 2nd Viscount Beaumont, and daughter and coheir of Sir Richard Scrope of Bentley, the second son of Henry Scrope, 4th Baron Scrope of Bolton, by Eleanor, the daughter of Norman Washbourne of Wichenford.

They had no children. Elizabeth, Countess of Oxford, died in 1537. She mainly lived at Wivenhoe in Essex when she was not at court, and was buried there. She and her sister Mary, Lady Kingston, were members of the household of Catherine of Aragon and went to the Field of the Cloth of Gold in 1520. They were mourners at the funeral of Jane Seymour. The Countess bequeathed a gold cross containing a relic of the true Cross to John de Vere, 15th Earl of Oxford.

The Earl of Oxford is said to have had an illegitimate daughter, Katherine de Vere (d. after 20 June 1504), who married Sir Robert Broughton, 'one of the richest non-baronial landowners in England'. Broughton appointed the 13th Earl as supervisor of his will.

Sir Robert Broughton and Katherine de Vere had two sons and a daughter:

- John Broughton (d. 24 January 1518) of Toddington, Bedfordshire, who married Anne Sapcote (d. 14 March 1559), the daughter and heir of Sir Guy Sapcote by Margaret Wolston, daughter and heir of Sir Guy Wolston, and by her had a son, John Broughton (d.1528), and two daughters, Katherine Broughton (d. 23 April 1535), who was the first wife of William Howard, 1st Baron Howard of Effingham, and Anne Broughton, who married, as his second wife, by dispensation dated 24 May 1539, Sir Thomas Cheyney.
- Robert Broughton.
- Margaret Broughton, who married Henry Everard, by whom she had several children, including Elizabeth Everard, who married Sir William Clopton (d. 6 October 1568) of Liston Hall, Essex.

== Notes ==
Political offices
Preceded by Richard, Duke of Gloucester	Lord High Constable; 1470–1471	Succeeded by Richard, Duke of Gloucester
Preceded by Henry Percy, 4th Earl of Northumberland	Lord Great Chamberlain; 1475–1513	Succeeded by John de Vere, 14th Earl of Oxford
Preceded by John Howard, 1st Duke of Norfolk	Lord High Admiral of England; 1485–1513	Succeeded by Edward Howard
Peerage of England
Preceded by John de Vere, 12th Earl of Oxford	Earl of Oxford; 1462–1475, 1485–1513	Succeeded by John de Vere, 14th Earl of Oxford
