= William Blount, 4th Baron Mountjoy =

English courtier

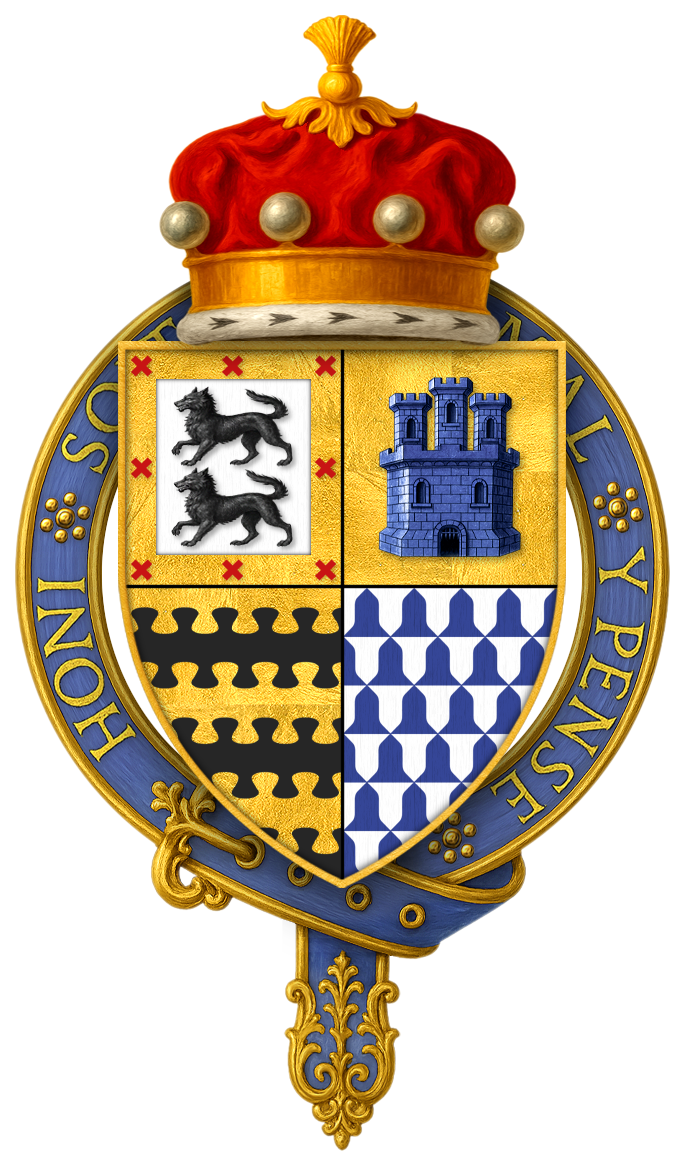
Arms of Sir William Blount, 4th Baron Mountjoy, KG: Quarterly 1st Argent two wolves passant in pale Sable on a border Or eight saltires Gules for Ayala; 2nd Or a tower triple towered portcullis raised Azure port Sable for Suarez de Toledo; 3rd barry nebully of six Or and Sable for Blount; 4th Vair for Beauchamp of Hache.

William Blount, 4th Baron Mountjoy KG (/blʌnt/; c. 1478 – 8 November 1534), of Barton Blount, Derbyshire, was an extremely influential English courtier, a respected humanistic scholar and patron of learning. He was one of the most influential and perhaps the wealthiest English noble courtier of his time. Mountjoy was known internationally as a humanist writer and scholar and patron of the arts.

== Origins ==
William Blount was born circa 1478 in Barton Blount, Derbyshire, the eldest son of John Blount, 3rd Baron Mountjoy (c. 1450 – 1485) by his wife Lora Berkeley (died 1501), daughter of Edward Berkeley (died 1506) of Beverston Castle, Gloucestershire. After her husband's death in 1485, Lora Berkeley remarried first Sir Thomas Montgomery (died 1495), and secondly Thomas Butler, 7th Earl of Ormond (died 1515), grandfather of Thomas Boleyn, 1st Earl of Wiltshire, father of Queen Anne Boleyn, second wife of King Henry VIII.

== Biography ==
Blount was a pupil of Erasmus, who called him inter nobiles doctissimus ("The most learned amongst the nobles"). His friends included John Colet, Thomas More and William Grocyn.

In 1497 he commanded part of a force sent to fight and suppress the rebellion of Perkin Warbeck. Mountjoy was appointed and served as King Henry VIII's boyhood tutor. In 1509 he was appointed Master of the Mint. In 1513 he was appointed Governor of Tournai (1513–1519), and his letters to Cardinal Wolsey and King Henry VIII describing his vigorous government of the town are preserved in the British Library.

In 1520 he was present with Henry VIII at the Field of the Cloth of Gold, and in 1522 at the king's meeting with Charles V, Holy Roman Emperor. Having served since 1512 as Chamberlain to Queen Katherine of Aragon, it fell to him in that office to announce to her the intention of Henry VIII to divorce her. He also signed the letter to Pope Clement VII conveying the King's threat to repudiate papal supremacy unless the divorce was granted. Mountjoy was one of the most influential and perhaps the wealthiest English noble courtier of his time. Sir William Blount, 4th Lord Mountjoy died on 8 November 1534 at Sutton-on-the-Hill, Derbyshire, England. Mountjoy was never disgraced, nor out of royal favour. His son Charles Blount, 5th Baron Mountjoy (1516–1544), was also a patron of learning.

== Family ==
Mountjoy married four times:

- Firstly, about Easter 1497, Elizabeth Saye (died before 1506), daughter and co-heiress of Sir William Saye of Essenden, Hertfordshire, by whom he had a daughter:
  - Gertrude Blount, later a lady in waiting to Queen Mary I (1553–1558), who on 25 October 1519 married Henry Courtenay, 1st Marquess of Exeter (c. 1498 – 1538), KG, PC, the eldest son of William Courtenay, 1st Earl of Devon by his wife Katherine of York, daughter of King Edward IV.
- Secondly, before the end of July 1509, Mountjoy married Inés de Venegas, one of the Spanish attendants or chamberers of Katherine of Aragon while she was Princess of Wales.
- Thirdly, before February 1515, Mountjoy married Alice Keble (died 8 June 1521), daughter of Henry Keble, Lord Mayor of London in 1510 and widow of Sir William Browne (died 1514), Lord Mayor of London in 1513. She died in 1521 and was buried at the Greyfriars, London. By Alice, he had children as follows:
  - Charles Blount, 5th Baron Mountjoy (28 June 1516 – 10 October 1544), eldest son and heir, like his father also a successful English courtier and patron of learning.
  - Katherine Blount (c. 1518 – 25 February 1559), who married firstly Sir John Champernowne of Modbury, Devon, and secondly Sir Maurice Berkeley (died 1581) of Bruton, Somerset.
- Fourthly, before 29 July 1523, Mountjoy married Dorothy Grey (daughter of Thomas Grey, 1st Marquess of Dorset by his wife, Cecily Bonville) and widow of Robert Willoughby, 2nd Baron Willoughby de Broke. Dorothy Grey was the sister of Thomas Grey, 2nd Marquess of Dorset (1477–1530), grandfather of Lady Jane Grey (1536/1537–1554). Dorothy, Lady Mountjoy, left a will proved 17 November 1553 (P.C.C. 20 Tasche). By Dorothy, Blount had the following children, all first-cousins-once-removed to Lady Jane Grey:
  - John Blount
  - Mary Blount, who married (as his first wife) Sir Robert Dennis, Knight (died 1592), of Holcombe Burnell in Devon.
  - Dorothy Blount, who married John Blewett, Esq. (died 1585) of Holcombe Rogus in Devon.

== Notes ==
Peerage of England
Preceded by John Blount	Baron Mountjoy; 1485–1534	Succeeded by Charles Blount
