= John de Vere, 12th Earl of Oxford =

15th century English noble

John de Vere
- 12th Earl of Oxford
- Born: 23 April 1408; Castle Hedingham, Essex
- Died: 26 February 1462 (aged 53); Tower Hill, London
- Noble family: de Vere
- Spouse: Elizabeth Howard
- Issue: Sir Aubrey Vere; John de Vere, 13th Earl of Oxford; Sir George Vere; Sir Richard Vere; Thomas Vere; Isabel Vere; Joan Vere; Mary Vere
- Father: Richard de Vere, 11th Earl of Oxford
- Mother: Alice Sergeaux

John de Vere, 12th Earl of Oxford (23 April 1408 – 26 February 1462), was the son of Richard de Vere, 11th Earl of Oxford (1385? – 15 February 1417), and his second wife, Alice Sergeaux (1386–1452). A Lancastrian loyalist during the latter part of his life, he was convicted of high treason and executed on Tower Hill on 26 February 1462.

== Life ==
John de Vere, 12th Earl of Oxford, born 23 April 1408 at Hedingham Castle, was the elder son of Richard de Vere, 11th Earl of Oxford, and his second wife, Alice, the widow of Guy St Aubyn, and daughter of Sir Richard Sergeaux of Colquite, Cornwall, by his second wife, Philippa (d. 13 Sep 1399), the daughter and co-heiress of Sir Edmund Arundel. Through their second son, Sir Robert Vere, the 11th Earl and his wife, Philippa, were the great-grandparents of John de Vere, 15th Earl of Oxford.

The 12th Earl inherited his title as a minor at his father's death on 15 February 1417. Custody of his person and lands was granted firstly to the Duke of Exeter until his death in 1426, and later to the Duke of Bedford. In 1425, while still underage, Oxford married the heiress Elizabeth Howard (c. 1410–1473/4), the daughter of Sir John Howard, 7th Lord Plaiz (c. 1385/6–1409), a brother of Sir Robert Howard, father of John Howard, 1st Duke of Norfolk. After the death of her grandfather, Sir John Howard of Wiggenhall (c. 1366 – 17 November 1436), Elizabeth inherited lands in Norfolk, Suffolk, Essex and Cambridgeshire. Although Oxford claimed the marriage had been contracted on Exeter's advice, it had not been authorized by license from the King, and Oxford was fined £2000. According to Castor, Oxford had difficulty making payment of this large fine since "the earldom of Oxford was among the poorest of the comital titles", with Oxford stating in 1437 that his lands were worth only £500 per year.

Oxford was knighted at Leicester on 26 May 1426, together with 34 others including his brother, Robert, and the four-year-old King Henry VI. On 4 July 1429 he was granted livery of his lands. In 1431 he was appointed to the Privy Council. During the 1430s and 1440s Oxford was involved in local politics in East Anglia, being appointed to various commissions in Essex and serving as a Justice of the Peace in Suffolk and Cambridgeshire. In February 1435 he was licensed to travel to the Holy Land, although there is no evidence that he actually did so.

In July 1436 Oxford mustered his retainers at Sandwich, Kent for an expedition to relieve the Siege of Calais by the Duke of Burgundy. On 23 July 1437 he was summoned to attend the funeral of Queen Joan at Canterbury. In June 1439, with Cardinal Henry Beaufort and other envoys, he was appointed a commissioner to treat of peace with France. On 16 May 1441 he sailed from Portsmouth to France with Richard Plantagenet, 3rd Duke of York, who had been appointed Lieutenant-General and Governor of France and Normandy. In June 1450 Oxford was among the noblemen appointed to act against Jack Cade's Kentish rebels.

In the late 1440s, Oxford extended his political influence in East Anglia to Norfolk. He was regularly appointed a Justice of the Peace there, and in 1450, after the fall from power of William de la Pole, 1st Duke of Suffolk, Oxford, together with John Mowbray, 3rd Duke of Norfolk, and Sir John Fastolf, challenged the influence of Suffolk's supporters in that county. By the spring of 1451, however, Suffolk's associates had regrouped under the leadership of Thomas, Lord Scales and the widowed Duchess of Suffolk, and by 1452 leading members of Suffolk's affinity such as Sir Thomas Tuddenham and John Heydon were again being appointed to office.

As national politics became increasingly divided during the 1450s, Oxford did not immediately take sides, although he was a member of the council while the Duke of York was Lord Protector in 1453–54 during Henry VI's period of mental breakdown, and on 28 May 1454, together with 6 other peers and his brother, Sir Robert Vere, undertook to keep the seas for three years. In May 1455 he and the Duke of Norfolk both arrived a day too late to take part in the Battle of St Albans. It was not until 1459 that Oxford committed himself to Margaret of Anjou against the Duke of York. In December of that year and in April 1460 he was appointed to lead anti-Yorkist commissions of array in Essex, and by May 1460 his eldest son, Sir Aubrey Vere, who had recently married Anne, the daughter of Humphrey Stafford, 1st Duke of Buckingham, was reported to be "great with the Queen".

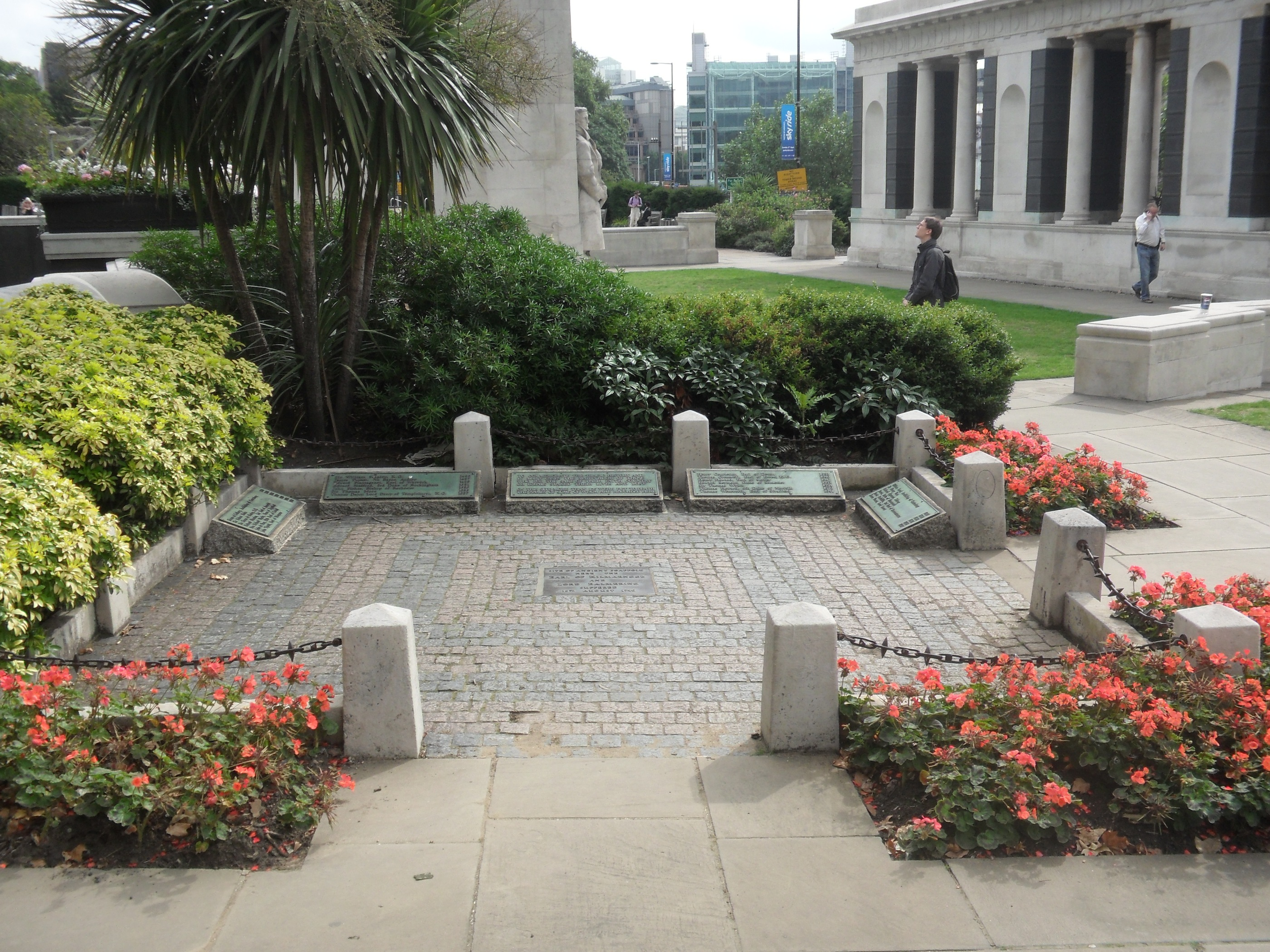
Site of the scaffold on Tower Hill

After the Yorkist victory at the Battle of Northampton in July 1460, Oxford appears to have suffered from ill health. In November of that year, he was exempted, "in consideration of his infirmities", from appearing in person before the King or in Council or Parliament. If he was feigning illness in order to maintain a low profile in the face of the new Yorkist regime under King Edward IV, the ploy was unsuccessful. In February 1462 Oxford was arrested, together with his son Aubrey and Sir Thomas Tuddenham, his former opponent in Norfolk and now a fellow Lancastrian loyalist, Sir John Montgomery, Sir William Tyrrell and John Clopton, and convicted of high treason before the Constable of England, John Tiptoft, 1st Earl of Worcester. On 26 February 1462 Oxford was beheaded on Tower Hill. Then he was buried in the church of the Austin Friars, London. His eldest son, Aubrey, had been executed there six days earlier, and Oxford was therefore succeeded by his second son, John de Vere, 13th Earl of Oxford.

== Marriage and issue ==
Oxford married, between 22 May and 31 August 1425, Elizabeth Howard, de jure Baroness Plaitz in her own right (c. 1410–1475), the only child and heiress of Sir John Howard, 7th Lord and Baron Plaiz (c. 1385/6 – c. 1409), and his wife Joan Walton, the daughter of John Walton of Wivenhoe, Essex and Margery Sutton, by whom he had five sons and three daughters:

- Sir Aubrey Vere, who married Anne Stafford, daughter of Humphrey Stafford, 1st Duke of Buckingham
- John de Vere, 13th Earl of Oxford (1442–1513).
- Sir George Vere, who married Margaret Stafford, daughter and heiress of Sir William Stafford of Bishop's Frome, Herefordshire, by whom he had two sons, George Vere and John de Vere, 14th Earl of Oxford, and four daughters, Elizabeth, who married Sir Anthony Wingfield of Letheringham, Suffolk; Margaret; Dorothy, who married John Neville, 3rd Baron Latimer; and Ursula, who married firstly George Windsor (d. 1520), eldest son and heir of Andrew Windsor, 1st Baron Windsor, who predeceased his father, and secondly Sir Edmund Knightley.
- Sir Richard Vere, who married Margaret, daughter of Sir Henry Percy and widow of Henry, 3rd Baron Grey of Codnor.
- Sir Thomas Vere.
- Mary Vere, a nun at Barking Abbey.
- Joan (or Jane) Vere, who married Sir William Norreys, and was the maternal grandmother of Gertrude Tyrrell.
- Elizabeth Vere, who married William Bourchier.

== Notes ==
Peerage of England
Preceded by Richard de Vere	Earl of Oxford; 1417/29–1462	Succeeded by John de Vere
