= Christ Church Greyfriars =

Church in the City of London, United Kingdom

Coordinates: 51°30′56.94″N 0°5′56.93″W

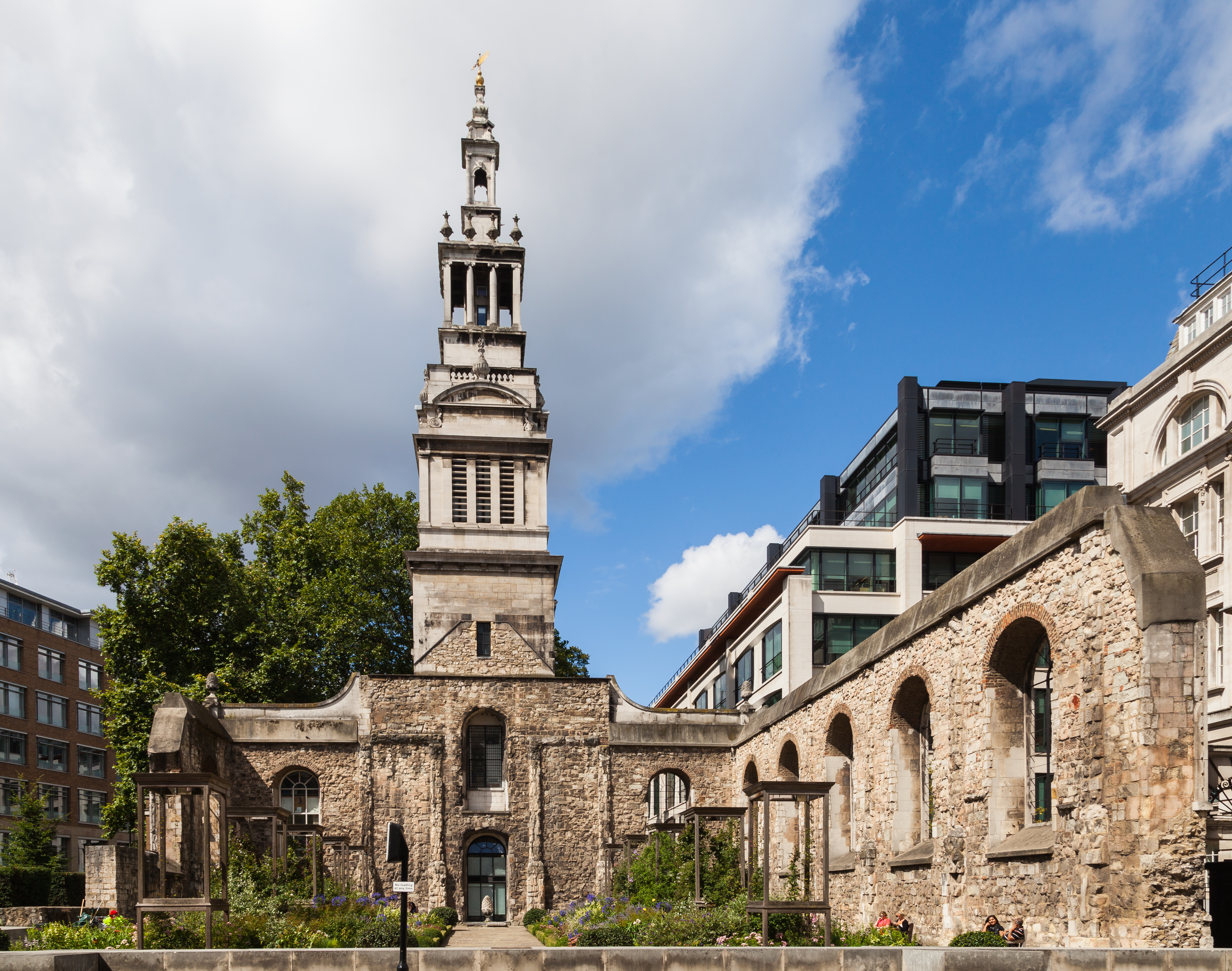
- Christ Church Greyfriars, seen from the southeast
- Christ Church Greyfriars
- OS grid reference: TQ 31981 81372
- Location: Newgate Street, London
- Country: England
- Denomination: Anglican

Architecture
- Heritage designation: Grade I

Christ Church Greyfriars, also known as Christ Church Newgate Street, was a church in Newgate Street, opposite St Paul's Cathedral in the City of London. Established as a monastic church in the thirteenth century, it became a parish church after the Dissolution of the Monasteries. Following its destruction in the Great Fire of London of 1666, it was rebuilt to the designs of Sir Christopher Wren. Except for the tower, the church was largely destroyed by bombing during the Second World War. The decision was made not to rebuild the church; the ruins are now a public garden.

== History ==
=== Gothic church ===
Christ Church Greyfriars had its origins in the conventual church of a Franciscan monastery, the name 'Greyfriars' being a reference to the grey habits worn by Franciscan friars. The first church on the site was built in the mid-thirteenth century, but this was soon replaced by a much larger building, begun in the 1290s and finished in about 1360. This new church was the second largest in medieval London, measuring 300 feet (91 m) long and 89 feet (27 m) wide, with at least eleven altars. It was built partly at the expense of Marguerite of France, second wife of King Edward I. She was buried at the church, as was Isabella, widow of Edward II and her daughter Joan of the Tower, Queen of Scotland. The heart of Eleanor of Provence, wife of Henry III, was also interred there.

Richard Whittington, Lord Mayor of London, founded a library in connection with the church in 1429.

The monastery was dissolved in 1538 during the English Reformation. The building and fittings suffered heavy damage in this period. Tombs disappeared, sold for their marble and other valuable materials; monuments were defaced. In 1546, Henry VIII gave the priory and its church, along with the churches of St Nicholas Shambles and St Ewin, Newgate Market, to the City Corporation. A new parish of Christ Church was created, incorporating those of St Nicholas and St Ewin, and part of that of St Sepulchre. The priory buildings later housed Christ's Hospital school, founded by Edward VI, and the church became its pupils' principal place of worship.

In the 1640s, Christ Church was the church of the Presbyterian polemicist Thomas Edwards, and during May 1647 became a centre of operations for attempts to disband and pay arrears to members of the New Model Army.

=== Wren's church ===
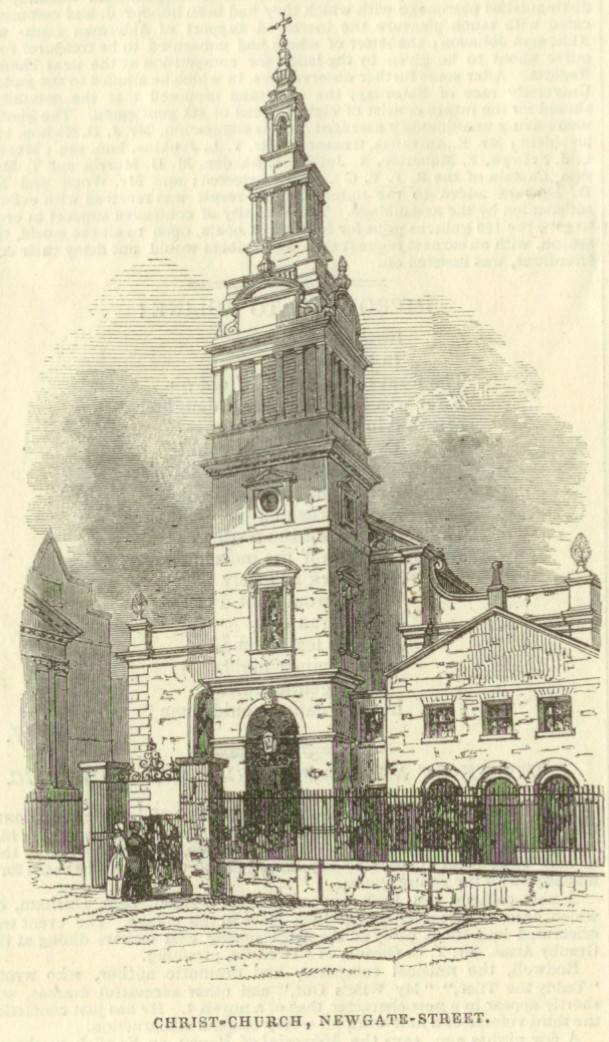
Christ Church as depicted in an 1845 edition of the Illustrated London News.

The medieval church was destroyed by the Great Fire of London in 1666. Reconstruction was assigned to Wren, who oversaw a decades long programme to rebuild St. Paul's Cathedral and approximately 50 parish churches. There appears to have been some debate about the form the new Christ Church should take. A surviving unused design shows a structure considerably larger than the one eventually built.

The parish was united with that of St Leonard, Foster Lane, which was not rebuilt.

Parishioners raised £1,000 to begin work on the design. To save time and money, the foundations of the gothic church were partially reused. The new church and tower (without steeple) were completed in 1687, at a total cost of £11,778 9s. 7¼d. Smaller than the gothic structure, the building measured 114 feet (35 m) long and 81 feet (25 m) wide, occupying only the eastern end of the site of the medieval church, the western part becoming its churchyard.

The tower, rising from the west end of the church, had a simple round-arched main entranceway and, above, windows decorated with neoclassical pediments. Large carved pineapples, symbols of welcome, graced the four roof corners of the main church structure. Unique among the Wren churches, the east and west walls had buttresses.

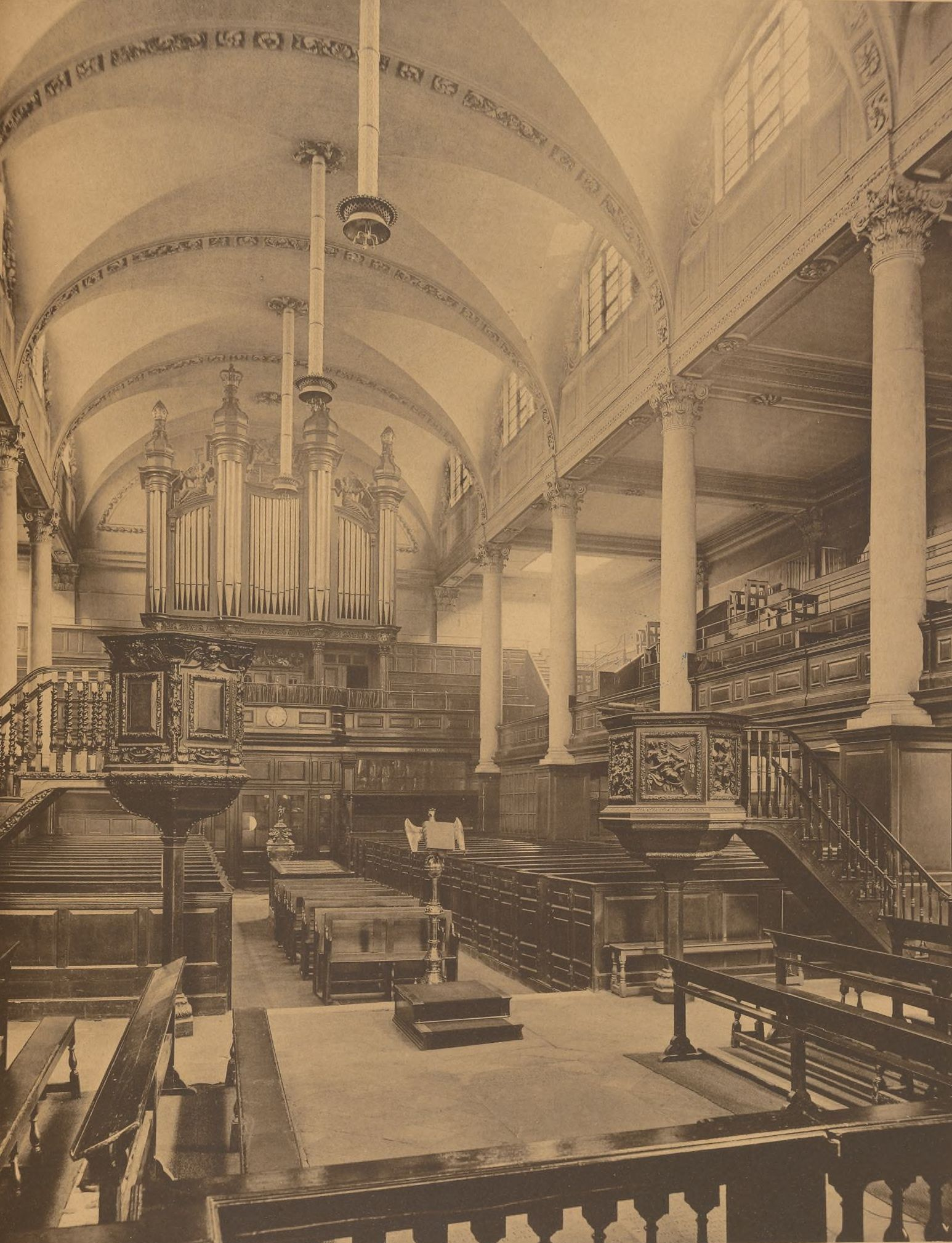
Interior view

The interior was divided into nave and aisles by Corinthian columns, raised on tall plinths so that their bases were level with the gallery floors. The aisles had flat ceilings, while the nave had a shallow cross-vault. The north and south walls had large round-arched windows of clear glass, which allowed for a brightly lit interior. The east end had trinity windows, a large wooden altar screen and a carved hexagonal pulpit, reached by stairs. There was elaborate carved wainscoting. A pavement of reddish brown and grey marble to the west of the altar rails was said to date from the original gothic church, alternatively sourced by Wren from a limestone quarry on the Swedish island of Öland. Galleries stood over the north and south aisles, built at special request of the officers of Christ's Hospital as seating for the school's students. Pews were said to have been made from the timbers of a wrecked Spanish galleon. The organ, on the west wall over the main nave door, was built by Renatus Harris in 1690, according to a pre-war guide to the church.

The steeple, standing about 160 feet (49 m) tall, was finished in 1704 at an additional cost of £1,963, 8s. 3½ d. It has three diminishing storeys, square in plan, the middle one with a freestanding Ionic colonnade.

Over the course of the church’s existence, significant modifications were made. In 1760, a vestry house was built against the facade’s south side and part of the church's south wall. At some point, rooms were enclosed in the north and south aisles beneath the galleries. Stained glass depicting Jesus with the children was installed in the centre trinity window to replace the original clear glass.

The church functioned as an important centre of City of London society and music. The Lord Mayor attended an annual service to hear the Ancient Spital Sermon on the second Wednesday after Easter, placing his ceremonial sword in a special holder. Felix Mendelssohn played Bach's A minor fugue and other works on the organ in 1837. Samuel Wesley also performed at the church.

The Christ's Hospital boys continued to attend services, sitting in the galleries. According to the pre-war guide book to the church, they included the young Samuel Coleridge and Charles Lamb. Sixth Form boys tasked with maintaining order sat in special seats placed over those of the younger students. A few boys carved initials in the woodwork.

=== Decline of the congregation ===
In 1902, Christ's Hospital moved out of the City to Horsham, West Sussex, ending the Sunday influx of its schoolboys. A new vicar, T.R. Hine-Haycock, took over in 1912. A July 1922 Christ Church newsletter preserved at Guildhall Library shows that at that time it had an 8:30 a.m. Holy Communion service every Sunday, and musical services at 11 a.m. every first and third Sunday.The church was open daily for private prayer from noon to 3 p.m. In its final years, the congregation continued to drop in size, a common trend for City churches as people relocated to suburban neighbourhoods of London. Parish records at the Guildhall Library show there were 112 members in April 1933, mostly residents of places outside the parish boundaries. Many of those who made their homes in the parish were "housekeepers", people who lived in and looked after commercial buildings. In April 1937, the membership had dropped to 77.

=== Destruction ===
The church was severely damaged in the Blitz on 29 December 1940. During one of the Second World War's fiercest air raids on London, a firebomb struck the roof and tore into the nave. Much of the surrounding neighbourhood was also set alight—a total of eight Wren churches burned that night. At Christ Church, the only fitting known to have been saved was the cover of the finely carved wooden font, recovered by an unknown fireman who ran inside as the flames raged. The roof and vaulting collapsed into the nave; the tower and four main walls, made of stone, remained standing but were smoke-scarred and gravely weakened. A photograph taken the following day shows two firemen hosing down smouldering rubble in the nave.

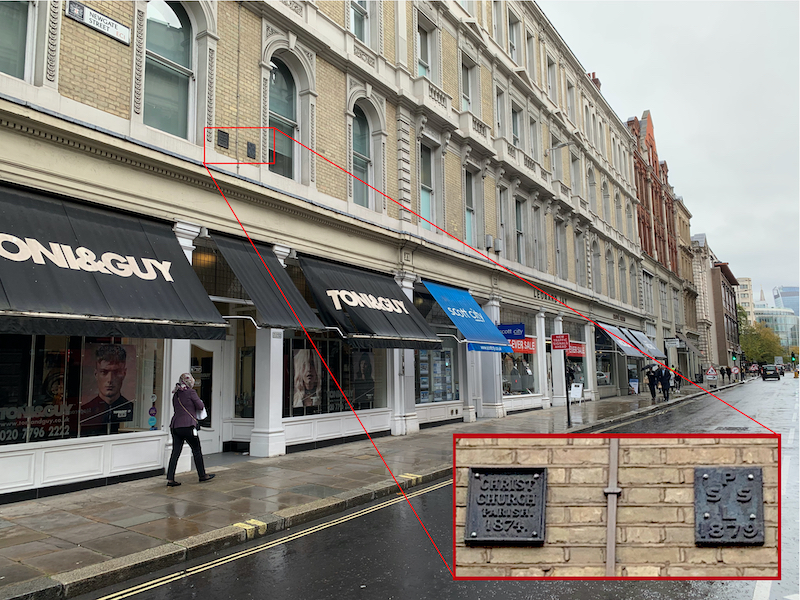
Christchurch & St Sepulchre parish boundary marker 1

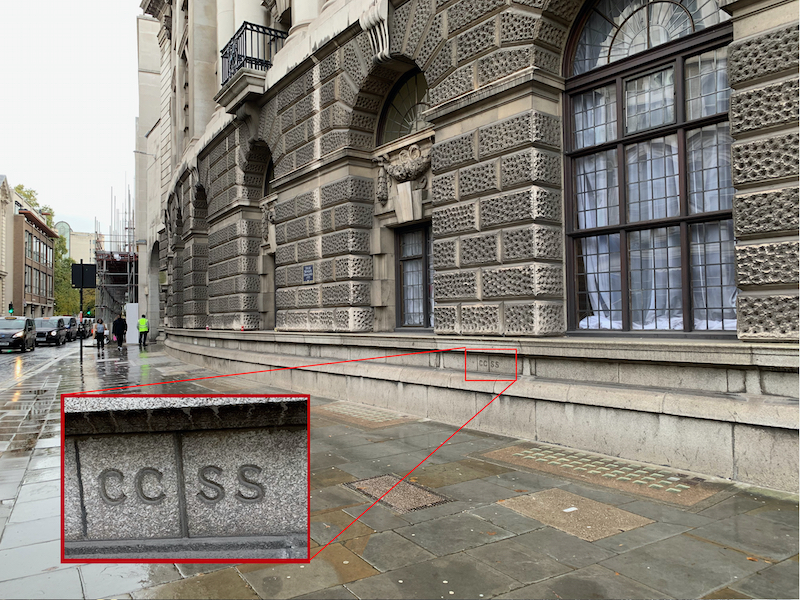
Christchurch & St Sepulchre parish boundary marker 2

=== Post-war period ===
In 1944, The Times wrote about the ruins of Christ Church

The time will come – much sooner than most of us to-day can visualise – when no trace of death from the air will be left in the streets of rebuilt London. At such a time the story of the blitz may begin to seem unreal not only to visiting tourists but to a new generation of Londoners. It is the purpose of war memorials to remind posterity of the reality of the sacrifices upon which its apparent security has been built. These church ruins, we suggest, would do this with realism and gravity.

In 1949, in a reorganisation of Church of England parishes in London, authorities decided not to rebuild Christ Church. The remains of the church were designated a Grade I listed building on 4 January 1950. In 1954, the Christ Church parish was merged with that of the nearby St Sepulchre-without-Newgate.

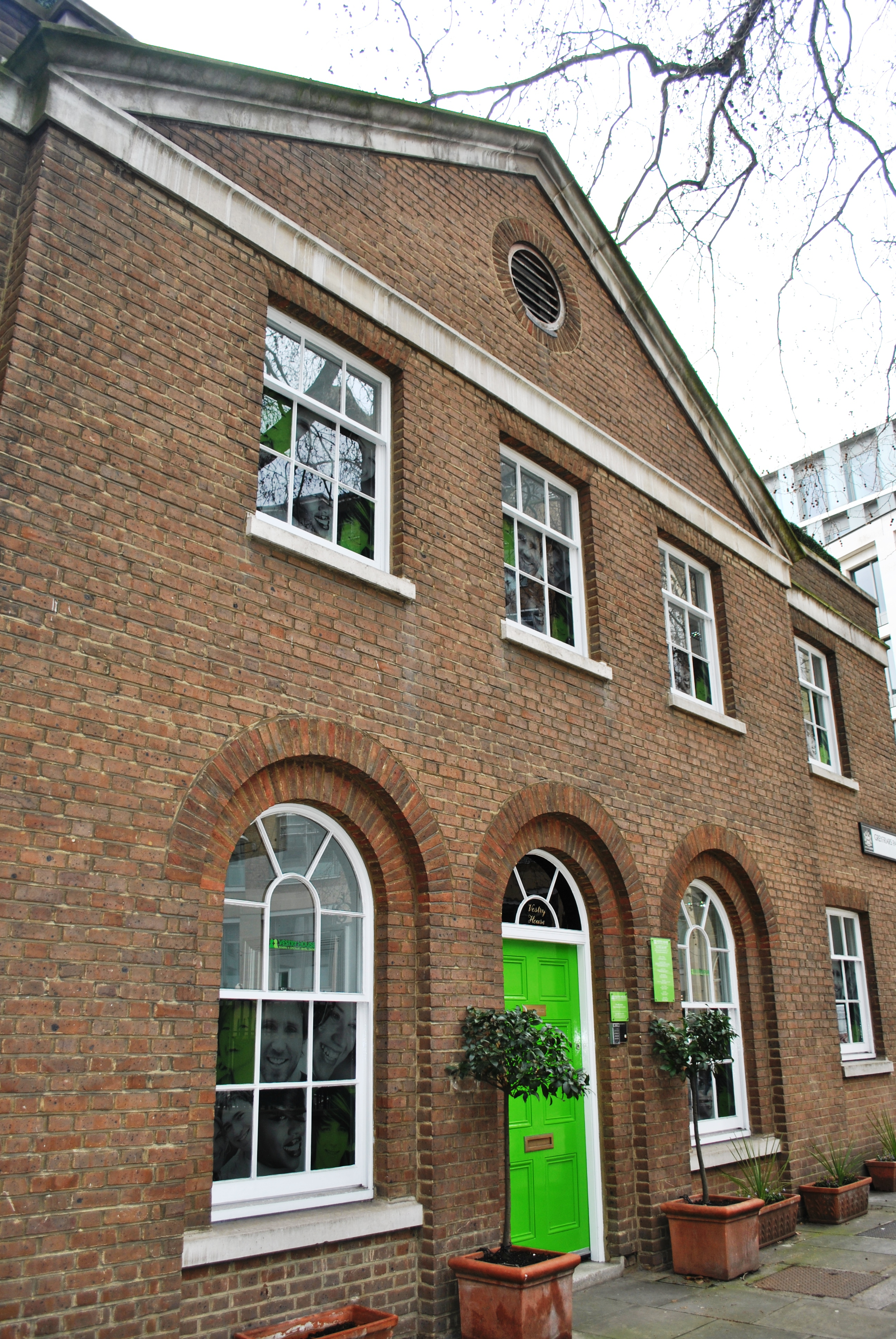
Christ Church Greyfriars, neo-Georgian brick offices

The steeple, still standing after the wartime damage, was disassembled in 1960 and put back together using modern construction methods. The surviving lower part of the south wall and the entire east wall were demolished in 1962 to make way for a widening of King Edward Street. In 1981, neo-Georgian brick offices were constructed against the southwest corner of the ruins, in imitation of the 1760 vestry house that had stood there. In 1989, the former nave area became a public garden and memorial. The tower's lower levels functioned as commercial rental space.

In 2002, the financial firm Merrill Lynch completed a regional headquarters complex on land abutting to the north and the west. In conjunction with that project, the Christ Church site underwent a major renovation and archeological examination, King Edward Street was returned to its former course, and the site of the church regained its pre-war footprint. The churchyard was spruced up and its metal railings restored. In 2006, work was completed to convert the tower and spire into a modern twelve-level private residence. The nave area continues as a memorial; the wooden font cover, topped by a carved angel, can today be seen in the porch of St Sepulchre-without-Newgate.

As of late 2025, the City of London Corporation was creating a new 3,000-square meter public space adjacent to the church site, to be called Greyfriars Square. The design provides for the permanent closure of a section of King Edward Street to create a pedestrian-friendly area that will include plants, outdoor seating and children’s play equipment. The project is scheduled for completion in 2027.

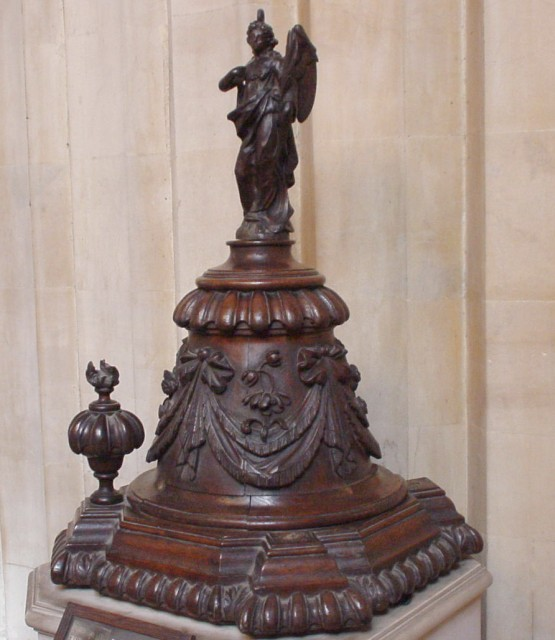
Christ Church Font Cover

=== Burials ===
- John Segrave, 4th Baron Segrave
- James Fiennes, 1st Baron Saye and Sele
- John Devereux, 1st Baron Devereux
- Elizabeth Barton (the 'holy maid of Kent')
- Richard Baxter (theologian)
- Venetia Stanley (society beauty)
- Kenelm Digby (courtier, adventurer, and natural philosopher)
- Humphry Ditton (mathematician)
- Isabella of France, Queen of England, wife of King Edward II
- Thomas Malory (author of Le Morte d'Arthur)
- Margaret of France, Queen of England, second wife of King Edward I
- Joan of the Tower, Queen of Scotland, first wife of King David II of Scotland
- Margaret, Duchess of Norfolk (noblewoman)
- Isabella, Countess of Bedford (princess), daughter of King Edward III
- Beatrice of England (princess), daughter of King Henry III
- Richard Royston (Royalist printer)
- Sir William Byrt (knighted by King Edward IV)
- Lawrence Sheriff (Queen's Grocer); founder of Rugby School

== See also ==
- List of Christopher Wren churches in London
- List of churches rebuilt after the Great Fire but since demolished
