= St Audoen within Newgate =

Coordinates: 51°30′57″N 0°6′2″W

St Audoen
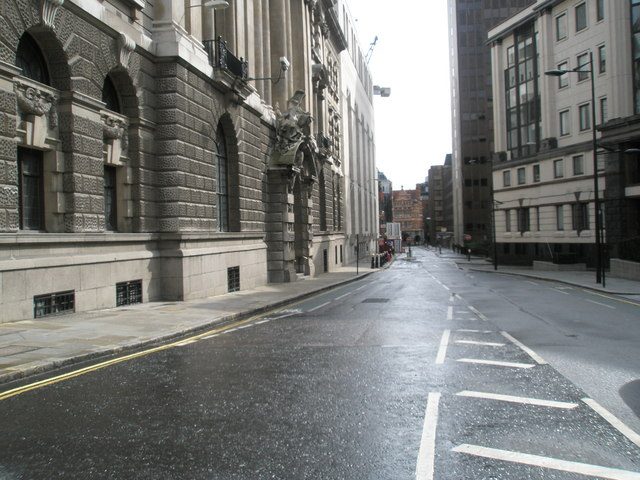
- Current photo of site
- St Audoen
- Location: London
- Country: England
- Denomination: Church of England

History
- Founded: 1220

Architecture
- Closed: 1547
- Demolished: 1583

St. Audoen's Church (within Newgate) (alternatively known as St. Ewen's, St. Ewan's or St. Ewin's) was a medieval parish church in the City of London situated on the north-east corner of Newgate Street and Eldeness Lane (now Warwick Lane). It was first mentioned as Parochia sancti Audoeni in around 1220. Named in honour of Audoen or Ouen, the seventh-century Bishop of Rouen, it was anciently called Sti Audoeni juxta fratres minores London (infra Newgate). Like its sister church in Dublin, it is believed that this was home to a religious guild of St. Anne.

In 1546, Henry VIII gave the church, along with St Nicholas Shambles and the dissolved Christ Church priory to the City corporation. A new parish was created for Christ Church, out of those of St Audoen and St Nicholas, and part of that of St Sepulchre. St Audoen's Church was demolished in around 1583.
