= John of Gloucester =

Illegitimate son of King Richard III of England

- Captain of Calais
- Tenure: 11 March 1485 – c. 22 August 1485
- Predecessor: John Blount, 3rd Baron Mountjoy
- Successor: Giles Daubeney, 1st Baron Daubeney
- Born: c. 1468
- Died: c. 1499
- Father: Richard III

John of Gloucester (or John of Pontefract) (c. 1468 – c. 1499 (based on historical hypothesis)), also known as John Plantagenet, was an illegitimate son of King Richard III of England. John is so-called because his father was the Duke of Gloucester at the time of his birth. His father appointed him Captain of Calais, a position he lost after his father's death. He seems to have been held in custody at some point during the reign of Henry VII and may have been executed around 1499.

== Early life ==
The identity of John's mother is not known, nor is his date of birth. However, since Katherine, Richard III's other illegitimate child, was old enough to be wedded in 1484 and John was old enough to be knighted in September 1483 in York Minster (when his half brother Edward, Richard's only legitimate heir, was invested Prince of Wales) and to be made Captain of Calais in March 1485, most historians agree these two children were fathered during Richard's teen years.

Dr Ashdown-Hill suggests that John was conceived during Richard's first solo expedition to the eastern counties in the summer of 1467 at the invitation of John Howard and that the boy was born in 1468 and named after his friend and supporter. Richard himself noted John was still a minor (not being yet 21) when he issued the royal patent appointing him Captain of Calais on 11 March 1485, possibly on his seventeenth birthday.

An order referring to his appointment as Captain of Calais calls him "John de Pountfreit Bastard." Because of this, it has been suggested that he was born at Pontefract. Michael Hicks has suggested that John's mother was Alice Burgh, who was granted an annuity of twenty pounds when Richard was at Pontefract on 1 March 1474; the grant states that it was made for "certain special causes and considerations." Another candidate is Katherine Haute, who Rosemary Horrox has suggested was a mistress of Richard and possibly the mother of Richard's illegitimate daughter Katherine, who married William Herbert, 2nd Earl of Pembroke. Horrox notes that Richard granted Katherine Haute an annuity of five pounds in 1477. It is unknown, however, whether Katherine and John had the same mother. They were both half-siblings of Edward of Middleham, Prince of Wales.

== Career ==
John was one of two persons knighted on 8 September 1483 in York during the celebrations which invested his half-brother Edward of Middleham as Prince of Wales.

John is known to have been in Calais by November 1484 and was officially appointed Captain of Calais by his father on 11 March 1485. His letter of appointment has Richard referring to him as "our dear bastard son". The patent appointing John gave him all of the necessary powers of his position, except of appointing officers, which it reserved until he turned twenty-one; it does not indicate how close to turning twenty-one he was. A warrant dated 9 March 1485 to deliver clothing to "the Lord Bastard" probably refers to John.

== Under Henry VII ==
After Richard was killed in the Battle of Bosworth Field (22 August 1485), Henry VII removed John from the position of Captain of Calais, but did not further persecute him and, on 1 March 1486, granted him an annual income of 20 pounds sterling.

In his confession, Perkin Warbeck stated that when he began his impersonation of Richard, Duke of York, in 1491, "King Richard's bastard son was in the hands of the king of England." In the seventeenth century, an early defender of Richard III, George Buck, claimed that around the time of the executions of Warbeck and Edward, Earl of Warwick, in 1499, "there was a base son of King Richard III made away, and secretly, having been kept long before in prison." Buck, who does not identify John by name, claims that he was executed to prevent him from falling into the hands of certain Irishmen who wished to make him their chief or prince. There are no other sources for John's execution.
