= Edward Blount, 2nd Baron Mountjoy =

English peer

Edward Blount, 2nd Baron Mountjoy (1464 – 12 October 1475) was an English peer.

Edward Blount was born in 1464 in London, the second son of Sir William Blount (c. 1442–1471) and Margaret de Echyngham. He inherited his title on the death of his grandfather Walter Blount, 1st Baron Mountjoy in 1474 after his father Sir William Blount had been killed in 1471 at the Battle of Barnet during the Wars of the Roses and his elder brother had died young in 1462. He was betrothed to Anne Cobham, the under-aged heiress daughter of Thomas Cobham, but the marriage was not consummated.

On his death on 12 October 1475, the title passed to his uncle John Blount, 3rd Baron Mountjoy. His fiancée/widow, still only 9 years old, went on to marry Edward Burgh, 2nd Baron Burgh.

Peerage of England
Preceded by Walter Blount	Baron Mountjoy; 1474–1475	Succeeded by John Blount
