= St Nicholas Shambles =

Coordinates: 51°30′56″N 0°5′54″W

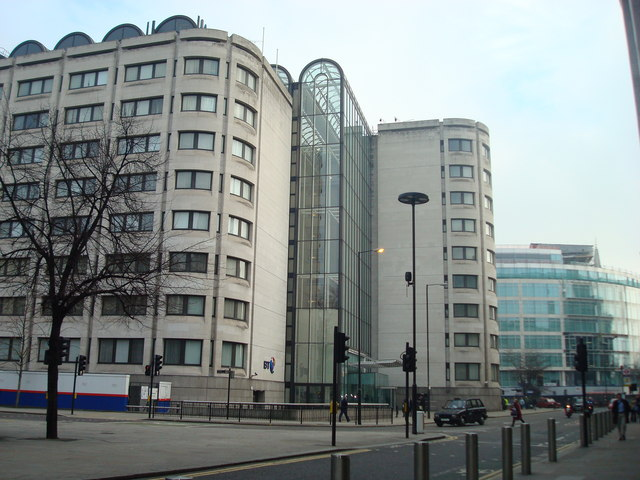
- The BT Centre from the southwest, on the site of the church of St Nicholas Shambles
- St Nicholas Shambles
- Location: London
- Country: England
- Denomination: Roman Catholic

History
- Founded: 1196

Architecture
- Demolished: 1547

St Nicholas Shambles was a medieval church in the City of London, which stood on the corner of Butcher Hall Lane (now King Edward Street) and Newgate Street. It took its name from the Shambles, the butchers area in the west of Newgate Street. The church is first mentioned as St. Nicholas de Westrnacekaria. In 1253 Walter de Cantilupe, Bishop of Worcester granted indulgences to its parishioners.

In 1546, Henry VIII gave the church, along with that of St Ewin (also known as St Audoen) and the dissolved Christ Church priory to the City corporation. A new parish was created for Christ Church, out of those of St Nicholas and St Ewin, and part of that of St Sepulchre. St Nicholas's was demolished in 1547.

The site was extensively excavated in 1975–79 in preparation for construction of the GPO headquarters, (now the BT Centre). The excavations identified several phases of building. The original nave and chancel probably dated from the 11th century. They were extended in the late 12th century. Chapels were added to the east end in the 14th century, a north aisle was added to the nave in the first half of the 15th century, and, finally, the east end was rebuilt and a sacristy added on the north. The excavations included the graveyard. Among the finds was a woman who died in the later stages of childbirth.

Surviving parish records, now held among the archives of St Bartholomew's Hospital, include an exceptionally detailed inventory of church books, plate, vestments and other possessions of 1457, and a series of churchwardens' accounts running from 1452 to 1526.
