= Château de Hames =

Castle in Hauts-de-France, France

Château de Hames was a castle in Hames-Boucres, Pas-de-Calais, France.

== History ==
The castle at Hames consisted of a courtyard, surrounded by four towers with a donjon.

George Neville, Archbishop of York was arrested in 1472 on a charge of treason against Edward IV of England and secretly conveyed to France, where was imprisoned in the castle.

Edward Sutton, 4th Baron Dudley abandoned the castle, with the arrival of a French army led by Francis, Duke of Guise in 1558. The Duke of Guise ordered the destruction of the castle.
