= William de la Pole (1478–1539) =

English nobleman

Sir William de la Pole (1478 – sometime between October and November 1539), was an English nobleman, and Knight of Wingfield Castle in Wingfield, Suffolk. He was the son of John de la Pole, 2nd Duke of Suffolk (1442–1492) and Elizabeth Plantagenet (Elizabeth of York, Duchess of Suffolk) (1444–1504), a sister of Edward IV and Richard III. Through his mother, he was clearly in the line of succession to the English Crown, with ultimately disastrous consequences for himself.

Around 1497, he married Katherine Stourton, daughter of William Stourton, 2nd Baron Stourton and Margaret Chidiocke, but they had no issue. Katherine, twice widowed and aged about 42, was more than 20 years older than William, so the motive for the marriage was probably financial (her second husband, Henry, Lord Grey of Codnor, had left her much of his property).

He was brother to John de la Pole, 1st Earl of Lincoln, Edmund de la Pole, 3rd Duke of Suffolk and Richard de la Pole. As nephews of Edward IV the de la Pole family had a much stronger hereditary claim to the throne than Henry VII, who was descended through his mother from an illegitimate son of John of Gaunt. Even if William, unlike his brothers, had no personal ambition to seize the throne, his ancestry would have made it impossible for Henry to trust him. The discovery of a plot involving the de la Pole brothers in 1501 sealed William's fate.

He was held prisoner in the Tower of London for 37 years till his death, longer than anyone else in the Tower's history, for allegedly plotting against King Henry VII with his brothers Edmund and Richard, who fled the country in 1501, after their conspiracy was detected. The fact that William did not flee with them might have been seen as evidence that he was innocent, but the King did not trust this loyalty.

== Ancestors ==
Ancestors of William de la Pole (1478–1539)

16. Michael de la Pole, 1st Earl of Suffolk
8. Michael de la Pole, 2nd Earl of Suffolk
17. Catherine Wingfield
4. William de la Pole, 1st Duke of Suffolk
18. Hugh de Stafford, 2nd Earl of Stafford
9. Katherine de Stafford
19. Philippa de Beauchamp
2. John de la Pole, 2nd Duke of Suffolk
20. Geoffrey Chaucer
10. Thomas Chaucer
21. Philippa Roet (sister of 31.)
5. Alice Chaucer
22. Sir John Burghersh
11. Matilda Burghersh
23.
1. William de la Pole
24. Edmund of Langley, 1st Duke of York (brother of 30.)
12. Richard of Conisburgh, 3rd Earl of Cambridge
25. Isabella of Castile
6. Richard of York, 3rd Duke of York
26. Roger Mortimer, 4th Earl of March
13. Anne de Mortimer
27. Alianore Holland
3. Elizabeth of York
28. John Neville, 3rd Baron Neville de Raby
14. Ralph de Neville, 1st Earl of Westmorland
29. Maud Percy
7. Cecily Neville
30. John of Gaunt, 1st Duke of Lancaster (brother of 24.)
15. Joan Beaufort
31. Katherine Swynford (sister of 21.)
