= Wingfield, Suffolk =

Village in Suffolk, England

Coordinates: 52.347°N 1.271°E

Wingfield
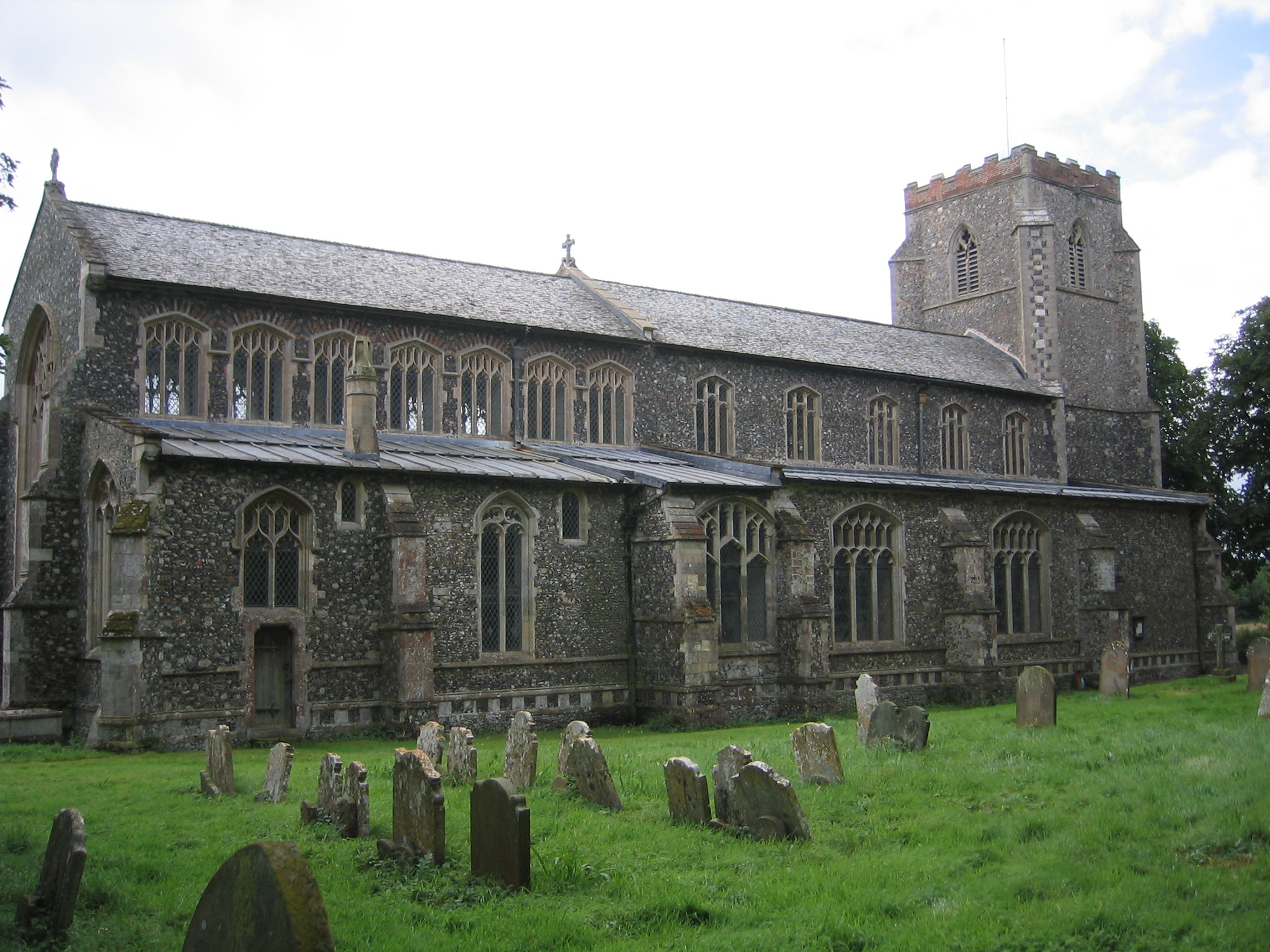
- St Andrew's Church at Wingfield

- Location within Suffolk
- Population: 345 (2011)
- District: Mid Suffolk
- Shire county: Suffolk
- Region: East
- Country: England
- Sovereign state: United Kingdom
- Post town: Diss
- Postcode district: IP21
- Dialling code: 01379

Wingfield is a village in the English county of Suffolk. It is found 7 miles (11 km) east of Diss, signposted off B1118, near Eye. The origin of the name Wingfield is unknown. It's likely it originated from Anglo-Saxon as the Old English word winga, meant a turn, corner or bend in the land and feld meant field. However other theories have been put forward including the name coming from the Wuffingas dynasty who were the ruling family in Norfolk and Suffolk in the 6th to 8th centuries. Wighefelda (field of Wigha's people) was also listed in the Domesday Book as within the Bishop's Hundred, later renamed the Hoxne Hundred.

The village has scattered buildings and includes several old houses such as the Grade II listed 16th-century former farmhouse "Old Hall" and the 14th-century Grade II listed "White House."

The most prominent family in the area was the Wingfield family, who took their surname after the village.

The village has a pub, The De La Pole Arms, across the road from the church.

== Wingfield Castle and Wingfield Family ==
Wingfield Castle, which is now a private house, was for many centuries the home of the Wingfield family and their heirs, the De La Poles, Earls and Dukes of Suffolk. The Wingfields were a very old family and one of them, Sir John de Wingfield, was chief of staff to the Black Prince. There were generations of Wingfields living in the village before him, however John was the eldest son of his father, another John de Wingfield, and it was his line that kept ownership of the castle. Sir John Wingfield was married to Alianore De Glanville and their one child, a daughter and sole heir, was Catherine who married Michael de la Pole, later 1st Earl of Suffolk. Thus Catherine lost the Wingfield surname and her married name, De La Pole, became synonymous with Wingfield Castle.

However, there were other Wingfields descended from John de Wingfield's brother, some of whom made important marriages such as Sir Richard Wingfield's marriage to Katherine Woodville (younger sister of Queen consort Elizabeth Woodville and sister-in-law of King Edward IV) and Charles Brandon, 1st Duke of Suffolk's marriage to Henry VIII's younger sister, Mary Tudor. The Wingfield descendants include Lady Jane Grey and two favourites of Henry VIII, the previously mentioned Charles Brandon, who was great-grandson of Sir Robert Wingfield and grandson of Elizabeth Wingfield, and Thomas Wolsey who was also a member of the Wingfield family from his mother, Joan Daundy. Much has been written of Wolsey's beginnings, but his mother's family (the Wingfields and Daundys) were wealthy and influential and assisted in his education and career.

Apart from Wingfield Castle, the Wingfield/De la Pole family owned, lived in or were governors of other castles some of which include Henham Hall, Eye Castle, Orford Castle and Framlingham Castle. They were also owners of Kimbolton Castle at the time when Catherine of Aragon lived there during the last few years of her life and where she died in 1536. Some castles were outside East Anglia including Fotheringhay Castle, Restormel Castle, Wallingford Castle, Tattershall Castle and Grimsthorpe Castle.

== Wingfield Church ==
The current Grade I listed St Andrew's church dates from 1362. Sir John de Wingfield left money in his will to replace the original church with one larger and more elaborate in the 14th-century.

The church contains fifteen 15th-century misericords. They have more than a family resemblance to those at Sutton Courtenay now in Oxfordshire, but pre-1974 in Berkshire, and those at Soham in Cambridgeshire.

An unusual feature of the church is the moveable 'hudd', which was a portable wooden shelter made during the Georgian period for a priest to shelter under if it was raining during a funeral or burial.

The church's Tudor organ has been reconstructed and tours the country. It features in the film The Elusive English Organ.

== Wingfield Church and Wingfield Family Tombs ==
The Wingfields continued to extend the church further throughout the centuries. Here visitors can see fine church monuments of Sir John de Wingfield, whose tomb lies within the chancel, and the De la Pole family.

The church contains the wooden effigies of Michael de la Pole, 2nd Earl of Suffolk (who was the eldest son of Michael de la Pole, 1st Earl of Suffolk and Catherine Wingfield) and his wife Katherine Stafford. This Earl died of dysentery at the Siege of Harfleur whilst with Henry V on his Agincourt campaign of 1415.

The Earl's son, also Michael, who was with his father, succeeded to the title but was killed a few weeks later whilst fighting under the King at the actual battle of Agincourt. The title then passed to the second son, William, who was aged fifteen at the time. William de la Pole, later first Duke of Suffolk, who was murdered after being exiled in 1450, was buried by his widow, Alice Chaucer (granddaughter of Geoffrey Chaucer) in the family church of the Charterhouse, Kingston upon Hull, as was his wish, and not in Wingfield church as is often stated.

Another notable tomb is the alabaster effigy of John de la Pole, 2nd Duke of Suffolk (Sir John's head lies on a Saracen's head and helmet) and his second wife Elizabeth of York, Duchess of Suffolk, sister to Edward IV and Richard III. John de la Pole's first wife was Lady Margaret Beaufort. They were married as children but never lived together and the marriage was dissolved.

== Later Years of the Wingfield Family ==
The son of John de la Pole and Elizabeth of York was John de la Pole, Earl of Lincoln. He was King Richard's heir and attempted to claim the English throne. His brother, Edmund de la Pole, 3rd Duke of Suffolk, followed him and was therefore imprisoned by his rival, King Henry VII. The dukedom was surrendered in 1493. Michel de Montaigne, in his Essays, criticised Henry VII for stating in his will for Suffolk to be executed after his own death, thinking that making his son do what he couldn't do, was an act of cowardice. After Henry VII's death, Henry VIII adhered to his father's will and Suffolk was beheaded, without trial, with the King then confiscating the castle and De La Pole estates for himself. But that wasn't the end for the Wingfield family. A year after Suffolk's death, another member of the Wingfield family, Charles Brandon was made Duke of Suffolk and the previously confiscated estates, including Wingfield Castle, reverted to the family.

Around 1520, at the time of the Field of the Cloth of Gold, the Wingfields, whose family motto was "Posse Nolle Nobile" (To have the power without the wish is noble) were in a powerful position with three members of the family being politically influential: Charles Brandon was Duke of Suffolk and married to the King's sister Mary Tudor; Sir Richard Wingfield was the English Ambassador to France; Thomas Wolsey was Cardinal and Lord Chancellor of England.

== Wingfield College ==
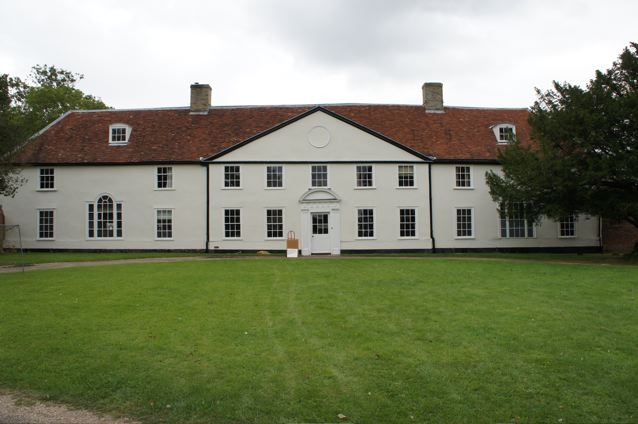
Wingfield College.

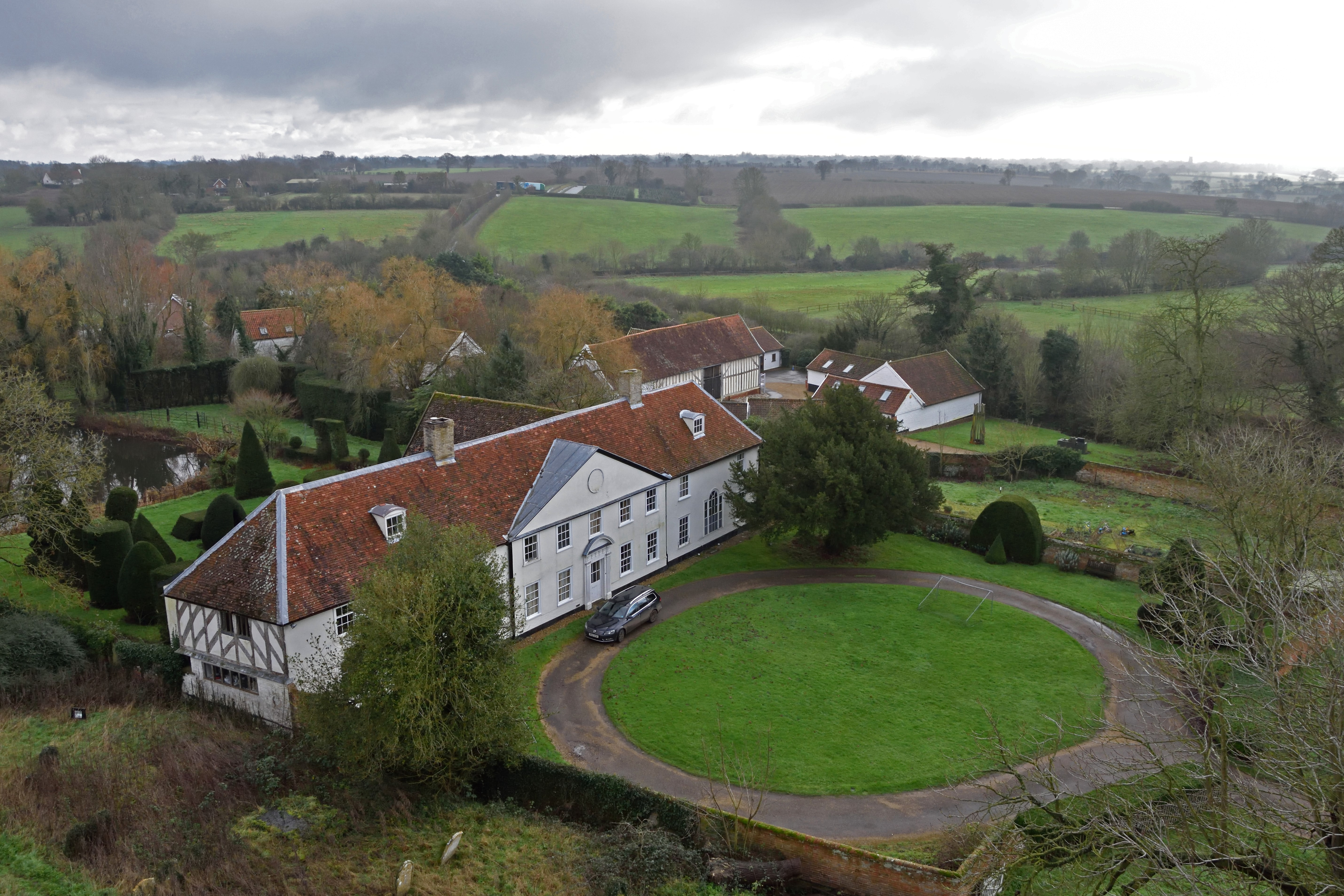
Wingfield College and Barns

Wingfield College is a remnant of the college founded by the will of Sir John de Wingfield in 1362, and endowed by the Black Prince in his will. The college had a master, nine secular chaplains and three choral scholarships for boys. These persons were required to live at the college, pray for Sir John, the Black Prince and Edward III, run a boarding school and minister to the parish. In 1542, however, the college was dissolved and a large part was demolished. The remaining wings were remodelled in Palladian style in the 18th century. It was not until a previous owner, Ian Chance, came into possession that restoration revealed the 14th-century structure. Since 1981 the adjacent Wingfield College Farm has run a regular series of concerts, recitals and lectures, with exhibitions including ceramics, textiles and contemporary art and a creative arts visitor centre, known as Wingfield Arts. This venture closed in 2003 due to lack of funding, but the restored buildings in 4 acres (16,000 m^{2}) of gardens, ponds, garden sculpture and a play garden re-opened in April 2009 as Wingfield Barns under the stewardship of Mid-Suffolk District Council. In 2009 a Community Interest Company (CIC) was formed to formally take on the leasehold of the buildings and run the artistic programming and venue hirings.

== Other burials ==
- John de la Pole, 2nd Duke of Suffolk
- Elizabeth of York, Duchess of Suffolk
