= Elizabeth of York, Duchess of Suffolk =

English noblewoman (1444 – c. 1503)

Elizabeth of York
- Duchess of Suffolk
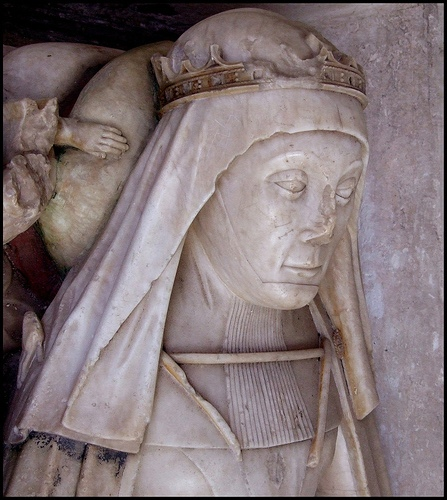
- Elizabeth Plantagenet, Duchess of Suffolk, detail from her effigy in St Andrew's Church, Wingfield, Suffolk
- Born: 22 April 1444; Rouen, Normandy, France
- Died: after January 1503 (aged ~58); Wingfield Castle, Suffolk, England
- Spouse: John de la Pole, 2nd Duke of Suffolk (m. 1458; died 1492)
- Issue: John de la Pole, 1st Earl of Lincoln; Geoffrey de la Pole; Edward de la Pole, Archdeacon of Richmond; Elizabeth de la Pole, Lady Morley; Edmund de la Pole, 3rd Duke of Suffolk; Dorothy de la Pole; Humphrey de la Pole; Anne de la Pole; Catherine de la Pole, Lady Stourton; William de la Pole; Richard de la Pole
- House: York
- Father: Richard Plantagenet, 3rd Duke of York
- Mother: Cecily Neville

Elizabeth of York, Duchess of Suffolk also known as Elizabeth Plantagenet (22 April 1444 – c. 1503) was the fifth child and second daughter of Richard Plantagenet, 3rd Duke of York (a great-grandson of King Edward III) and Cecily Neville. She was thus a sister of Edward IV and Richard III.

== Marriage ==
Sometime before February 1458, Elizabeth was married to John de la Pole. John was the eldest son of William de la Pole, 1st Duke of Suffolk and Alice Chaucer. His maternal grandparents were Thomas Chaucer and Maud Burghersh.

Her father-in-law had served as the principal power behind the throne for Henry VI of England from 1447 to 1450. His three years in this position saw the near-complete loss of the English possessions in northern France, towards the end of Hundred Years' War. Suffolk could not avoid taking the fall for the failure. He had been imprisoned in the Tower of London and had been attainted. Consequently, John had not succeeded to his titles when his father was executed on 2 May 1450.

Her older brother Edward IV of England restored his brother-in-law to the title of Duke of Suffolk in 1463. She remained the Duchess of Suffolk until his death in 1491/1492. They were settled in Wingfield, Suffolk.

She survived her husband by almost a decade. She is last mentioned alive in January 1503. She was mentioned being deceased by May 1504. She is buried in the church in Wingfield, Suffolk.

== Issue ==
With Suffolk, she had the following children:

- John de la Pole, 1st Earl of Lincoln (c. 1462 – 16 June 1487). He was designated heir to his maternal uncle Richard III. Married Margaret FitzAlan, the niece of Elizabeth Woodville. They had no children. Rebelled against Henry VII and was killed at the Battle of Stoke Field.
- Geoffrey de la Pole (b. 1464). Holy Orders.
- Edward de la Pole (1466–1485). Archdeacon of Richmond.
- Elizabeth de la Pole (c. 1468 – 1489). Married to Henry Lovel, 8th Baron Morley (1466–1489), without issue.
- Edmund de la Pole, 3rd Duke of Suffolk (1471 – 30 April 1513). Yorkist pretender in succession to his brother John. Beheaded by order of Henry VIII.
- Dorothy de la Pole (b. 1472). Died young.
- Humphrey de la Pole (1474–1513). In Holy Orders.
- Anne de la Pole (1476–1501). Seventh Prioress of Sion Abbey
- Catherine de la Pole (c. 1477–1513). Married to William Stourton, 5th Baron Stourton, without issue.
- Sir William de la Pole, Knight, of Wingfield Castle (1478–1539). William was kept in the Tower of London, his date of death is generally regarded as being during late 1539, either October or November. Married Katherine Stourton, no issue.
- Richard de la Pole (1480 – 24 February 1525). Yorkist pretender in succession to Edmund. Killed at the Battle of Pavia.

== Ancestry ==
Ancestors of Elizabeth of York, Duchess of Suffolk

8. Edmund of Langley, 1st Duke of York
4. Richard of Conisburgh, 3rd Earl of Cambridge
9. Isabella of Castile
2. Richard of York, 3rd Duke of York
10. Roger Mortimer, 4th Earl of March
5. Anne de Mortimer
11. Alianore Holland
1. Elizabeth of York
12. John Neville, 3rd Baron Neville
6. Ralph Neville, 1st Earl of Westmorland
13. Maud Percy
3. Cecily Neville
14. John of Gaunt, 1st Duke of Lancaster
7. Joan Beaufort
15. Katherine Swynford
