= Richard de la Pole =

Pretender to the English crown (died 1525)

- Arms of Edmund de la Pole 3rd Duke of Suffolk
- Born: Unknown; England
- Died: 24 February 1525; Pavia, Duchy of Milan
- Known for: Being last member of the House of York to actively and openly seek the crown of England
- Children: Marguerite de la Pole (illegitimate)
- Parent(s): John de la Pole, 2nd Duke of Suffolk and Elizabeth of York, Duchess of Suffolk
- Relatives: Richard III of England (uncle)

Richard de la Pole (died 24 February 1525) was a pretender to the English crown. Commonly nicknamed "White Rose", he was the last Yorkist claimant to actively and openly seek the crown of England. He lived in exile after many of his relatives were executed, becoming allied with Louis XII of France in the War of the League of Cambrai. Louis saw him as a more favourable ally and prospect for an English king than Henry VIII.

During 1514, the stage was set for a Yorkist reclaiming of England under Richard. He was in Brittany with 12,000 mercenaries set for the invasion, leading his army to St. Malo; however, France and England made peace just as they were about to embark and it was thus called off. Later, with Francis I as king, Richard struck up an alliance in 1523 and planned a Yorkist invasion of England once again. However, this never came to fruition, as Richard died fighting alongside Francis I at the Battle of Pavia two years later.

== Family ==
He was the seventh and youngest son of John de la Pole, 2nd Duke of Suffolk and his wife Elizabeth of York. His mother was the second of the three surviving daughters of Richard Plantagenet, 3rd Duke of York and Cecily Neville. She was a younger sister to Edward IV of England, as well as Edmund, Earl of Rutland and Anne of York, Duchess of Exeter, and an older sister to Margaret of York, George Plantagenet, 1st Duke of Clarence and Richard III of England.

His paternal grandparents were William de la Pole, 1st Duke of Suffolk and Alice Chaucer. Suffolk was an important English soldier and commander in the Hundred Years' War, and later Lord Chamberlain of England. He also appears prominently in William Shakespeare's Henry VI, Part 1 and Henry VI, Part 2.

Alice Chaucer was a daughter of Thomas Chaucer and Maud Burghersh. Thomas was the Speaker of the English House of Commons on three occasions, Chief Butler of England for almost thirty years, attended fifteen parliaments and was Speaker of the House five times, a feat not surpassed until the 18th century.

Thomas was a son of Geoffrey Chaucer and his wife Philippa (de) Roet. Geoffrey was an English author, poet, philosopher, bureaucrat (courtier) and diplomat. He is sometimes called the father of English literature. Although he wrote many works, he is best remembered for his unfinished frame narrative The Canterbury Tales. He is also credited by some scholars with being the first author to demonstrate the artistic legitimacy of the vernacular English language, rather than French or Latin.

== Yorkist heir ==
His eldest brother John de la Pole, 1st Earl of Lincoln (c. 1464 – 1487), may have been named heir to the throne by his maternal uncle, Richard III of England, who gave him a pension and the reversion of the estates of Lady Margaret Beaufort. However, on the accession of Henry VII following the Battle of Bosworth Field in 1485, Lincoln took the oath of allegiance instead of claiming the throne for himself.

In 1487, Lincoln joined the rebellion of Lambert Simnel and was killed at the Battle of Stoke Field, Nottinghamshire. The second brother, Edmund (c. 1471 – 1513), succeeded his father while still in his minority. His estates suffered under the attainder of his brother, and he was compelled to pay large sums to Henry VII for the recovery of part of the forfeited lands, and also to exchange his title of duke for that of earl. In 1501 he sought out Maximilian I, Holy Roman Emperor, in Tyrol and received from him a promise of substantial assistance in case of an attempt on the English crown.

In consequence of these treasonable proceedings Henry VII seized Edmund's brother William, with four other Yorkist noblemen. Two of them, Sir James Tyrrell and Sir John Wyndham, were executed; William de la Pole was imprisoned; and Edmund de la Pole, 3rd Duke of Suffolk, was outlawed. Then in July 1502 Henry VII concluded a treaty with Maximilian by which the Emperor bound himself not to countenance English rebels. Presently Suffolk fell into the hands of Philip I of Castile, who imprisoned him at Namur and in 1506 surrendered him to Henry VII, on condition that his life was spared. He remained a prisoner until 1513, when he was beheaded by Henry VIII at the time his brother Richard took up arms with the French king.

Richard de la Pole joined Edmund abroad in 1504, and remained at Aix-la-Chapelle as surety for his elder brother's debts. The creditors threatened to surrender him to Henry VII but, more fortunate than his brother, he found a safe refuge at Buda with King Ladislaus II of Bohemia and Hungary.

He was excluded from the general pardon proclaimed at the accession of Henry VIII, and when Louis XII of France went to war with the Kingdom of England in 1512, he recognised Edmund's pretensions to the English crown and gave Richard a command in the French army. In 1513, after the execution of Edmund, he assumed the title of Earl of Suffolk. In 1514 he was given 12,000 German mercenaries, ostensibly for the defence of Brittany, but really for an invasion of England. These he led to St. Malo, but the conclusion of peace with England prevented their embarcation. Richard was required to leave France, and he established himself at Metz, in Lorraine, and built the La Haute Pierre palace on the Saint-Symphorien island.

While at Metz, he was visited by Pierre Alamire, the German-Netherlandish composer and music copyist, who was a spy for Henry VIII. However, Richard employed Alamire as a counter-spy against Henry, and Alamire, on being suspected of unreliability by Cardinal Thomas Wolsey and Henry VIII, never returned to England.

Richard de la Pole had numerous interviews with King Francis I of France, and in 1523 he was permitted, in concert with John Stewart, 2nd Duke of Albany, the Scottish regent, to arrange an invasion of England, which was never carried out.

He was with Francis I at the Battle of Pavia on 24 February 1525, where he was killed and was buried in the basilica San Pietro in Ciel d'Oro. In a picture of the battle, preserved at the Ashmolean Museum at Oxford, his lifeless body is represented in the thick of the combat with the inscription Le Duc de Susfoc dit Blance Rose (The Duke of Suffolk, known as White Rose).

== Children ==
Richard de la Pole was never known to have married, but he is known to have had a daughter by a mistress. It has been suggested that she may have been Marie of Sicily.

- Marguerite de la Pole who was lady of honour to Marguerite of Angoulême, Queen of Navarre. On 21 May 1539, Marguerite de la Pole signed a marriage contract to Sibeud de Tivoley, seigneur de Brenieu, in the presence of the Queen and her kinsman Gabriel, Marquis of Saluzzo. Tivoley was esquire ordinaire of Queen Eleanore of Austria. Tivoley was still living in 1547, but died before 1568.

Marguerite and her husband had three sons and five daughters:

- Jean, Seigneur of Brenieu in Vivarais.
- Pierre, became a priest and Canon of Saint Denis.
- Claude, who also became a priest and Canon of Évry.
- Catherine, wife of Gilbert de Colomb.
- Eleanore, wife of Jean de Secondat de Montesquieu, seigneur of Roques. The political philosopher Charles-Louis de Secondat, Baron de La Brède et de Montesquieu was one of her descendants.
- Marguerite, wife of Claude d'Orgeoise, seigneur of Montferrier.
- Louise, wife of Jean de Montchenu.
- Sebastienne, wife of Andre Bérenger du Gua.

Marguerite de la Pole's will was dated 1599.

== Sources ==
- Cunningham, Sean. "Pole, Richard de la (d. 1525)". Oxford Dictionary of National Biography (online ed.). Oxford University Press. doi:10.1093/ref:odnb/22458. (Subscription, Wikipedia Library access or UK public library membership required.)

Titles in pretence
| Preceded by Edmund de la Pole | — TITULAR — King of England; Lord of Ireland; Yorkist claimant 1513–1525; Reason for succession failure: Dynasty deposed by Tudors | Extinction of Yorkist claim |
