= John de la Pole, 2nd Duke of Suffolk =

English nobleman (1442–1492)

John de la Pole
- Duke of Suffolk
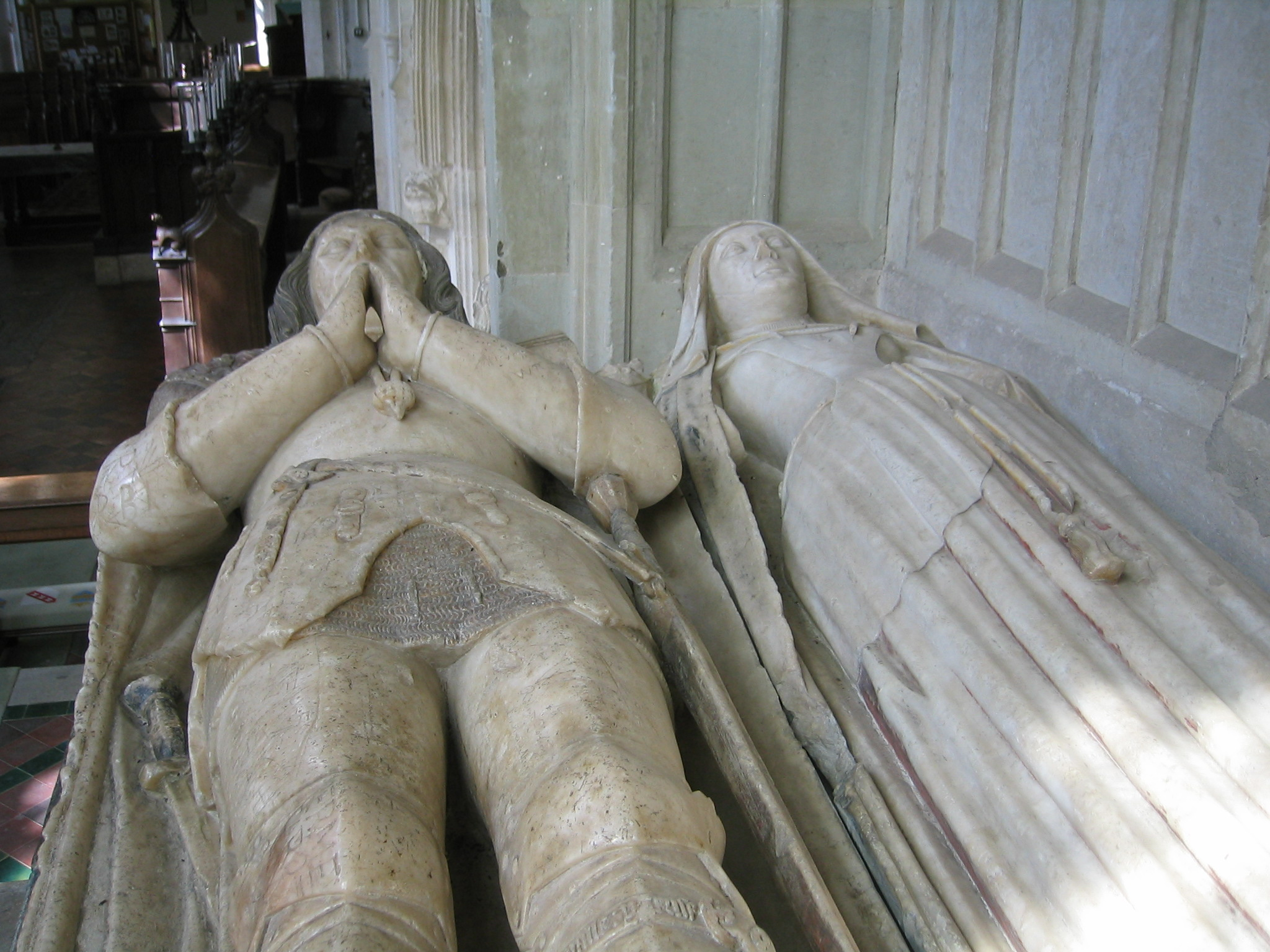
- Effigies of John de la Pole, 2nd Duke of Suffolk, KG, and his wife, in Wingfield Church, Suffolk. He wears the Garter below his left knee

Duke of Suffolk
- Born: 27 September 1442
- Died: 14–21 May 1492 (aged 49)
- Buried: Wingfield, Suffolk
- Spouses: Lady Margaret Beaufort (m. 1450; ann. 1453) Elizabeth of York (m. 1458)
- Issue more...: John de la Pole, 1st Earl of Lincoln; Edmund de la Pole, 3rd Duke of Suffolk; William de la Pole; Richard de la Pole
- Father: William de la Pole, 1st Duke of Suffolk
- Mother: Alice Chaucer

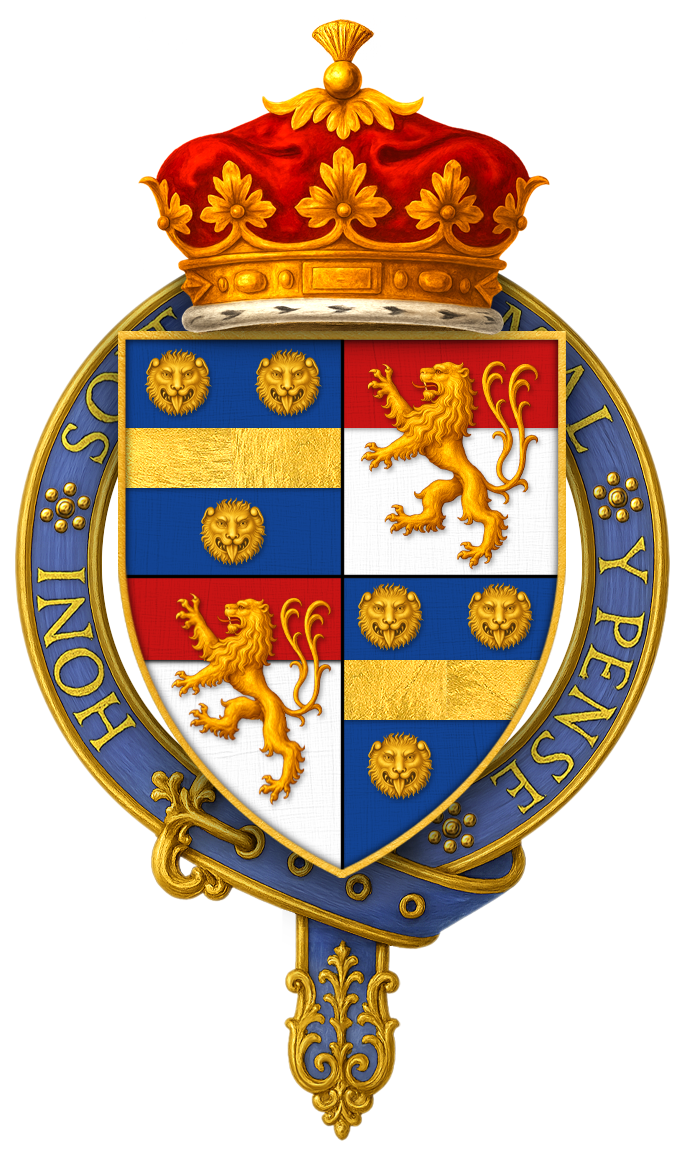
Garter-encircled Arms of Sir John de la Pole, 2nd Duke of Suffolk, KG

John de la Pole, 2nd Duke of Suffolk, KG (27 September 1442 – 14–21 May 1492), was a major magnate in 15th-century England. He was the son of William de la Pole, 1st Duke of Suffolk, and Alice Chaucer, the daughter of Thomas Chaucer (thus making John the great-grandson of the poet Geoffrey Chaucer). His youth was blighted, in 1450, by the political fall and subsequent murder of his father, who had been a favourite of king Henry VI but was increasingly distrusted by the rest of the nobility. Although the first duke of Suffolk had made himself rich through trade and – particularly – royal grants, this source of income dried up on his death, so John de la Pole was among the poorest of English dukes on his accession to the title in 1463. This was a circumstance which John felt acutely; on more than one occasion, he refused to come to London due to his impoverishment being such that he could not afford the costs of maintaining a retinue.

As a youth, John de la Pole married twice; his first marriage was annulled, but his second marriage, to Elizabeth of York, made him the brother-in-law of two kings, Edward IV and Richard III. It brought him eleven children, the eldest of whom, John, would eventually be named heir to Richard III in 1484 and die in battle in the Yorkist cause. John de la Pole, though, generally managed to steer clear of involvement in the tumultuous events of the Wars of the Roses. Although he was politically aligned to the House of York by virtue of his marriage, he avoided participating in the battles of the 1450s, not taking up arms until Edward IV had claimed the throne. De la Pole appears to have spent much of this period, in fact, feuding with his East Anglian neighbours, the Paston family over an inheritance – even interfering in parliamentary elections, for example, in an attempt to gain the upper hand.

Suffolk did not receive major grants from Edward IV either, although de la Pole continued to support him in arms when necessary, and when Edward lost his throne in 1470, Suffolk was not trusted by the new Lancastrian regime. Suffolk fought for Edward at the battles of Barnet and Tewkesbury but did not join Edward's inner circle during his second reign. He seems to have acquiesced in the accession of Richard III in 1483, but, unlike his son, was not present for Richard III's defeat at the Battle of Bosworth two years later. Henry VII does not seem to have held Suffolk's son's treason against the duke, and even seems to have protected him from the former's attainder. John de la Pole died in 1492 and was buried at Wingfield Church, Suffolk.

== Youth ==
John de la Pole was born on 27 September 1442, only son and heir to William de la Pole, 1st Duke of Suffolk, and Alice Chaucer, the granddaughter of the poet Geoffrey Chaucer. John was therefore still only a child of seven when, on 7 February 1450, he was married to the six-year-old Lady Margaret Beaufort, though the Papal dispensation to marry was not signed until 18 August 1450.

The earldom of Suffolk, says historian Michael Hicks, was 'not particularly well-endowed,' probably only just scraping the £666 qualifying income for that rank. His mother, though, held substantial estates in her own right, from her father, Sir Thomas Chaucer. Furthermore, because this was Alice's third marriage, she held large dowers from both previous husbands, the second of whom had been Thomas Montagu, 4th Earl of Salisbury.

Arms of De la Pole: Azure, a fess between three leopard's faces or

John's father augmented the family's position by exploiting the favour of the King, Henry VI, to whom he was an important councillor in the 1440s. Already Earl of Suffolk, John's father was in turn elevated to a marquess (in 1444) and then Duke of Suffolk (1448), and with these titles received major grants from the crown. Also, it had been his father's receipt of the wardship of Margaret Beaufort from the king that enabled John's marriage to her, whilst both were still infants and despite them being within the prohibited degrees of consanguinity. Contemporaries claimed that the marriage to the daughter of John Beaufort, Duke of Somerset (cousin of the-then childless king), was intended to make John de la Pole an eventual heir to the crown; this is considered unlikely by modern historians, who have pointed at indications that the King supported William in these plans. It has been suggested that the marriage was the direct result of William's political difficulties during the 1450–1451 parliament.

=== Father's downfall ===
Any plans his father had for John were rudely upset in 1450 when Suffolk was impeached by parliament over the loss of Normandy in the Hundred Years' War. Suffolk was exiled, but never reached the continent as he was murdered by sailors in the Channel soon after his departure. On 30 April 1450, before he sailed from Ipswich, the disgraced duke wrote a letter to John in which he urged his son to "flee the company and council of proude men, of coveitows men and of fateryng men".

Since Suffolk had never been formally convicted, he was not attainted, but the royal grants which had given John de la Pole such good prospects were now resumed to the crown. And although John inherited his father's dukedom of Suffolk, he had lost the various offices that he had held, such as the constableship of Wallingford Castle. On top of this, due to his mother retaining one-third of his father's estate in dower, his expectations from the dukedom could only have been even smaller. His income has been estimated at less than £280 per annum, which was less than the minimum required for an earl, let alone a duke.

John de la Pole did not come of age until 1463. As such, in 1450 his wardship was resumed to the crown, and custody of his estates granted to others by the king. His marriage to Margaret Beaufort was annulled, in February 1453. A recent biographer of her son (the later King Henry VII) has described them as being married "only nominally", and elsewhere as a "hasty measure destined not to last".

== Early career ==
John de la Pole started being included in commissions from around 1457. One of these, to Oxfordshire in July 1457, was to suppress "congregations and unlawful gatherings against the king"; since he was still only fifteen this was probably a symbolic position. Sometime before February 1458, in a match arranged, it appears by his mother, John married Elizabeth, the second surviving daughter of Richard of York and Cecily, née Neville. The marriage took place at a politically turbulent time. The First Battle of St Albans had taken place less than three years earlier, and the king was attempting make a peace between York and his allies (who had won the battle) and the families of those lords who had died there. York after all had been a bitter enemy of John's father—indeed, it had been mainly thanks to York that impeachment proceedings were brought against Suffolk in 1450.

=== Marriage ===
Biographer J.A.F. Thomson posits that "although he was not of such major importance, the young John de la Pole was a good catch for a magnate who wished wealth and dignity for a daughter". With her, Elizabeth brought a marriage portion of about £1533. This was not to make Suffolk rich. Not only was it not that much compared to other dowries of the period, but York, whose wages from his various offices were almost permanently in arrears, often could not keep up the instalments. York had pledged payment in bonds to Alice over four years, on the proviso that his daughter did not die in the meantime.

=== East Anglian affairs and feud with the Pastons ===
Much of Suffolk's early activity in East Anglian local politics was probably at the instigation of his mother, Alice, and he would later spend as much of his adult life at her manor of Ewelme as he did at his own manors. Suffolk played a prominent role in Commissions of the Peace in Norfolk and Suffolk, and these became a permanent position from 1464. On at least two occasions, Suffolk attempted to affect the outcome of a local parliamentary election, and the appointment of the county sheriff. Furthermore, he was a justice of the peace in Berkshire and Oxfordshire in the later 1460s.

He involved himself in some of the most controversial episodes in East Anglian society of the time, for instance, attempting to purchase part of the by-then somewhat infamous Fastolf inheritance in 1461. This was another occasion in fact where we may in fact see his mother's guiding hand at work, as she is known to have been canvassing for support at court for such an outcome, and even Margaret Paston believed her to be personally behind the attacks. Both of them were involved in a severe feud with the Paston family as a result of conflicting interests in the Fastolf inheritance.

The duke also made other disputed (and in some cases outrightly illegal) claims to other properties in the region over the following decade, and in 1465, a group of his retainers destroyed the manor house of Hellesdon in Norfolk, ransacking its church. For these and other illegalities alleged by contemporaries, Suffolk escaped retribution, probably due to his royal connections. On the other hand, he was never able to use such connections to his advantage and persuade the king to intercede in any disputes on the duke's behalf.

== Wars of the Roses ==
Although King Henry doubtless intended to tie political opponents together, John's marriage to Elizabeth of York may have had the unintended consequence of tying Suffolk to York's future opposition of Henry. And, as Hicks says, Suffolk "once again hazarded the future of his House" by involvement in national politics.

The year following John's marriage to Elizabeth, York's political opposition to Henry had become an armed campaign. Following their rout at Ludford Bridge in October 1459, Suffolk's father-in-law York and brother-in-law Edward, Earl of March, and allies had been forced into exile and attainted at the Coventry parliament. Suffolk himself appears to have taken no part in York's military campaign.

But, according to one contemporary chronicler, at the same parliament, Suffolk was stripped of his dukedom and reduced to the rank of earl, because he had married the daughter of York. Official records continued to refer to John as duke, and in any case, as he was still strictly a minor, and not in official receipt of any of his titles, it may not have been true. Or, if it did happen, it may well have been on the grounds of his fiscal inability to uphold the status of a duke.

In 1460, the last year of Lancastrian rule, John was appointed a justice of the peace, but this was insufficient to prevent him taking the Yorkists' side, which, after the Battle of Wakefield on 30 December 1460, came under the control of the dead duke of York's eldest surviving son, Edward, Earl of March.

John seems to have regarded himself from the age of eighteen as a potential force in English politics, and in the late 1450s seems to have deliberately avoided intimating support for either faction. However, by early 1461 Suffolk had come down firmly on York's side. He fought alongside Richard, Earl of Warwick, at the second battle of St Albans in February 1461, and at the Battle of Towton in March, which resulted in a crushing defeat for the Lancastrian army. As a result of this victory, Suffolk's cousin (and brother-in-law) Edward was proclaimed king as Edward IV of England, and Suffolk acted as Lord Steward at the coronation.

== Later career ==
=== Under Edward IV ===
One of de la Pole's first commissions under the new regime was to accompany Edward on his campaign against the Scots in winter 1462, although he had returned to Norwich by early the next year. Suffolk also attended the reinterment of the king's uncle and cousins, Richard, Earl of Salisbury, and his son Thomas at Bisham Priory in 1463. Soon after, Suffolk's dukedom was confirmed to him by Edward IV in letters patent dated 23 March (possibly, it has been suggested, on account of contemporary uncertainty as to whether he ever had been downgraded in 1460). He actually took seisin of his estates six months before coming of age, and was absolved from having to prove his age as was the legal custom. He was a trier of petitions at the parliament later that year. In 1465, the king granted Suffolk an annuity of 100 marks (nearly £67) a year, although this was only during the life of his wife, the king's sister. It may only have been compensation for lands lost by Edward's need to endow his queen with a landed estate. Two years later, in a clear mark of royal favour, his eldest son John was created Earl of Lincoln. Suffolk himself regained his father's Wallingford and Chiltern Hundreds offices, with a £40 per annum salary for it. In 1467, he acted as feoffee for his sister-in-law (the King's sister), Anne, Duchess of Exeter.

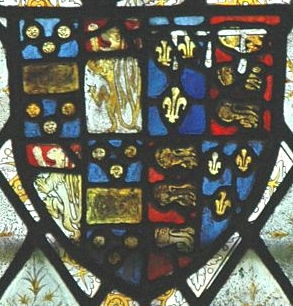
Church of St Mary the Virgin, Iffley, Oxfordshire, 15th-century stained glass of the arms of John de la Pole, 2nd Duke of Suffolk (1442–1491/2), KG. Arms: Quarterly, 1st & 4th: Azure a fess between three leopard's faces or (de la Pole, (here shown with six leopard's faces)); 2nd & 3rd: Argent, a chief gules over all a lion rampant double queued or (Burghersh of Ewelme); Impaling the royal arms of England with label of three points argent, the arms of his 2nd wife Elizabeth of York. Crest: A Saracen's head gules, beard and hair gold, with a jewelled fillet about the brows

Although Suffolk was receiving minimal financial benefit from the new regime, he still took conspicuous part in all the major state ceremonies. Such events ranged from the 1465 royal wedding to tournaments such as that between Lord Scales and the Bastard of Burgundy in 1467. By this time the king's relations with the powerful Earl of Warwick had soured to the point that the discontented earl was fomenting rebellion against Edward. Suffolk remained loyal to his brother-in-law, and appears to have taken no part in the Neville/Woodville feud that occupied much of the second half of the decade. Suffolk participated at the Battle of Empingham in 1470 and particularly helped the king crush the Lincolnshire Rebellion the same year. Edward was subsequently forced into exile however, and Suffolk appears not to have been trusted by the resurgent Lancastrian government, possibly because he refused to come to London to meet the chancellor, even if he appears to have come rapidly to terms with the new government personally. His wife kept in touch with her exiled brothers in Burgundy. When Edward IV returned to England in March 1471, de la Pole joined him on that campaign, in which Edward regained his throne. Thus Suffolk also took part in the battles of Barnet (at which Warwick was killed) and Tewkesbury (at which the House of York finally crushed the remnants of the Lancastrian army).

Following Tewkesbury, Suffolk was granted the estates of the under-age Francis, Viscount Lovell during Lovell's minority, and may have received the custody of the ex-Lancastrian Queen, Margaret of Anjou, in 1472, since Margaret was held at one point in Wallingford and subsequently in Ewelme. This was followed by a number of other offices and promotions, none of which were lucrative. In 1472 he was appointed High Steward of Oxford University and the following year made a Knight of the Garter. He was also the King's Lieutenant of Ireland (in later centuries the post came to be known as the Lord Lieutenant of Ireland) between March and July 1478 (although he probably never took the position in person). So little, in fact, had his financial situation improved, that in the first parliament after Edward's return from exile—in 1471—Suffolk refused his summons to attend parliament. This was because he felt himself unable to sustain the status and maintain the retinue of a royal duke in London for whatever duration the parliament turned out to be. With the exception of the Lovell estates Suffolk received no major grants, in stark comparison to Edward's brothers George, Duke of Clarence, and Richard, Duke of Gloucester, and even the king's Woodville in-laws. Suffolk's continuing poverty was reflected in the fact that, although he again took loyal part in King Edward's 1475 French campaign (on possibly the only occasion he ever went abroad), he could muster only forty men-at-arms and 300 archers. Michael Hicks remarks that, as a retinue, this "fell far short of those of other royal dukes". Soon after his return from France his mother, the Duchess Alice, died; certainly by 15 August 1476, when John finally came into possession of her dower lands, and by extension, finally, his whole estate. She was buried at Ewelme, Oxfordshire, in a "stunning alabaster monument".

=== Under Richard III and Henry VII ===
Edward IV died suddenly in April 1483, leaving his young son, Edward his heir and the Duke of Gloucester Lord Protector of the new king and the country. Although he had been summoned to the parliament of January 1483, it is unlikely that Suffolk was in attendance at court at the time. Nor did he attend the dead king's funeral or interment. By July, the young king had been declared illegitimate; Suffolk was at Westminster Hall on 26 June 1483 when Gloucester claimed the throne, and he carried the royal sceptre at Richard's coronation. Suffolk's son, the Earl of Lincoln, may have been named Richard III's heir to the throne when the king's own son, Edward of Middleham died in 1484. However, Suffolk did lose the Constableship of Wallingford and the Chiltern Hundreds to Lovell. In fact, Suffolk seems to have been no more favoured by Richard than he had been by Edward. In December 1483 Suffolk was summoned to the parliament which confirmed Richard III's right to the throne, and the following year he undertook commissions of array in both Norfolk and Suffolk, as well as being part of the oyer and terminer which condemned the treasons of William Collingbourne in London.

In August 1485 Henry Tudor invaded England. The duke, like so many of his peers, failed to participate at the Battle of Bosworth Field, unlike Lincoln, who fought for the king. Neither of them were sanctioned for any part they had played in the previous regimes. Indeed, Suffolk almost immediately regained Wallingford (since Lovell had been attainted after Bosworth), and played an active role in Henry VII's first parliament. In October 1485, de la Pole raised men against rebels in Norfolk who had been "associating" with the Scots. The following year, Lincoln took part in Lambert Simnel's rebellion in 1487, possibly with the intention of claiming the throne himself. Confronting Henry's army at the Battle of Stoke Field, Lincoln was killed in the fighting. Soon after Henry's accession, Suffolk, with the rest of the nobility, was forced to subscribe to royal diktat not to distribute livery or assemble great retinues. Back in East Anglia, however, Suffolk continued to raise forces against those he believed to be in possession of manors claimed by the duke.

== Last years and death ==
Notwithstanding the rebellion and death in battle against the king of Suffolk's son and heir, the duke does not seem to have lost the trust of King Henry. He was once again appointed trier at the 1487 parliament, and mustered men for Henry's expedition the next year. Around the same time he also lost the constableship of Wallingford again. Although Suffolk did not actually lose much under Henry Tudor, his heirs were to suffer. At the 1487 parliament that Suffolk attended, Lincoln was attainted for treason; Suffolk kept his own lands and also those he had granted Lincoln; but this was only for his life, and on de la Pole's death, these estates were to revert to the crown. This was not long to be effected. Although Suffolk seems still to have been alive on 14 May 1492, when he sat as county justice of the peace (JP) he was certainly dead six days later. He was buried, wearing the mantle of the Order of the Garter, in the college he founded at Wingfield in Suffolk in a 'splendid' tomb which belied the "discreet obscurity" in which he had spent his final years. His head rests on a helm surmounted by the Saracen head crest of the de la Pole family which appears "with wavy hair bound with a jewelled fillet and ear ring in the right ear". Elizabeth, who died later, was buried next to him wearing a widow's barbe.

=== Tomb ===
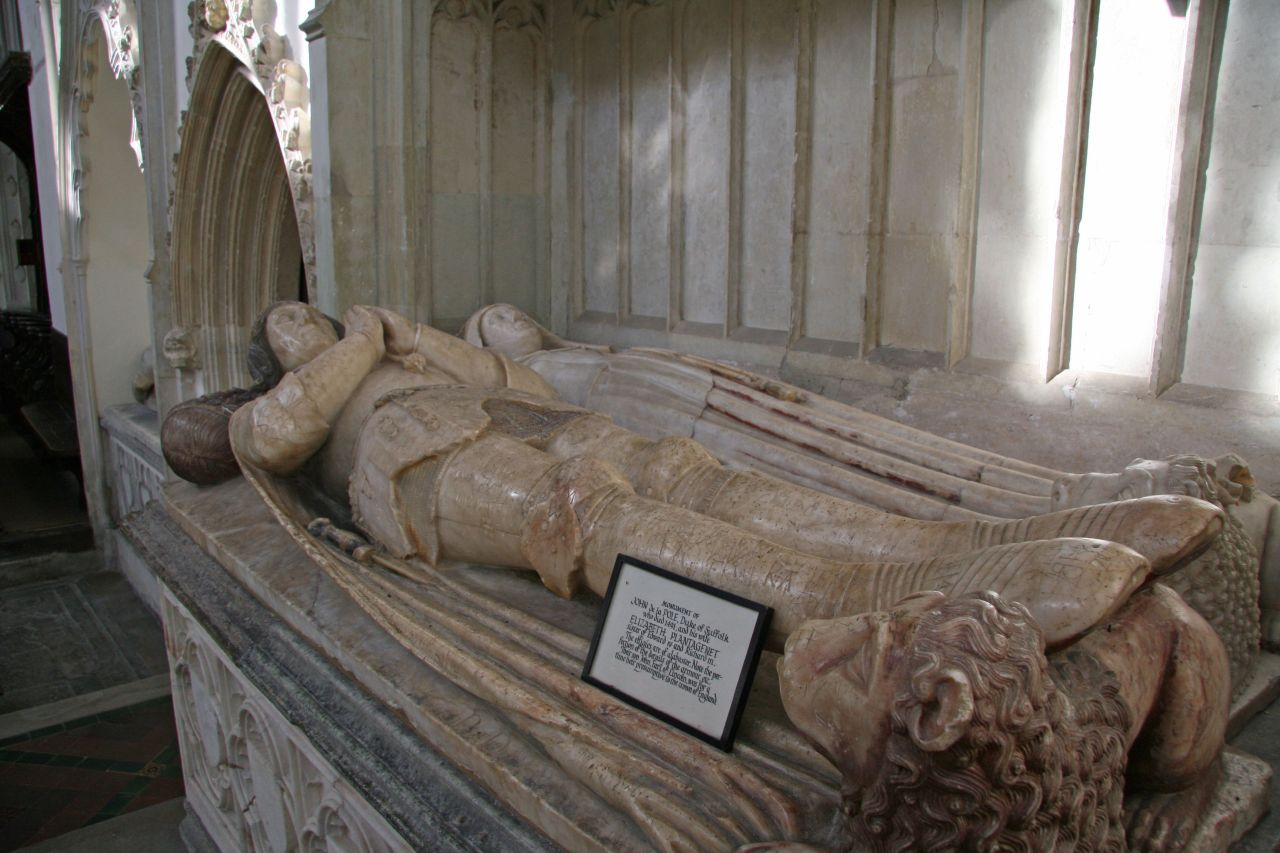
Effigies of John de la Pole, 2nd Duke of Suffolk, KG, and his wife, in Wingfield Church, Suffolk.

Suffolk's tomb in St Andrew's Chapel of Wingfield church depicts him in effigy wearing a ducal robe and coronet. Historians have noted the difference between Suffolk's effigy and surviving effigies of some of his contemporaries (such as the Earl of Salisbury, for example, who is depicted on his tomb as merely a knight). It has been suggested that the nobility in general—and Suffolk in particular—were increasingly anxious "to set themselves apart from their social inferiors", even at burial. The tomb also bears what has been described by one antiquary as one of the "most beautiful representations" of both the Order and mantle of the Garter worn by fifteenth-century noblemen. It was complete with funeral armour, line of cresting, and his and his wife's faces were both done as portraits, and has been described elsewhere as "one of the finest examples" of the figure of a robed Knight of the Garter with his Lady.

== Children ==
He had eleven known children, all by Elizabeth.

- John, Earl of Lincoln (c. 1462–16 June 1487), was the eldest and his heir. Eventually, due to King Richard III losing his own son, he became heir to his maternal uncle's throne. Following Richard's death at Bosworth Field, Lincoln rebelled against the new king Henry VII, and was killed at the Battle of Stoke.
- Geoffrey, born circa 1464, but died young.
- Edward (1466–1485) joined the church and became Archdeacon of Richmond.
- Elizabeth (c. 1468–1489), married Henry Lovel, 8th Baron Morley (1466–1489), and had no issue.
- Edmund (1471–30 April 1513), eventually inherited his father's dukedom, and had to bargain energetically with the king and pay a substantial amount before it was granted. He eventually became a Yorkist pretender to the crown of Henry VIII, who had him beheaded.
- Dorothy, born in 1472, died young,
- Humphrey (1474–1513) took Holy Orders
- Anne (1476–1495) became a nun.
- Katherine (c. 1477–1513), married William, Baron Stourton, with whom she had no issue.
- Sir William de la Pole (1478–1539)
- Richard de la Pole (1480–1525)

John de la Pole's two youngest sons, William and Richard, both seem to have been involved in a plot against Henry VII that was discovered in 1501. Sir William, of Wingfield Castle, was imprisoned in the Tower of London for thirty-seven years. Before this he had married Katherine Stourton; she was twenty years older than he was, and they had no issue. The youngest son, Richard, managed to escape to France on the discovery of the 1501 plot. Taking part in France's campaigns during the Italian Wars, he was killed at the Battle of Pavia, 24 February 1525.

Political offices
Preceded by George Plantagenet, 1st Duke of Clarence	King's Lieutenant of Ireland; March to July 1478	Succeeded by Richard of Shrewsbury, Duke of York
Peerage of England
Preceded by William de la Pole	Duke of Suffolk; 1463-1491	Succeeded by Edmund de la Pole
Preceded by Alice Chaucer, Duchess of Suffolk	Holder of the Honour of Wallingford; Constable of Wallingford Castle	Succeeded by Richard Grey
