= The Writing on the Hearth =

1971 novel by Cynthia Harnett

- First edition cover
- Author: Cynthia Harnett
- Illustrator: Gareth Floyd
- Language: English
- Genre: Children's historical novel
- Publisher: Methuen
- Publication date: 1971
- Publication place: United Kingdom

The Writing on the Hearth is a children's historical novel by Cynthia Harnett and illustrated by Gareth Floyd. It was first published in 1971 and was reissued in a special edition by Ewelme School in 2002.

== Setting ==
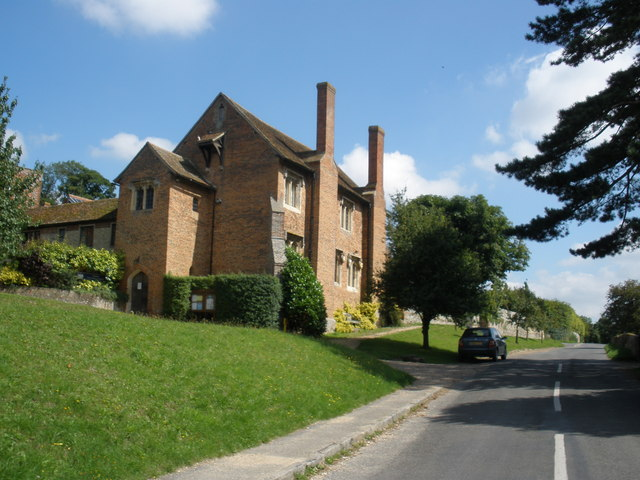
Ewelme School

The events of the novel take place in the 15th century and primarily in the village of Ewelme in Oxfordshire, England. It is part of a tetralogy, or a four-part story, each of which is self-contained. The story features the village school, built by Alice Chaucer, granddaughter of Geoffrey Chaucer, and the adjoining village church. At the time of setting (1437) the school was newly built, one of the first brick-built buildings in the country. The buildings are still in use as a school, making it the oldest school building still in permanent use in the UK, possibly in the world.

== Characters ==
- Stephen is a boy whose mother and father are dead and who is sponsored by the local lord once his sister is in a convent.
- Meg is an old woman who lives up in the woods. She is kind and good at healing, but seems involved in some kind of witchcraft, claiming she can see the future in a pool of water.
- Dame Alice is the wife of the Lord of Suffolk and it is principally she who persuades her husband to take Stephen on, partly in memory of the service his father had offered his Lord.

== Plot summary ==
Stephen, whose father was bodyguard to his Lord of Suffolk, is under taken into the Lord's household when his stepfather remarries and his sister enters a convent. Stephen is keen to learn and to enter the University at Oxford under the patronage of his Lordship's chaplain, but he becomes embroiled in some mild political intrigue when he believes he has let a copy of an indiscreet letter fall into the hands of his Lordship's enemies.

== Themes ==
As with most of Cynthia Harnett's books, there is edification galore in this 15th-century story. The thinnest of plots is merely a line on which to hang a wealth of historical detail about the politics and the day-to-day circumstances of the years around 1440. The author's clear purpose, stated several times in the book, is that people — and in particular Stephen — learn to sift Good from Evil. And she uses the device of possibly witchcraft, dealing with the devil, to force her characters to consider such things. Although sensible points of view are held by those people in the story to whom we look for wisdom, it is the tiniest bit unclear at the end what we are supposed to believe about Meg, the old woman in the woods who seems to see the future in a pool of water.
