= John Phelip =

English knight (died 1415)

Sir John Phelip (died 2 October 1415) was an English knight who served as knight of the shire (MP) for Worcestershire.

== Life ==
Phelip was the son of William Phelip and Juliana Erpingham, and the younger brother of William Phelip, 6th Baron Bardolf.

Phelip's uncle Sir Thomas Erpingham had been into exile with Henry Bolingbroke, and played a leading role in Bolingbroke's overthrow of King Richard II to take the throne as King Henry IV in 1399. Through Erpingham's favour with the king, John Phelip entered the household of his heir, the future Henry V, becoming his close friend.

Phelip became a justice of the peace in Worcestershire in 1410. In 1411, he served as a captain in the army commanded by the Earl of Arundel, sent to France by Henry to support the Burgundians in the Armagnac–Burgundian Civil War.

When Henry V succeeded to the throne in 1413, Phelip was knighted before the coronation, was elected MP for Worcestershire in Henry's first parliament, and was awarded extensive property grants. In December 1414, he was a member of Henry's embassy to France that treated for peace but insisted on the restitution of Henry's right to the French crown, a position which resulted in the resumption of the Hundred Years' War. Phelip raised a force of 30 men-at-arms and 90 archers before returning to France, and fought at the Siege of Harfleur, but succumbed to dysentery and died on 2 October 1415.

He is buried at St Mary and All Saints' Church, Kidderminster, alongside his second wife Matilda Harcourt.

== Family ==
Phelip was married 3 times:

- Firstly, to a woman of the Botetourt family;
- Secondly to Matilda (Maud) Harcourt, widow of Walter Cokesey;
- Thirdly, to Alice Chaucer, daughter of Thomas Chaucer and granddaughter of the poet Geoffrey Chaucer. Chaucer was an 11-year-old child at the time of this wedding; Phelip died within a year of it. By her second and third marriages, she became Countess of Salisbury and Duchess of Suffolk.
