= Six Dukes Went a-Fishing =

Traditional song

"Six Dukes Went a-Fishing" (Roud 78) is a traditional English folk ballad.

== Synopsis ==
Six dukes go to the coast on a fishing trip but find the body of another duke, that of Grantham, washed up on the shore. They take him away, embalm his remains with sweet-smelling ointments and bury him. His wife mourns him.

== Commentary ==
A 1690 broadside is among the first documented accounts of this ballad. It seems likely that the song depicts a real set of events. The best candidate for the body is that of William de la Pole, the first Duke of Suffolk, who was murdered in 1450 by his enemies and thrown into the sea off Dover. Suffolk's untimely death is dramatised in Shakespeare's Henry VI, Part 2.

The song published in The Penguin Book of English Folk Songs is the version composer Percy Grainger collected in 1906 and made a setting of it for unaccompanied choir.

== Lyrics ==
Six Dukes Went a-Fishing
As collected by Percy Grainger, from George Gouldthorpe of Brigg, Lincolnshire (1906)

Six dukes went a-fishing,
Down by yon sea-side,
One of them spied a dead body,
Lain by the waterside.

The one said to the other,
These words I heard them say,
"It's the royal Duke of Grantham,
That the tide has washed away."

They took him up to Portsmouth,
To a place where was known,
From there up to London,
To the place where he was born.

They took out his bowels,
And stretched out his feet,
And they balmed his body,
With roses so sweet.

Six dukes stood before him,
Twelve raised him from the ground,
Nine lords followed after him,
In their black mourning gown.

Black was their mourning,
And white were the wands,
And so yellow were the flamboys,
That they carried in their hands.

Now he lies betwixt two towers,
He now lies in cold clay,
And the Royal Queen of Grantham,
Went weeping away.

== Recordings ==
- A.L. Lloyd recorded it on the album Great British Ballads Not Included in the Child Collection (1956) and again on A Selection from the Penguin Book of English Folk Songs (1960), this latter re-issued in 2003 on England and Her Traditional Songs
- There are numerous recordings of Grainger's choral arrangement.
- Shirley and Dolly Collins recorded the ballad as Six Dukes on their album Love, Death and the Lady (1970)
