= Edmund de la Pole, 3rd Duke of Suffolk =

English nobleman (c. 1471–1513)

Edmund de la Pole
- Duke and Earl of Suffolk
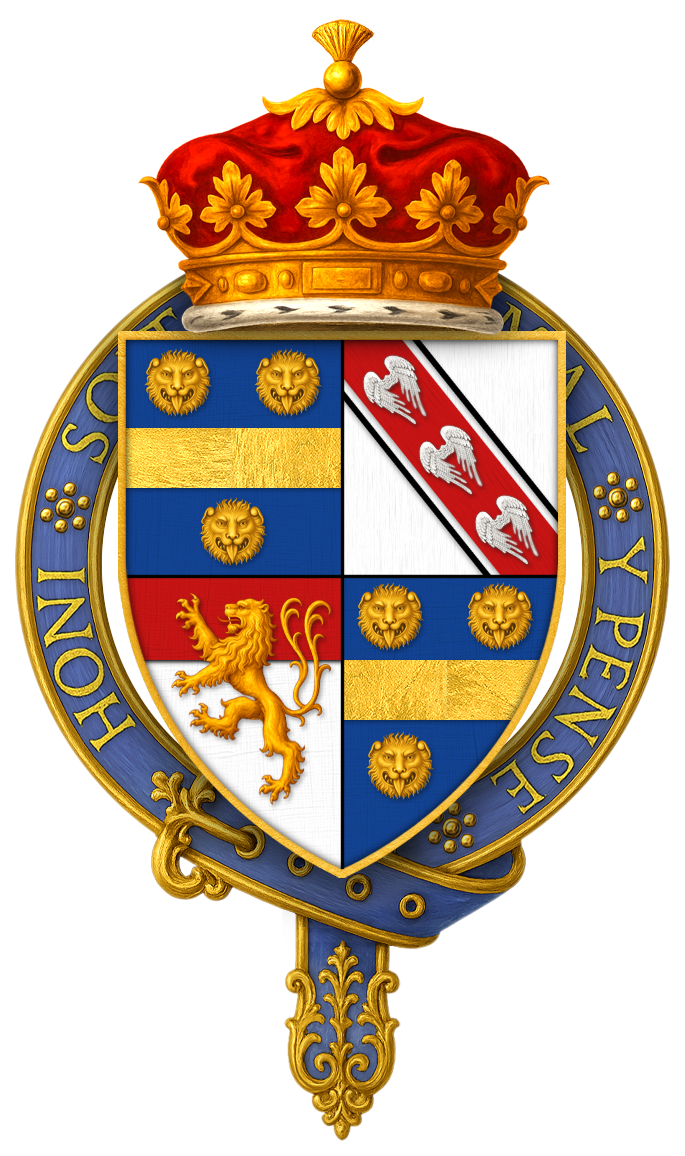
- Arms
- Born: c. 1471; England
- Died: 30 April 1513 (aged 41–42); Tower Hill, London, England
- Noble family: House of York
- Spouse: Margaret Scrope
- Issue: Elizabeth de la Pole
- Father: John de la Pole, 2nd Duke of Suffolk
- Mother: Elizabeth of York

Edmund de la Pole, 3rd Duke of Suffolk, 6th Earl of Suffolk, KG (c. 1471 – 30 April 1513), Duke of Suffolk, was an English nobleman and soldier. The son of John de la Pole, 2nd Duke of Suffolk and his wife Elizabeth of York, he was through his mother the nephew of the Yorkist kings of England Edward IV and Richard III and the cousin of Edward V and Richard of Shrewsbury, Duke of York (the Princes in the Tower) and of Henry VII's queen Elizabeth of York.

Although the male York line ended with the death of Edward Plantagenet and the Poles at first swore loyalty to the Tudor king of England, they later tried to claim the throne as the Yorkist claimants in the maternal line. Edmund was ultimately executed at the Tower of London.

== Yorkist claim ==
Edmund de la Pole was a son of John de la Pole, 2nd Duke of Suffolk, and Elizabeth of York. His mother was the second surviving daughter of Richard Plantagenet, 3rd Duke of York, and Cecily Neville. She was also a younger sister to King Edward IV and older sister to Richard III.

== Service to the Tudors ==
De la Pole's eldest brother John de la Pole, Earl of Lincoln (c. 1464 – 1487), was the designated heir of their maternal uncle Richard III, who gave him a pension and the reversion of the estates of Lady Margaret Beaufort. Meanwhile, Edmund was made a Knight of the Bath at the coronation of Richard III, and was present at the coronation of his cousin Elizabeth of York in 1487. Following the Battle of Bosworth Field, Lincoln took the oath of allegiance to Elizabeth's husband, Henry VII, instead of claiming the throne for himself. In 1487, Lincoln joined the rebellion of Lambert Simnel and was killed at the Battle of Stoke.

After the death of his older brother, Edmund became the leading Yorkist claimant to the throne, and succeeded to the title Duke of Suffolk in 1492. Edmund took part in the Siege of Boulogne in October 1492. However, he is said to have subsequently agreed with King Henry VII, by Indenture dated 26 February 1492/3, to surrender the dukedom (with, apparently, the marquessate) of Suffolk, and to be known henceforth as the Earl of Suffolk only, this being ratified by Act of Parliament in 1495. In consideration of this surrender and "of the true and diligent service done to his Highness by the said Edmund" the King granted to him, for £5,000, a portion of the lands forfeited by his elder brother John, Earl of Lincoln, in 1487.

Suffolk was one of the leaders against the Cornish rebels at Blackheath on 17 June 1497. However, in Michaelmas term 1498 he was indicted for murder in the King's Bench and, though afterwards pardoned, he fled overseas to Guisnes, July 1499, returning to England after September. He was at this time recorded as stout and bold and of courage. On 5 May 1500, he witnessed the treaty for the marriage of King Henry and Queen Elizabeth's son Prince Arthur with Catherine of Aragon at Canterbury. He then left for France, arriving there on the 13th, and attended the King at his meeting with Archduke Philip at Calais, on 9 June 1500.

== Yorkist claimant ==
In August 1501 he and his brother Richard again left England without royal leave (apparently assisted by James Tyrrell, who was subsequently executed for these actions), and joining Emperor Maximilian I in the Tyrol, he assumed his former title of Duke of Suffolk, being also known as the "White Rose" (Yorkist Pretender). For his alleged projected rebellion he was proclaimed an outlaw at Ipswich, 26 December 1502, and with his brothers William (arrested on suspicion and sent to the Tower, which he never left, early in 1502) and Richard, was attainted in Parliament January 1503/4, whereby all his honours were forfeited, backdated to 1 July 1499. Seward relates that throughout this period until Edmund's death he used a Thomas Killingworth, gentleman of East Anglia and London, as his Steward, for which Killingworth later received a Royal Pardon.

On 28 July 1502 Maximilian signed a treaty at Augsburg whereby, in return for £10,000, he undertook not to help the English rebels. Nevertheless, Suffolk was allowed to remain at Aix, 1502–04, though on leaving he had to leave his brother Richard as hostage for his debts. Upon leaving Aix about April 1504 in an attempt to join the Duke of Saxony in Friesland, he was imprisoned by the Duke of Guelders at Hattem and subsequently by Archduke Philip of Burgundy, at Namur into 1506.

== Imprisonment and execution ==
While sailing to Spain to secure his wife Joanna's inheritance of the Crown of Castile, Philip I of Castile was blown off course to England, and reluctantly and unexpectedly became a guest of Henry VII. Needing to continue his journey, Philip was persuaded by Henry to hand over the Earl of Suffolk in the treaty Malus Intercursus. Henry committed the Earl to the Tower on his arrival in London, late in March 1505/6.

On the accession of Henry VII and Elizabeth's son Henry VIII, Edmund being still in the Tower, was (with his two brothers) excepted from the new king's general pardon of 30 April 1509. After being a prisoner in the Tower for 7 years, he was (since his brother Richard had joined the service of France, with whom England was then at war), without any further proceedings, beheaded on Tower Hill aged about 42.

Montaigne, in his Essays, said that Henry VII, in his will, instructed his son to put Suffolk to death immediately after his own death, and the author criticized the father for requiring that his son do what he himself would not.

== Marriage and heirs ==
Edmund married, before 10 October 1496, Margaret, daughter of Sir Richard Scrope, Knt., second son of Henry Scrope, 4th Baron Scrope of Bolton. Margaret died in 1515. They had a daughter, Elizabeth, who became a nun and died of the plague in the Convent of the Minoresses without Aldgate, London, in 1515.

Edmund's younger brother, Richard de la Pole, declared himself Earl of Suffolk and was the leading Yorkist claimant to the throne until his death at the Battle of Pavia on 24 February 1525.

== Popular culture ==
Edmund is portrayed by Nick Barber in the 2019 Starz miniseries The Spanish Princess.

== Ancestors ==
Ancestors of Edmund de la Pole, 3rd Duke of Suffolk

8. Michael de la Pole, 2nd Earl of Suffolk
4. William de la Pole, 1st Duke of Suffolk
9. Katherine de Stafford
2. John de la Pole, 2nd Duke of Suffolk
10. Thomas Chaucer
5. Alice Chaucer
11. Matilda Burghersh
1. Edmund de la Pole, 3rd Duke of Suffolk
12. Richard of Conisburgh, 3rd Earl of Cambridge
6. Richard of York, 3rd Duke of York
13. Anne de Mortimer
3. Elizabeth of York
14. Ralph de Neville, 1st Earl of Westmorland
7. Cecily Neville
15. Joan Beaufort

== Sources ==
- Chrimes, S.B. (1977). Henry VII. Yale University Press.
- Laynesmith, J.L. (2004). The Last Medieval Queens: English Queenship 1445–1503. Oxford University Press.
- Pryde, E.B.; Greenway, D.E., eds. (2003). Handbook of British Chronology. Cambridge University Press.
- Pugh, T.B. (1992). "Henry VII and the English nobility". In Bernard, G.W. (ed.). The Tudor nobility. Manchester University Press.

Peerage of England
| Preceded by John de la Pole | Duke of Suffolk; 1492–1493 | Surrendered |
| Preceded by John de la Pole | Earl of Suffolk; 1493–1504 | Forfeit |
Titles in pretence
| Preceded by Perkin Warbeck | — TITULAR — King of England; Lord of Ireland; Yorkist claimant 1501–1513; Reason for succession failure: Dynasty deposed by Tudors | Succeeded by Richard de la Pole |
