= Ewelme =

Coordinates: 51°37′16″N 1°04′16″W

- Village and civil parish
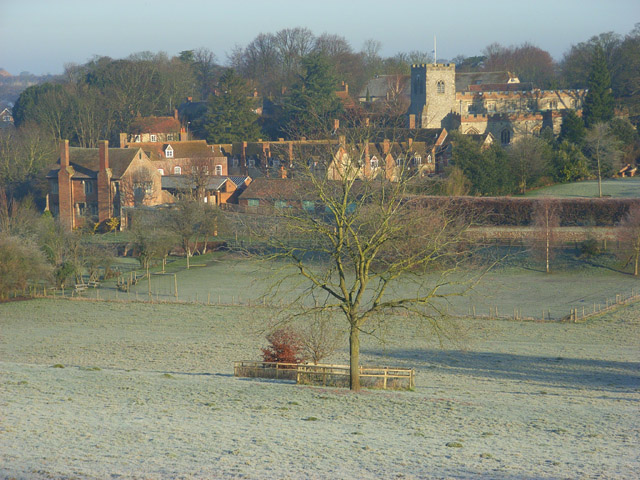
- Ewelme village seen from the south

- Location within Oxfordshire
- Area: 11.50 km^{2} (4.44 sq mi)
- Population: 1,048 (2011 Census)
  - Density: 91/km^{2} (240/sq mi)
- OS grid reference: SU6491
- District: South Oxfordshire
- Shire county: Oxfordshire
- Region: South East
- Country: England
- Sovereign state: United Kingdom
- Post town: Wallingford
- Postcode district: OX10
- Dialling code: 01491
- Police: Thames Valley
- Fire: Oxfordshire
- Ambulance: South Central
- UK Parliament: Henley and Thame
- Website: Ewelme community website

Ewelme (/ˈjuːɛlm/) is a village and civil parish in the Chiltern Hills in South Oxfordshire, 2.5 miles (4 km) northeast of the market town of Wallingford. The 2011 census recorded the parish's population as 1,048. To the east of the village is Cow Common and to the west, Benson Airfield, the northeastern corner of which is within the parish boundary. The local geology is chalk overlying Gault clay; the drift geology includes some gravel.

== Toponym ==
The toponym is derived from Ae-whylme, Old English for "waters whelming". It refers to the spring just north of the village, which forms the King's Pool that feeds the Ewelme Brook. The brook flows past Fifield Manor and then through nearby Benson before joining the River Thames. It formed the basis of Ewelme's watercress beds, which provided much local employment until well into the 20th century.

Before the inclosure of 1863, there was no clear boundary between the parishes of Ewelme, Benson and Berrick Salome where they shared large open fields. Ewelme Parish was within the Hundred of Benson in 1086, later renamed the Hundred of Ewelme.

== Almshouses and school ==
William de la Pole, 1st Duke of Suffolk, Lord Chamberlain of England, and his wife Alice established the school and cloistered almshouses from their profits from the East Anglian wool trade in 1437, and endowed them with estates in Oxfordshire, Buckinghamshire, Hampshire and Wiltshire. Alice was the daughter of Thomas Chaucer, Speaker of the House of Commons, and a granddaughter of the poet Geoffrey Chaucer. As lords of the manor, she and her father had both lived at Ewelme Palace which once stood in the village.

Ewelme School is said to be the oldest school building in the UK still in use as a local authority school. Cynthia Harnett featured the school and church prominently in her children's novel The Writing on the Hearth: the action in the book is set around the time the school was built.

The almshouses are officially called "The Two Chaplains and Thirteen Poor Men of Ewelme in the County of Oxford". There were originally thirteen almsmen; as of 2020 the charitable trust runs 23 homes for men and women, in Ewelme and in Marsh Gibbon, Buckinghamshire.

Under King James I, the original purpose of the position of Master of Ewelme Hospital was diverted in 1617 to support the Regius Professorship of Physic at the University of Oxford; this was confirmed in 1628 by the attachment of the stipend to the chair. At the same time, the Rectorship of Ewelme was made to support the same university's Regius Professor of Divinity, who then served as rector of the parish.

== Parish church ==
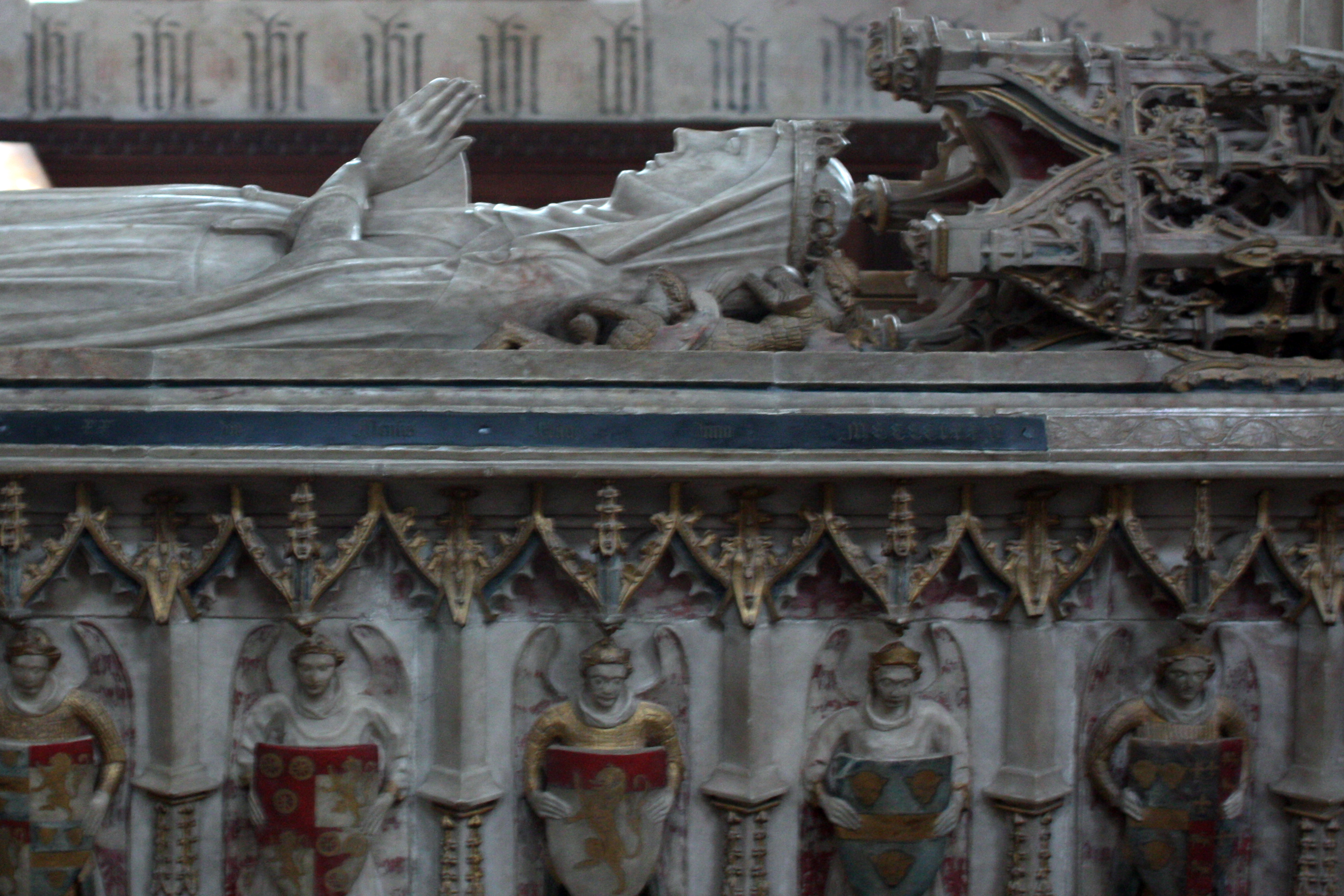
Tomb of Alice, Duchess of Suffolk.

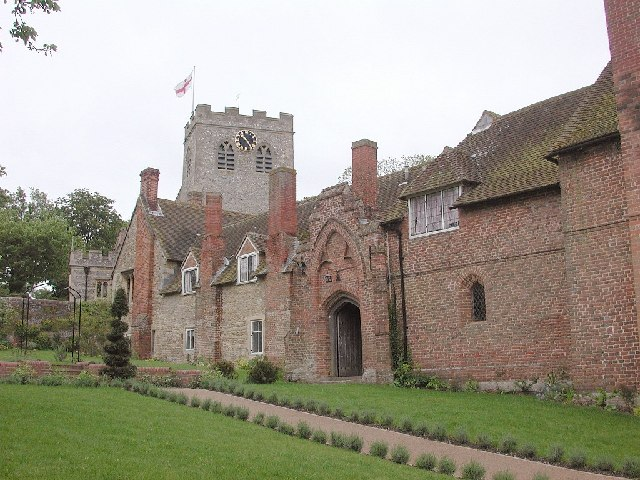
Ewelme almshouses

Thomas Chaucer, who died in 1434, his wife Matilda, and their daughter, Alice de la Pole, Duchess of Suffolk, are buried in the Church of England parish church of Saint Mary the Virgin adjoining the almshouses. The tomb chest of Thomas and that of his wife Matilda Burghersh are topped with memorial brasses showing him in plate armour and her in mantle, veil and wimple with their respective crests (his a unicorn and hers a lion) at their feet.

Alice's alabaster tomb, almost undamaged by time, consists of a canopy of panelled stone, below which is the recumbent effigy of the Duchess on top of the tomb chest which contains her remains; the space beneath the chest encloses her sculpted cadaver, which is viewed through elaborate reticulated arches. Her effigy was examined by Queen Victoria's commissioners in order to discover how a woman should wear the insignia of the Order of the Garter.

William de la Pole, 1st Duke of Suffolk was Alice's third husband; she was married first to Sir John Philip, and second to Thomas Montagu, 4th Earl of Salisbury. Her five-year-old step-great-granddaughter, Anne Beauchamp, 15th Countess of Warwick, also died at Ewelme, but was buried at Reading Abbey. Jerome K. Jerome (1859–1927), author of Three Men in a Boat, lived at Gould's Grove just southeast of Ewelme. He and his wife Ettie (died 1938) are buried in St. Mary's churchyard; their tombstone reads "For we are labourers together with God. I Corinthians III. 9". Scenes in the 2012 film Les Misérables were filmed at the parish church of Ewelme.

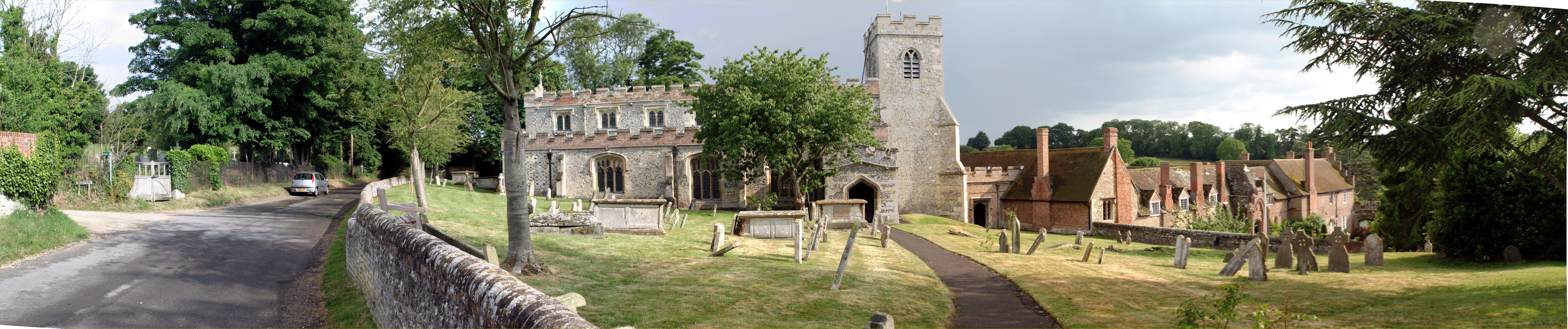
The parish church with the almshouses on the right

== Amenities ==
The village is dominated by the nearby buildings belonging to RAF Benson. Ewelme has a public house, the Shepherd's Hut, controlled by Greene King Brewery. The village shop is run by volunteers on a not-for-profit basis. Ewelme Cricket Club was founded in 1933.

Since 2006 Ewelme has hosted the annual Chiltern Chase, a charity run of two multi-terrain (cross country) courses: one of 3 miles (5 km) and the other of 6 miles (10 km). Both races start and finish on Cow Common. Normally two charities benefit equally from the proceeds of the event.

== Notable residents ==
- India Hicks, British designer, businesswoman and former model lives at "America Farm".
- Jerome K. Jerome, author, lived near Ewelme, at Gould's Grove.
- In 1954 Rowse Honey was founded by Tony Rowse

== Sources ==
- Goodall, John A.A. (2001). God's House at Ewelme. Aldershot: Ashgate Publishing. pp. not cited. ISBN 0-7546-0047-5.
- Legh, John (1999). The Story of Ewelme Watercress. The Friends of Ewelme Watercress Beds. ISBN 0-9537637-0-6.
- Mileson, Stephen; Brooks, Stuart (2014). "A Multi-Phase Anglo-Saxon Site at Ewelme". Oxoniensia. 79. Oxfordshire Architectural and Historical Society: 1–29. ISSN 0308-5562.
- Page, W.H., ed. (1907). A History of the County of Oxford. Victoria County History. Vol. 2: Ecclesiastical History, etc. Westminster: Archibald Constable & Co. p. 156.
- Prister-Crutwell, M., Ewelme – A romantic village, its past and present, its people and its history Accessed 21 December 2006
- Rowley, Trevor (1978). Villages in the Landscape. Archaeology in the Field Series. London: J.M. Dent & Sons Ltd. p. 118. ISBN 0-460-04166-5.
- Sherwood, Jennifer; Pevsner, Nikolaus (1974). The Buildings of England: Oxfordshire. Harmondsworth: Penguin Books. pp. 595–600. ISBN 0-14-071045-0.
