= John de la Pole, Earl of Lincoln =

English Yorkist nobleman (died 1487)

John de la Pole
- Earl of Lincoln
- Arms
- Born: c. 1460; England
- Died: 16 June 1487 (aged 26–27); East Stoke, Nottinghamshire, England
- Spouse: Margaret FitzAlan
- House: de la Pole
- Father: John de la Pole, 2nd Duke of Suffolk
- Mother: Elizabeth of York

John de la Pole, Earl of Lincoln (c. 1460 – 16 June 1487) was a leading figure in the Yorkist aristocracy during the Wars of the Roses.

After the death of his uncle Richard III, de la Pole was reconciled with the new Tudor regime, but two years later he organised a major Yorkist rebellion. He sought to place Lambert Simnel on the throne, claiming that Simnel was, in fact, his cousin, Edward Plantagenet, 17th Earl of Warwick. Whether or not de la Pole intended to take the throne for himself if he were successful is not known, but has been widely suspected by historians. He was defeated and killed at the Battle of Stoke Field in 1487.

== Early life ==
John de la Pole was the eldest son of John de la Pole, 2nd Duke of Suffolk and Elizabeth of York. His father was the son of Alice Chaucer, granddaughter of Geoffrey Chaucer, and Philippa (de) Roet. She was a lady-in-waiting to Edward III's queen, Philippa of Hainault, and a sister of Katherine Swynford, who later (c. 1396) became the third wife of John of Gaunt. John of Gaunt and Katherine were the ancestors of Henry VII. His mother was the sixth child and third daughter born to Richard Plantagenet, 3rd Duke of York and Cecily Neville. He was thus the nephew of the Yorkist kings Edward IV and his successor, Richard III.

John's uncle Edward IV made him Earl of Lincoln on 13 March 1467.

== Heir to the throne ==
After King Edward's death, de la Pole became a firm supporter of his uncle Richard III. He was given revenues of about 500 pounds a year and was appointed president of the Council of the North. After the death of Richard's son and heir, Edward of Middleham, he was appointed to replace him as the king's lieutenant in Ireland, though this was a nominal position as the government of Ireland was locally administered by Gerald FitzGerald, 8th Earl of Kildare.

During the last year of Richard's reign, Lincoln seems to have been designated heir to the throne, though he was never publicly proclaimed as such. Edward, Earl of Warwick, would have had a superior claim but was attainted after his father, George, Duke of Clarence, was found guilty of treason against his brother, Edward IV, in 1478. Richard made important land grants to Lincoln and, significantly, granted him the revenues of the Duchy of Cornwall, traditionally given to the heir.

== Rebellion ==
After Richard's defeat at the Battle of Bosworth Field on 22 August 1485, Lincoln was reconciled with the new king, Henry VII, but soon became impatient with the new rule. A clergyman named Symonds introduced him to his protégé, Lambert Simnel, who bore a resemblance to Edward, Earl of Warwick. Lincoln decided to promote Edward as the "true" Yorkist heir, while using Simnel to represent him, thus allowing Lincoln to become the actual leader of the Yorkists. Lincoln travelled to Burgundy to persuade his aunt Margaret, Duchess of Burgundy to finance a military expedition to take the throne from Henry. While nominally supporting Simnel, "in private, he probably saw his own accession as the ultimate goal of the enterprise." With an army of mercenaries, Lincoln sailed to Ireland, where he was supported by Gerald FitzGerald, 8th Earl of Kildare, who was keen to see a return to Yorkist rule in England. This was mainly because the Yorkist kings had allowed Irish self-government with FitzGerald as almost the "uncrowned king of Ireland". Simnel was proclaimed king in Ireland and crowned in Dublin as "Edward VI".

With his army swelled by Irish recruits led by FitzGerald's brother Thomas FitzGerald of Laccagh, Lincoln landed at Piel Island in Lancashire and proceeded to march towards York, formerly a stronghold of Richard III's supporters. However, the town refused to surrender to Lincoln. The Yorkists secured a victory over a small Lancastrian force at Bramham Moor and Lincoln managed to avoid Henry's main northern forces, which moved away when they received news that York was under attack. This may have been a diversion planned by the Yorkists. Lincoln's army was, however, repeatedly harassed by Lancastrian cavalry under Sir Edward Woodville. The Yorkists then crossed the river Trent and set up their position at the top of a hill near the village of East Stoke. Soon the vanguard of the main Lancastrian army under John de Vere, 13th Earl of Oxford caught up with them. In the subsequent Battle of Stoke Field on 16 June 1487, the Yorkist army was conclusively defeated. Lincoln himself was killed in the battle along with most of the other Yorkist leaders. In November 1487, he was posthumously attainted.

His death did not end the de la Pole claim to the throne. His younger brother Edmund de la Pole, 3rd Duke of Suffolk, became the leading Yorkist claimant to the throne until his execution by orders of Henry VIII in 1513. Their younger brother Richard de la Pole continued their claim until his own death at the Battle of Pavia (24 February 1525) while a fourth brother, William, was held prisoner in the Tower of London for 37 years, dying in 1539.

== Marriage and issue ==
Lincoln married, perhaps by the late 1470s, Margaret FitzAlan, daughter of Thomas FitzAlan, 10th Earl of Arundel, and Margaret Woodville, sister of Elizabeth Woodville. However, there were no children of the marriage; though some sources claim that they had a son called Edward, this cannot be possible as Margaret was only eight years old at the time of Edward's alleged birth.

In October 1524 Margaret's father, Thomas FitzAlan, bequeathed her a 'great ring with a turquoise'. She appears not to have remarried, and the date of her death is unknown.

== In popular culture ==
Lincoln was a major character in the opening episodes of the 1972 BBC 2 drama series about the reign of Henry VII, The Shadow of the Tower. He was played by James Laurenson.
