= Alice Chaucer, Duchess of Suffolk =

15th-century English noble

Alice Chaucer LG
- Duchess of Suffolk Countess of Pembroke
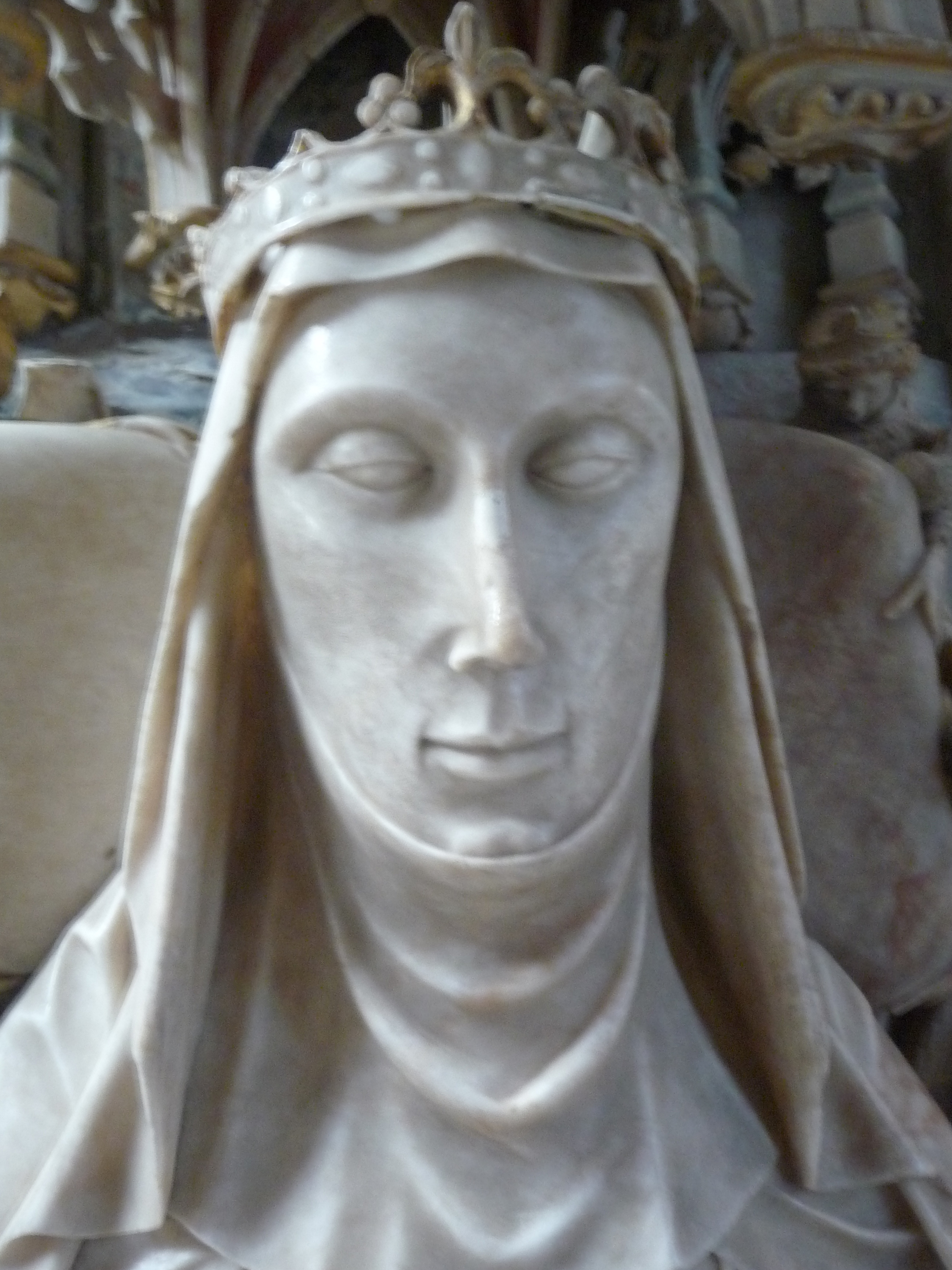
- Alice de la Pole, detail from her effigy in Ewelme Church, Oxfordshire
- Born: c. 1404
- Died: 1475
- Buried: St Mary's Church, Ewelme
- Spouses: Sir John Phelip; Thomas Montagu, 4th Earl of Salisbury; William de la Pole, 1st Duke of Suffolk
- Issue: John de la Pole, 2nd Duke of Suffolk
- Father: Thomas Chaucer
- Mother: Matilda Burghersh

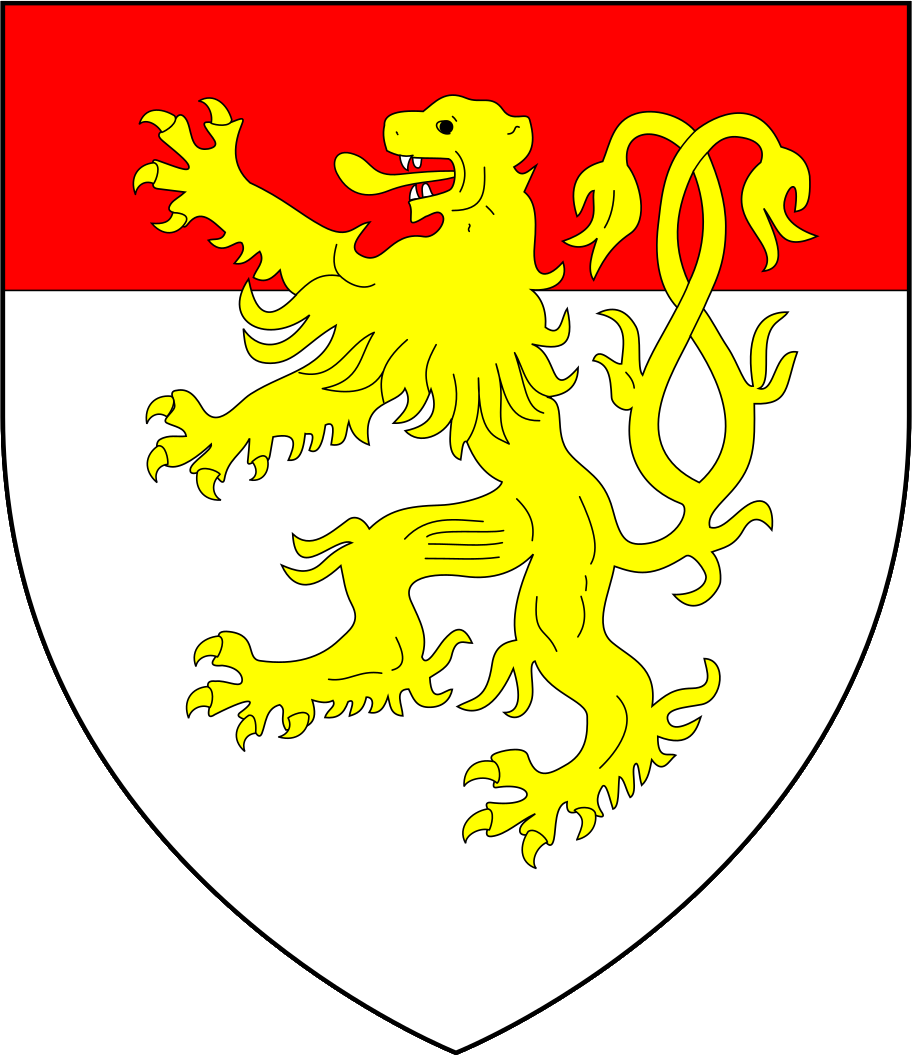
Arms of Chaucer, paternal arms of Alice de la Pole: Argent, a chief gules overall a lion rampant double queued or, as visible on her monument in Ewelme Church

Alice Chaucer, Duchess of Suffolk LG (c. 1404–1475) was an English noblewoman and patron of the arts, granddaughter of the English poet Geoffrey Chaucer. Married three times, she eventually became a Lady of the Most Noble Order of the Garter, an honour granted rarely to women and marking the friendship between herself and her third husband, William de la Pole, 1st Duke of Suffolk, with King Henry VI and his wife Margaret of Anjou.

== Origins ==
She was born as Alice Chaucer, a daughter of Thomas Chaucer by his wife, Matilda Burghersh. Her grandfather was the poet Geoffrey Chaucer, author of The Canterbury Tales.

== Marriages and children ==
She married three times:

- Firstly, when aged 11, she married Sir John Phelip (c. 1380–1415). The couple lived briefly at Donnington Castle, but Sir John died within a year. Sir John, also titled Lord Donnington, had married Maud, the widow of Walter Cookesey of Caldwall Castle, Kidderminster in the County of Worcestershire. Sir John lived at Caldwall Castle during his marriage to Maud and upon her death married Alice Chaucer. Sir John, a close personal friend of Henry V, died of dysentery after the successful 22 September 1415 capture of the fortress of Harfleur in Normandy. Sir John is buried at St Mary and All Saints' Church, Kidderminster.
- Secondly, after 1421, Alice married Thomas Montagu, 4th Earl of Salisbury (1388–1428), one of the most important English commanders during the Hundred Years' War, who died at the Siege of Orléans.
- Thirdly, in 1430, she married William de la Pole (1396–1450), whose father Michael had also died at Harfleur, along with Sir John Phelip. William was Steward of the Household to King Henry VI, and from 1447 to 1450 was the dominant force in the Council and Chief Minister to the king; as such he was particularly associated with the unpopular royal policies whose failures culminated in the anti-court protest and political violence of Cade's Revolt in 1450. He was Constable of Wallingford Castle in 1434. By William de la Pole she had a son:
  - John de la Pole (1442–1492) who married Elizabeth of York, making him the brother-in-law of two kings, Edward IV and Richard III. John became 2nd Duke of Suffolk in 1463.

== Career ==
Alice was a lady-in-waiting to Margaret of Anjou in 1445, and a patron of the arts.

== Patron of art ==
She ordered the making of a series of tapestries depicting the life of St Anne, which were displayed in the room in her house at Ewelme in Oxfordshire where she greeted visitors. She outlived her husband for a number of years and dwelled at Ewelme as the mistress of the house for a decade (during which times the tapestries were commissioned). She is a rare and important example of an autonomous woman patronising art works depicting empowered historical female characters. St Anne, mother of Virgin Mary and grandmother of Jesus, was a saint who was enjoying increasing popularity amongst female worshippers and was of particular pertinence to Alice as Anne, like Alice, also had had three marriages and was pregnant later in her life. Images of St Anne teaching the Virgin Mary to read were a popular image of Anne at this time, implying perhaps a contemporary reverence for literacy and education for women, though Alice is frequently overlooked as an historical figure of significance because of patriarchal assumptions about the subservience of women in history. Alice was a woman of intelligence and her life reveals information about the late medieval experience of women. She possessed a large library.

Alice Chaucer's library collection was extensive and varied. She owned many French texts, which are believed to be obtained when she went to France with her husband in 1444/5 for an extended time. She also owned many religious service books. Some of the French texts she owned were an original Charlemagne romance published by Caxton, known as The Four Sons of Aymon, Christine de Pizan's, Le Livre de la Cité des Dames, a translation of the De Morali Principis Institutione by Dominican friar Vincent de Beauvais, and John Lydgate's translation of Deguileville's Pèlerinage de la Vie Hamaine.

== Widowhood ==
Alice could be both ruthless and acquisitive in pursuit of the inheritance of her son, John de la Pole. In 1437, the Duke constructed the God's House at Ewelme, a reminder of their Catholic devotions. But after her husband's execution she took back many of the Norfolk manors of her friend Margaret Paston, with dubious title deeds. The Paston family grew to dislike her for this, with Margaret Paston once describing Alice as being 'subtle' in her words, demonstrating that Alice was a strong and assertive negotiator.

In 1450, William de la Pole was impeached by the House of Commons in Parliament, but Henry VI intervened to exile his favourite rather than have him tried by the House of Lords. On his way across the English Channel his vessel was intercepted by The Nicholas of the Tower whose crew subjected him to a mock trial, after which he was beheaded and his body thrown overboard. William's remains were recovered from the beach at Dover, and Alice had her husband buried at the Kingston Charterhouse, founded in 1377 by his grandfather, Michael de la Pole, 1st Earl of Suffolk. After William was killed, his properties, including Wallingford Castle and the Honour of Wallingford and St Valery, passed to Alice. She lent the Crown 3,500 marks whereupon the king spared the family from attainder of title. She survived many challenges to her position, including a state trial in 1451. Whilst she had benefited from Lancastrian connections, she switched to supporting the House of York during the Wars of the Roses. In 1455 she was custodian of the Henry Holland, 3rd Duke of Exeter at Wallingford Castle. She was officially castellan at Wallingford until at least 1471 and possibly until her death in 1475. In 1472 Alice became custodian of Margaret of Anjou, her former friend and patron. A wealthy landowner, Alice de la Pole held land in 22 counties, and was a patron of the poet John Lydgate.

== Death and burial ==
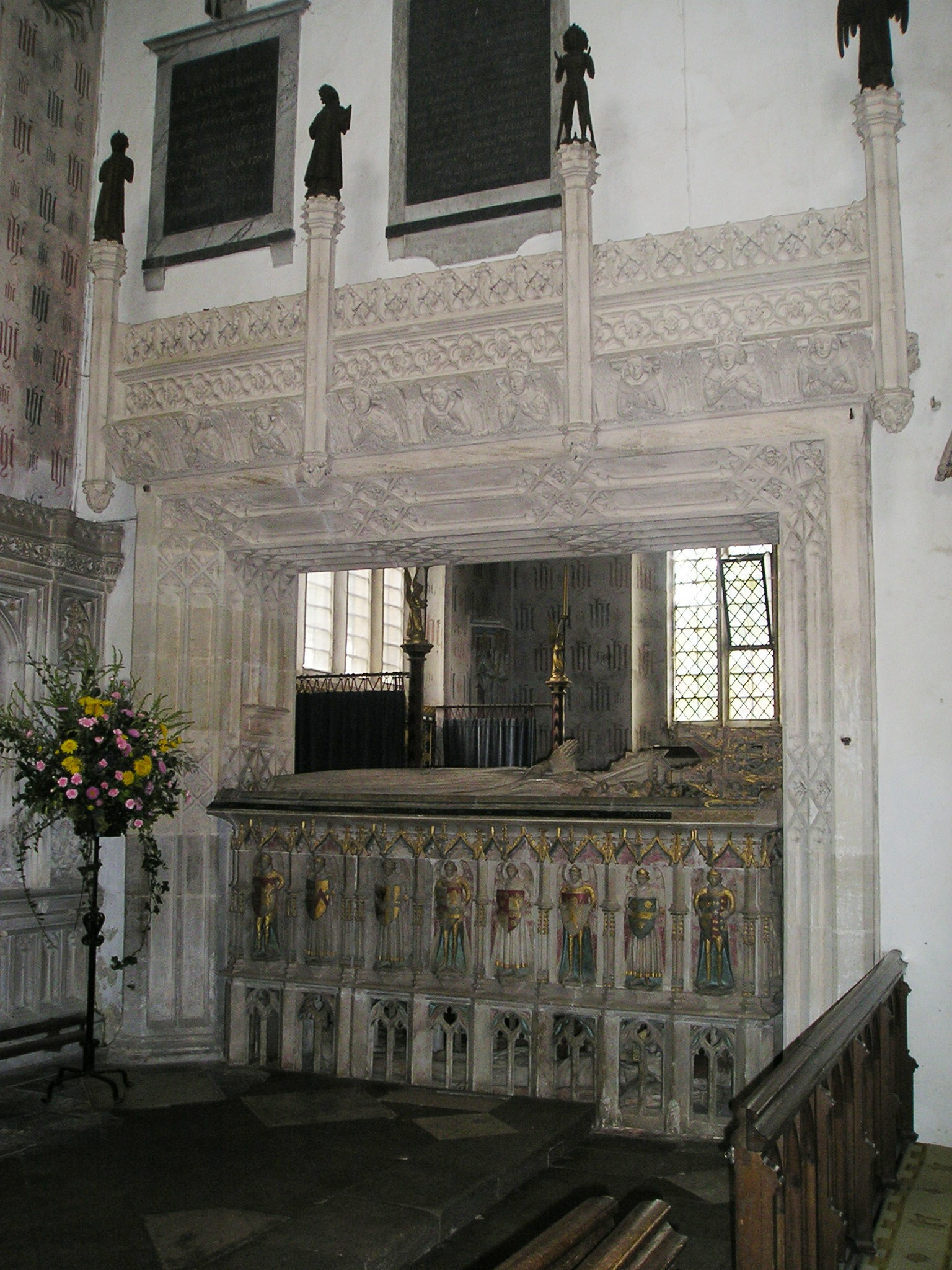
Monument (north side) to Alice Chaucer, Duchess of Suffolk, St Mary's Church, Ewelme

She died in 1475 and was buried in St Mary's Church, Ewelme. Shortly before her death she gifted her son John and Elizabeth his wife all her gold and silver plate and beds of cloth of gold, keeping only her older possessions which 'daily serve me'.

Her alabaster cadaver tomb monument survives today, almost undamaged by time. It consists of a chest tomb on top of which is the recumbent effigy of the Duchess, with a canopy of panelled stone above. The space beneath the effigy encloses her sculpted cadaver, which is visible through elaborate reticulated arches.

Her effigy was examined by Queen Victoria's commissioners to discover how a lady should wear the Order of the Garter, which she wears on her left wrist. The Latin inscription on the monument is: Orate pro Anima Serenissimae Principissae Aliciae Ducissae Suffolciae Huius Ecclesiae Patronae, et Primae Fundatricis Huius Eleemosynariae Quae obit XX Die Mensis Maii Anno 1475 ("Pray ye all for the soul of the Most Serene Princess Alice, Duchess of Suffolk, patron of this church, and first founder of this charity, who died on the 20th day of the month of May in the year 1475"). The title of "Most Serene Princess" she probably acquired by her son's royal marriage.

On the monument are sixteen heraldic shields, displaying the arms of Chaucer, the Royal Arms of England, de la Pole, Montagu quartering Monthermer, and Roet.

== Children and Yorkist claim to the throne ==
=== Son ===
Alice's son, John de la Pole, 2nd Duke of Suffolk, married Elizabeth of York, the second surviving daughter of Richard of York, 3rd Duke of York and Cecily Neville. Elizabeth's brothers included the Yorkist kings Edward IV and Richard III and her other siblings included George, Duke of Clarence and Margaret of York (later Duchess of Burgundy).

=== Grandsons ===
Three of John de la Pole's four sons by Elizabeth of York - Alice's grandsons - pursued the unsuccessful Yorkist claim to the throne against Henry VII.

1. John de la Pole, 1st Earl of Lincoln, was designated heir to his uncle Richard III and pursued the Yorkist claim to the throne under Henry VII. Along with his aunt Margaret, Duchess of Burgundy he supported the pretender Lambert Simnel, but was killed at the Battle of Stoke (1487).
2. Lincoln's younger brother, Edmund de la Pole, 3rd Duke of Suffolk, became the leading Yorkist claimant to Henry VII's throne and was executed in 1513.
3. Richard de la Pole, their youngest brother, continued the Yorkist claim until he was slain at the Battle of Pavia, 1525.

== In popular culture ==
Alice Chaucer is a main character in several of Margaret Frazer's Dame Frevisse historical mysteries, and is mentioned in several others. As Alyce Chaucer, she is the heroine of four historical fictions by Christina Hardyment.
