= Thomas Chaucer =

English courtier and politician (died 1434)

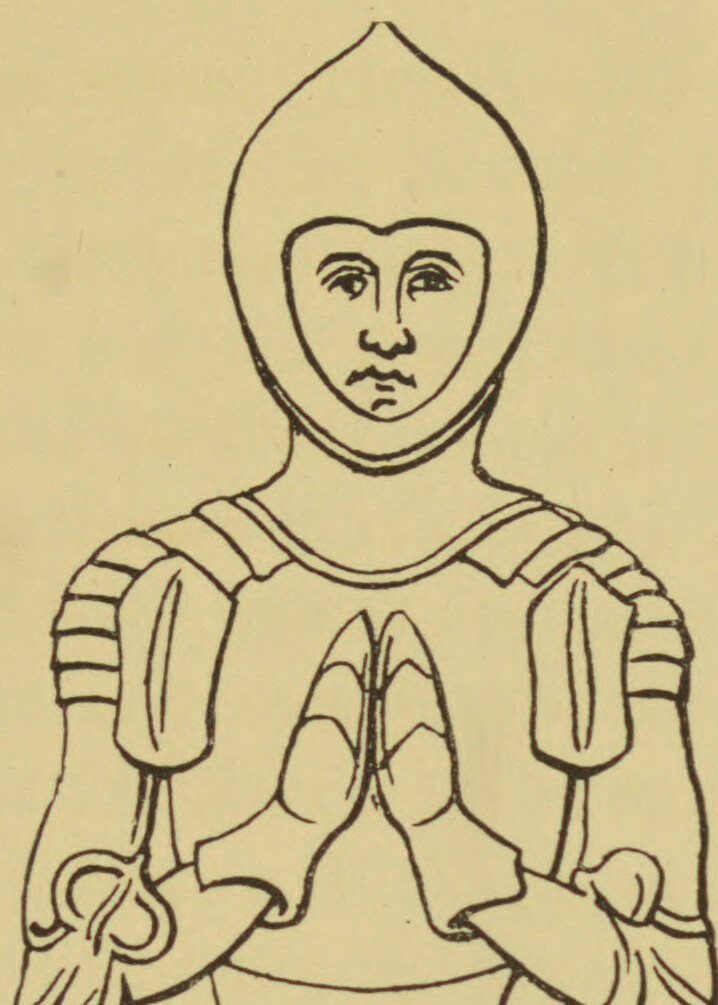
- Memorial brass of Thomas Chaucer in Ewelme Church, Oxfordshire

Speaker of the House of Commons
- In office 25 August 1407 – 19 December 1411
- Monarch: Henry IV of England
- Preceded by: Sir John Tiptoft
- Succeeded by: Unknown, next known is William Stourton
- In office 19 November 1414 – 1415
- Monarch: Henry V of England
- Preceded by: Sir Walter Hungerford
- Succeeded by: Sir Richard Redman
- In office 1421–1421
- Monarch: Henry V of England
- Preceded by: Roger Hunt
- Succeeded by: Richard Baynard

Member of Parliament for Oxfordshire
- In office 1401–1402
- Preceded by: Thomas Barantyn
- Succeeded by: Sir Peter Bessels
- In office 1406 – May 1413
- Preceded by: Sir William Lisle
- Succeeded by: Sir William Lisle
- In office Nov 1414 – Mar 1416
- Preceded by: Sir John Brayton
- Succeeded by: Thomas Stonor
- In office 1421–1421
- Preceded by: John Danvers
- Succeeded by: John Danvers

Chief Butler of England
- In office 1404–1434
- Preceded by: Unknown, last known is John Payn
- Succeeded by: Sir John Tiptoft

Personal details
- Born: c. 1367 Oxfordshire, England
- Died: 18 November 1434 Ewelme, Oxfordshire, England
- Party: None
- Spouse: Matilda Chaucer (née Burghersh)
- Children: Alice de la Pole, Duchess of Suffolk
- Parent(s): Geoffrey Chaucer; Philippa Roet

Thomas Chaucer (c. 1367 – 18 November 1434) was an English courtier and politician. The son of the poet Geoffrey Chaucer and his wife Philippa Roet, Thomas was linked socially and by family to senior members of the English nobility, though he was himself a commoner. Elected fifteen times to the Parliament of England, he was Speaker of the House of Commons for five parliaments in the early 15th century.

== Parental connections ==
Thomas Chaucer was a relative by marriage of John of Gaunt, 1st Duke of Lancaster, through his aunt Katherine Swynford. Katherine (born Roet) was the sister of his mother, Philippa Roet. Swynford was first Gaunt's mistress, and then his third wife. Their four children, John Beaufort, Henry Beaufort, Thomas Beaufort and Joan Beaufort, were first cousins to Thomas Chaucer, and all prospered: John's family became Earls and subsequently Dukes of Somerset, Henry a Cardinal, Thomas became Duke of Exeter, Joan became Countess of Westmorland and was grandmother of Kings Edward IV and Richard III.

King Henry IV, the son of John of Gaunt by his first marriage to Blanche of Lancaster, was half-brother to Thomas Chaucer's Beaufort first cousins. Thomas was able to buy Donnington Castle in Berkshire for his only daughter Alice de la Pole.

== Marriage ==
Early in life, Thomas Chaucer married Matilda (or Maud) Burghersh, second daughter and coheiress of Sir John Burghersh, nephew of Henry Burghersh (1292–1340), Bishop of Lincoln (1320–1340) and Lord Chancellor of England (1328–1330), younger son of Robert de Burghersh, 1st Baron Burghersh (died 1305), and a nephew of Bartholomew de Badlesmere, 1st Baron Badlesmere. The marriage brought him large estates, including the manor of Ewelme, Oxfordshire.

== Career ==
He was Chief Butler of England for almost thirty years, first appointed by Richard II, and on 20 March 1399 received a pension of twenty marks a year in exchange for offices granted him by the Duke, paying at the same time five marks for the confirmation of two annuities of charges on the Duchy of Lancaster and also granted by the Duke.

These annuities were confirmed to him by Henry IV, who appointed him constable of Wallingford Castle, and steward of the honours of Wallingford and St. Valery and of the Chiltern Hundreds. About the same time he succeeded his father Geoffrey Chaucer as forester of North Petherton Park, Somerset. On 5 November 1402, he received a grant of the chief butlership for life. On 23 February 1411 the queen gave him the manor of Woodstock and other estates during her life, and on 15 March the king assigned them to him after her death.

Chaucer served as High Sheriff of Berkshire and Oxfordshire during 1400 and 1403 and as High Sheriff of Hampshire in 1413. He attended fifteen parliaments as knight of the shire for Oxfordshire (1400–1401, 1402, 1405–1406, 1407, 1409–1410, 1411, 1413, 1414, 1421, 1422, 1425–1426, 1427, 1429, 1430–1431) and was Speaker of the House five times, a feat not surpassed until the 18th century.

Arms of Thomas Chaucer: Per pale Argent and Gules, a bend counterchanged.

He was chosen speaker in the parliament that met at Gloucester in 1407, and on 9 November reminded the king that the accounts of the expenditure of the last subsidy had not been rendered. The chancellor interrupted him, declaring that they were not ready, and that for the future the lords would not promise them.

He was chosen again in 1410 and in 1411, when, on making his 'protestation' and claiming the usual permission of free speech, he was answered by the king that he might speak as other speakers had done, but that no novelties would be allowed. He asked for a day's grace, and then made an apology. He was again chosen in 1414.

In 1414 he also received a commission, in which he is called domicellus, to treat about the marriage of Henry V, and to take the homage of the Duke of Burgundy. A year later he served with the king in France, bringing into the field 12 men-at-arms and 37 archers. He was not present at the Battle of Agincourt, being sent back to England ill after the siege of Harfleur; his retinue did march on to Agincourt. It is unknown if he was really sick, or used it as an excuse to return to England. In 1417, he was employed to treat for peace with France.

On the accession of Henry VI he appears to have been superseded in the chief butlership, and to have regained it shortly afterwards. In January 1424, he was appointed a member of the council, and the next year was one of the commissioners to decide a dispute between the Earl Marshal and the Earl of Warwick about precedence. In 1430–1431, he was appointed one of the executors of the will of the Duchess of York, and was by then very wealthy.

Thomas Chaucer died at Ewelme Palace in the village of Ewelme, Oxfordshire on 18 November 1434 and is buried in St Mary's church in the village.

== Family ==
Thomas' only daughter Alice married William de la Pole, 1st Duke of Suffolk and her grandson John de la Pole, Earl of Lincoln was the designated heir of Richard III. John was killed in battle and several of his brothers were later executed after Richard lost power. They left descendants however, including the Earls of Rutland and Portmore, William Parker, 4th Baron Monteagle, who foiled the Gunpowder Plot and Sir Francis Sacheverel Darwin (through his mother, Elizabeth Collier, natural daughter of the Earl of Portmore).

Parliament of England
Preceded by John Wilcotes; Thomas Barantyn	Member of Parliament for Oxfordshire; 1401–1402; With: John Wilcotes 1401; Thomas Wykeham 1402	Succeeded by Sir Peter Bessels; William Mackney
Preceded by Sir John Drayton; John Wilcotes	Member of Parliament for Oxfordshire; 1406–1411; With: John Wilcotes 1406–1407; William Wilcotes 1410; Unknown 1411	Unknown
Unknown	Member of Parliament for Oxfordshire; 1413; With: John Wilcotes	Succeeded by William Lisle; John Wilcotes
Preceded by William Lisle; John Wilcotes	Member of Parliament for Oxfordshire; 1414; With: John Wilcotes	Unknown
Preceded by John Danvers; Richard Greville	Member of Parliament for Oxfordshire; 1421; With: John Wilcotes	Succeeded by John Danvers; Peter Fettiplace
Preceded by John Danvers; Peter Fettiplace	Member of Parliament for Oxfordshire; 1422; With: Sir Thomas Wykeham	Succeeded by John Danvers; Peter Fettiplace
Preceded by John Danvers; Thomas Stonor	Member of Parliament for Oxfordshire; 1426–1431; With: Thomas Stonor 1425, 1427–1431; Unknown 1426	Succeeded by Richard Quatremain; Unknown
Political offices
Preceded by William Wilcotes	High Sheriff of Berkshire and Oxfordshire; 1400–1401	Succeeded by John Wilcotes
Preceded by Robert James	High Sheriff of Berkshire and Oxfordshire; 1403–1404	Succeeded by John Golafre
Preceded by Sir John Tiptoft	Speaker of the House of Commons; 1407–1411	Succeeded by unknown, later William Stourton
Preceded by Sir Walter Hungerford	Speaker of the House of Commons; 1414–1415	Succeeded by Richard Redman
Preceded by Roger Hunt	Speaker of the House of Commons; 1421	Succeeded by Richard Baynard
