= Stanley family =

English noble family

Stanley
- Country: United Kingdom
- Titles: • Baron Stanley • Stanley baronets

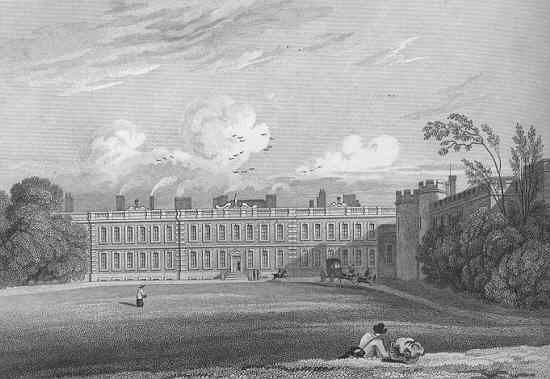
Knowsley Hall, the west front view in 1829

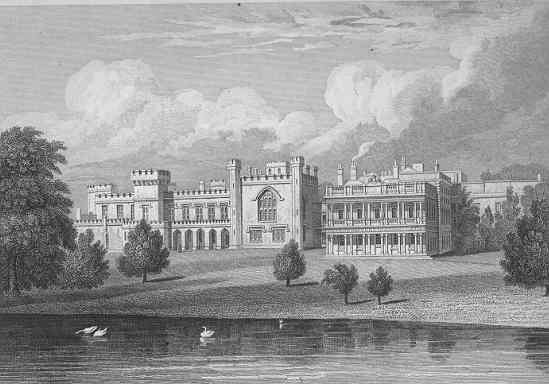
Knowsley Hall, seat of the Earls of Derby, Stanley family, 1829

The Stanley family (or Audley-Stanley family) is an English family with many notable members, including the Earls of Derby and the Barons Audley who descended from the early holders of Audley and Stanley, Staffordshire. The two branches of the Audley family were made Barons Audley but both ended in the male line in the 14th century, after which their considerable estates were passed to a number of female heiresses, while the Stanleys would be elevated in the 15th century first to Barons Stanley and then Earls of Derby, a title they continue to hold.

The use of "Stanley" as a first name began with political followers of the family.

== Origins ==
The earliest documented members of the related Audley and Stanley families are two apparent brothers, Ligulf de Aldelegha and Adam de Standlega, who during the reigns of kings Stephen and Henry II appear to have divided the Audley, Staffordshire, lands that at the time of the 1086 Domesday survey had been the holdings of a man named Gamel, though no familial relationship with their predecessor is known.

The parentage of Ligulf and Adam is unknown, though the English name of the former suggests they had Anglo-Saxon roots. Later descendants, during a period when it came to be socially prestigious, would fabricate a Norman origin for their family, pushing Ligulf and Adam back in time and presenting them as sons of a fictitious Adam, follower of William the Conqueror and lord of an equally fictitious 'Aldithley in Normandy', despite Ligulf's non-Norman name and the English etymology of 'Aldithley'.

Later, as pre-Norman ancestry came into vogue, the Stanleys would invent a maternal descent from a fantastical Anglo-Saxon living a half-century before the conquest, yet improbably bearing the Norman name of 'William' de Stanley. It is uncertain how Stanley, Staffordshire, about 9 miles from Audley and not part of Gamel's Domesday holdings, came to be in the possession of Ligulf's son Adam de Aldelegha, ancestor of the Audleys, before he granted it to his cousin William, son of Adam's uncle Adam de Standlegha, the Stanley ancestor.

== Audley ==
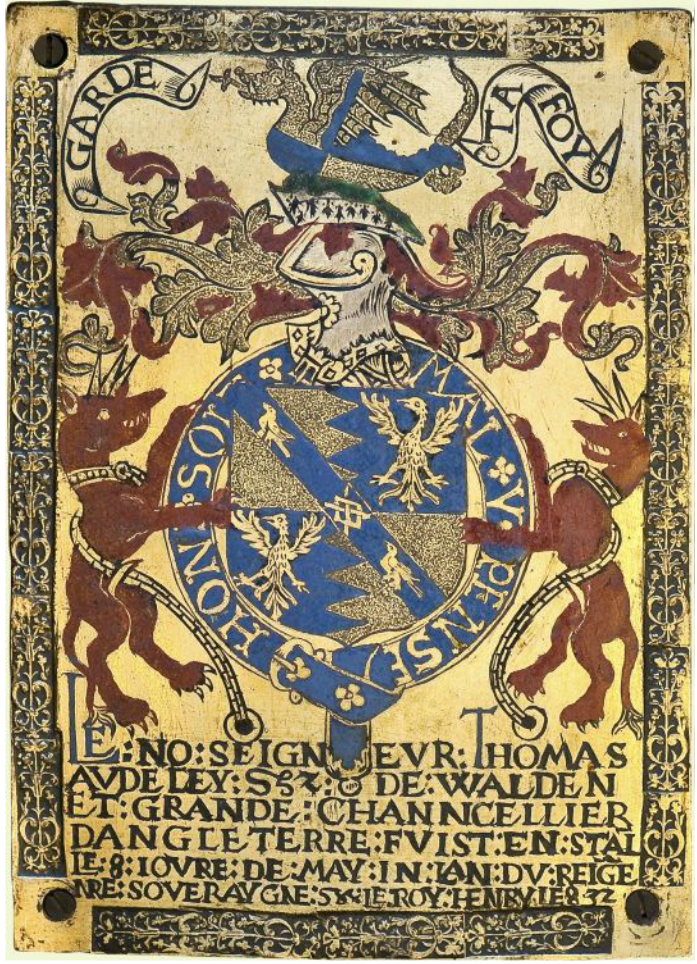
Garter stall plate of Lord Chancellor, Thomas Audley, 1st Baron Audley of Walden, at St George's Chapel, at Windsor Castle

The extended Audley family, originally of Audley Castle but who later built (or re-built) Heighley Castle, Madeley, Staffordshire in 1226, had several additional households including Red Castle at Hawkstone in Shropshire, Buglawton Manor in Congleton, Newhall Tower at Newhall, Cheshire and a home in Nantwich. In the early 12th century Adam's grandson William married Joan de Stanley heiress of Stoneleigh, Staffordshire thereby becoming William de Stanley of Stoneleigh. This branch of the Audley thus took the name Stanley and Thomas Stanley, 1st Earl of Derby was a direct descendant.

The main line of the Audley family, who had become Baron Audley in 1313, failed in 1391 when Nicholas Audley, 3rd Baron Audley died without a male heir. His sister Joanne married Sir John Tuchet (b 1327) for whose descendant John Tuchet (b 1371) the title of 4th Baron Audley was granted in 1408. He was succeeded by his son James Touchet, 5th Baron Audley. Later generations of the Tuchets became Earl of Castlehaven.

Another branch of the Audley family was created by Hugh Audley of Stratton Audley, Baron Audley from 1317, whose son became 1st Earl of Gloucester. His daughter and heir Margaret de Audley, 2nd Baroness Audley, was abducted by Ralph de Stafford, 1st Earl of Stafford, to become his second wife, which despite some scandal, the king allowed.

Thomas Audley, 1st Baron Audley of Walden KG, PC, KS (c. 1488 – 30 April 1544), son of Geoffrey Audley of Earl's Colne Essex, and presumed to have been a scion of this family, an English barrister and judge who served as Lord Chancellor of England from 1533 to 1544, and earlier Speaker of the House of Commons. He left no sons and his estates passed via his daughter Margaret Audley, Duchess of Norfolk to the Howard family.

== Stanley ==
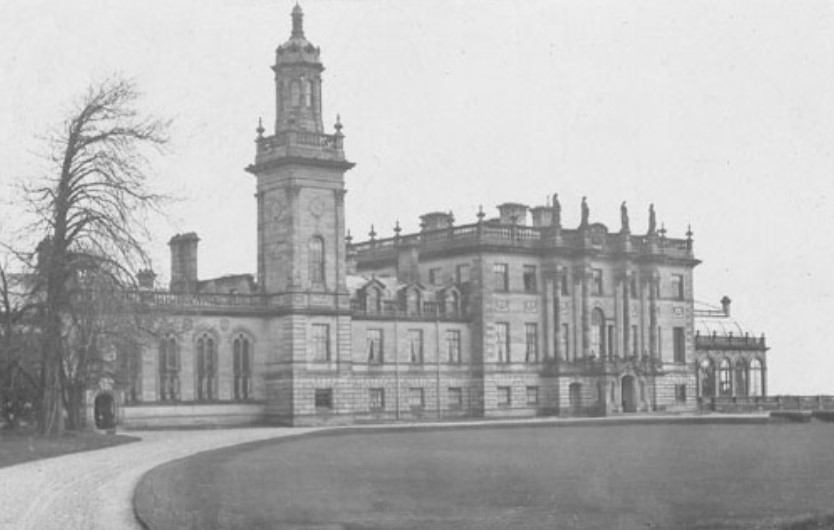
Hooton Hall, estate of the Stanley family of Flintshire, Storeton, Eastham, Burton and others

The younger branch of the family elevated their status through several beneficial marriages. In the late 13th century, William de Stanleye married one of the coheiresses of Philip de Baumvill. A century later, the family split into two branches, with the elder son William inheriting the Baumvill-derived family seat at Stourton, Cheshire and by marriage acquiring near-by Hooton, from whom derived the senior branch of the family that came to be referred to as the Stanelys of Hooton.

The younger son, Sir John Stanley, married rich heiress Isabella de Lathom, daughter of Thomas Lathom of Lathom, Lancashire. He subsequently became Lord Lieutenant of Ireland and King of Mann, a title reflecting the special status of the Isle of Man, which with its successor title Lord of Mann the family would hold with some gaps from 1405 to 1736, when it was sold back to the Crown.

Sir John's grandson, Thomas Stanley, would become Baron Stanley in 1456, while John's son became Thomas Stanley, 1st Earl of Derby in 1485. The senior branch of the Stanley Earls failed with the death of James Stanley, 10th Earl of Derby in 1735, having been predeceased by his only son, and the earldom was inherited by a remote kinsman, his patrilineal sixth-cousin Edward Stanley, 5th Baronet Stanley, whose line, descended from a younger brother of the 2nd Earl of Derby, had been made Baronets Stanley of Bickerstaffe in 1623. This line still holds the Derby earldom, with the incumbent, Edward Stanley, being the 19th Earl. The branch of the Stanleys leading to the peers would also spawn numerous junior branches.

=== Conservative Party ===
Several successive generations of the Stanley Earls, along with other members of the family, have been prominent members of the Conservative Party, and at least one historian has suggested that this family rivals the Cecils (Marquesses of Salisbury) as the single most important family in the party's history.

== Coats of arms ==
Arms of Audley: Gules, fretty or

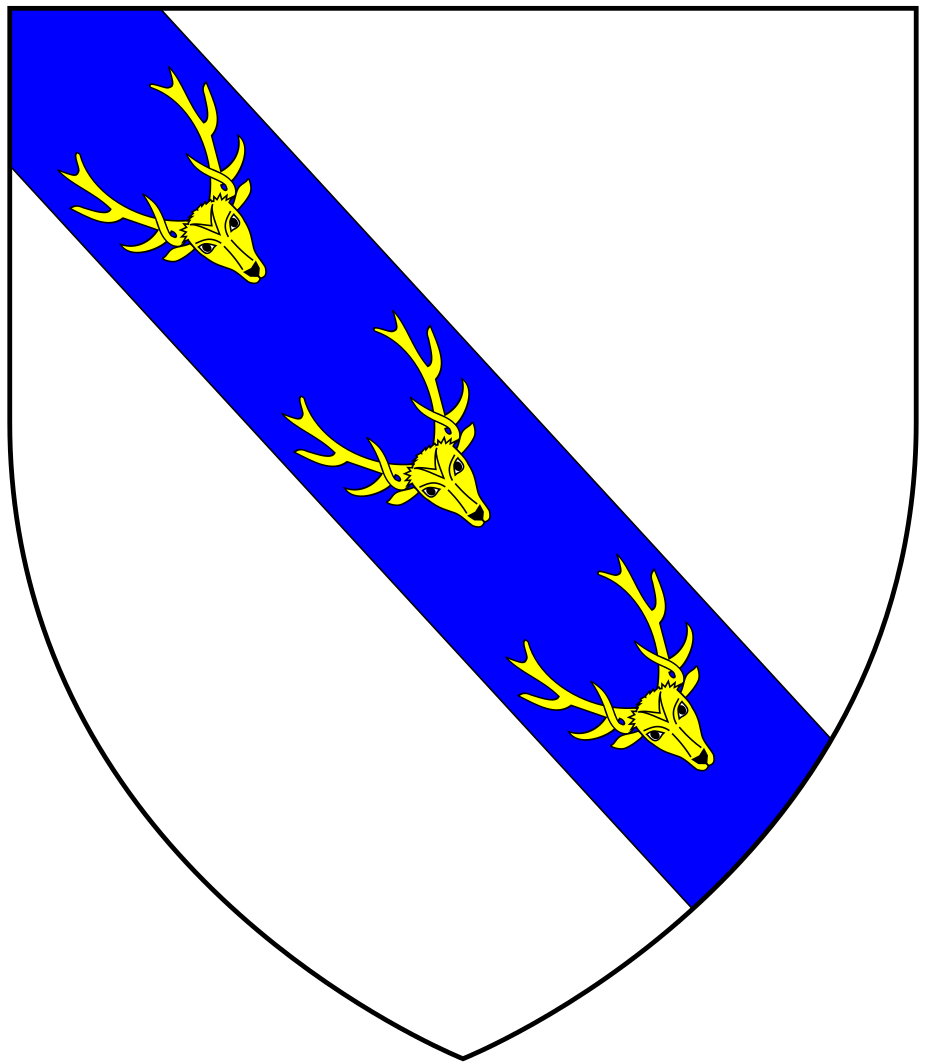
Arms of Stanley: Argent, on a bend azure three buck's heads cabossed or

Audley Family Arms:

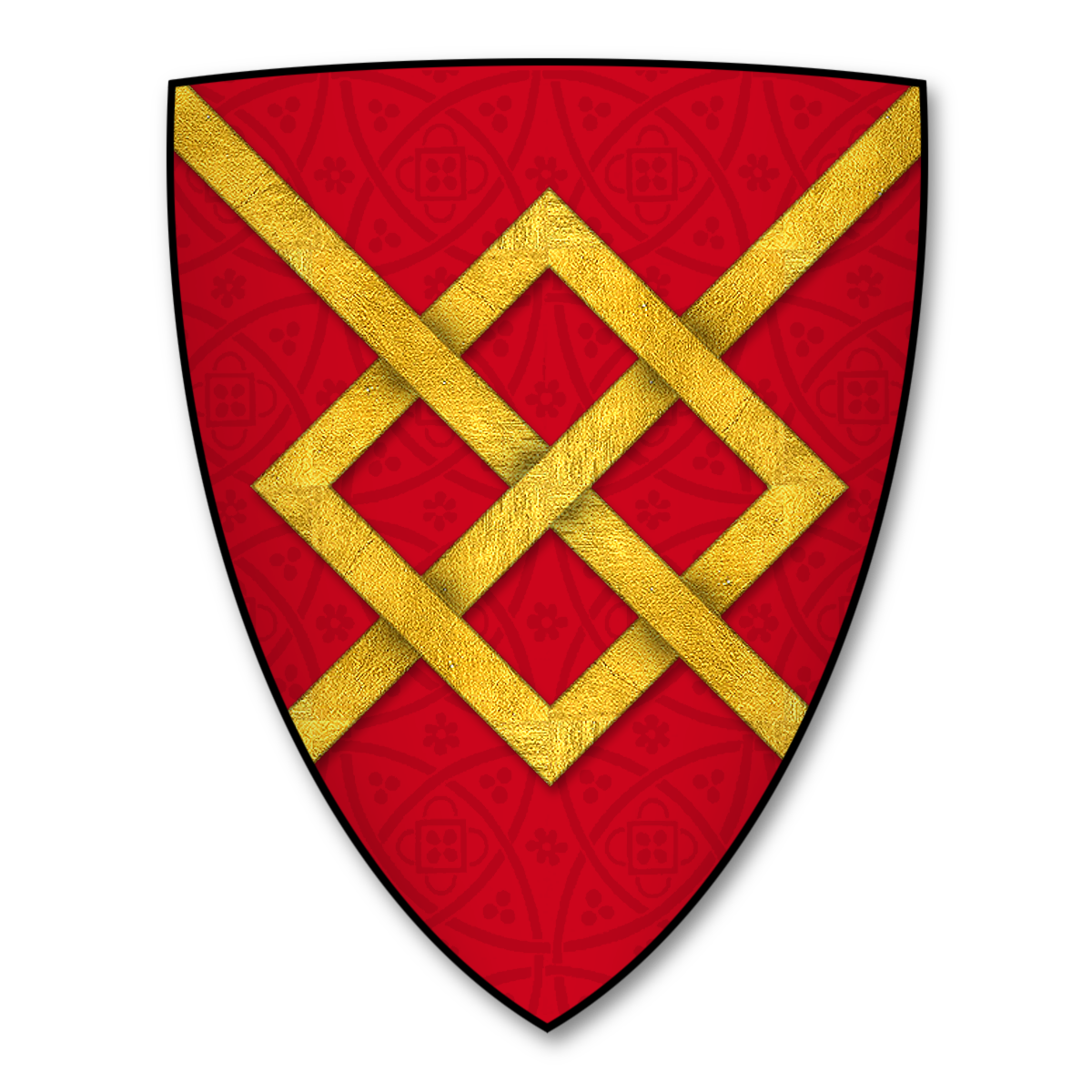
Armorial Bearings of the AUDLEY family of Much Marcle, Herefordshire

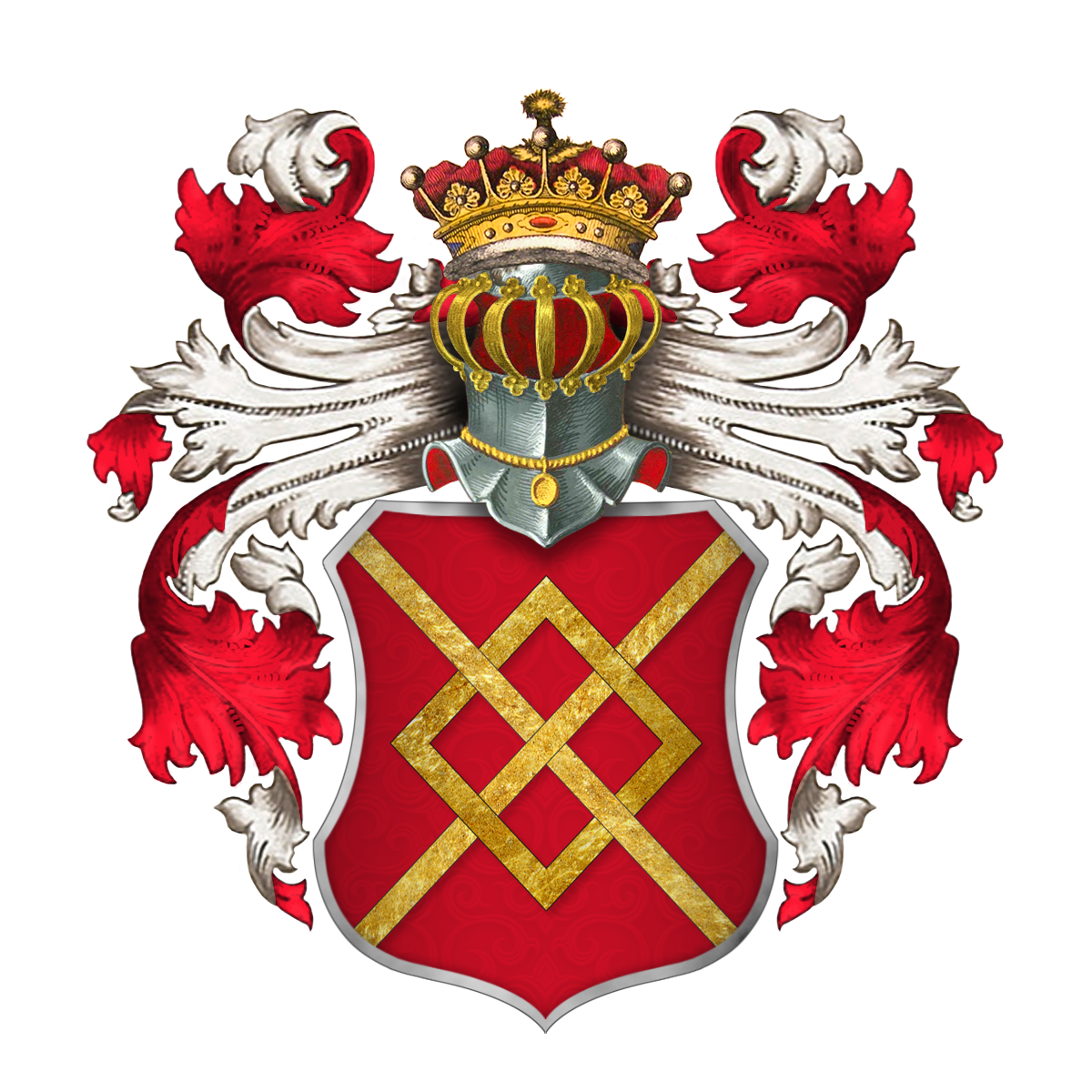
Arms of Audley, Earls of Gloucester

Arms of the Audley Family

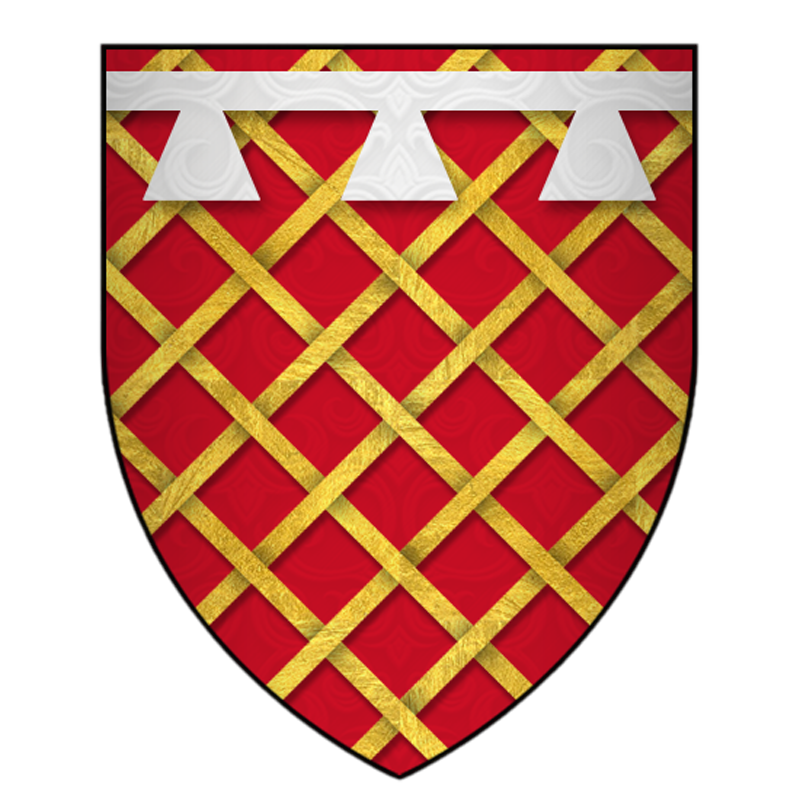
Arms of Sir James Audeley, KG

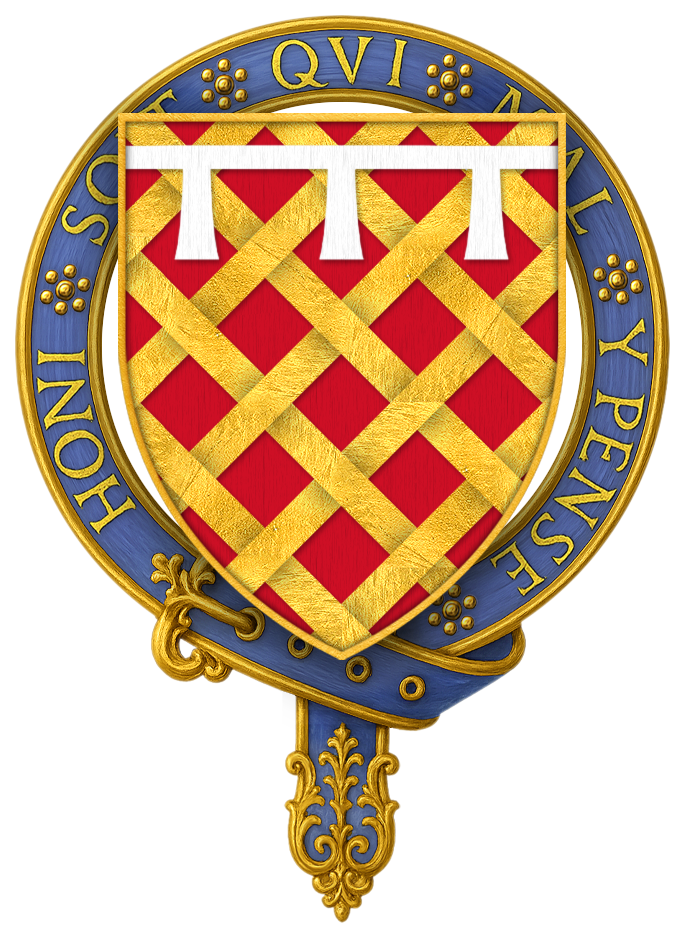
Arms of Sir James Audeley, KG

Tuchet, Barons Audley

Arms of Arms of Sir James Audeley, KG from the Armorial Gelre

Arms of the Stanley Family descended from the Audley Family:

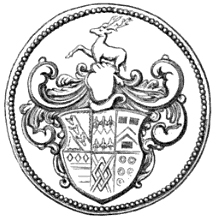
Medal of Thomas Stanley showing the Audley and Stanley arms

Arms of Stanley of Alderley

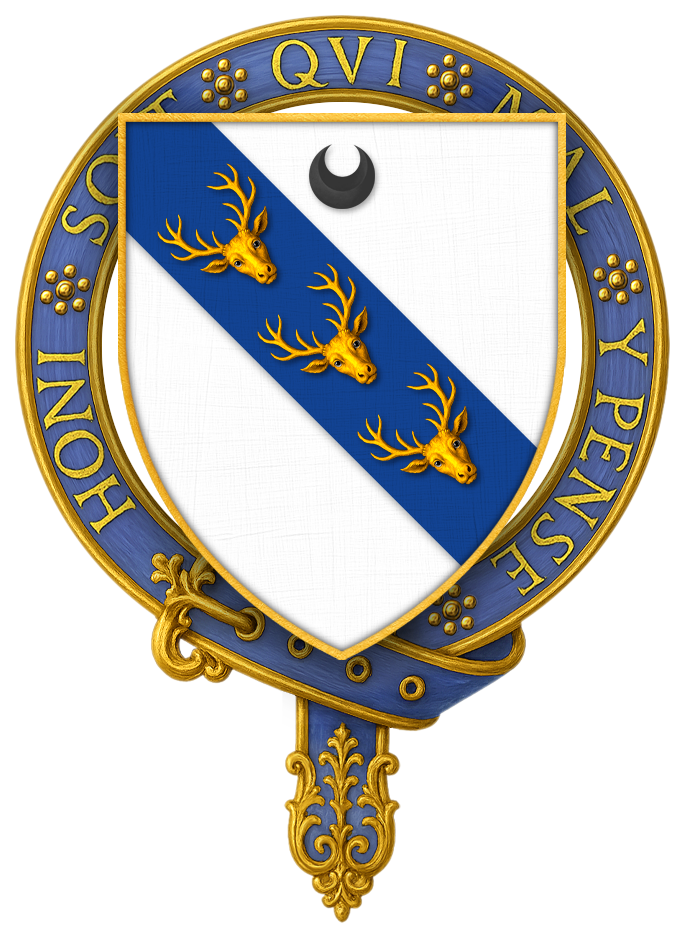
Arms of Sir William Stanley, KG

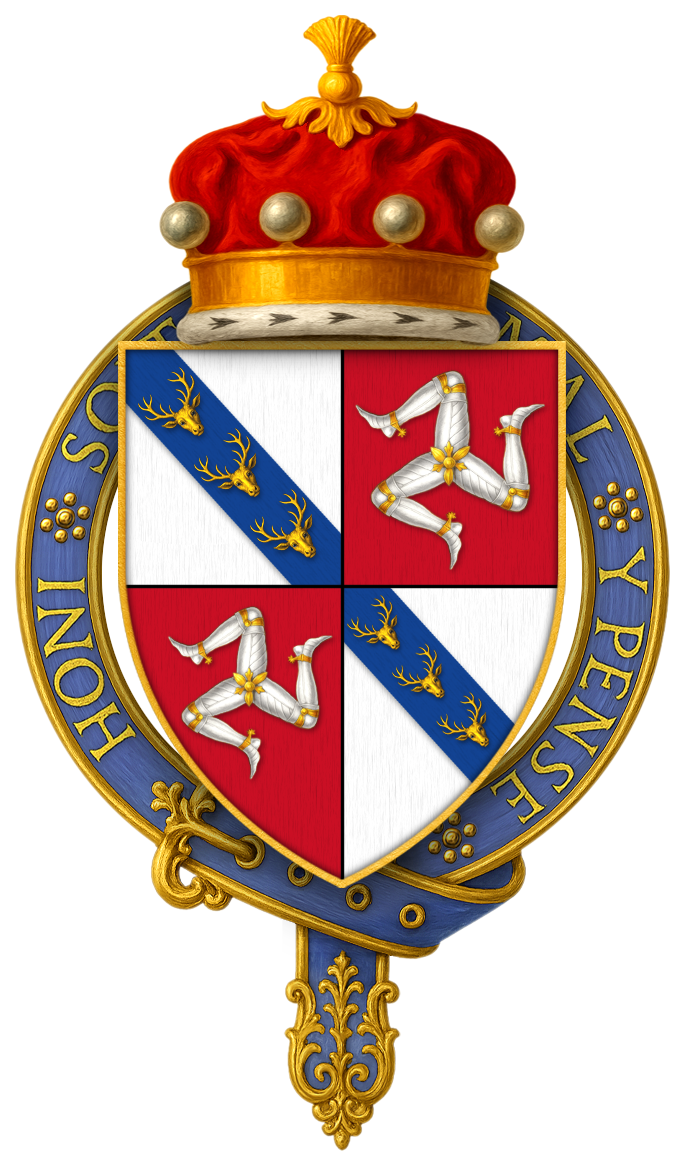
Sir John Stanley, King of Man

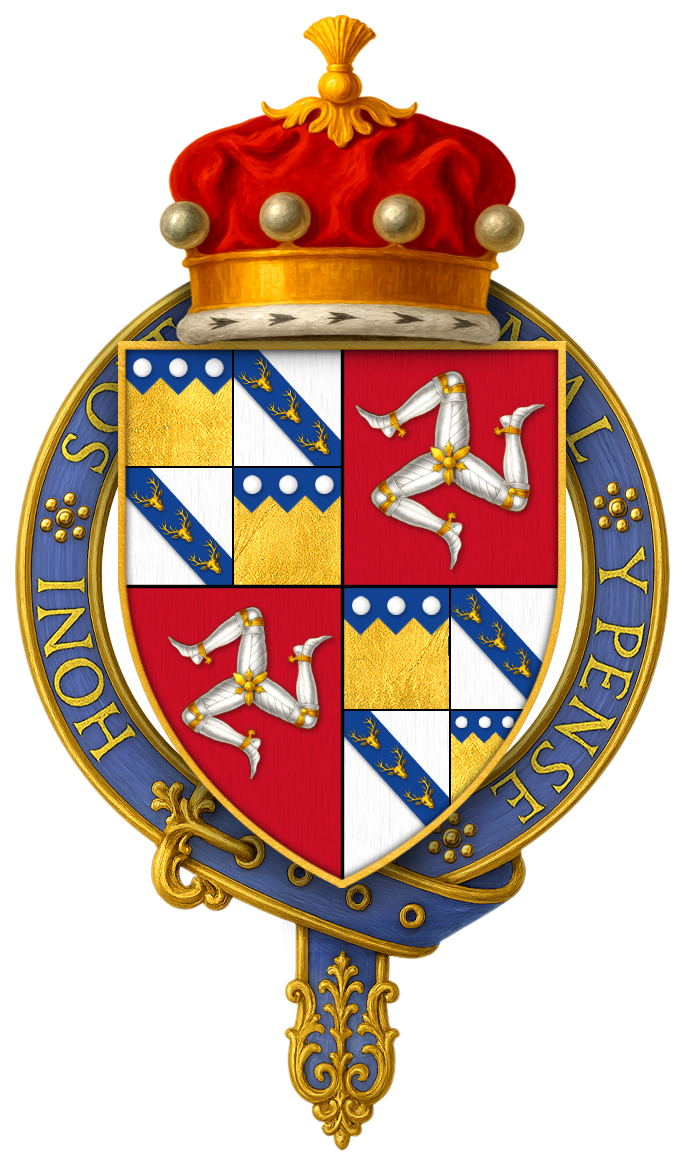
Arms of Thomas Stanley, 1st Baron Stanley

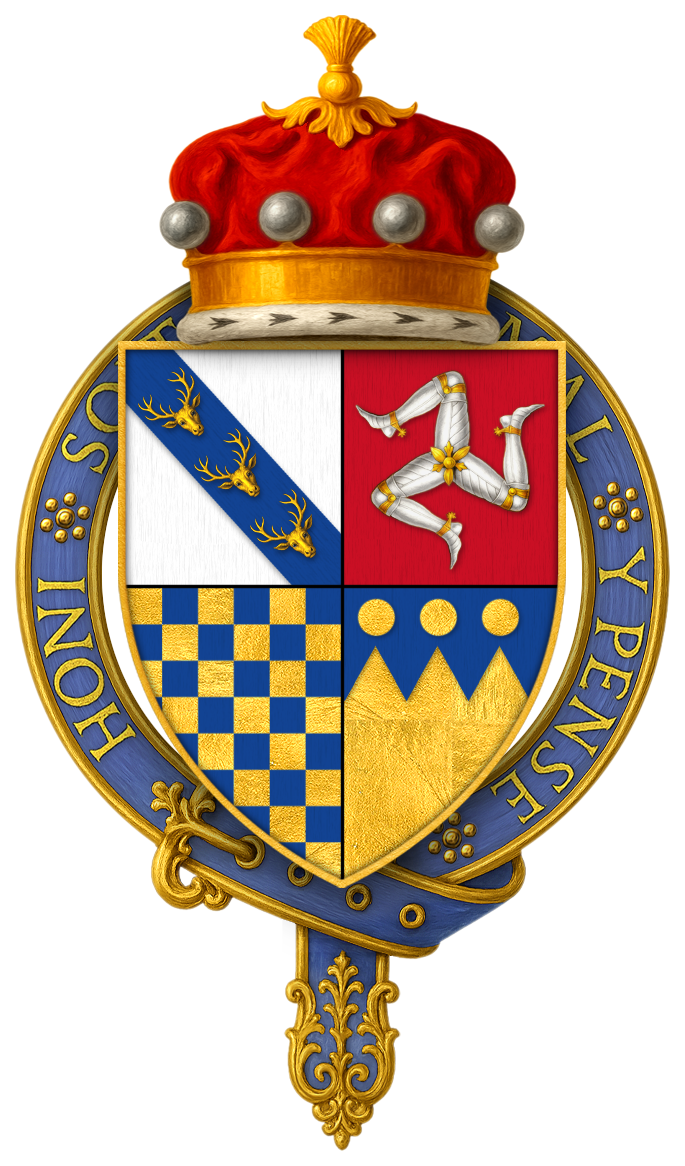
Sir Thomas Stanley, 2nd Baron Stanley, KG

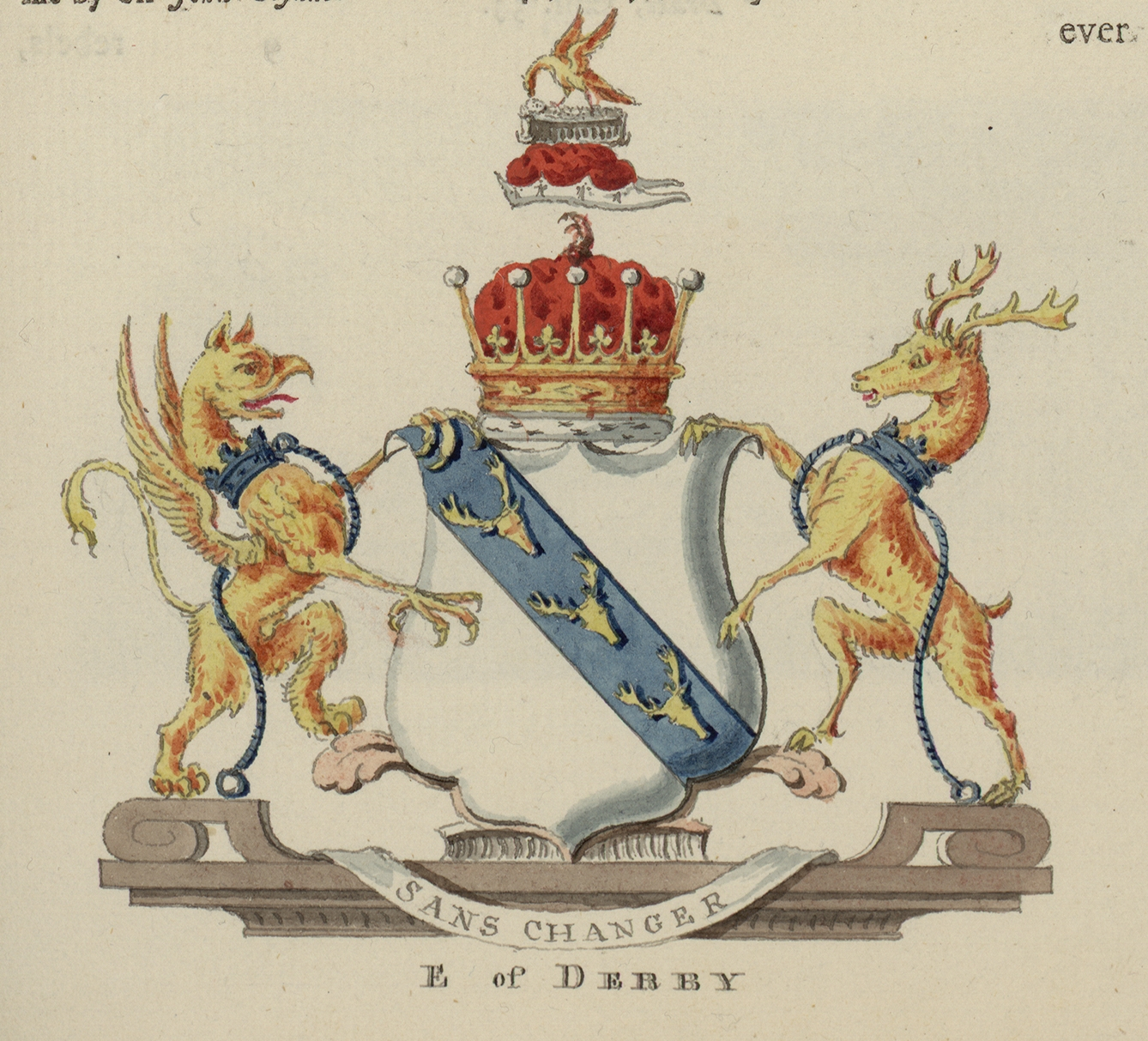
Arms of the Earls of Derby

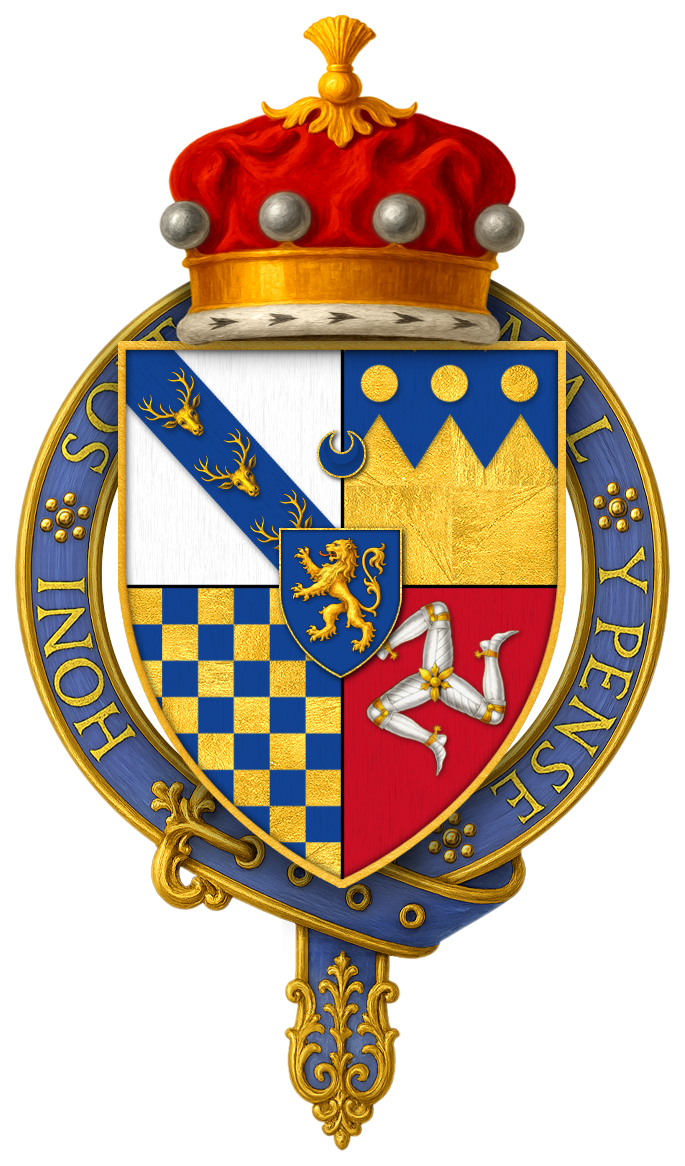
Arms of Sir Edward Stanley, 1st Baron Monteagle

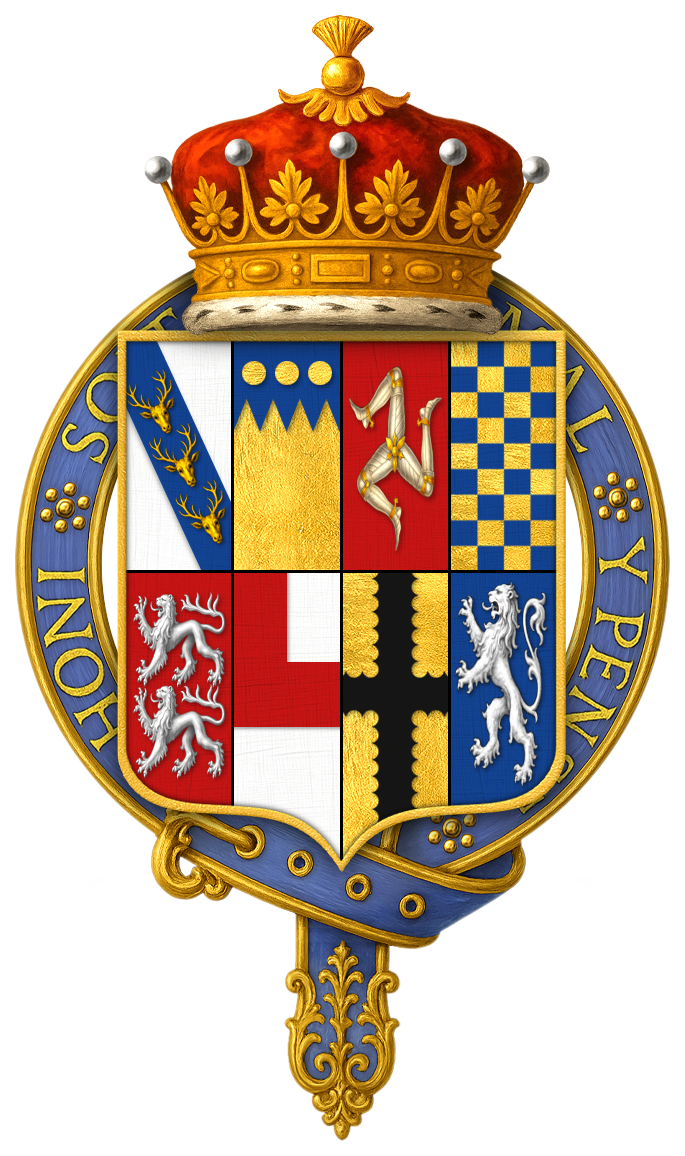
Edward Stanley, 3rd Earl of Derby

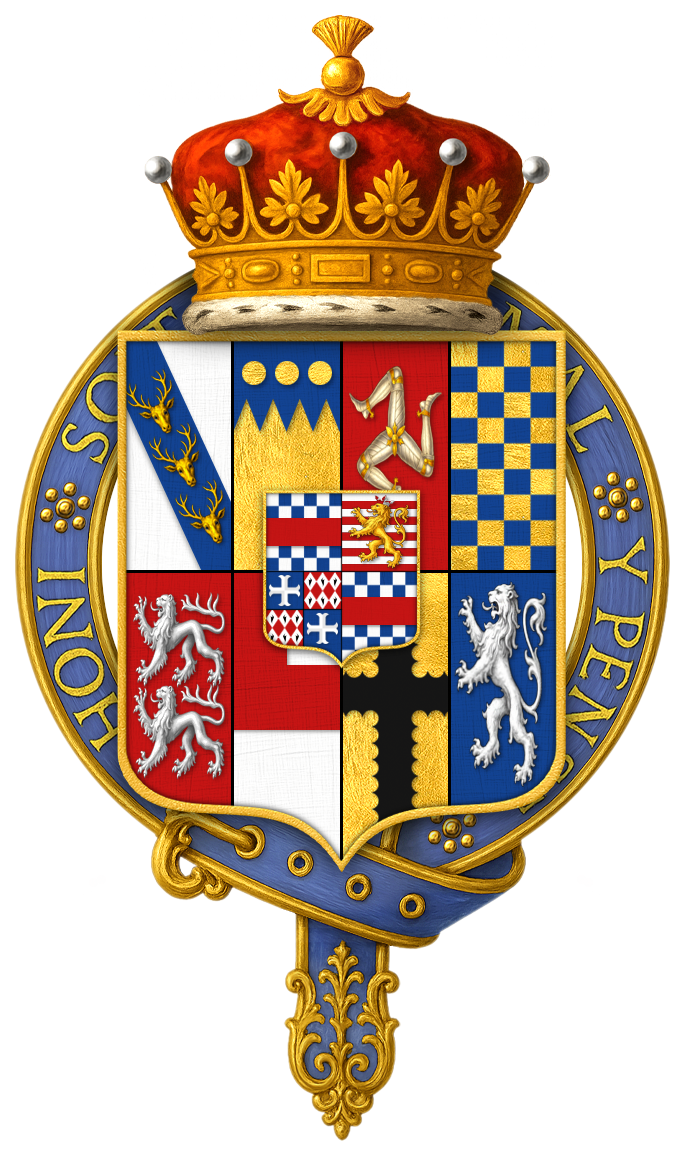
Henry Stanley, 4th Earl of Derby

== See also ==
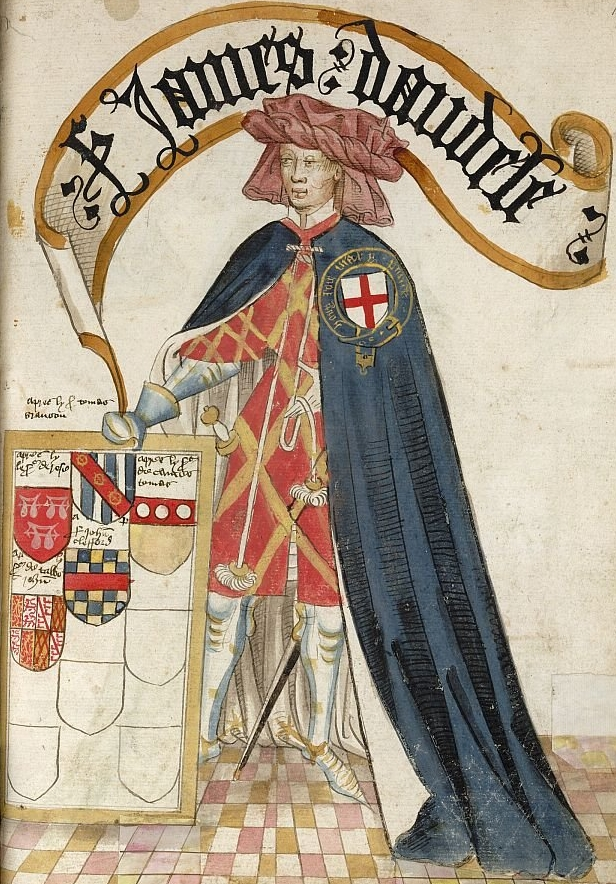
Sir James Audley, was among the first founders of the Noble Order of the Garter, an order of chivalry

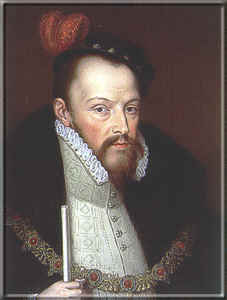
Thomas Stanley, 2nd Earl of Derby, the Earl is given a major role in William Shakespeare's play named Richard III

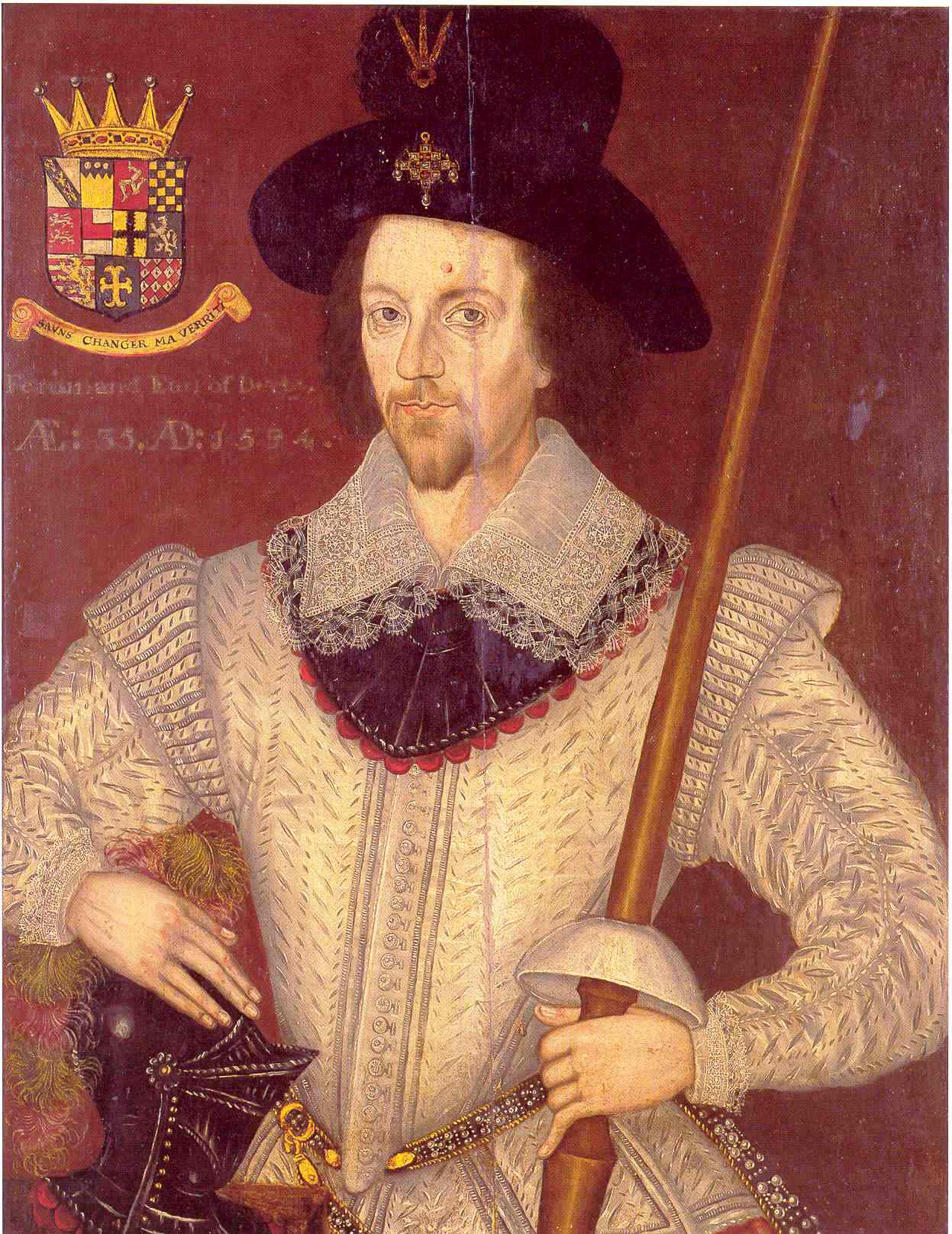
Ferdinando Stanley, 5th Earl of Derby, patron of William Shakespeare

  - Henry de Aldithley/Audley c. 1175–1246, Lord of the Welsh Marches, governor of Carmarthen castle and Cardigan Castle, Sheriff of Salop and Staffordshire from 1216 until 1221, constable of Shrewsbury Castle and Bridgnorth Castle, Governor of Shrewsbury, Chester Castle and Beeston Castle, governor of Newcastle-under-Lyne. He married Bertred Mainwaring.
  - James de Aldithley c. 1220–1272, a prominent marcher lord and High Sheriff of Staffordshire and Shropshire.
  - Emma de Audley c. 1224, daughter of Henry de Audley & Bertrade de Mainwaring, who married Gruffydd II ap Madog, Lord of Dinas Bran, Prince of Powys
  - Hugh de Audley, 1st Earl of Gloucester c. 1291 – 10 November 1347
  - James Audley founder knight of the Order of the Garter c. 1316–1386
  - Margaret de Audley, 2nd Baroness Audley c. 1318–1347, successor of her father, Hugh de Audley, 1st Earl of Gloucester and wife of Ralph de Stafford, 1st Earl of Stafford
  - James Touchet, 5th Baron Audley
  - Thomas Audley, 1st Baron Audley of Walden Lord Chancellor
- Baron Audley
- Earl of Derby, first creation and later creations
- Baron Stanley
- Baron Stanley of Alderley
  - William Audley, 1082-1165
  - Adam de Stanley, 1125-1200
  - Sir William de Stanley, 1170-1236
  - Sir Walter de Stanley, died 1285
  - Sir William de Stanley, 13th century
  - Sir John de Stanley, 1292-1361, Lord of Stourton
  - Sir William Stanley, 1311-1389
  - Sir John Stanley, died 1414, Lord Lieutenant of Ireland 1389–91, 1399–1402, 1413–4, Lord and titular King of Mann from 1405.
  - Sir John Stanley died 1437, Lord and titular King of Mann from 1414.
  - Thomas Stanley, 1st Baron Stanley 1405–1459 King of Mann, Lord Lieutenant of Ireland, Constable of Chester Castle, Comptroller of the Royal Household in 1439.
  - Thomas Stanley, 1st Earl of Derby 1435–1504
  - Thomas Stanley, 2nd Earl of Derby 1477–1521
  - Edward Stanley, 3rd Earl of Derby 1509–1572, Lord High Steward.
  - Henry Stanley, 4th Earl of Derby 1531–1593, Lord of Mann
  - Ferdinando, the fifth Earl of Derby, Baron Strange of Knockin, 1559–1594, patron of, amongst others, William Shakespeare
  - Lady Frances Stanley 1583–1636, daughter of Ferdinando (who married John Egerton, 1st Earl of Bridgewater, son of Thomas Egerton, 1st Viscount Brackley, Chancellor of England, created 1st Lord Ellesmere)
  - Edward Stanley, Earls of Derby
- Stanley (surname) List of people with Stanley surname
