= Chartley =

Chartley may refer to:

== Places ==
- Chartley Castle lies in ruins to the north of the village of Stowe-by-Chartley in Staffordshire
- Chartley Moss, a biological Site of Special Scientific Interest in Staffordshire
- Chartley railway station, former British railway station to serve the village of Stowe-by-Chartley in Staffordshire
- Stowe-by-Chartley, a village and civil parish in Staffordshire
- Chartley, Massachusetts, a village in the town of Norton

== Barons ==
- Baron Ferrers of Chartley, created on February 6, 1299 for John de Ferrers, 1st Baron Ferrers of Chartley
- John de Ferrers, 1st Baron Ferrers of Chartley (1271–1312)
- Robert de Ferrers, 3rd Baron Ferrers of Chartley (1309–1350)
- John de Ferrers, 4th Baron Ferrers of Chartley (1331–1367)
- Robert de Ferrers, 5th Baron Ferrers of Chartley (1358–1413)
- Edmund de Ferrers, 6th Baron Ferrers of Chartley (1386–1435)
- Walter Devereux, 8th Baron Ferrers of Chartley (1431–1485)
- John Devereux, 9th Baron Ferrers of Chartley (1463–1501)
