= Robert de Ferrers =

Robert de Ferrers or Robert Ferrers may refer to:

- Robert de Ferrers, 1st Earl of Derby (c. 1062–1139)
- Robert de Ferrers, 2nd Earl of Derby (died 1162)
- Robert de Ferrers, 6th Earl of Derby (1239–1279)
- Robert de Ferrers, 3rd Baron Ferrers of Chartley (1309–1350)
- Robert de Ferrers, 5th Baron Ferrers of Chartley (c. 1358–1413)
- Robert Ferrers of Wem(c. 1373–1396), English aristocrat
- Robert Farrar (MP), 16th-century politician
