= Hugh de Audley =

Hugh de Audley may refer to:

- Sir Hugh de Audley, 1st Baron Audley of Stratton Audley (c. 1276–1325), English noble
- Hugh de Audley, 1st Earl of Gloucester (c. 1291–1347), English ambassador to France
