= Robert Farrar (disambiguation) =

Robert Farrar is a British writer.

Robert Farrar may also refer to:

- Robert Farrar (MP) (died 1572/76), English politician

== See also ==
- Robert Ferrar (died 1555), bishop
- Robert Ferrers (disambiguation)
