= Hulton Abbey =

Cistercian monastery in Staffordshire, England

- Interactive map of Hulton Abbey

Monastery information
- Order: Cistercian
- Established: 1223
- Disestablished: 1538
- Dedication: Virgin Mary

People
- Founder: Henry de Audley

Site
- Location: Abbey Hulton, Stoke-on-Trent, England
- Coordinates: 53°02′22″N 2°08′33″W
- Public access: Yes

Hulton Abbey is a scheduled monument in the United Kingdom, a former monastery located in what is now Abbey Hulton, a suburb of Stoke-on-Trent. A daughter house of the Cistercian Combermere Abbey, the abbey was founded by Henry de Audley in the early 13th century. Throughout its life, the abbey was relatively small and poor, with one of the lowest incomes of all Staffordshire religious houses. The abbey was dissolved by Henry VIII in 1538, with its land and assets being sold.

Little remains of the abbey today, but continued excavations have revealed the foundations of a number of the principal claustral buildings, as well as human burials. In 1963, Hulton Abbey was designated a scheduled monument, under the Ancient Monuments and Archaeological Areas Act 1979, however due to its poor condition it is considered Heritage at Risk. The site is now owned and managed by Stoke-on-Trent City Council.

== History ==
=== Origins and foundation ===
Between the late 6th century and the reign of Henry VIII, over 700 monastic communities were founded in England; of these, at least 75 were founded by members of the Cistercian order. The size of these communities varied from several hundred members to only a handful. During medieval times, monasteries were important contributors to the surrounding community. They were centres of education, charity and worship, with the largest and wealthiest establishments wielding a degree of political influence. The Cistercians emphasised a life of manual labour, prayer and self-sufficiency. Many of their abbeys traditionally supported themselves through agriculture.

Hulton Abbey was founded in 1223 by a local landowner, Henry de Audley, as a daughter house of the Cistercian Combermere Abbey in Cheshire. The site chosen, like those of many Cistercian abbeys, was remote, being situated on the eastern side of the upper Trent valley; some of the donated land was inherited by Henry from his mother, with the remainder being specially purchased. It was the last of three Cistercian monasteries built in Staffordshire, the first two being Croxden Abbey and Dieulacres Abbey. Audley founded the abbey, like many noblemen of his time, for the benefit of his family's souls; the monks would be expected to celebrate mass for the souls of "Henry, Henry's predecessors and successors, and all the faithful departed". Further grants of land were made in the mid-thirteenth century by other local landowners, including Simon de Verney and Henry de Verdon at Normacot and Bucknall, respectively.

=== Later development ===
The abbey continued to benefit from the patronage of the Audley family. James Audley, 2nd Baron Audley presented a number of advowsons to the abbey throughout the 1340s, including that of Biddulph, Staffordshire in 1340, Marwood, Devon in 1348 and Audley, Staffordshire in 1349. Royal licence had not previously been secured for the 1349 grant and a 200 mark fine was imposed by the king before they were allowed to retain the church. Despite its estate holdings, the abbey was relatively poor and this fine was reduced by half in 1351. James was subsequently buried in the church, along with his son Nicholas Audley, 3rd Baron Audley and his wife Elizabeth, who left the abbey a sum of 400 marks in her will.

Although mainly sheep farmers in the 13th century, the monks also engaged in other activities. A tannery and fulling-mill were maintained in the local area to supplement their income. There is evidence that the monks were producing encaustic tiles, and by the 16th century were operating a smithy in Horton and coal mines in Hulton and Hanley. Hulton Abbey was relatively small, with its poverty, when compared to other Staffordshire religious houses, only Brewood Priory being more impoverished. Due to the low income, in 1351, the 1349 fine of 200 marks was halved by the king "out of compassion for the poverty of the house". Their finances worsened with the onset of the Black Death; the abbey's annual income fell from over £26 in 1291, to just £14 by 1354.

=== Dissolution ===
Initially prompted by a dispute over the annulment of the marriage of King Henry VIII to Catherine of Aragon, the Church of England separated from the Roman Catholic Church in 1534 and became the established church by the Act of Supremacy, beginning a series of events known as the English Reformation. In 1535, parliament passed the Suppression of Religious Houses Act 1535. The act ordered the suppression of all religious houses with an annual income of less than £200, with their assets and lands being passed to The Crown.

With an income of only £87 10s. 1½d in 1535, the abbey should have been dissolved. Despite this, the Crown granted an exemption in exchange for a fine of £66 13s. 4d. In 1538 Brian Tuke, Treasurer of the Household, petitioned the Crown to grant the abbey and its lands to his son-in-law, George Tuchet, 9th Baron Audley, claiming that the abbot was willing to resign. However, when the abbot did surrender the abbey in September 1538, the property did not pass to Lord Audley but was instead sold to Edward Aston. The king granted the monks pensions, with the last abbot, Edward Wilkyns, receiving a sum of £20 a year. Following the Dissolution, the abbey quickly fell into ruin. The bells were sold, the roof lead removed and the stone used as a source of new building material.

== Architecture ==
Archaeological evidence suggests that the site included a number of principal buildings, including the abbey church, chapter house, dormitories and refectory. These main structures were arranged around a square cloister, with the church positioned on the northern side. The church was of a standard, cruciform design. It measured 42.5m long and 32m wide, was built in stone and had a relatively short nave. Each end of the transept featured two adjoining chapels. The chancel and the south transept are thought to have been built first, with the remainder of the church being constructed later. The chapter house is of a rectangular design and was built in 1270.

Excavations have shown that the chapter house and church featured some of the earliest examples of bar tracery windows in the British Isles. There is further evidence of the tracery bars being replaced several times throughout the 14th century.

== Archaeology and conservation ==
By the 19th century the site was used for entirely for agriculture, on land owned by Carmount Farm. It was not until 1884, during drainage works in the area, that the abbey was rediscovered. Small scale archaeological excavations were completed throughout the 20th century, with the first major programme of work being undertaken between 1987 and 1994 by Stoke-on-Trent City Council. The works uncovered the eastern half of the church's nave and its north aisle, as well as the chapter house, dormitories, a kitchen and a refectory. The church foundations remain visible while the majority of the other abbey structures "survive well as buried features".

In 1963, Hulton Abbey was designated a Scheduled Monument, and is protected under the Ancient Monuments and Archaeological Areas Act 1979. The site has been further identified by Historic England as Heritage at Risk, with the visible remains identified as "vulnerable to weathering and stone decay". The site's condition is described as "poor" and in need of repair.

=== Burials ===
The main graveyard was situated to the north-east of the church. The excavation works between 1987 and 1994 uncovered the remains of 91 individuals; the large proportion were of men but those of women and children have also been identified. A number of artifacts have been discovered with the excavated burials, including a pilgrim's staff and a wax chalice. A wax seal, with the impression of the church of Santo Spirito in Sassia, Rome, was found with one set of remains. Professor John Cherry has posited that the seal was attached to an indulgence obtained whilst on a pilgrimage.

The graves of the Audley family, other local aristocracy and senior clergy members can be found in the church itself. Originally, burial here would have been reserved only for the Audley family, but by 1322 this right had been extended to anyone who had contributed to the construction of the church.

==== Hugh Despenser the Younger ====
During the 1970s, the remains of a decapitated and disarticulated male, missing several vertebrae and a thighbone, were found at Hulton Abbey. Their location in the chancel suggested that the bones belonged to either a wealthy member of the congregation or a member of the benefactor's family. In 2004 the remains were transferred to the University of Reading, where analysis suggested that the body had been hung, drawn and quartered. Radiocarbon analysis dated the body to between 1050 and 1385, and later tests suggested it to be that of a man over 34 years old.

In 2008, Dr Mary Lewis of the University of Reading identified the remains as belonging to Hugh Despenser the Younger. Despenser was the son of Hugh Despenser the Elder, Earl of Winchester, and was related by marriage to the Audley family. (Note: Hugh Despenser the Younger was married to Eleanor de Clare, whose sister Margaret de Clare was the wife of Hugh de Audley, 1st Earl of Gloucester. Through their mother Joan of Acre, Eleanor and Margaret were granddaughters of Edward III, and thus nieces of Edward II.) As a favourite, and purported lover, of Edward II, he held great influence at court; Despenser's political manoeuvrings earned him a number of enemies, including the king's estranged wife Queen Isabella. These enemies proved to be his downfall when, in 1326, Isabella and her ally, Roger Mortimer, 1st Earl of March, deposed Edward II and sentenced Despenser to death as a traitor. On Isabella's orders, he was hung, drawn and quartered.

On 24 November 1326…Despenser was roped to four horses…and dragged through the city to the walls of his own castle, where enormous gallows had been specially constructed…Despenser was raised a full 50 feet…and was lowered onto the ladder. A man climbed along side him sliced off his penis and testicles, flinging them into the fire below…he then plunged a knife into Despenser's abdomen and cut out his entrails and heart…the corpse was lowered to the ground and the head cut off. It was later sent to London, and Despenser's arms, torso and legs were sent to be displayed above the gates of Newcastle, York, Dover and Bristol.

Lewis based her identification on a number of factors including Despencer's relationship to the abbey's benefactors, the age of the remains and the cause of death. The missing bones were also cited as proof; in 1330, Hugh de Despenser's widow, Eleanor de Clare, petitioned the crown for the return of her husband's remains, but is said to have only secured his head, thigh bone and a number of vertebrae.

==== Other burials ====
- Henry Audley, and his wife Bertha, daughter of Ralph de Mesnilwarin
- James Audley, 2nd Baron Audley
- Nicholas Audley, 3rd Baron Audley
- Elizabeth Beaumont de Audley, daughter of Henry de Beaumont and Alice Comyn, Countess of Buchan

== References and sources ==
=== Sources ===
- Boothroyd, Noel; Klemperer, William (2005). Excavations at Hulton Abbey, Staffordshire 1987-1994 (Society for Medieval Archaeology Monograph). Maney Publishing=Leeds, UK. ISBN 9781904350309.
