= Richard Beauchamp, 2nd Baron Beauchamp =

English noble

Richard Beauchamp, 2nd Baron Beauchamp of Powick (c. 1435 – 19 January 1502/3) was an English peer.

== Family origins ==
He was the son of John Beauchamp, 1st Baron Beauchamp (fifth creation), 1st Lord of Powick (d. 1475) and Margaret de Ferrers, possibly daughter of Edmund de Ferrers, 6th Baron Ferrers of Chartley.

== Career ==
As Sir Richard Beauchamp, of Kemerton and Boddington, he threw aside his father's Lancastrian ties to hold the gates of Gloucester closed against Queen Margaret on the morning of Friday, 3 May 1471, so denying her army use of the Severn Bridge and an escape route into Wales. As she moved north he harried the Lancastrian rear and captured some weapons on the road to Tewkesbury. He fought at the battle of Tewkesbury and was knighted. Soon after, his adulterous wife, Elizabeth, was accused of conspiring his death, with her relation and Beauchamp's litigious neighbour, Thomas Burdet. John Stacey and Thomas Blake were also involved and all three were later accused of imagining the King's death. Burdet and Stacey were hanged at Tyburn. Blake was pardoned.

== Family ==
On 27 January 1447 in his private chapel at Beauchamp's Court, Alcester, Warwickshire he married Elizabeth, daughter of Humphrey Stafford of Grafton by special licence. Their children were:

- Sir John, died young
- Elizabeth (d.1503), married, Robert Willoughby, 2nd Baron Willoughby de Broke (d. 1521),
- Anne, married, Richard Lygon, of Madresfield, Worcs
- Margaret, married, William Rede of Gloucester (father of Richard Rede/Reade).

Beauchamp died on 19 January 1502/1503, at Broomhill when the Barony expired. His three surviving daughters, Elizabeth, Margaret and Anne, became his co-heirs.

Peerage of England
Preceded by John Beauchamp	Baron Beauchamp of Powick; 1475–1502/3	Extinct
