= Heighley Castle =

Ruined castle in Staffordshire, England

Coordinates: 53.0174°N 2.3408°W

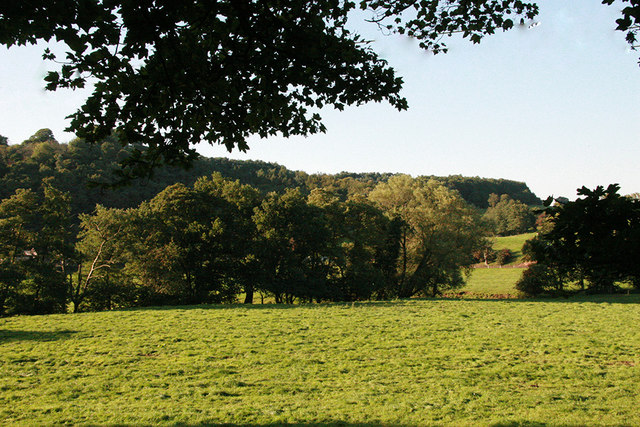
Hilltop site of Heighley Castle

Heighley Castle (or Heleigh Castle) is a ruined medieval castle near Madeley, Staffordshire. The castle was completed by the Audley family in 1233 and for over 300 years was one of their ancestral homes. It was held for Charles I during the English Civil War and was destroyed by Parliamentary forces in the 1640s. The ruinous remains comprise masonry fragments, mostly overgrown by vegetation. The site is protected by Grade II listed building status and is a Scheduled Ancient Monument. The castle is privately owned and is not open to visitors.

The castle is on Historic England's Heritage at Risk Register and described as being in 'very bad' condition.

== History ==
Heleigh Castle was built by Henry de Aldithley (c.1175-1246) (later "de Audley"), Sheriff of Shropshire 1227–1232. He also built the nearby Red Castle, Shropshire. He endowed the nearby Cistercian Abbey of St. Mary at Hulton in 1223, and donated to it a large amount of land, some of which was an inheritance from his mother and some of which was purchased.

== See also ==
- Listed buildings in Madeley, Staffordshire

== Sources ==
- Greenslade, M. W. & Pugh, R. B., eds. (1970). "11. Houses of Cistercian monks: The abbey of Hulton". A History of the County of Stafford. Victoria County History. Vol. 3. pp. 235–237.
- English Heritage: architectural description of listed building
