= Huntingdon Hall =

Theatre and music venue in Worcester, England

Coordinates: 52°11′30″N 2°13′20″W

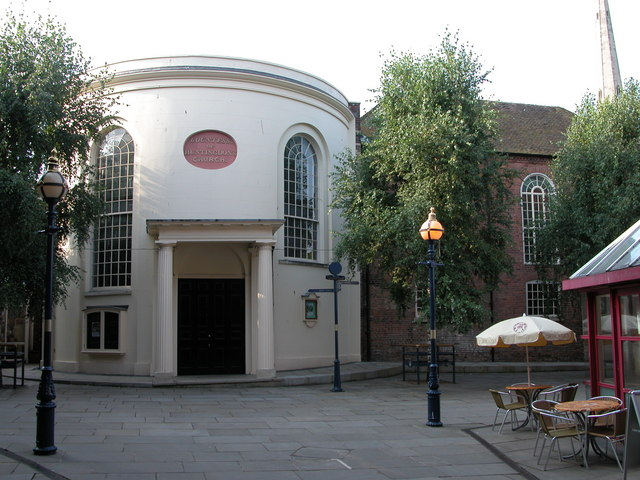
- The main entrance of the Hall
- Interactive map of the Huntingdon Hall area
- Former names: Countess of Huntingdon's Chapel

General information
- Location: Bell Square, Crowngate, Worcester, England

Listed Building – Grade II*
- Official name: Huntingdon Hall
- Designated: 22 May 1954
- Reference no.: 1063893

Huntingdon Hall is a Grade II* listed theatre and concert venue located in Worcester, England.

It was built in 1773 and opened on the 31st of October of that year as the Countess of Huntingdon's Church by her first cousin Walter Shirley. Selina Hastings, the Countess of Huntingdon, described the building as 'exceedingly handsome' in a letter to her friend John Hawksworth.

In his book Worcestershire, Nikolaus Pevsner describes Huntingdon Hall as "an odd plan... a three-bay chapel with a hipped roof and behind it, transversely, a large oblong part apsed at both ends."

== History ==
Selina Hastings, Countess of Huntingdon was an English religious leader who founded the Countess of Huntingdon's Connexion. The connexion was (and still is) a small society of English churches which split with the Church of England. The Countess established several churches for the Connexion across England, such as the New Connexions Free Church in Ely and Jarvis Hall in Steyning, West Sussex. Hastings died in 1783, but the movement she founded had lasting influence; in 1804 Huntingdon Hall was established as a church of the Connexion.

The Hall operated as a chapel until closing in 1970. It reopened in 1987 after a renovation by the City of Worcester Building Preservation Trust. Since its re-opening, Huntingdon Hall has been used as a theatre and concert venue; today, the hall is one of two theatres run by the Worcester Theatres Charitable Trust, the other being the Swan Theatre. The building can seat 350 people.

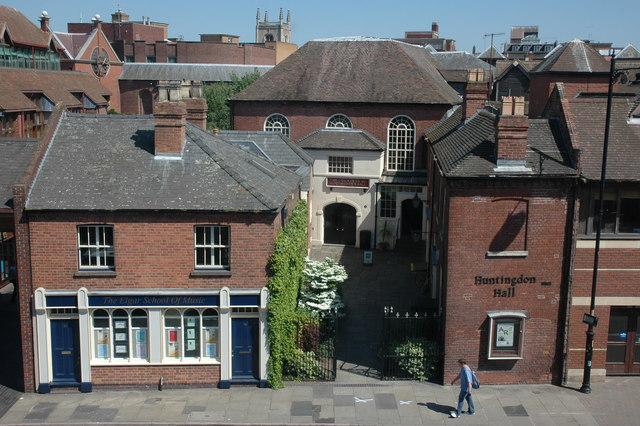
Huntingdon Hall (in the middle) as seen from the south-west. The "oblong part" which Pevsner alludes to can be seen in this image
