= John Beauchamp, 1st Baron Beauchamp (fifth creation) =

English nobleman and administrator

John Beauchamp
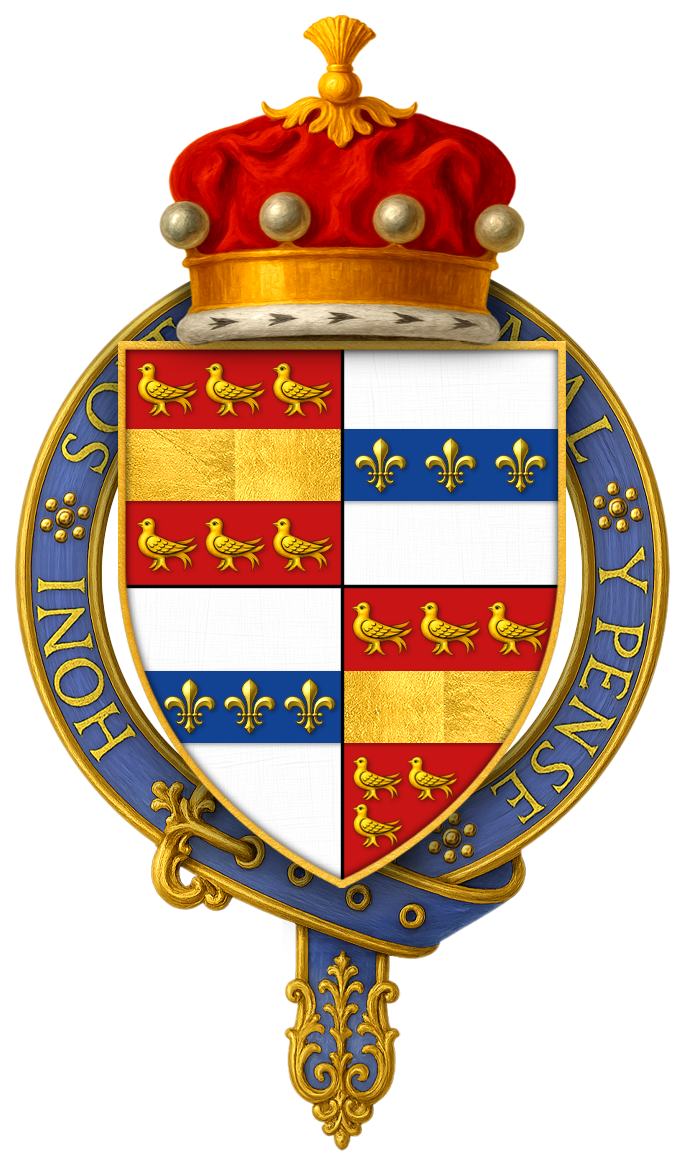
- Arms of Sir John Beauchamp, Baron Beauchamp of Powick, KG: Beauchamp of Powick quartering Usflete

Lord High Treasurer
- In office 22 June, 1450 – 15 April, 1452
- Preceded by: James Fiennes
- Succeeded by: John Tiptoft

Personal details
- Born: c. 1400–1410
- Died: 9–19 April, 1475 Powick, Worcestershire, England
- Resting place: Dominican friary, Worcester, England

John Beauchamp, 1st Baron Beauchamp of Powick (c. 1400/1410 – April, 1475), was an English nobleman and administrator. He was the son and eventual heir of Sir William Beauchamp of Powick in Worcestershire (c. 1370 – c. 1421), Constable of Gloucester Castle, by his wife, Katherine Usflete (d. after 1436), daughter and heiress of Sir Gerard de Usflete, a Member of Parliament for Yorkshire in 1401.

Beauchamp's father, a near kinsman of the Earls of Warwick, had been a royal retainer under Richard II, Henry IV, and Henry V. On his father's death he also entered the king's service in the Hundred Years' War. During the 1420s Beauchamp served under the Duke of Bedford in medieval France : he was captain of Pont-de-l'Arche in 1422–1429, lieutenant of Rouen Castle in 1429, a participant in the Maine–Anjou campaigns, and a counsellor to the duke and member of his household. About the time of Henry VI's visit to France for his coronation, in 1430–1432, however, he seems to have taken up a permanent post within the king's domestic establishment. Some time before 1434 he married Margaret de Ferrers, possibly daughter of Edmund de Ferrers, 6th Baron Ferrers of Chartley.

The death of his kinsman Richard de Beauchamp, 13th Earl of Warwick in 1439 seems to have been the first major turning point of John Beauchamp's career, when he became joint guardian of the extensive lands of Henry de Beauchamp, 1st Duke of Warwick. During the following decade Beauchamp's importance grew. In 1439 or 1440 he rose up the household ladder to become Master of the King's Horse. In 1445 he became a Knight of the Garter. At about the same time he seems to have inherited his father's estates, with their centres at Powick and at Alcester in Warwickshire, and became the major power in the west midlands. On the death of the Duke of Warwick in 1446, Sir John felt sufficiently confident to launch a claim for the earldom of Warwick itself. While the powerful interests clustered around the duke's female heirs ensured his failure, Beauchamp was able to exact a handsome price for his acquiescence. Amid a series of grants made in 1446–7, including his father's old office of Constable of Gloucester and the post of Justice of South Wales, he was on 2 May 1447 elevated to the peerage as Lord Beauchamp of Powick.

Beauchamp emerged unscathed - even enhanced - from the crisis of 1449–1450 which brought about the downfall of so many of his colleagues. On 22 June 1450 he succeeded the hated Lord Saye and Sele as Lord Treasurer of England, a post which he held for the next two years. Policy during his tenure was probably more determined by the conflicting designs of parliament and the recipients of royal patronage than by his agency. He seems to have done well financially out of his office, departing with a reward of £400. Beauchamp's tenure as Lord High Treasurer occurred during the Great Bullion Famine and the Great Slump in England.

Between 1450 and 1453 he remained a central figure in the royal household, under the Duke of Somerset, but he avoided being implicated in the duke's more partisan activities. Beauchamp maintained a low profile during the crisis of 1453–1454: he stayed at Henry VI's side during the latter's madness, and was allotted a place as one of two 'barons' of the household in the Yorkist ordinances of November 1454.

If Somerset intended to enlist him as an ally by appointing him as a councillor on 21 February 1455, he did not succeed. Beauchamp attended the council sporadically but he played no part in the battle of St Albans a few months later. A poem of 1458 identified him as a member of the royalist party, but this is almost certainly to be explained by his long-standing place at court, where he became Steward of the Household in the second half of 1457. There is no evidence either that he ever fought for Lancaster, or that Edward IV's new regime was hostile towards him.

In February 1462 Beauchamp received a pardon, and in October of that year an exemption from the obligations of office, on the grounds of his great age. Thus with the downfall of Henry VI he went into retirement rather than opposition, failing to help either king against his enemies in the rebellions of 1469–1471. He died between 9 and 19 April 1475 and was buried in the Dominican friary at Worcester. His wife Margaret was also buried there when she died in 1487.

He was succeeded by his son, Richard Beauchamp, 2nd Baron Beauchamp of Powick.

== Sources ==
- Oxford Dictionary of National Biography
- G.E. Cokayne.(1910–1959). The Complete Peerage of England, Scotland, Ireland, Great Britain and the United Kingdom, Extant, Extinct or Dormant.

Political offices
Preceded by James Fiennes	Lord High Treasurer; 1450–1452	Succeeded by The Lord Tiptoft
Peerage of England
New creation	Baron Beauchamp of Powick; 1447–1475	Succeeded by Richard Beauchamp
