= Robert de Ferrers, 5th Baron Ferrers of Chartley =

Robert de Ferrers, 5th Baron Ferrers of Chartley (c. 1358 – 1413) was the son of John de Ferrers, 4th Baron Ferrers of Chartley and Elizabeth de Stafford, a daughter of Ralph de Stafford, 1st Earl of Stafford and Margaret de Audley.

He inherited the title of Baron Ferrers of Chartley upon his father's death at the Battle of Nájera on 3 April 1367 but was never summoned to parliament.

Robert married Margaret le Despenser (born around 1360) a daughter of Edward le Despencer, 1st Baron le Despencer, KG, and Lady Elizabeth Burghersh.

The couple had one son Edmund, who became Edmund de Ferrers, 6th Baron Ferrers of Chartley upon the death of his father around 1412, and one daughter Philippa, who married Sir Thomas Greene, Sheriff of Northamptonshire (10 February 1399 – 18 January 1462), by whom she was the grandmother of Sir Thomas Green. Philippe and Sir Thomas are ancestors to Queen Consort Katherine Parr, the last wife of King Henry VIII.

Robert de Ferrers, 5th Baron Ferrers of Chartley died sometime around 1413 and is buried at Merevale Abbey in Warwickshire.

== See also ==
- Earl of Stafford
- Earl of Derby

== Notes ==
Peerage of England
Preceded by John de Ferrers	Baron Ferrers of Chartley; 1367–1413	Succeeded by Edmund de Ferrers
