= Abbey Hulton =

Area of Stoke-on-Trent, England

Coordinates: 53.02°N 02.13°W

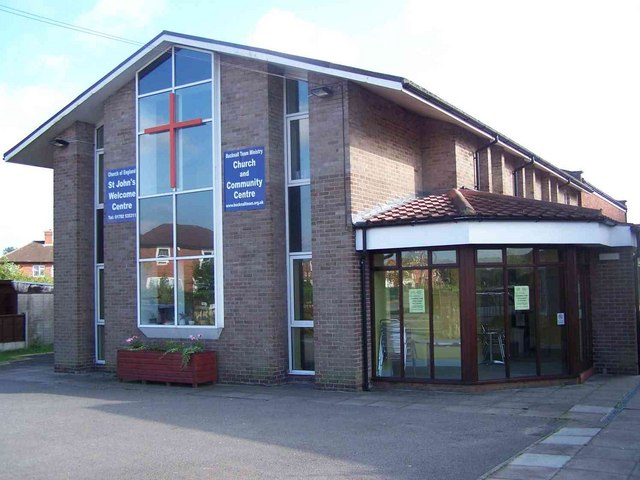
- Abbey Hulton, St. John

- Location within Staffordshire
- Population: 9,918 (2011 ward of Abbey Hulton and Townsend)
- OS grid reference: SJ9148
- Shire county: Staffordshire
- Region: West Midlands
- Country: England
- Sovereign state: United Kingdom
- Post town: Stoke-on-Trent
- Postcode district: ST2
- Police: Staffordshire
- Fire: Staffordshire
- Ambulance: West Midlands

Abbey Hulton is an area of Stoke-on-Trent, Staffordshire, England, named after the abbey that existed between the 13th and 16th centuries.

== History ==
The name Abbey Hulton is derived from 'hilltown' (Anglo-Saxon hyll + tūn; Middle English hil, hull + toun; 13th & 14th century Hulton) with the addition of 'abbey' from the Cistercian abbey founded here in 1223. It is recorded in the Domesday Book of 1086 as Heltone, in Pirehill Hundred, when it was held by Robert of Stafford.

Henry de Aldithley (or Audley) endowed the Cistercian Abbey of St. Mary at Hulton, near the site of Heighley Castle in 1223, donating a large amount of land, some of which was an inheritance from his mother and some of which was purchased. The endowment consisted of the villages of Julton and Rushton to the south of Burslem with "Manesmore", a wood at Sneyd, all Henry's land at Bucknall and Anormancot, a meadow called "bukkeley", and in the northeast of the county the village of Mixon and the "vills and tenements" of Bradnop, Middle Cliff, Apesford, "Ruhegh", and "Mulnesley" with a pasture at Morridge and a wood at "Witherward." The grant also included a yearly pension of 10 marks from Audley church. Later in 1232 Henry made a new grant of the vills of Mixon and Bradnop (probably additional land in these manors) with the services of all the inhabitants within 5 years of the death of Ranulph, Earl of Chester. This grant was given in exchange for the saying of mass by 13 monks "all the days of the world" for the souls of Ranulph (Henry's overlord, the Earl of Chester who died in 1232), Henry, Henry's predecessors and successors, and all the faithful departed. All the remainder of his life Henry de Aldithley was considered a patron of the monks at Hulton. Hulton Abbey received other gifts from the Aldithley family and other local lords over the next centuries.

Compared to the other great Abbeys of England, Hulton was small and poor. The monks engaged in agriculture, raised sheep and operated a tannery (making leather). It was taken apart (disbanded) in 1538 and its lands sold.
