= Hugh de Audley, 1st Baron Audley of Stratton Audley =

English nobleman (c. 1267–1325)

- 1st Earl of Gloucester
- Arms of Audley: Gules, a fret or
- Born: c. 1267
- Died: 1325
- Noble family: de Audley
- Spouses: Isolde, daughter of Roger le Rous and Alianore de Avenbury
- Issue: James de Audley (died 1334); Hugh de Audley; Alice de Audley
- Father: James Audley
- Mother: Ela de Longspee

Sir Hugh de Audley of Stratton Audley (c. 1267–1325), Lord of Stratton Audley, was a 13th- and 14th-century English nobleman. He acted as Constable of Montgomery Castle, Sheriff of Shropshire, Sheriff of Staffordshire, Justice of North Wales, Keeper of Selkirk Forest, and acted as an ambassador to France. Hugh participated in the rebellion of Thomas, 2nd Earl of Lancaster and surrendered prior to the Battle of Boroughbridge in 1322. He remained a prisoner held at Wallingford Castle until he died in 1325.

== Biography ==
Hugh was the fifth and youngest son of James Audley and Ela de Longspee, daughter of William Longespée the Younger. After the death of his father in 1272, Hugh inherited Stratton Audley, Oxfordshire, the dowry of his mother. During 1294 Hugh took part in King Edward I's Gascony campaign. Whilst campaigning he was captured fighting the French and was held prisoner until 2 April 1299. Between 1299 and 1302, he took part in the English campaigns in Scotland. In 1306, he served as justice of the peace in North Wales and in 1309 he was appointed Constable of Montgomery Castle. Hugh was also present at the Battle of Bannockburn against the Scots in 1314.

Audley was created Baron Audley of Stratton Audley by writ in 1321. Hugh and his younger son, also named Hugh, took part in the rebellion of the lords of the Welsh Marches against Hugh Despenser the Younger in 1321. After initial successes, Audley surrendered with his ally Maurice de Berkeley on 6 February 1322. He was imprisoned in Wallingford Castle, where the younger Hugh joined him a few weeks later after the Battle of Boroughbridge. An attempt to free prisoners from the castle in 1323 ultimately failed. Hugh died while imprisoned at the castle in 1325.

== Family ==
He married, in 1288, Isolde, the widow of Walter de Balun. She was the daughter of Roger le Rous and Alianore de Avenbury. They had the following known issue:

- James de Audley (died 1334), with his partner Eve de Clavering, had two illegitimate children, Peter and James.
- Hugh de Audley, Earl of Gloucester (died 1347), married Margaret de Clare and had a daughter, Margaret de Audley, 2nd Baroness Audley.
- Alice de Audley (died 1374) married firstly Ralph de Greystoke, 1st Baron Greystoke and, secondly, Ralph Neville, 2nd Baron Neville de Raby, and had children with both spouses.
