= Worcester Blackfriars =

Coordinates: 52.192°N 2.223°W

The Worcester Blackfriars was a monastery in England, belonging to the Dominican Order. It was founded in 1347 by William Beauchamp, Lord of Elmley. The monastery contained a school of divinity.

In 1431, a warrant was issued for the arrest of Thomas Northfield, a Friar Preacher at Worcester, and for the seizure of his magical books.

It continued its association with the Beauchamps through the 1400s, Sir John Beauchamp, K.G., baron of Powick was buried there in 1475, and his wife Margaret in 1487.

The friary was dissolved in 1538.

The site of the monastery in Worcester became a shopping centre in the 1960s, called Blackfriars. It was demolished and replaced by the Crowngate which opened in 1992.

Excavations took place in 1985–6, which uncovered the cloisters and friary church. These were aligned with the Roman Road. The small finds were repackaged by volunteers in 2010.

== Burials ==
- John Beauchamp, 1st Baron Beauchamp (fifth creation) and wife Margaret de Ferrers
