= John de Ferrers, 4th Baron Ferrers of Chartley =

John de Ferrers, 4th Baron Ferrers of Chartley (c. 1331 – 3 April 1367) was the son of Robert de Ferrers, 3rd Baron Ferrers of Chartley and a woman named Margaret.

John de Ferrers was born in Southhoe, Huntingdonshire. He inherited the title of Baron Ferrers of Chartley upon his father's death in 1350 but was never summoned to parliament.

Despite his youth, John fought in Gascony for Edward III in 1345 and married Elizabeth de Stafford (1342 – 7 August 1375) - widow of Fulk le Strange (Baron Strange) and daughter of Ralph Stafford, 1st Earl of Stafford and Margaret de Audley, a daughter of Hugh de Audley, 1st Earl of Gloucester.

The couple had one son, Robert de Ferrers, 5th Baron Ferrers of Chartley.

John de Ferrers, 4th Baron Ferrers of Chartley died on 3 April 1367 at the Battle of Nájera in Castile.

== See also ==
- Earl of Stafford
- Earl of Gloucester
- Earl of Hereford
- Earl of Derby

Peerage of England
Preceded by Robert de Ferrers	Baron Ferrers of Chartley; 1350–1367	Succeeded by Robert de Ferrers
