= Crowngate Shopping Centre =

Crowngate Shopping Centre Worcester
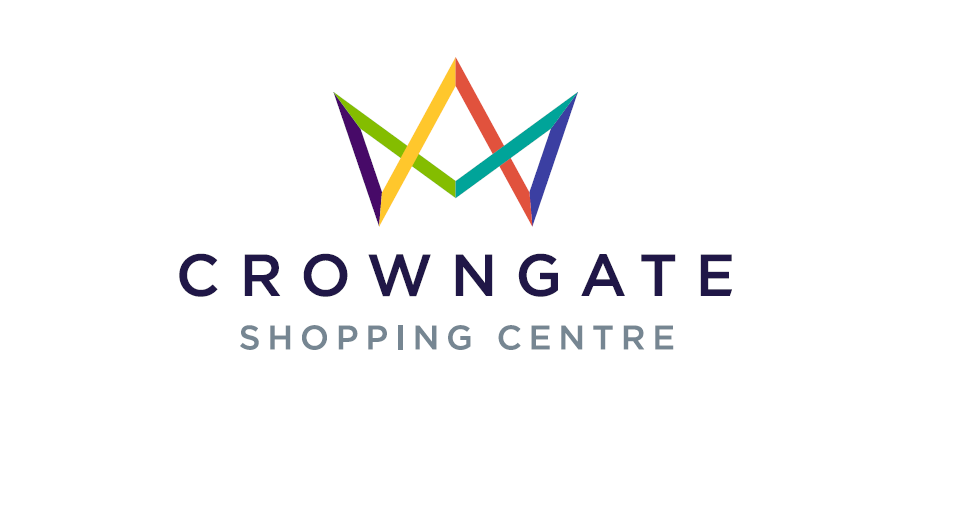

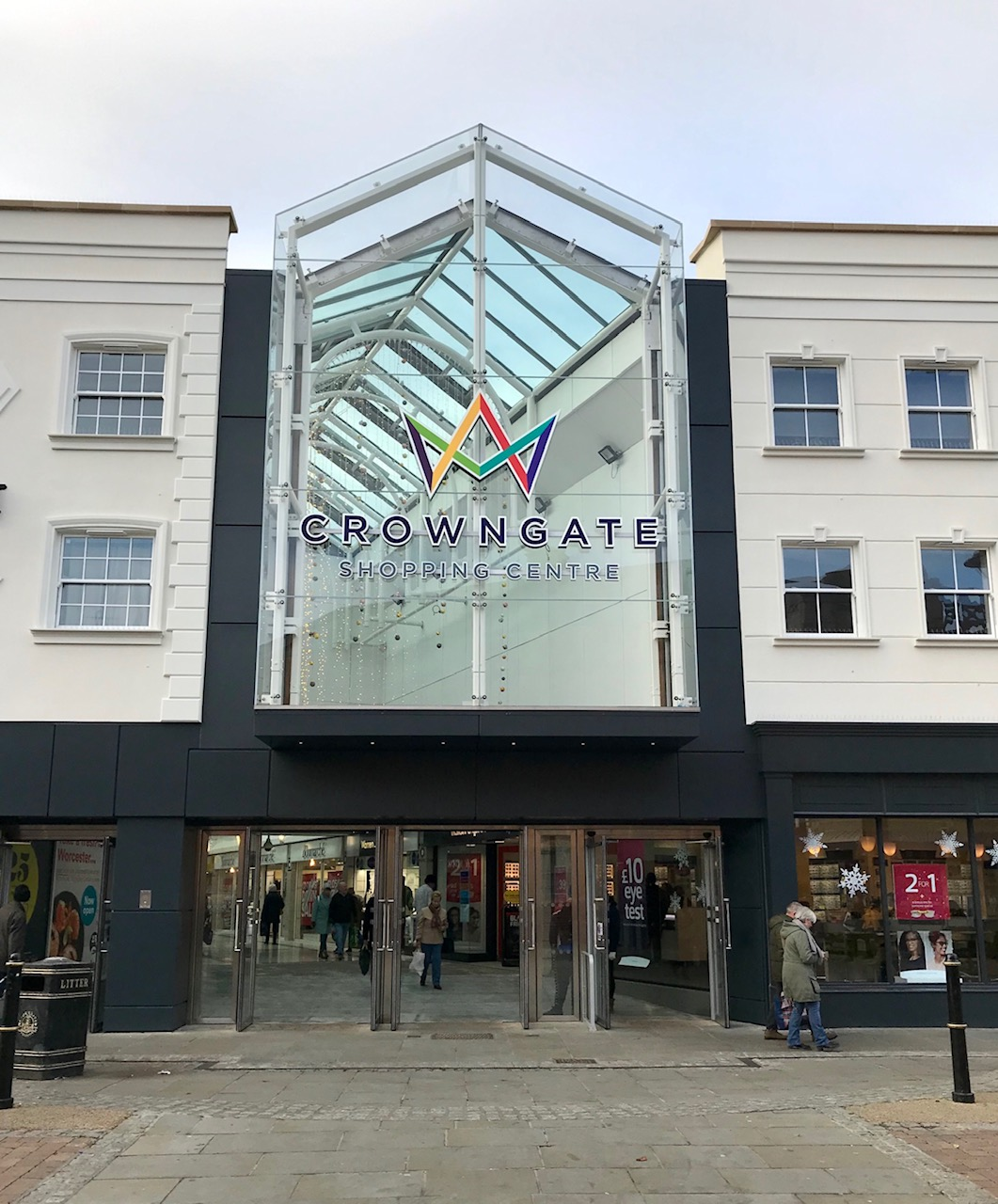
- Location: Worcester, England
- Coordinates: 52.19198°N 2.22267°W
- Opened: 1992
- Manager: King Sturge
- Owner: Crown Estate
- Num. of stores: 60
- Num. of anchor tenants: 2 House of Fraser & Primark)
- Floors: 1 (Some shops have extra floors)
- Parking: 750
- Website: crowngate-worcester.co.uk

Crowngate Worcester is a shopping centre in Worcester, England, built in part on the historic site of the Worcester Blackfriars monastery, and replacing the former Blackfriars shopping centre.

It contains forty-nine stores, with a range of both large and smaller units, including House of Fraser and Primark. There are three restaurants in the recently refurbished Friary Walk: Wildwood Kitchen, Bills restaurant and Anatolian Palace.

Other facilities include a 780 space, multi-story car park, Worcester's bus station and the Huntingdon Hall Theatre.

In October 2009 the centre underwent a £5 million refurbishment. In 2017, plans for a new look for Crowngate were published, which were completed in 2019, and gave the existing building a brand new frontage.

== Construction and excavations ==
Archaeological excavations were carried out in 1985–6, prior to the construction of the new centre. They uncovered:

- a Roman road and timber buildings
- a Saxon building and bread ovens
- the cloisters and friary church of the monastery, which were aligned with the Roman Road
- civil war defences facing towards St Johns.

Nevertheless, the nine months of funding to excavate the site "proved insufficient to complete the work and analyse the finds". The small finds were repackaged by volunteers in 2010.

There are plaques dotted around Crowngate, to be found, which tell the history of the site.

== Stores ==
Stores present include House of Fraser, Primark, Boots, The Body Shop, Claire's, Smiggle, Ryman, Warren James, Rise, New Look, Superdrug, Iceland, and Cornucopia.

== Bus Station ==
The bus station is located below the shopping centre and the main bus operator is First Midland Red.

== Routes serving the bus station ==
Route	Destination	Operator	Notes
21	St Johns	Diamond Worcestershire	
22/22A	Droitwich Spa	First Worcestershire	
27	Battenhall	First Worcestershire	
28/X28	Red Hill	First Worcestershire	Operating X28 at peak Sixth Form Times
30	Dines Green	First Worcestershire	
31/31A	Henwick Park	First Worcestershire	
32	St Peters	First Worcestershire	
34	Shire Park	First Worcestershire	
35	Blackpole	First Worcestershire	
36	Royal Hospital	First Worcestershire	
38	Royal Hospital	First Worcestershire	
39/39A	Lower Wick/Blackpole	LMS Travel	
43	Malvern Vale	First Worcestershire	Operating only during Dyson Perrins school days
44/X44	Great Malvern	First Worcestershire	
X50	Evesham & Pershore	First Worcestershire	
50/51	Pershore	First Worcestershire	Operating only during Pershore High and College days
54	Pershore	Astons Coachs	Operating only during Pershore High and College days
144	Catshill	First Worcestershire	
149/149S	Redditch	Diamond Worcestershire	
294	Kiddermister	Diamond Worcestershire	Two Journeys per day
296	Bewdley	Diamond Worcestershire	
303	Kidderminster	Diamond Worcestershire	
310	Hanley Broadheath	First Worcestershire	
311	Clifton Upon Teme	First Worcestershire	
313	Clifton Upon Teme	First Worcestershire	
314	Martley	First Worcestershire	Operating only during Martley High School days
315/316	Upper & Lower Broadheath	First Worcestershire	
332/333	St Peters & Baynhall & Upton	Astons Coachs & First Worcestershire	Operating at peak times and during Hanley Castle High School Days
333	Upton Upon Severn	First Worcestershire	Operating only during Hanley Castle School days
334	The Chase High School	First Worcestershire	Operating only during The Chase High School days
356	Stock Turn	Diamond Worcestershire	
363	Upton Upon Severn	First Worcestershire	
417	Ledbury	First Worcestershire	
420	Bromyard	First Worcestershire	Two Journeys per day
420A	Bromyard	DRM Bus	
423	Alfrick & Suckley	LMS Travel	
S6	Bevere & Blessed Edwards	First Worcestershire	Operating only during Blessed Edwards School days
