= Gerard Usflete =

Sir Gerard Usflete
- Arms of Usflete: Argent, on a fess azure three fleurs-de-lys or

Personal details
- Born: c. 1346 Whitgift, East Riding of Yorkshire, England
- Died: c. 1406 Swanland, East Riding of Yorkshire, England

Sir Gerard de Usflete, (c.1346–1406) of North Ferriby and Ousefleet, Yorkshire, was a Member of Parliament for Yorkshire in 1401.

== Career ==
He was the son and heir of Sir Gerard Usflete (died. c.1363) of North Ferriby. He was knighted before July 1371 and served as Sheriff of Yorkshire 1384-5. He fought in France in the retinue of John of Gaunt, 1st Duke of Lancaster. He died shortly before April 1406 and was buried at North Ferriby.

== Marriage and children ==
By his wife (of unrecorded name) he left legitimate issue one son and two daughters, including:

- Gerard de Usflete (d.1421), eldest son and heir, who took part in the 1405 rebellion of Henry Percy, 1st Earl of Northumberland (d.1408) and fought in the French wars of King Henry V and served as steward of Lincolnshire estates of the Duchy of Lancaster. He married Elizabeth FitzAlan, a daughter of Richard FitzAlan, 11th Earl of Arundel (d.1397) and widow of Thomas de Mowbray, 1st Duke of Norfolk (d.1399). He died without children when his two sisters became his co-heiresses.
- Katherine Usflete (d. after 1436), mother of John Beauchamp, 1st Baron Beauchamp (d.1475) of Powick, KG.
