= Tonbridge Priory =

Augustinian priory in Kent, England

Priory of St. Mary Magdalene, Tonbridge
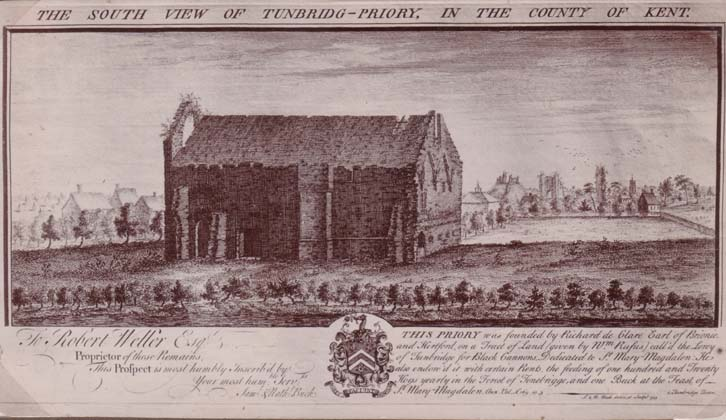
- Remains of the Priory in 1735

- Location within Kent

Monastery information
- Established: 1124
- Disestablished: 1525
- Dedication: St Mary Magdalene
- Diocese: Rochester

People
- Founder: Richard Fitz Gilbert de Clare

Site
- Location: Tonbridge, Kent
- Coordinates: 51°11′33″N 0°16′19″E
- Grid reference: TQ 588 461
- Visible remains: None
- Other information: Site obliterated by the building of Tonbridge railway station and associated infrastructure in 1842.

Tonbridge Priory was a priory in Tonbridge, Kent, England that was established in 1124. It was destroyed by fire in 1337 and then rebuilt. The priory was disestablished in 1523. The building stood in 1735, but was a ruin by 1780. The remains of the priory were demolished in 1842 when the South Eastern Railway built the railway through Tonbridge, the original Tonbridge station standing on its site.

== History ==
Tonbridge Priory was established in 1124 by Richard Fitz Gilbert de Clare, who held Tonbridge Castle. He was buried in the priory following his death in 1136. In 1191, a Papal bull was issued by Pope Celestine III. The priory was granted two cartloads of wood daily and the right of pannage for 80 pigs. A buck was to be provided every year for the Feast of St Mary Magdalene. In 1291, income for the priory amounted to almost £52 from properties located in East Anglia, Kent, Surrey and Sussex. The priory enjoyed these rights until the forest of Tonbridge was forfeited to the Crown. King Richard II ordered that the priory should continue to enjoy the rights, although the right of pannage was reduced to 60 pigs.

The priory was dedicated to St. Mary Magdalene. It was an Augustinian priory which had a range of buildings including a chapter house, church, dormitory, library, refectory and vestry. In 1267, the priory was granted possession of the parish church in Tonbridge. A Christmas feast during the reign of King Edward I consisted of 2 quarters of beef, 3½ casks of beer, 200 loaves of bread, six cockerels, two hams, 100 herrings, two pigs and some wine, at a cost of 16s 9½d.

On 11 July 1337, the priory was destroyed by fire. It was rebuilt with assistance from the Bishop of Rochester and the Archbishop of Canterbury, who granted to the priory the right to take over the revenues of the church and vicarage at Leigh, which was then worth £12 per annum. The income therefrom was for the maintenance of two canons and the rebuilding of the priory, although it was not until 1353 that this was granted. In 1342, Margaret de Clare was buried in the priory. Following his death in 1347, her husband Hugh de Audley was also buried in the priory. In 1348, the Prior of Tonbridge loaned King Edward III £4 to assist him in fighting the French. In 1349, Margaret de Audley, daughter of Hugh de Audley and Margaret de Clare, was buried in the priory. Her husband Ralph de Stafford was buried at the priory in 1372.

In 1353, a mill at Yenesfield was mentioned in an agreement between the Bishop of Rochester and the priory. The priory also owned its own mill, Priory Mill, which stood at TQ 603 455. The income of the priory in 1353 was £99 6s 8d. At that time, the priory received income from the parishes of Brenchley, Leigh, Tudeley and Yalding.

During the reign of King Richard II, the priory was granted a licence in mortmain to hold lands valued at 26s 8d which returned 60s 8d annually. In 1523, the priory was proposed by Cardinal Wolsey to be dissolved as one of 40 priories and monasteries sold to provide funds for the establishment of Christ Church, Oxford. At that time, the priory was assessed as being worth £48 13s 4d. The dissolution happened on 8 February 1525. Wolsey was to provide a free grammar school for 40 pupils in exchange for the closure of the priory. The townsfolk of Tonbridge were against this plan, wanting to retain the priory. At a meeting in Maidstone, held in June 1525, only 16 people attended, of whom 13 were in favour of keeping the priory. The issue was still undecided at Wolsey's death in 1530. The priory then passed to the Crown and was granted to the Dean and Chapter of Windsor. It was not until 1553 that Andrew Judde established Tonbridge Free Grammar School.

The priory building was still intact in 1753, but was a ruin by 1780. In the 1820s, some coffins and skeletons were discovered by men digging for stones from the priory. One of the coffins was placed in the garden of Somerhill House by James Alexander. The coffin is still extant at Somerhill. An iron and brass foundry was later built adjacent to the ruined priory. In 1842, the remains of the priory were demolished when the South Eastern Railway built the railway between Redhill and Tonbridge. In 1934, the building of a new signal box at Tonbridge station resulted in the discovery of more bones from the priory.

== Other burials ==
- William Stafford, 4th Earl of Stafford

== Sources ==
- Reid, Kenneth (1987). Watermills of the London Countryside, their place in English landscape and life. Vol. 1. Cheddar: Charles Skilton Ltd. ISBN 0-284-39165-4.
- Thorpe, John (1769). Registrum Roffensis. J Bayley & W J Richardson.
- Wadmore, James Foster (1882). "Tonbridge Priory". Archaeologia Cantiana. 14. Canterbury: Kent Archaeological Society.
