= Henry Audley =

English baron (d. 1246)

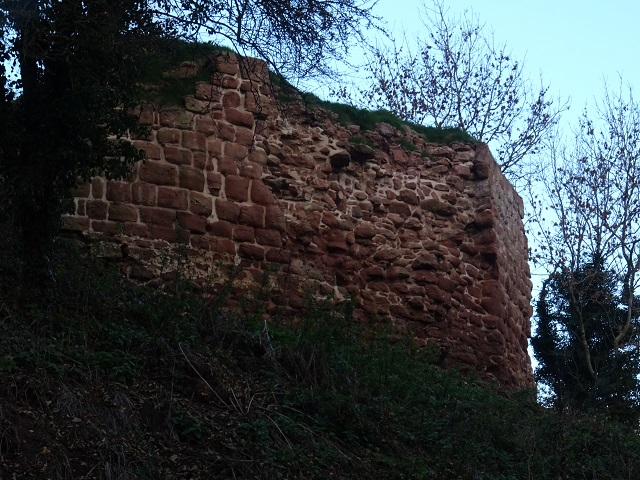
- Part of Heighley Castle
- Born: c. 1175
- Died: before 11 November 1246
- Noble family: de Audley
- Spouse: Bertha de Mesnilwarin
- Issue: James Audley
- Father: Adam de Alditheley
- Mother: Emma, of daughter of Ralph/Radulphus fitzOrm

Henry Audley (or Aldithel or Alditheley; c. 1175–1246) was an English royalist baron and marcher lord. He was made Constable to Hugh de Lacy, 1st Earl of Ulster.

Audley was a royalist baron, born about 1175 to Adam de Alditheley and Emma, daughter of Ralph/Radulphus fitzOrm.

His father Adam held Alditheley (Staffordshire) from the de Verduns of Alton in 1186. He began his career as constable to Hugh de Lacy (whose first wife was a de Verdun) when Earl of Ulster, and, on Hugh's disgrace (1214), attached himself to Ranulph, the great royalist Earl of Chester, and was rewarded by the crown with a forfeited estate (1216). He endowed the nearby Cistercian Abbey of St. Mary at Hulton in 1223, and donated to it a large amount of land, some of which was an inheritance from his mother and some of which was purchased.

Henry married Bertha (or Bertrade or Beatrix), daughter of Ralph de Mesnilwarin (or Mainwaring).

He served as sheriff of Shropshire and Staffordshire 1227 and 1229, as deputy for the Earl of Chester, from whom he obtained large grants of lands. On acquiring Heleigh Castle he made it his chief seat, but was entrusted by the crown, with the constableship of several castles on the Welsh borders from 1223 to his death, which took place shortly before 11 November 1246, when his son Sir James Audley did homage.

His son James became Chief governor of Ireland, and the son-in-law of crusader William Longespée the Younger. James's brother-in-law was Peter de Montfort of Beaudesert Castle, son of royal administrator William I de Cantilupe, and he also served Richard of Cornwall, King of the Romans.
