= Baron Boteler =

Extinct barony in the Peerage of England

Baron Boteler (sometimes modernly Baron Butler or Baron Botiler) was a title that was created three times in the Peerage of England.

The first barony, Baron Boteler, of Warrington, was created by writ on 23 June 1295 for William le Boteler. It became extinct on his death circa 1328.

The second barony, Baron Boteler, of Wem, was created by writ on 19 March 1308 in the Peerage of England for William Boteler, grandson of Gruffydd Maelor II. It fell into abeyance in 1411, on the death of his great-granddaughter.

The third barony, Baron Boteler, of Brantfield in the County of Hertford, was created by letters patent on 30 July 1628 for Sir John Boteler, 1st Baronet, Member of Parliament for Hertfordshire from 1625 to 1626. He had already been created a baronet, of Hatfield Woodhall in the County of Hertford, in the Baronetage of England on 12 April 1620. The titles became extinct on the death of his son, the second Baron, in 1657. George Boteler, half-brother of the first Baron, was created a baronet in 1643 (see Boteler baronets).

== Barons Boteler; First creation (1295) ==
- William Boteler, 1st Baron Boteler of Warrington (died c. 1328)

== Barons Boteler; Second creation (1308) ==
- William Boteler, 1st Baron Boteler of Wem (died 1334)
- William Boteler, 2nd Baron Boteler of Wem (died 1361), married Margaret, daughter of Richard Fitzalan, 1st Earl of Arundel
- William Boteler, 3rd Baron Boteler of Wem (died 1369), married Elizabeth Holand
- Elizabeth Boteler, 4th Baroness Boteler of Wem (died 1411) (abeyant) Her first husband was summoned in 1375 as Sir Robert Ferrers of Wem, which by modern usage would represent a novel peerage, but he was likely summoned as Baron Boteler of Wem, jure uxoris. Their son was Sir Robert Ferrers, who married Countess Joan Beaufort, daughter of Prince John of Gaunt, Duke of Lancaster.

== Barons Boteler; Third creation (1628) ==
- John Boteler, 1st Baron Boteler of Brantfield (died 1637)
- William Boteler, 2nd Baron Boteler of Brantfield (died 1657)
