= Robert de Ferrers, 3rd Baron Ferrers of Chartley =

Robert de Ferrers, 3rd Baron Ferrers of Chartley (Chartley, Staffordshire, 25 March 1309 – 28 August 1350), was the son of John de Ferrers, 1st Baron Ferrers of Chartley and Hawise de Muscegros, a daughter of Robert de Muscegros.

== Career ==
He had inherited the title Baron Ferrers of Chartley from his elder brother John, 2nd Baron, between 1321 and July 1324, and was summoned to parliament on 25 February 1342.

Robert served frequently in the Scottish and French wars of Edward III and participated in the victory at the Battle of Crécy in 1346.

== Marriages and issue ==
Before 20 October 1333, he either married Agnes, daughter of Humphrey de Bohun or a woman named Margaret. They had one son, John, who succeeded his father as John de Ferrers, 4th Baron Ferrers of Chartley.

After the death of Margaret, Robert remarried to Joan de la Mote before 1350. Sources conflict on whether his second son, Sir Robert Ferrers, summoned to parliament as 'Robert Ferrers of Wem' as husband of Elizabeth Boteler, 4th Baroness Boteler of Wem, by whom he had Robert Ferrers of Wem. was by this second wife Joan or by his first wife Agnes.

== Death ==
Robert de Ferrers, 3rd Baron Ferrers of Chartley, died on 28 August 1350.

== See also ==
- Earl of Derby
- Earl of Hereford

Peerage of England
Preceded by John de Ferrers	Baron Ferrers of Chartley c. 1324–1350	Succeeded by John de Ferrers
