= James Audley (died 1272) =

13th century English baron and magnate

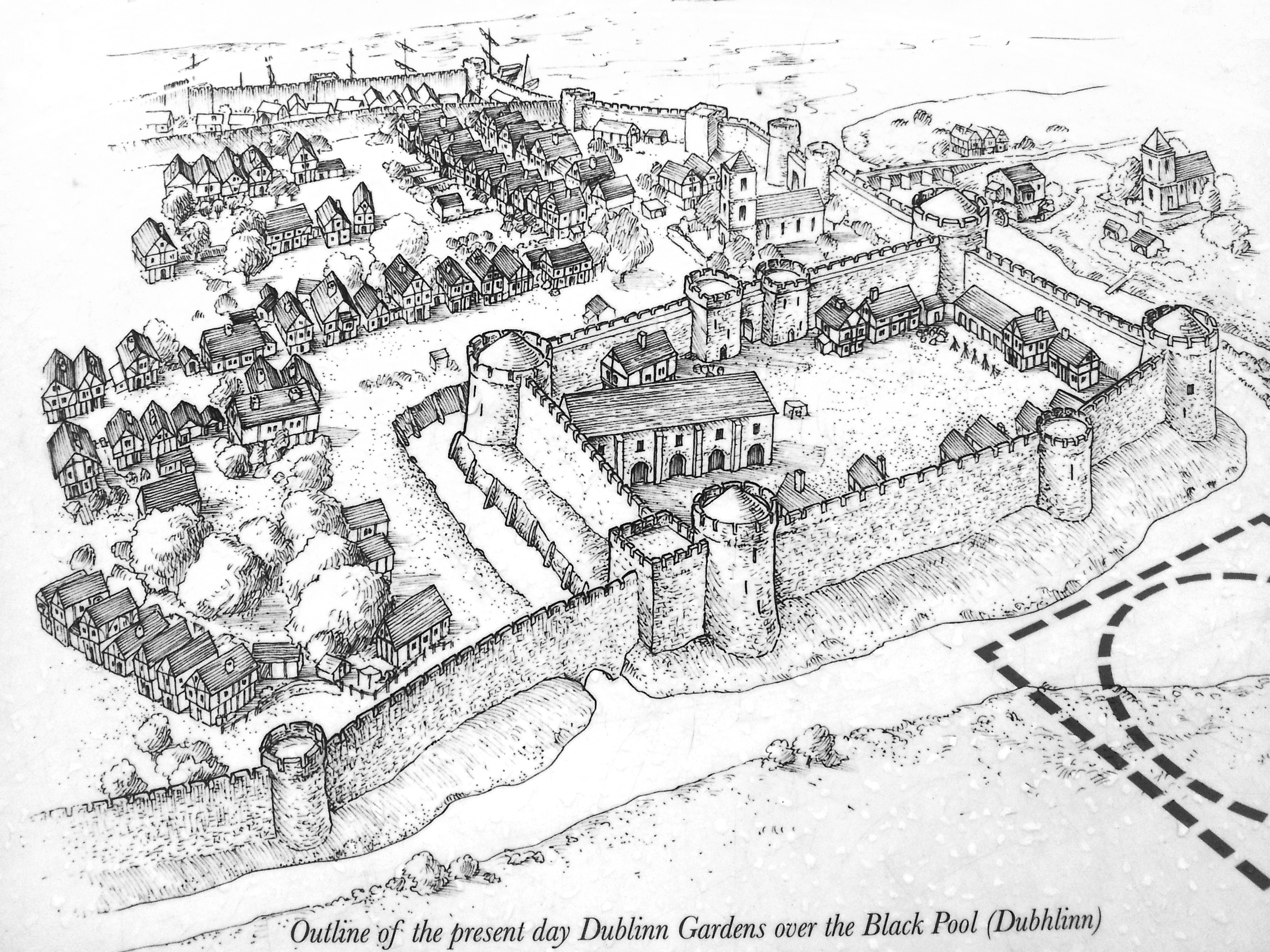
- Dublin Castle, seat of the Chief governor of Ireland
- Born: c. 1220
- Died: June 11, 1272
- Noble family: de Audley
- Spouse: Ela Longespée
- Issue: James de Audley; Hugh de Audley
- Father: Henry Audley
- Mother: Bertha de Mesnilwarin

Sir James Audley (c. 1220–1272), sometimes known as Aldithel or Alditheley, was an English baron and magnate. He became chief governor of Ireland, seated at Dublin Castle, and the son-in-law of crusader William Longespée the Younger.

== Biography ==
James Audley (or de Audley) was born in 1220 to Henry Audley and Bertha de Mesnilwarin, and was, like his father, a marcher lord.

In 1257, he accompanied Richard, king of the Romans, to his coronation at Aachen (Matt. Paris), sailing on 29 April (Rymer) and returning to England in the autumn to take part in the Welsh campaign (1257–1260).

The following year (1258), he was one of the royalist members of the council of fifteen nominated by the Provisions of Oxford, and witnessed, as 'James of Aldithel,' their confirmation by the king (18 October). He also, with his brother-in-law, Peter de Montfort, was appointed commissioner to treat with Llewelyn (18 August), and two years later he acted as an itinerant justice. On Llewelyn of Wales attacking Mortimer, a royalist marcher, Audley joined Prince Edward at Hereford, 9 January 1263 to resist the invasion.

But the barons, coming to Llewelyn's assistance, dispersed the royalist forces, and seized on his castles and estates. He is wrongly said by Dugdale and Foss to have been made 'justice of Ireland' in this year, but in December he was one of the royalist sureties in the appeal to Louis of France.

At the time of the battle of Lewes (May 1264) he was in arms for the king on the Welsh marches (Matthew Paris), and he was one of the first to rise against the government of Simon de Montfort. On Gloucester embracing the royal cause, early in 1265, Audley joined him with the other marchers, and took part in the campaign of Evesham and the overthrow of the baronial party. He appears to have gone on a pilgrimage to Galicia in 1268, and also, it is stated, to Palestine in 1270; but although his name occurs among the 'Crucesignati' of 21 May 1270, it is clear that he never went, for he was appointed justiciary of Ireland a few months later, his name first occurring in connection with that office 5 September 1270. He also served as High Sheriff of Staffordshire and Shropshire in 1261 and 1270.

During his tenure as Justiciar of Ireland he led several expeditions against 'the Irish rebels,' but died by 'breaking his neck' about 11 June 1272 (when he is last mentioned as justiciary), and was succeeded by his son James, who did homage 29 July 1272. His spouse was Ela Longespée, the daughter of William Longespée. Another son of his was Hugh de Audley.

Political offices
Preceded by Robert d'Ufford	Justiciar of Ireland; 1270–1272	Succeeded by Maurice FitzGerald
