= Margaret de Clare =

English noblewoman (1293–1342)

- Countess of Gloucester; Countess of Cornwall
- Born: 12 October 1293; Tonbridge Castle, Kent, Kingdom of England
- Died: 9 April 1342 (aged 48); Chebsey, Staffordshire, Kingdom of England
- Buried: Tonbridge Priory, Kent
- Noble family: de Clare
- Spouses: Piers Gaveston; Hugh de Audley, 1st Earl of Gloucester
- Issue: Joan Gaveston; Margaret de Audley
- Father: Gilbert de Clare, 6th Earl of Hertford
- Mother: Joan of Acre

Margaret de Clare, Countess of Gloucester, Countess of Cornwall (12 October 1293 – 9 April 1342) was an English noblewoman, heiress, and the second eldest of the three daughters of Gilbert de Clare, 6th Earl of Hertford and his wife Joan of Acre, making her a granddaughter of King Edward I of England. Her two husbands were Piers Gaveston and Hugh de Audley, 1st Earl of Gloucester.

== Marriage to Piers Gaveston ==
Margaret was married to Piers Gaveston, the favourite of her uncle Edward II on 1 November 1307. At the time of her marriage, she was 14 years of age. According to the Vita Edwardi Secundi, this marriage was arranged by the King "to strengthen Piers and surround him with friends". Piers Gaveston celebrated the marriage with a lavish tournament at Wallingford Castle. The marriage of such a high-born heiress to a foreigner did not please the English nobility and engendered a great deal of unpopularity. Their daughter, Joan Gaveston, was born on 12 January 1312 in York. It is alleged that they had another child named Amy Gaveston born around 1310, but there is little evidence outside of hearsay to validate this claim. There are also claims that Amy was born to a mistress of Piers Gaveston. However, the evidence is circumstantial and the official records only list Joan Gaveston as born to Piers Gaveston and Margaret de Clare.

King Edward arranged a lavish celebration after the birth of this little girl, complete with minstrels. (Note: Hamilton states "..the king again displayed his generosity..[..]..On that joyous occasion the king paid the remarkable sum of 40 marks to "King Robert" and other minstrels for their performance.") However, Piers Gaveston was executed only six months later, leaving Margaret a widow with a small child. Her dower rights as Countess of Cornwall were disputed, and so King Edward instead assigned her Oakham Castle and other lands. She joined the royal household, and accompanied the King in his journey from London to York in 1316.

== Inheritance and second marriage ==
Following the death of their brother, Gilbert de Clare, 7th Earl of Hertford, at the Battle of Bannockburn in 1314, Margaret and her sisters, Elizabeth and Eleanor de Clare received a share of the inheritance. Margaret was now one of the co-heiresses to the vast Gloucester estate, and King Edward arranged a second marriage for her to another favourite, Hugh de Audley, 1st Earl of Gloucester. She was High Sheriff of Rutland from 1313 to 1319. On 28 April 1317, Margaret de Clare wed Hugh de Audley at Windsor Castle. They had one daughter: Margaret Audley, born between January 1318 and November 1320.

== Despenser War ==
Hugh and Margaret were among the victims of their brother-in-law, Hugh the younger Despenser. In his rashness and greed for the Clare lands, he robbed Margaret of much of her rightful inheritance. In 1321, Hugh de Audley joined the other marcher lords in looting, burning, and causing general devastation to Despenser's lands which subsequently became the Despenser War. Hugh was captured at the Battle of Boroughbridge in 1322, and was saved from a hanging thanks to the pleas of his wife. He was imprisoned, and two months later Margaret was sent to Sempringham Priory in Lincolnshire. She remained there until 1326, when Hugh escaped prison and she was released from Sempringham.

== Countess of Gloucester ==
Hugh and Margaret were reunited sometime in 1326. In summer 1336, their only daughter, Margaret Audley, was abducted by Ralph Stafford, 1st Earl of Stafford. Her parents filed a complaint, but King Edward III supported Stafford. He appeased Hugh and Margaret by creating Hugh Earl of Gloucester. Margaret was henceforth styled Countess of Gloucester.

== Death ==
Margaret died on 9 April 1342, and her sister Lady Elizabeth de Clare paid for prayers to be said for her soul at Tonbridge Priory in Kent, England, where she was buried.

== Ancestry ==
Ancestors of Margaret de Clare

8.Gilbert de Clare, 4th Earl of Hertford
4. Richard de Clare, 5th Earl of Hertford
9. Isabel Marshal
2. Gilbert de Clare, 6th Earl of Hertford
10. John de Lacy, 2nd Earl of Lincoln
5. Maud de Lacy
11. Margaret de Quincy
1. Margaret de Clare
12. Henry III of England
6. Edward I of England
13. Eleanor of Provence
3. Joan of Acre
14. Ferdinand III of Castile
7. Eleanor of Castile
15. Joan, Countess of Ponthieu

== Sources ==
- Hamilton, J.S. (1998). "Another Daughter for Piers Gaveston? Amie de Gaveston, Damsel of the Queen's Chamber". Medieval Prosopography. 19: 177–186.

== Sources ==
- Fine rolls
- Patent roll
