= Robert Farrar (MP) =

English politician

Robert Farrar or Ferrers (by 1528 – 1572/76), was an English politician.

He was a member (MP) of the parliament of England for Lincoln in March 1553, October 1553, April 1554, November 1554, 1555 and 1559 and for Tavistock in 1571 and 1572.
