= Ralph Stafford, 1st Earl of Stafford =

14th-century English nobleman

Ralph, 1st Earl of Stafford KG
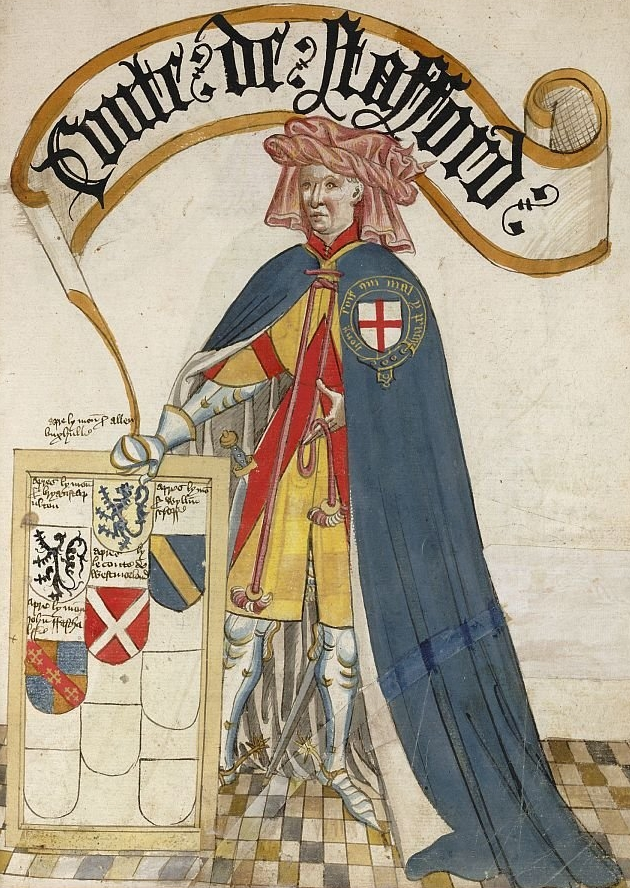
- Ralph de Stafford, 1st Earl of Stafford, KG. Illustration from the Bruges Garter Book, c. 1430. He displays the arms of Stafford on his tunic.

Lord Steward
- In office 1341–1345
- Monarch: Edward III
- Preceded by: John Darcy, 1st Baron Darcy de Knayth
- Succeeded by: Richard Talbot, 2nd Baron Talbot

Personal details
- Born: 24 September 1301
- Died: 31 August 1372 (aged 70)
- Resting place: Tonbridge Priory, Kent
- Spouses: Katherine de Hastang; Margaret de Audley (m. 1336)
- Relations: Stafford family
- Children: Margaret Stafford; Joan Stafford; Ralph de Stafford; Hugh de Stafford, 2nd Earl of Stafford; Katherine Stafford; Elizabeth Stafford; Beatrice Stafford; Joan Stafford
- Parents: Edmund de Stafford, 1st Baron Stafford; Margaret Bassett

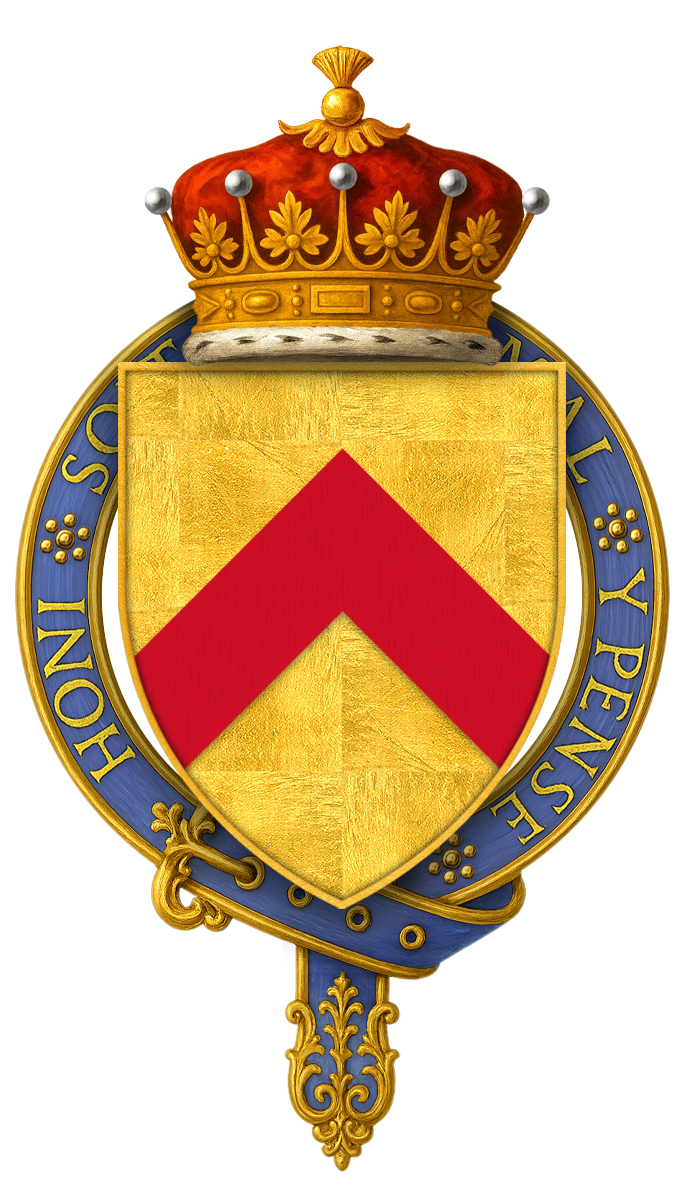
Garter-encircled Arms of Ralph Stafford, 1st Earl of Stafford, KG, viz: "Or a chevron Gules."

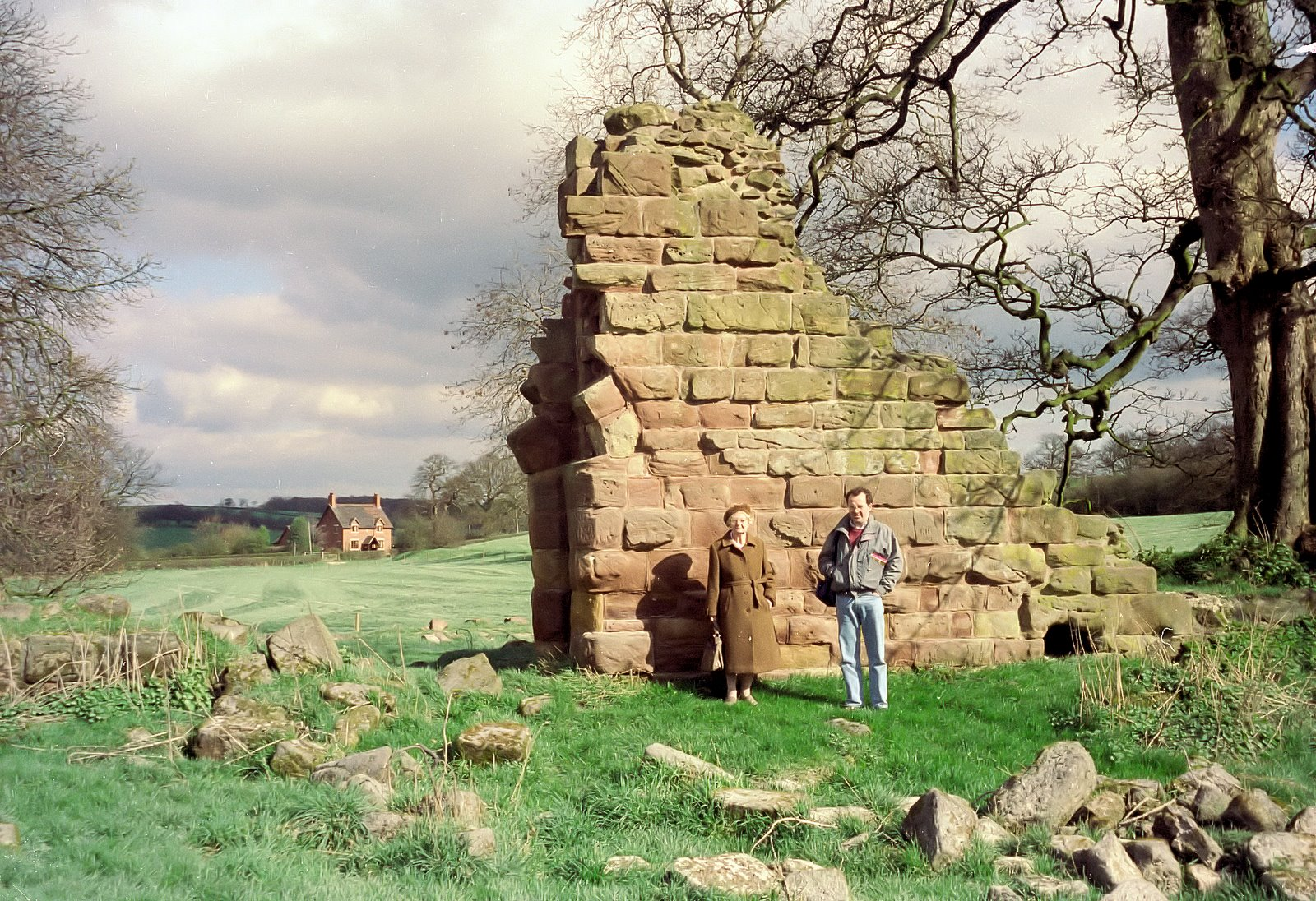
Remains of Madeley Castle in Staffordshire, now known as "Madeley Old Manor", for which the 1st Earl received a licence to crenellate in February 1347/8, together with Stafford Castle, "and to make castles of them". Red Sandstone ashlar blocks with external doorway with portcullis groove and chamfered arch at its north end. This fragment is believed to have formed part of the 1st Earl's castle, namely the west external wall and gateway.

Ralph de Stafford, 1st Earl of Stafford, 2nd Baron Stafford (24 September 1301 – 31 August 1372), KG, of Stafford Castle and Madeley Castle in Staffordshire, was an English nobleman and a notable soldier during the Hundred Years' War against France.

== Early life and family ==
Ralph was born on 24 September 1301, the son of Edmund de Stafford, 1st Baron Stafford and Margaret Basset. Having lost his father at the age of seven, Ralph grew up in the midlands with his mother's relatives, including her second husband Thomas Pipe. He had his first experience of royal service, along with his brothers and stepfather, when he joined the retinue of Ralph, 2nd Lord Basset.

== Career ==
Stafford was made a Knight banneret in 1327 and was fighting the Scots shortly afterwards. He supported the plot to free Edward III of England from the control of Roger Mortimer, which earned the king's gratitude. By the summer of 1332, he was a commissioner of the peace in Staffordshire and had served abroad on royal business, accompanying Hugh de Audley, 1st Earl of Gloucester. He was also still fighting the Scots, commanding archers at the Battle of Dupplin Moor on 11 Aug 1332 and on three further Scottish campaigns.

He was first summoned to Parliament by writ as Lord Stafford on 29 November 1336 and continued to attend until 1350.

His military career continued, accompanying King Edward to France in 1338 as an advisor and being present at the naval battle of Sluys on 24 June 1340. He also fought at the relief of Brest and the siege of Morlaix. He was captured at Vannes but was exchanged in time to negotiate a truce at Malestroit.

On 6 January 1341, he was made Steward of the Royal Household but resigned that post on 29 March 1345 having assumed the office of Seneschal of Aquitaine, an English possession in France, where he stayed for about a year. He took part in the Gascon campaign of 1345 including the battles of Bergerac and Auberoche, the siege of Aiguillon, from where he escaped prior to its lifting, a raid on Barfleur and the English victory at the Battle of Crecy, on 26 August 1346. He became one of the twenty-six founding members and the fifth knight of the Order of the Garter in 1348.

In November 1347, his wife's father died; they were able to take possession of his estates without paying the king's homage, an indication of the relationship between them. Ralph was now a very wealthy man, from his estates and from the many prizes from the French war.

Edward III created a number of new peerage titles to honour his war captains and to mark his jubilee year. Ralph was created the 1st Earl of Stafford on 5 March 1350, with an annuity of 1000 marks. He now replaced Henry of Grosmont, 1st Duke of Lancaster as the king's lieutenant in Gascony. He committed to serve with 200 men at his own expense with the expectation of this being doubled in March 1353 at the king's expense. The campaigns provided several captives that were ransomed, but were ultimately unsuccessful, leading to the appointment of Edward, Prince of Wales to command.

Even at the age of sixty, Stafford continued to command troops and act as a royal envoy, both in France and in Ireland in 1361, accompanying Lionel of Antwerp to try and restore English control.

== Marriages and children ==
Around 1326, Stafford married his first wife, Katherine de Hastang. Katherine was the daughter of Sir John de Hastang, Knight, of Chebsey, Staffordshire. Ralph and Katherine had two daughters:

- Margaret Stafford, married Sir John de Stafford, Knight, of "Broomshull" (Bramshall near Uttoxeter, Staffordshire) and Amblecote in the parish of Old Swinford, Worcestershire, ancestor of several prominent Stafford lines, most notably Stafford of Hooke in Dorset, Stafford of Southwick in Wiltshire and Stafford of Grafton in Worcestershire.
- Joan Stafford, married Sir Nicholas de Beke, Knight.

He later sensationally abducted Margaret de Audley, 2nd Baroness Audley, daughter of Hugh de Audley, 1st Earl of Gloucester and Margaret de Clare, who was worth at least £2,314 a year, more than ten times his own estates. Her parents filed a complaint with King Edward III of England, but the King supported Stafford's actions. In compensation, the King appeased Hugh and Margaret by creating Hugh the 1st Earl of Gloucester. Margaret de Audley and Stafford married before 6 July 1336 and they subsequently had two sons and four daughters:

- Ralph de Stafford (d. 1347), married Maud of Lancaster, daughter of Henry of Grosmont, 1st Duke of Lancaster and Isabel de Beaumont in 1344.
- Hugh de Stafford, 2nd Earl of Stafford, born circa 1336 in Staffordshire, England, married Philippa de Beauchamp; they were the ancestors of the Dukes of Buckingham (1444 creation).
- Elizabeth de Stafford, born circa 1340 in Staffordshire, England, died 7 August 1376, married firstly Fulk le Strange; married secondly, John de Ferrers, 4th Baron Ferrers of Chartley; married thirdly Reginald de Cobham, 4th Baron Cobham.
- Beatrice de Stafford, born circa 1341 in Staffordshire, England, died 1415, married firstly, in 1350, Maurice FitzGerald, 2nd Earl of Desmond (d. June 1358); married secondly, Thomas de Ros, 4th Baron de Ros, of Helmsley; married thirdly Sir Richard Burley, Knt.
- Joan de Stafford, born in 1344 in Staffordshire, England, died 1397, married firstly, John Charleton, 3rd Baron Cherleton; married secondly Gilbert Talbot, 3rd Baron Talbot.
- Katherine de Stafford, born circa 1348 in Staffordshire, England and died in December 1361. On 25 December 1357, she married Sir John Sutton III (1339 – c. 1370 or 1376), Knight, Master of Dudley Castle, Staffordshire. Burke reports that she died without issue. However, Burke is often erroneous and incomplete, and later evidence supports that she is the mother of John Sutton IV, 3rd Baron Sutton of Dudley, probably having died in childbirth.

== Death ==
He died on 31 August 1372 at Tonbridge Castle, Kent, England. He was buried at Tonbridge Priory, next to his second wife and her parents.

Political offices
Preceded by John Darcy, 1st Baron Darcy de Knayth	Lord Steward; 1341–1345	Succeeded by Richard Talbot, 2nd Baron Talbot
Peerage of England
New creation	Earl of Stafford; 1350–1372	Succeeded by Hugh Stafford
Preceded by Edmund de Stafford	Baron Stafford; 1308–1372	Succeeded by Hugh Stafford
