= Edmund de Ferrers, 6th Baron Ferrers of Chartley =

Edmund de Ferrers, 6th Baron Ferrers of Chartley (1386–1435) was the son of Robert de Ferrers, 5th Baron Ferrers of Chartley and Margaret Le Despenser, a daughter of Edward le Despencer, 1st Baron le Despencer.

He inherited the title of Baron Ferrers of Chartley upon his father's death in 1413 but was never summoned to parliament. Edmund fought in many of the great victories of King Henry V including the Battle of Harfleur, the Siege of Rouen (1418-1419), the Siege of Melun, and the Siege of Meaux. He married Helen, daughter and co-heir of Thomas de la Roche, by whom he acquired large landed possessions, including Castle Bromwich in Warwickshire.

The couple had two sons, Edmund (to whom his estates were entailed) and William (who became William, 7th Baron Ferrers of Chartley) as well as one daughter, Margaret de Ferrers, who married John Beauchamp, 1st Baron Beauchamp of Powick becoming Lady Beaucamp of Powick.

Edmund de Ferrers, 6th Baron Ferrers of Chartley, died aged 49 in 1435.

== See also ==
- Earl of Stafford
- Earl of Derby

Peerage of England
Preceded by Robert de Ferrers	Baron Ferrers of Chartley; 1413–1435	Succeeded by William de Ferrers
