= Hugh de Audley, 1st Earl of Gloucester =

English ambassador and sheriff

Hugh de Audley
- 1st Earl of Gloucester
- Arms of Audley: Gules, a fret or
- Other titles: Lord of the Manor of Chilton; Lord of the Manor of Gratton
- Born: c. 1291; Stratton Audley, Oxfordshire, England
- Died: 10 November 1347; Kent, England
- Buried: Tonbridge Priory, Kent, England
- Noble family: de Audley
- Spouse: Margaret de Clare
- Issue: Margaret de Audley
- Father: Hugh de Audley, 1st Baron Audley of Stratton Audley
- Mother: Isolt Mortimer

Hugh de Audley, 1st Earl of Gloucester, 1st Baron Audley (c. 1291 – 10 November 1347) of Stratton Audley in Oxfordshire, and of Gratton in Staffordshire, served as Sheriff of Rutland and was the English Ambassador to France in 1341. He was buried in Tonbridge Priory.

== Origins ==
Hugh was born at Stratton Audley, the second son of Hugh de Audley (c. 1267 – c. 1326) of Stratton Audley by his wife Isolde (Iseult) le Rous (c. 1260 – 1338), daughter of Sir Roger le Rous and Eleanor de Avenbury and the widow of Sir Walter de Balun. The 1st Earl had siblings including John de Audley (born c. 1293) and Alice de Audley (born c. 1304) who married firstly Ralph de Greystoke, 1st Baron Greystoke and later Ralph Neville, 2nd Baron Neville de Raby.

== Marriage ==
Hugh married Margaret de Clare, widow of Piers Gaveston, 1st Earl of Cornwall, who was the favourite (and possibly lover) of King Edward II of England. As Margaret was a sister of Gilbert de Clare, 8th Earl of Gloucester, who was killed at the Battle of Bannockburn in 1314, she brought the Gloucester estates to her husband. By Margaret he had a daughter, Margaret de Audley (born c. 1318 in Stafford), who was abducted as his wife by Ralph Stafford, 1st Earl of Stafford.

== Career ==
Following his marriage, he was created Earl of Gloucester by King Edward III. He served as Sheriff of Rutland from 1316 to 1322 and again from 1327 to 1347.

== See also ==
- Audley-Stanley family

== Sources ==
- Brown, Carleton (1928). "A Thirteenth-Century Manuscript from Llanthony Priory". Speculum. 3 (4 (Oct.)): 587–595.
- Holmes, G.A. (1955). "A Protest against the Despensers, 1326". Speculum. 30 (2 (Apr)): 207–212.
- Ward, Jennifer C. (2013). English Noblewomen in the Later Middle Ages. Routledge.
