= Margaret Audley, 2nd Baroness Audley =

English noblewoman

Margaret de Audley
- 2nd Baroness Audley; Countess of Stafford
- Born: c. 1318
- Died: 7 September 1349
- Buried: Tonbridge Priory
- Spouse: Ralph Stafford, 1st Earl of Stafford
- Issue: Sir Ralph de Stafford; Hugh de Stafford, 2nd Earl of Stafford; Elizabeth de Stafford; Beatrice de Stafford; Joan de Stafford; Katherine de Stafford
- Father: Hugh de Audley, 1st Earl of Gloucester
- Mother: Margaret de Clare

Margaret de Audley, suo jure 2nd Baroness Audley and Countess of Stafford (c. 1318 – 7 September 1349) was an English noblewoman. She was the only daughter of Hugh de Audley, 1st Earl of Gloucester, by his wife Lady Margaret de Clare. Her mother was the daughter of Joan of Acre, Princess of England; thus making Margaret a great-granddaughter of King Edward I by his first consort, Eleanor of Castile. As the only daughter and heiress of her father, she succeeded to the title of 2nd Baroness Audley [E., 1317] on 10 November 1347.

== Marriage and issue ==
Margaret was abducted by Ralph, Lord Stafford, who had helped Edward III take the throne. At the time, her worth was at least £2314 a year, which was more than ten times Stafford's own estates. (However, he eventually rose to Earl of Stafford in 1350.) After the abduction, her parents filed a complaint with the king, but Edward supported Stafford. In compensation, the king appeased Hugh and Margaret by creating Hugh the 1st Earl of Gloucester.

Margaret de Audley and Stafford married before 6 July 1336. They subsequently had two sons and four daughters:

- Sir Ralph de Stafford (d. 1347), married Maud of Lancaster, daughter of Henry of Grosmont, 1st Duke of Lancaster and Isabel of Beaumont in 1344.
- Hugh de Stafford, 2nd Earl of Stafford, born circa 1336 in Staffordshire, England, married Philippa de Beauchamp; they were the ancestors of the Dukes of Buckingham (1444 creation).
- Elizabeth de Stafford, born circa 1340 in Staffordshire, England, died 7 August 1376, married firstly Fulk le Strange; married secondly, John de Ferrers, 4th Baron Ferrers of Chartley; married thirdly Reginald de Cobham, 2nd Baron Cobham.
- Beatrice de Stafford, born circa 1341 in Staffordshire, England, died 1415, married firstly, in 1350, Maurice FitzGerald, 2nd Earl of Desmond (d. June 1358); married secondly, Thomas de Ros, 4th Baron de Ros, of Helmsley; married thirdly Sir Richard Burley, Knt.
- Joan de Stafford, born in 1344 in Staffordshire, England, died 1397, married firstly, John Charleton, 3rd Baron Cherleton; married secondly Gilbert Talbot, 3rd Baron Talbot.
- Katherine de Stafford, born circa 1348 in Staffordshire, England and died in December 1361. Married on 25 December 1357 Sir John de Sutton III (1339 – c. 1370 or 1376), Knight, Master of Dudley Castle, Staffordshire. They were parents of Sir John de Sutton IV, hence grandparents of Sir John de Sutton V.

Peerage of England
Preceded by Hugh de Audley	Baroness Audley; 1347–1349	Succeeded by Hugh de Stafford
