= James Keating (cleric) =

Irish cleric and statesman

Sir James Keating (died c. 1494) was an Irish cleric and statesman of the fifteenth century. He was Prior of the Irish house of the Knights Hospitallers, which was based at Kilmainham, Dublin, and a member of the Privy Council of Ireland.

Despite his political eminence and clerical office, he was a man of ruthless character and violent temper, who once tried to murder a judge, and was later directly responsible for the death of his intended replacement as Prior.

After a long and turbulent career, described by one historian as amounting to "thirty years of outrage, rapine and fraud", he was finally removed from the office of Prior of Kilmainham in 1488 for his treason in supporting the Lambert Simnel Rebellion, and died in poverty a few years later.

== Biography ==
He was born in Bree, County Wexford, to a prominent landowning family who are recorded in County Wexford from about 1250. He was the grandson of Sir Henry Keating, knight. Little is known of his early life. He joined the Order of Knights Hospitallers, of which his family had been generous benefactors, rose rapidly through its ranks and in 1461 became Prior of the Order's Irish house at Kilmainham, in succession to Sir Thomas Talbot, having taken the trouble of travelling to Rhodes in 1459 to canvass support for his appointment from his superiors.

=== Attempted murder of Sir Robert Dowdall ===
Soon after his appointment as Prior, he committed a crime which might well have ended his career, and even his life. At Pentecost 1462 Sir Robert Dowdall, the Chief Justice of the Irish Common Pleas, went on a pilgrimage to the "holy well" at Clonliffe, in north Dublin. Keating attacked him with a sword, seemingly with every intention of killing him. The motive for the attack is unknown, although crimes of violence, even among the ruling class, were not uncommon in that era. Twenty years earlier another Irish judge, James Cornwalsh, Chief Baron of the Irish Exchequer, had been murdered in the course of a private war over possession of a castle: his killers were later pardoned for the crime. Likewise, when Patrick Segrave was murdered by Patrick White and others in 1455, all the killers were pardoned.

Keating was not, it should be said, the first Prior of Kilmainham to have a reputation for lawlessness: Thomas FitzGerald (reputedly an illegitimate member of the great FitzGerald dynasty), who was removed from office as Prior in 1447, was a notably turbulent and litigious individual, who clashed with James Butler, 4th Earl of Ormonde and with Sir William Welles, the Lord Chancellor of Ireland, whom he was accused of kidnapping. Prior Richard de Wirkeley, in the previous century, was another violent and controversial character who headed the Kilmainham house.

Keating was arrested and arraigned for trial before the Irish Parliament on a number of charges, including attempted murder, but the charges were dropped on condition that he pay Dowdall 100 marks in damages (although it seems that he never did so). He probably owed his immunity from punishment to the influence of the powerful Anglo-Irish magnate Thomas FitzGerald, 7th Earl of Kildare, later Lord Chancellor of Ireland, who acted as Keating's patron.

=== Prior of Kilmainham ===
For the next few years, he seems to have run the Order House smoothly enough. He was later accused of bankrupting it: in his defence, he pointed out that in 1467 his superiors in Rhodes had increased the annual payment due to the Order's central fund from the Kilmainham house from £40 to £70 without consulting him. At a Chapter meeting of the Order in Rome, he pleaded without success for a reduction of the annual payment. He argued that the increase took no account of the Irish House's ability to pay, and insisted that he had been simply unable to find the extra money.

The charge of fraud made against him by later historians seems to be based on his general bad character, rather than on any specific crime. He succeeded in having some of the property alienated by his two predecessors restored.

== Politics ==
As Prior of Kilmainham, he was entitled to sit in the Parliament of Ireland and on the Irish Privy Council, and thus he was able to play a key role in Irish politics. During the Wars of the Roses, the dynastic struggle between the rival branches of the Plantagenet dynasty, Keating in common with almost all the Anglo-Irish nobility favoured the House of York over the rival House of Lancaster. The victory of York over Lancaster, in the year Keating became Prior, increased his political standing. However, he was in temporary disgrace in 1467, when King Edward IV sent the notoriously ruthless John Tiptoft, 1st Earl of Worcester (nicknamed "The Butcher of England") to be Lord Lieutenant of Ireland. Worcester held a Parliament at Drogheda where he proceeded to deal mercilessly with his enemies, including the Earl of Kildare, who fled abroad, and Keating, who was briefly imprisoned and subjected to a heavy fine.

=== Lord Grey as Lord Lieutenant of Ireland ===
His fortunes improved greatly after the House of Lancaster, which had briefly regained the throne in 1470–1, was finally crushed at the Battle of Tewkesbury in May 1471. Among the defeated Lancastrians who were executed for treason after Tewkesbury was Sir John Langstrother, Prior of the English Hospitallers. Keating by contrast was commended by the victorious Yorkists for his loyalty to their cause. The Lancastrians during their brief restoration had also indirectly strengthened his political position by executing his enemy, Worcester, who was a committed Yorkist and perhaps the most hated man in England.

Though not a founder member, Keating was later elected one of the knights of the Brotherhood of Saint George, the short-lived military order set up in 1470 for the defence of the Pale. In 1471 the Irish Parliament gave him leave to go abroad for two years, for what purpose is unclear. In 1474 he was a party to the charter establishing the Dublin Smith's Guild, one of the earliest of the Guilds of the City of Dublin, and ranked third in precedence. Ironically his lifelong enemy Sir Robert Dowdall was another of the founders.

In 1478 he clashed again with the English Crown when King Edward IV, in an effort to strengthen his control of Ireland, sent Lord Grey of Codnor to Ireland as Lord Lieutenant. The Anglo-Irish nobles, led by the immensely powerful Gerald FitzGerald, 8th Earl of Kildare and his father-in-law Baron Portlester, simply refused to recognize his authority: Keating, who had assumed the role of Constable of Dublin Castle, apparently without any legal right to it (Richard Archbold was later described as the "rightful Constable" and had letters patent to prove his appointment) played a key role in these events by refusing Lord Grey entry to the Castle. After a few months of political deadlock, the King yielded and Grey returned to England, leaving Keating and his allies triumphant. He was allowed to retain the office of Constable of Dublin Castle, despite the rival claim of Richard Archbold, on condition that he repair the drawbridge, which he had destroyed to impede Grey's entry.

== Imprisonment of Marmaduke Lumley ==
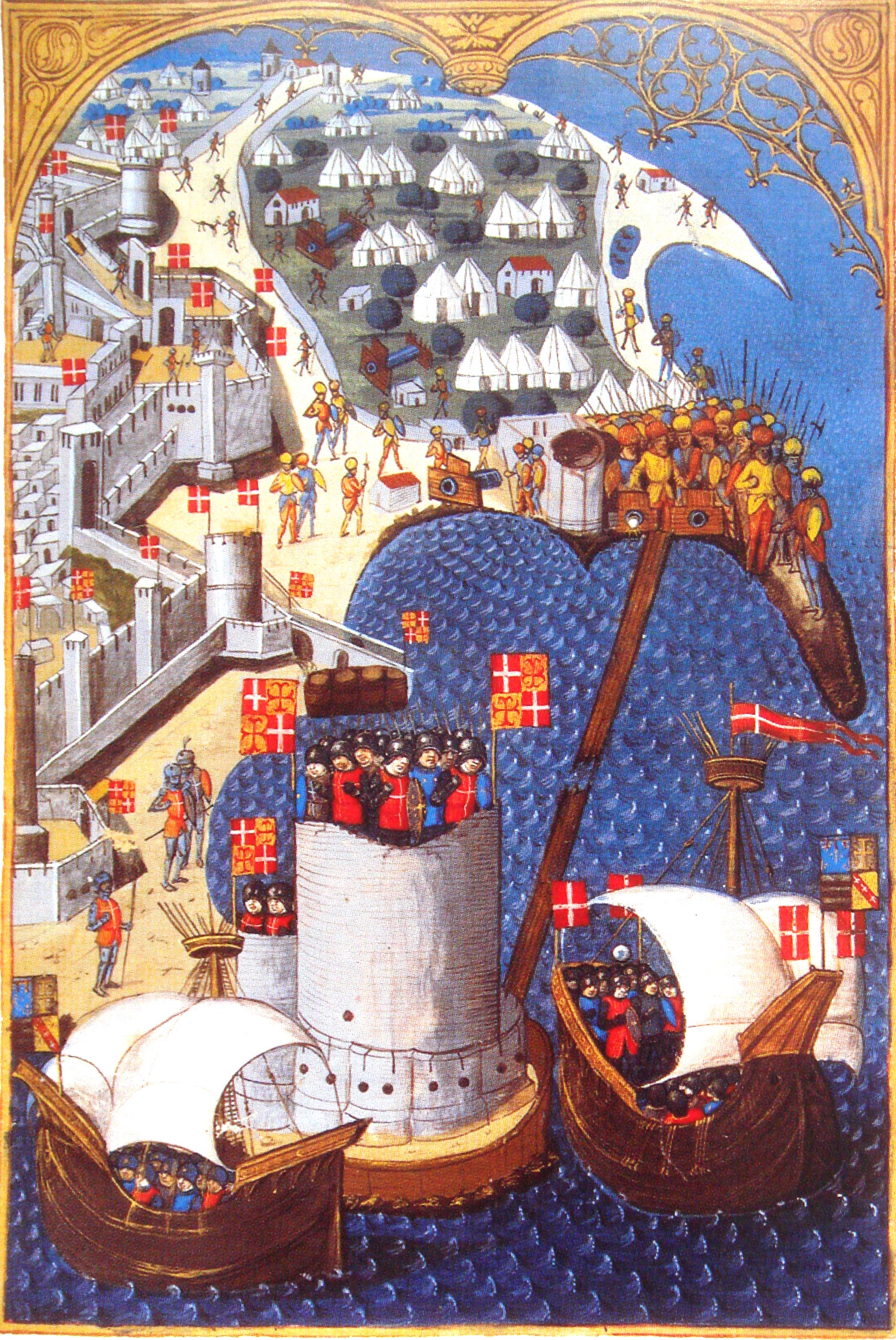
Siege of Rhodes 1480

The next threat to his position as Prior came from his own superiors in Rhodes, who were outraged by his failure to give any assistance to the beleaguered Order against the Ottoman Empire during the Siege of Rhodes in 1480. In 1482 he was removed from office on the orders of the Grand Master, Pierre d'Aubusson, for numerous acts of "disobedience and maladministration", and replaced by an English member of the Order, Marmaduke Lumley, who obtained Papal approval for his election. Keating, however, was not a man to submit meekly to being deposed, and when Lumley landed at Clontarf, Dublin, Keating led a large force which captured and imprisoned him, and later put him in chains. Both the Papal Legate, Octavian De Spinellis, and the Archbishop of Dublin, John Walton, expressed their outrage at Keating's conduct and demanded Lumley's release. In 1484 they sent a troop of soldiers to free him, but Keating, who was himself a trained soldier (like all his Order), defeated the episcopal army. Lumley died in prison soon after. Keating was excommunicated for his actions, but true to his stubborn and unyielding character, simply ignored the excommunication, and continued to act as Prior.

== Lambert Simnel ==
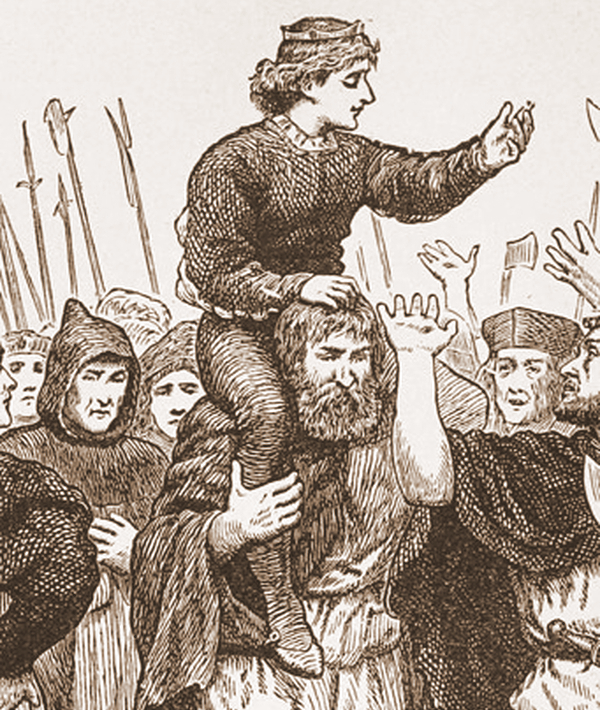
Lambert Simnel in Ireland

Keating ultimately fell into disgrace as a result of the change of dynasty in England. The downfall of the House of York at the Battle of Bosworth in 1485, and the establishment of the Tudor dynasty under King Henry VII came as unwelcome news to the largely pro-Yorkist Anglo-Irish nobility. Led by the Earl of Kildare and Lord Portlester, they refused to accept the legitimacy of the new dynasty, and their resistance to Henry led to Keating's ruin. In 1487 Kildare, Portlester, Keating and their allies made the mistake of supporting the claims of the pretender Lambert Simnel, who claimed to be Edward Plantagenet, 17th Earl of Warwick, the rightful heir of the House of York. Simnel, whose true origins are something of a mystery, was an imposter, but is known to have borne a striking resemblance to the real Warwick, who was a prisoner in the Tower of London, where he remained until his execution in 1499. Simnel was proclaimed King Edward VI and crowned in Dublin. He invaded England with a large army, only to be crushed at the Battle of Stoke Field.

== Keating's ruin and last years ==
Henry VII was remarkably merciful in victory: Simnel himself became a servant in the Royal Household, and almost all of the Anglo-Irish nobility received a royal pardon. The notable exception was Keating, whose record of violence, and defiance both of the Crown and his own superiors made it impossible for the King to trust him. He had unwisely incurred the enmity of Ottaviano de Spinellis, who was now Archbishop of Armagh, over the Lumley affair, and the Archbishop no doubt opposed a pardon for Keating. Sir Richard Edgcumbe, the Crown official sent to Ireland to accept the submission of the Anglo-Irish nobility, chose to regard Keating and Sir Thomas Plunket, the Chief Justice of the Irish Common Pleas, (who however was eventually pardoned) as the "prime instigators" of the rebellion, although most historians attach more importance to the roles of the Earl of Kildare and his father-in-law Lord Portlester. Despite repeated pleas to Edgcumbe on Keating's behalf, to which Edgcumbe responded with "right sharp words", he was refused a pardon and deprived of the office of Prior once more; he was also deprived of his office as Constable of Dublin Castle, which was restored to Richard Archbold, who had been unlawfully excluded from it for several years. Further a rule was laid down that in future the Prior must always be an Englishman. Showing all his old stubbornness, Keating refused to leave Kilmainham, but was finally ejected in 1491. His last act as Prior was to secure the appointment of his own candidate, James de Valle or Wall, as his successor. He died in poverty, probably in 1494.

== Sources ==
- Ball, F. Elrington The Judges in Ireland 1221-1921 London John Murray 1926
- Brenan, M. J. Ecclesiastical History of Ireland Dublin John Coyne 1840
- Chrimes, S. B. Henry VII Yale University Press 1999
- Keating, J. Percy John Keating and his forebears Records of the American Catholic Historical Society Vol. XXIX (1918)
- Moore, Thomas The History of Ireland Vol.3 London Longman Green 1846
- Otway-Ruthven, A. J. History of Medieval Ireland New York Barnes and Noble reissue 1993
- Ross, Charles Edward IV Eyre Methuen Ltd. 1994
- Weir, Alison York and Lancaster-the Wars of the Roses Arrow Books 1996
- Wright, G.N. Historical Guide to the City of Dublin London Baldwin Cradock and Joy 1825
