= Katherine Stourton, Baroness Grey of Codnor =

English noblewoman

Katherine Stourton, Baroness Grey of Codnor (c. 1455 – 1521) was an English noblewoman. Her life reflects the turbulence of English political life in the late fifteenth and early sixteenth centuries; her first husband was attainted for treason, and her third husband holds the record for the longest period of imprisonment in the Tower of London.

== Background ==
She was the daughter of William Stourton, 2nd Baron Stourton and Margaret Chideock, eldest daughter of Sir John Chideock and Catherine Lumley. Her father, although he was not a leading political figure, enjoyed the confidence of King Edward IV: in 1469 he sat on the commission of oyer and terminer which convicted Thomas Hungerford of Rowden and Henry Courtenay of treason.

== First marriage ==
About 1475, Katherine married Sir William Berkeley, son of Sir Maurice Berkeley of Beverstone Castle, Gloucestershire and his wife Anne West. At about the same time, her brother John married William's sister, another Katherine. William became a political figure of some importance at the court of Edward IV; he was constable of Southampton and Winchester, organised the entertainment of the King's sister Margaret, Duchess of Burgundy on her visit to England in 1480, and played a leading role in organising Edward IV's funeral.

Ross suggests that it was loyalty to Edward's children that led Berkeley, like several other key members of the royal household, to oppose Richard III when he seized the throne. He was one of the leaders of Buckingham's revolt in October 1483. After the failure of the revolt, Berkeley, unlike many of the rebels, did not immediately flee the country, having apparently some hope of a pardon. The Parliament of 1484 attainted him as a traitor, but in March he was pardoned. Katherine's brother John stood surety for his good behaviour. Soon afterwards he abandoned the Yorkist cause for good and joined the future Henry VII in Brittany. After Henry's victory at the Battle of Bosworth the Berkeley lands were restored, and several court offices were promised to William. By this time, however, he was already a sick man (having made a codicil to his will in September 1485) and seems to have died early in 1486. He and Katherine had no children.

== Second marriage ==
Before 1492, Katherine married Henry Grey, 4th (7th) Baron Grey of Codnor, becoming his third wife. Henry, who was at least twenty years older than Katherine, was one of the principal magnates in Derby. Despite a record of fomenting riot, which brought him before the Star Chamber on at least one occasion, he enjoyed the trust of successive Kings, and was Lord Deputy of Ireland in 1478–79. Although the marriage was childless, it seems to have been a happy one, and upon his death in 1496, Grey provided generously for Katherine in his will.

== Third marriage ==
Within a year of Grey's death, Katherine made a third and illustrious marriage into the House of York itself; her husband was William de la Pole, a younger son of John de la Pole, 2nd Duke of Suffolk, and Elizabeth, sister of Edward IV. Since William was more than 20 years younger than Katherine his motives for marrying were presumably financial, although the families had long been close, and William's sister married Katherine's brother William Stourton, 5th Baron Stourton.

Within a few years, with the House of York almost extinct and the Tudor dynasty on the throne, Katherine and William faced an uncertain future. Henry VII, the first Tudor king, did not have his son's ruthless determination to eliminate all the surviving Yorkist claimants, but he was deeply suspicious of the de la Poles, and with some reason; William's eldest brother, John had been killed at the Battle of Stoke Field, fighting against Henry for the pretender Lambert Simnel, who claimed to be the rightful Yorkist heir.

In 1501, two of William's brothers Edmund and Richard de la Pole fled the country, after being accused, probably with good cause, of conspiracy. The fact that William did not flee with them might be seen as evidence of his innocence, but Henry was clearly taking no chances; William was arrested and spent the rest of his life in the Tower of London, dying there in 1539. Katherine died in London in November 1521.
