= Barnaby Barnewall =

Irish barrister and judge

Barnaby Barnewall (died 1493) was an Irish barrister and judge, and a founder member of the military guild, the Brotherhood of Saint George.

He was born at Crickstown, County Meath, to the leading Anglo-Irish family of Barnewall; Robert Barnewall, a close relative, was created the first Baron Trimleston in 1461. Barnaby is sometimes described as a brother of Sir Christopher Bernevall, Lord Chief Justice of Ireland, but the great difference in their ages (Christopher was born about 1370) makes it more likely that Barnaby was his nephew.

He was "bred to the law": at that time two families, Barnewall and Plunket, dominated the Irish judiciary to a remarkable degree. He was studying law in London in 1460, and the following year was made a judge of the Court of King's Bench (Ireland). He was charged with raising troops in County Meath in 1463, and in 1473 was appointed Collector of Revenues for Dublin and Drogheda. He was one of the original members of the Brotherhood of Saint George, a military order set up in 1474 for the defence of the Pale, which was for a time the only standing army in Ireland. It seems to have achieved little and was suppressed in 1494, a year after his death.

In 1468 he founded a chantry at Dunshaughlin, jointly with the Lord Deputy of Ireland, John Tiptoft, 1st Earl of Worcester.

In 1487, in common with all of his judicial colleagues, he made the mistake of supporting the claim of Lambert Simnel, pretender to the English Crown. Simnel's cause was crushed at the Battle of Stoke Field: the victorious King Henry VII was merciful to the rebels and Barnewall, together with his colleagues, was pardoned in 1488.

He resided at Stackallen, near Slane. He died in 1493: his epitaph in the parish church at Stackallen was still visible in 1830. He married Margaret, daughter of Sir Thomas Fitz-Christopher Plunket, who presided in the King's Bench during Barnaby's early years on the Court; they had no children.
