= John Walton (bishop) =

English Augustinian, archbishop of Dublin

- Church: Roman Catholic
- Archdiocese: Dublin

John Walton (died c. 1490) was an English canon regular who became Archbishop of Dublin.

== Life ==
Little is known of his early life. In 1452 Walton was made Abbot of Osney, and in 1472 was elected as Archbishop of Dublin, and consecrated in England. In 1478 he managed, through the Irish Parliament, to obtain the restitution of some manors alienated by his predecessors. During his tenure Pope Sixtus IV authorized the re-establishment of the unsuccessful University of Dublin, but the plan was never carried out.

Walton kept out of politics, and was apparently rather easily bullied. He was overshadowed by his suffragan, the quarrelsome and unpopular William Sherwood, Bishop of Meath. In 1474 he failed to impose his will on the Dean and Chapter of St Patrick's Cathedral, Dublin, and was reprimanded by Edward IV for making the attempt. He was completely unable to control Sir James Keating, the violent and turbulent Prior of the Order of Knights Hospitallers at Kilmainham. When he was replaced as Prior by the English monk Marmaduke Lumley in 1482, Keating had Lumley seized and imprisoned. Despite repeated orders from both Walton and Octavian De Spinellis, the Archbishop of Armagh, Keating refused to release Lumley, who died in prison. Keating himself was eventually removed from office in 1490 for his treason in supporting the claim of the pretender Lambert Simnel, and died soon after.

In 1484, blind and in bad health, he resigned the archbishopric. He retired to his manor of Swords, County Dublin. On 17 March 1489, he emerged to preach a sermon for the Feast day of St. Patrick before the Lord Deputy at his former cathedral. He died soon afterwards, leaving bequests to Osney Abbey, where he had hoped to be buried, were his death to have occurred in England.

Catholic Church titles
Preceded by Michael Tregury	Archbishop of Dublin; 1472–1483	Succeeded by Walter Fitzsimon

== Notes ==
Attribution

This article incorporates text from a publication now in the public domain: Lee, Sidney, ed. (1899). "Walton, John (d.1490?)". Dictionary of National Biography. Vol. 59. London: Smith, Elder & Co.
