= Octavian De Spinellis =

Octavian De Spinellis or Ottaviano de Palatio (died June 1513) was Archbishop of Armagh from 1478 until 1513.

== Biography ==
Spinellis was born in Italy, probably in Lombardy. He is said to have been attached to the Curia, and his residence in the Apostolic Palace in the Vatican City may have given rise to his alternative surname De Palatio (later Anglicised to Palles).

He was sent to Ireland as Papal Nuncio in 1477 to investigate the disastrous financial condition of the See of Armagh. The then Archbishop, Edmund Connesburgh, was not personally responsible for the enormous debts of the Archdiocese, which had been incurred by his predecessor John Bole, who died in 1471. Still. he had been unable to remedy the situation. Despite having been the personal choice of King Edward IV for Archbishop, Connesburgh was persuaded to resign in return for a pension and the cancellation of his debts. In the circumstances, the choice of Spinellis, whom the Pope had always preferred to Connesburgh, to replace him, was obvious. The new archbishop disliked Ulster and preferred to live in Dublin or the counties of The Pale adjoining it.

As Archbishop, he had to adjudicate in a dispute within the Diocese of Kilmore. When he held his first Provincial Council at Drogheda in July 1480, an objection was raised to the appointment of Cormac Mág Shamhradháin because he was illegitimate. This appointment was revoked on 20 October 1480 and Tomás Mac Brádaigh, the Archdeacon of Kilmore, recommended replacing him: his decision was confirmed by Pope Sixtus IV.

Later in the decade, the Archbishop clashed bitterly with the Bishop of Meath, John Payne. Payne had been deeply involved in the attempt to put the pretender Lambert Simnel on the English throne, and had preached the sermon at Simnel's so-called coronation in Dublin. Simnel's cause was crushed at the Battle of Stoke Field in June 1487. Payne, like nearly all of Simnel's supporters, received a royal pardon from the victorious Henry VII, but apparently felt that he could improve his standing at Court by attacking Spinellis, with whom his relations were never good. His claims that Spinellis was sympathetic to Simnel's cause were not taken seriously: as a foreigner whose residence in the British Isles was a matter of chance, there was no reason for Spinellis to involve himself in English dynastic struggles. Nonetheless, after the failure of Simnel's case, as a precaution, he was required to swear the usual oath of fealty to the new regime.

Simnel's cause ruined another turbulent Irish cleric with whom Spinellis had quarrelled, James Keating, Prior of the Irish House of the Knights Hospitallers at Kilmainham. Keating had been removed by the mother House as Prior and replaced by Marmaduke Lumley: but he refused to vacate his office, and threw Lumley into prison, where he died. Spinellis and his fellow Archbishop, John Walton of Dublin, made vigorous efforts to free him, even hiring troops, but to no effect. No doubt Spinellis was among those who opposed pardoning Keating for his active role in the Simnel Rebellion. Keating was expelled from the Order House at Kilmainham and died in poverty a few years later.

Spinellis died in office in 1513. He was described as "a man of considerable wisdom and learning". Several of his relatives had accompanied him to Ireland, and settled there. They used the alternative surname De Palatio, which was Anglicised to Palles, and became prosperous landowners in County Cavan. They remained loyal to the Roman Catholic faith, even at the height of the Penal Laws. The most distinguished of the family was Christopher Palles (1831-1920), Chief Baron of the Irish Exchequer, who is still often called "the greatest of the Irish judges".
