= Brotherhood of Saint George =

15th-century military guild in Ireland

The Brotherhood of Saint George was a short-lived military guild, which was founded in Dublin in 1474 for the defence of the English-held territory of the Pale. For a short time, it was the only standing army maintained by the English Crown in Ireland. It was suppressed by King Henry VII in 1494, due to his suspicions about the Brotherhood's loyalty to his dynasty. It was not an order of knighthood, although some of its individual members were knights.

== History of the Pale ==
Following the Norman Invasion of Ireland, which began in 1169, the English Crown gradually extended its control over four-fifths of Ireland; but from the early fourteenth century onwards, the Crown's influence steadily diminished and its Irish territories shrank. By the middle of the fifteenth century, the only region of Ireland under secure English control was a part of Counties Dublin, Kildare, Meath and Louth. These lands were partially guarded by a fortified ditch or "Pale" (from the Latin palus), which gave its name to the territory itself. The citizens of the Pale were constantly troubled by raids by neighbouring Irish clans (particularly the O'Byrnes and O'Tooles of County Wicklow), although the danger from the clans greatly diminished after 1401, when the Dubliners crushingly defeated the O'Byrne clan of County Wicklow at the Battle of Bloody Bank, by the River Dargle. Despite this victory, defence of the Pale remained a permanent preoccupation of the Dublin Government.

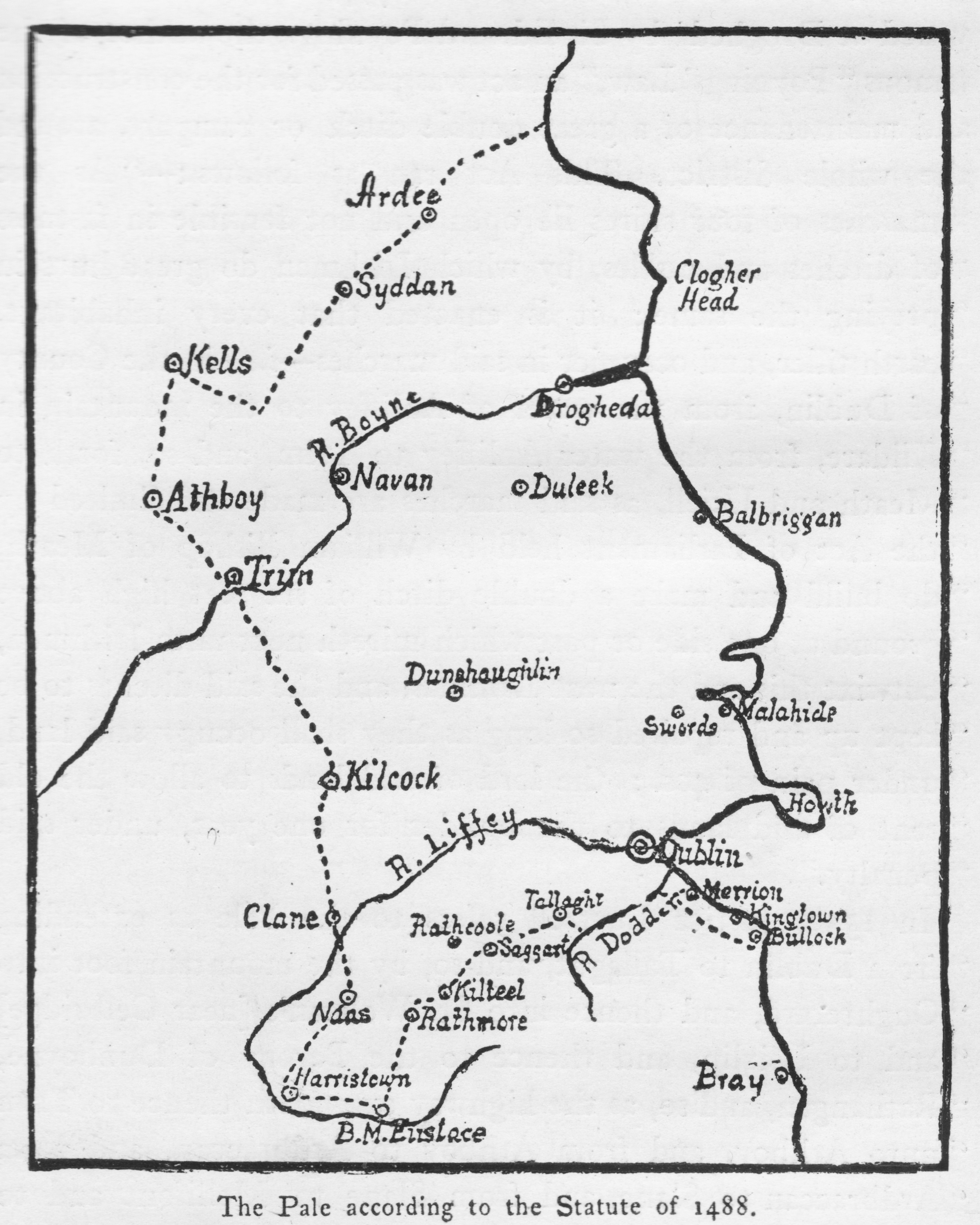
The Pale 1488

== Foundation of the Brotherhood ==
In 1474 the Irish Parliament, apparently at the instigation of Thomas, 7th Earl of Kildare, the Lord Deputy of Ireland, chose thirteen men "of the most noble and worthy in the four shires" as the members, or companions of the Brotherhood. They were ordered to assemble in Dublin every year on St George's Day to express their loyalty to the Crown.

== Role of the Brotherhood ==
The members of the Brotherhood were entrusted with the defence of the Pale, and were assigned 120 archers, 40 other cavalry and 40 pages for that purpose. They had the right to levy customs duties on all merchandise sold in Ireland outside Dublin and Drogheda: this seems to have been an early form of the cess, the tax for military garrisons for the defence of the Pale, which caused much ill feeling and political controversy among the landowners of the Pale in the next century. They also had the right to arrest malefactors, rebels and outlaws. The captain was to be chosen annually: the 7th Earl of Kildare was the first captain. It has been said that the Brotherhood, with its 200 men, constituted for a time the "entire English standing army in Ireland".

The choice of Saint George as the patron saint of the order suggests some degree of personal involvement in the foundation of the Brotherhood by King Edward IV, who had a keen interest in the cult of that particular saint.

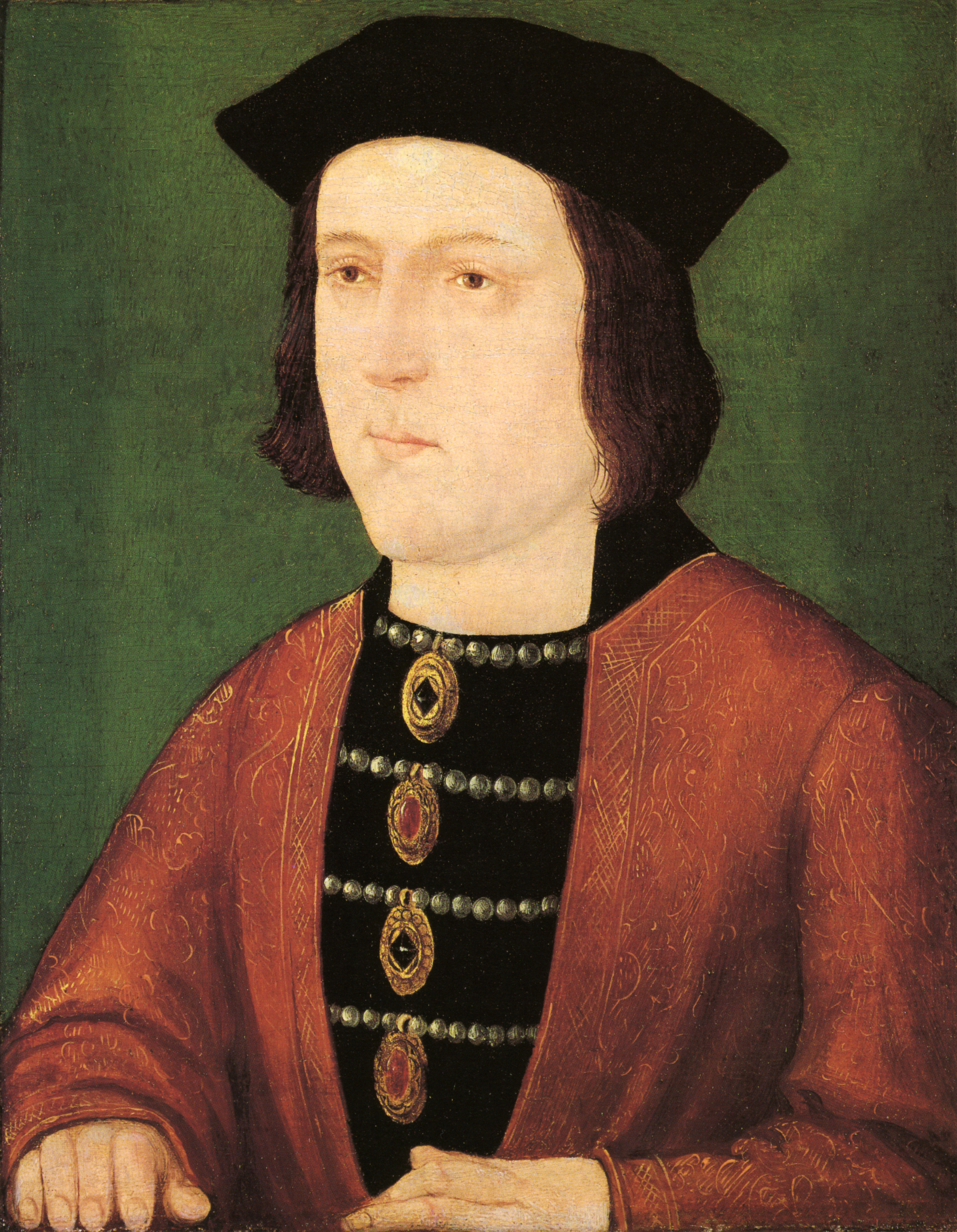
King Edward IV, patron of the Brotherhood of Saint George

== The Companions of Saint George ==
List of the original Companions of Saint George:

- Thomas FitzGerald, 7th Earl of Kildare,
- Robert St Lawrence, 3rd Baron Howth
- Sir Robert Dowdall, Chief Justice of the Irish Common Pleas
- Barnaby Barnewall of Crickstown, judge of the Court of King's Bench (Ireland)
- Rowland FitzEustace, 1st Baron Portlester
- John Plunkett, 3rd Baron of Dunsany
- Alexander Plunket, Lord Chancellor of Ireland
- Sir Robert FitzEustace, High Sheriff of Kildare
- Sir Lawrence Taaffe, Mayor of Drogheda
- Richard Bellew of Bellewstown
- Robert Preston, 1st Viscount Gormanston
- Edward Plunkett, Seneschal of Meath
- the Mayor of Dublin: presumably this was either John Bellew (Mayor 1473/4) or Nicholas Burke (Mayor 1474/5).

=== Social Background of the Companions ===
All of the original Companions belonged to the landowning class. Five of them were members of the Irish peerage, two held elective office, and three were judges. The position of Lord Chancellor of Ireland did not necessarily require professional training as a lawyer, but two other members of the Brotherhood held judicial offices which required the holder to be a qualified lawyer.

James Keating, Prior of Kilmainham, though not listed as one of the founding members, is said to have joined the Brotherhood at a later date: as his monastic order, the Knights Hospitallers, were "fighting monks", he was a logical choice to serve as a member.

== History of the Brotherhood ==
During its 20-year history, surprisingly little is recorded about the Brotherhood. William Sherwood, Bishop of Meath, during his brief and unpopular tenure as Lord Deputy of Ireland (1475–77), abolished the Brotherhood, but it was reconstituted in 1479. The 7th Earl of Kildare, who seems to have been the driving force behind it, had died in 1477 and several of the original brethren were dead by 1487 (although the order did have the right to fill vacancies in its membership, and as noted Prior Keating was chosen to fill one vacancy, while the 3rd Baron was replaced by his eldest son and heir).

=== Suppression of the Order ===
After the downfall of the House of York in 1485, the Anglo-Irish nobility, whose leaders made up the knights of the Brotherhood, remained strongly Yorkist in sympathy. Apart from Nicholas, 4th Baron Howth, son and heir of one of the original Companions, who had a connection by marriage to the new Tudor dynasty, almost all of the noblemen who were associated with the Brotherhood supported the claims of the Yorkist pretender Lambert Simnel to the English Crown, and some of them followed him to his crushing defeat by Henry VII at the Battle of Stoke in 1487. Although the victorious King Henry showed a remarkable degree of clemency towards the defeated rebels, and indeed towards Simnel himself (he became a servant in the royal household), this evidence of disloyalty to his dynasty may well explain the decision of Henry VII, who was not a trustful man by nature, to dissolve the Brotherhood in 1494.

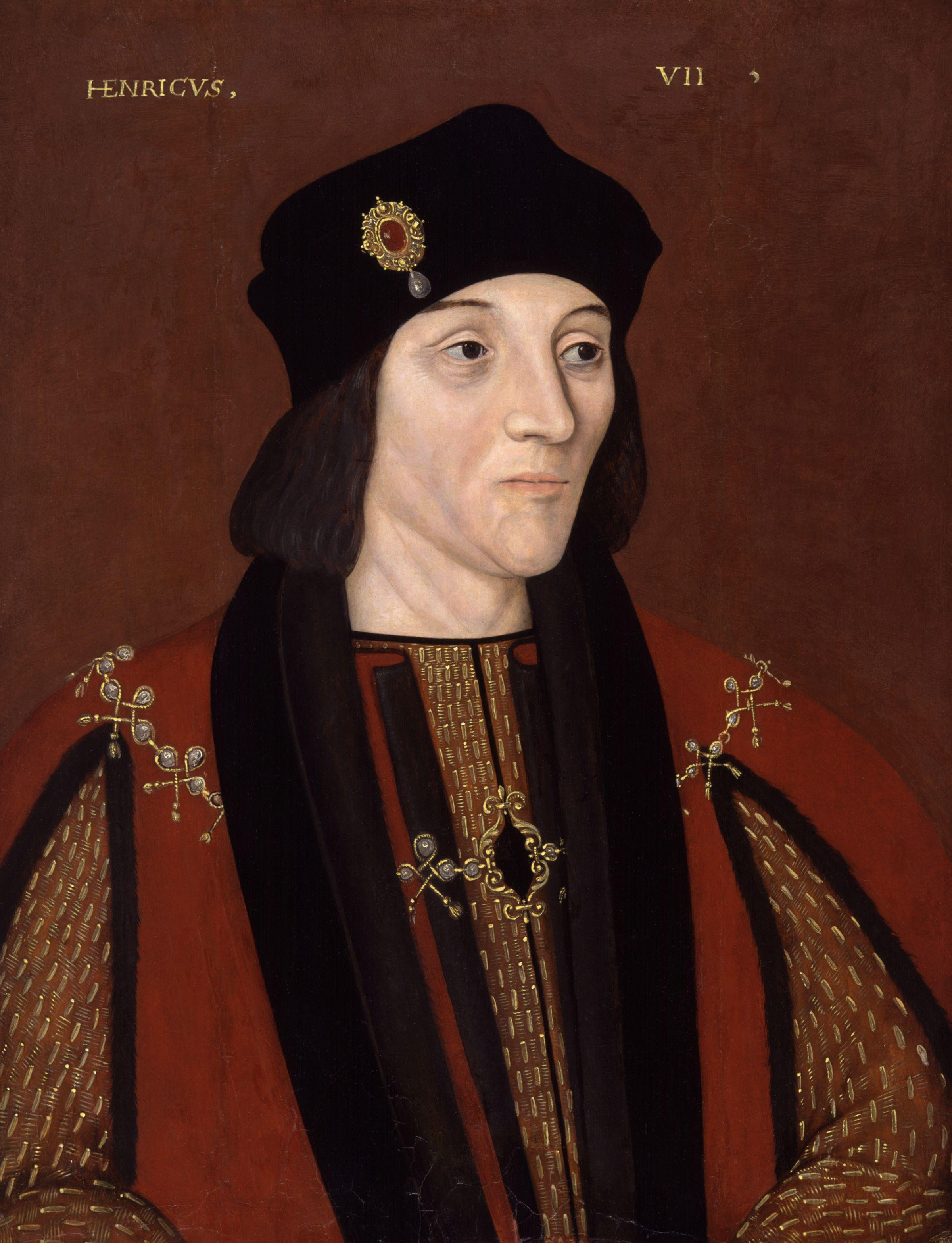
King Henry VII, who suppressed the Order in 1494
