= Richard Edgcumbe (died 1489) =

English courtier and politician

- Arms of Edgcumbe: Gules, on a bend ermines cotised or three boar's heads couped argent

High Sheriff of Devon
- In office 1486–1487

Comptroller of the Household
- In office 1485–1489

Member of Parliament for Tavistock
- In office 1467-1468; 1485-1486

Personal details
- Born: ca. 1443
- Died: 8 September 1489 (aged 45–46) Morlaix, Brittany, France
- Spouse: Joan Tremayne
- Children: 5, including Piers
- Relatives: Richard Edgcumbe (grandson)

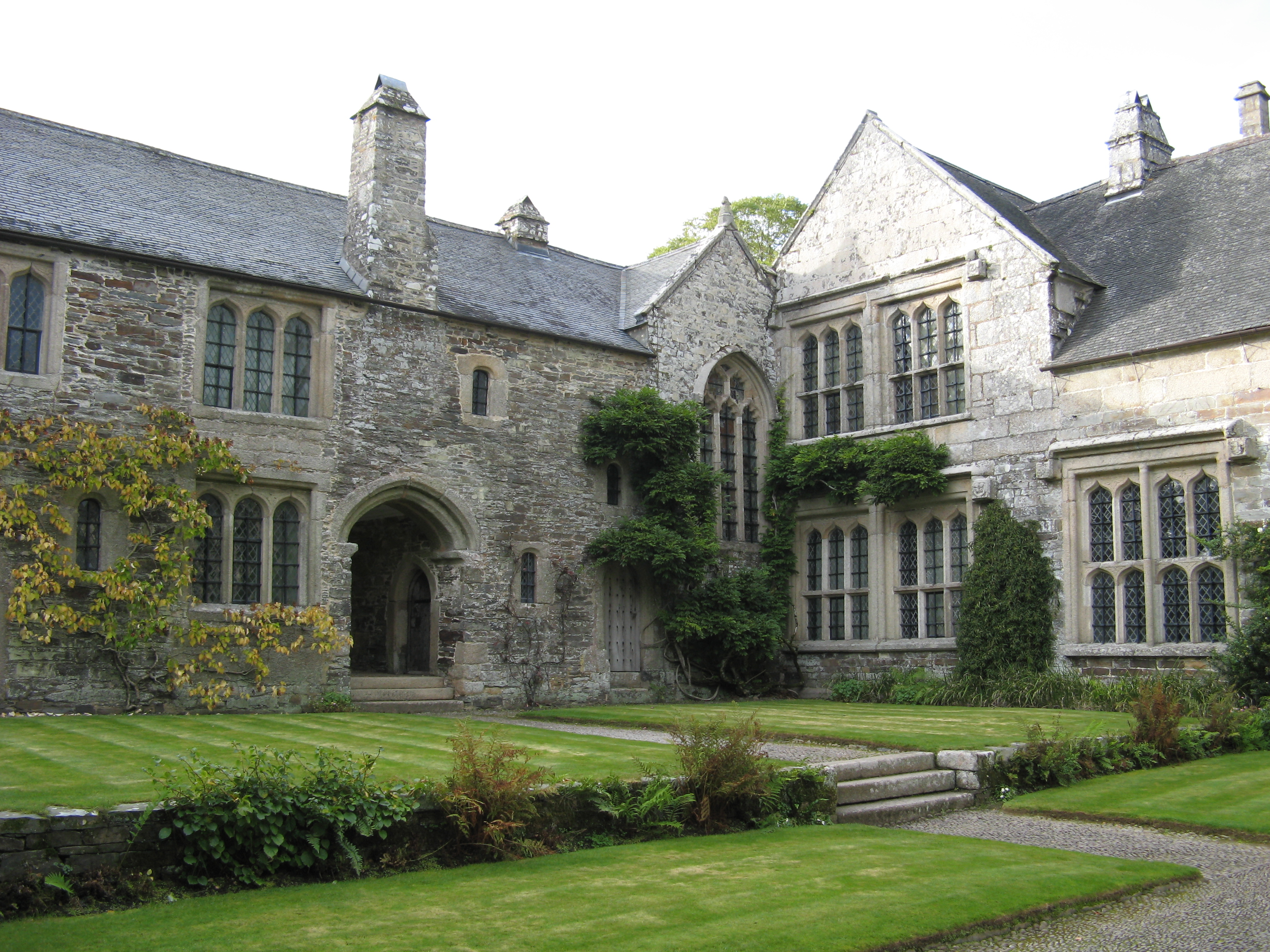
Cotehele in Cornwall, residence of Sir Richard Edgcumbe

Arms of Sir Richard Edgcumbe impaled by Prideaux, signifying the marriage of his daughter Joan to Fulk Prideaux (1472-1531) of Thuborough in the parish of Sutcombe in Devon. Bench end in Sutcombe Church

Sir Richard Edgcumbe (alias Edgecombe, etc.) (c. 1443 – 8 September 1489) of Cotehele in the parish of Calstock in Cornwall, was an English courtier and Member of Parliament.

== Origins ==
He was the son and heir of Piers Edgcumbe of Cotehele by his wife Elizabeth Holland, daughter and heiress of Richard Holland. The family is earliest recorded in 1292 when Richard Edgcombe was seated at the manor of Edgcombe in the parish of Milton Abbot in Devon, from which his family took their surname. His grandson William Edgcombe (d.1380) married the heiress of Cothele, to which manor he moved his residence.

== Career ==
He was a Member of Parliament for Tavistock in Devon, from 1467 to 1468. He was a Lancastrian and had his lands confiscated in 1471 by the Yorkist King Edward IV, although these were returned to him the next year.

Angered by Richard of Gloucester’s usurpation of the throne in 1483 and the rumours of the murder of Edward V and his brother in the Tower of London, Edgcumbe joined the rebellion led by Henry Stafford, 2nd Duke of Buckingham to dethrone the Yorkist Richard III and replace him with the Lancastrian Henry Tudor. When the rebellion collapsed and Henry's ships fled, Edgcumbe's arrest was ordered and a troop of soldiers commanded by the notoriously brutal Sir Henry Trenowth of Bodrugan were sent to arrest him. He hid on the wooded hillside of his Tamar-side home, Cotehele, and when his hiding place was discovered, threw his pursuers off the scent by filling his cap with stones and throwing it into the river, fooling his pursuers into thinking he had drowned and thus escaping certain death. After his escape, he fled to Brittany and joined Henry Tudor with whom he returned to England in 1485. He was knighted later that year after the Battle of Bosworth, where Henry Tudor and the Lancastrians were victorious.

He held important offices in the new reign: an MP for Tavistock once again in 1485, Privy Councillor, Comptroller of the Royal Household, Sheriff of Devon in 1487 and Ambassador to Scotland.

=== In Ireland ===
He carried out a number of important assignments for the new King. In 1488, following the crushing of the Lambert Simnel rebellion at the Battle of Stoke Field, he was tasked with administering the oaths of allegiance in Ireland to the Anglo-Irish nobles who had supported Simnel's claim to the throne, assisted by John Payne, Bishop of Meath, a former rebel who had been among the first to submit.

He showed his shrewd political judgment in accepting the assurances of loyalty given by Gerald FitzGerald, 8th Earl of Kildare, the most powerful of the Anglo-Irish magnates, whose influence made him an indispensable ally of the Crown; at the same time he showed his independence by refusing, against Kildare's urging, to pardon some of the more notorious rebels, notably Sir James Keating, the Prior of Kilmainham.

He took care to be approachable: having administered the oath of fealty to Thomas Cusack, the Recorder of Dublin, he dined with him "with great cheer".

== Death and burial ==
During his last mission, a diplomatic one to negotiate a truce with Anne, Duchess of Brittany, he died at Morlaix on 8 September 1489 and was buried there. His tomb was destroyed during the French Revolution.

== Marriage and issue ==
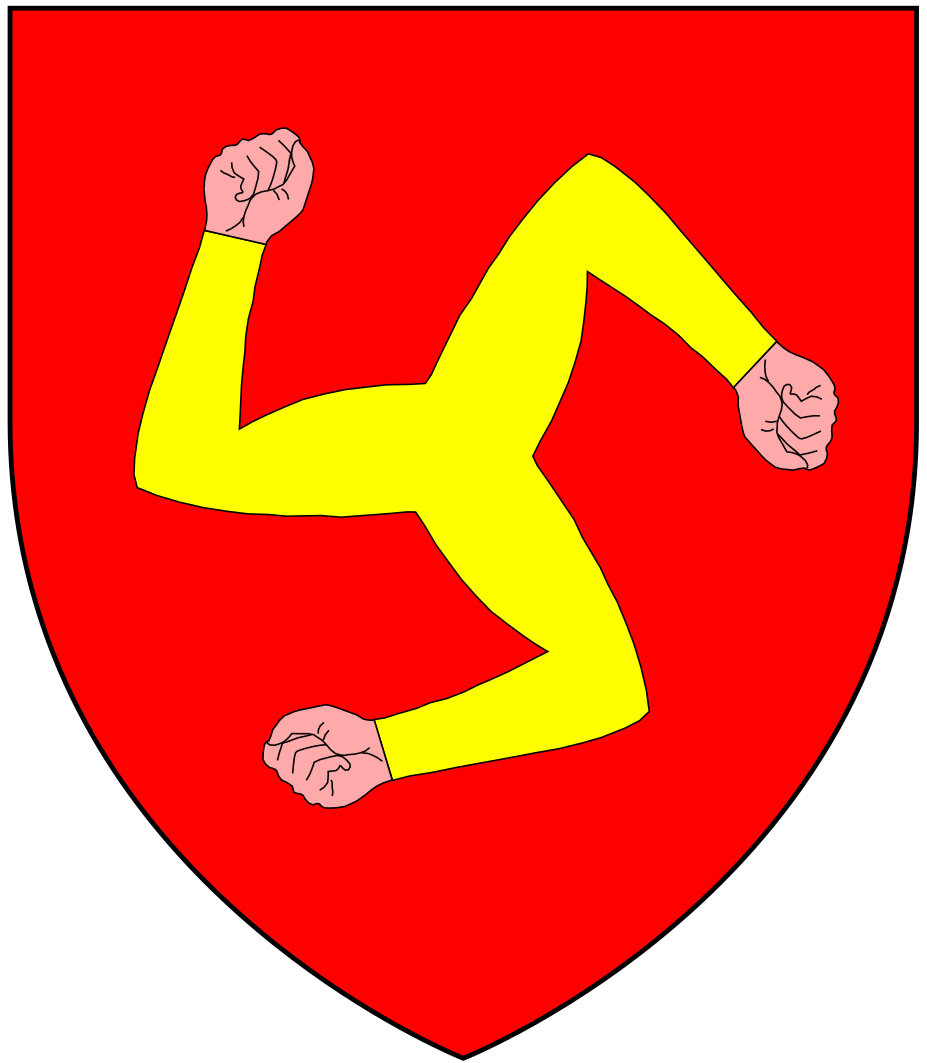
Canting arms of Tremayne: Gules, three dexter arms conjoined at the shoulders and flexed in triangle or the fists clenched proper

He married Joan Tremayne, a daughter of Thomas Tremayne (d.1482) of Collacombe in the parish of Lamerton, Devon, by his wife Elizabeth Carew, a daughter of Thomas Carew (d.1471) of Mohuns Ottery in Devon, by whom he had one son and four daughters:

- Sir Piers Edgcumbe (1468/9-1539), son and heir, whose son Sir Richard Edgcumbe (d.1562) built Mount Edgcumbe House in Cornwall and moved there from Cothele. His descendant was Richard Edgcumbe, 1st Baron Edgcumbe (1680–1758), whose second son was George Edgcumbe, 1st Earl of Mount Edgcumbe, 3rd Baron Edgcumbe (1720-1795). The earldom survives today, in a direct male line.
- Agnes Edgcumbe, who married William Trevanion of Caerhays in Cornwall;
- Margaret Edgcumbe, who married firstly Sir William St Maur, secondly Sir William Courtenay (d.1535) "The Great" of Powderham Castle in Devon;
- Elizabeth Edgcumbe, who married Wymond Raleigh of Devon;
- Joan Edgcumbe, who married Fulk Prideaux (1472-1531) of Thuborough in the parish of Sutcombe in Devon. A heraldic bench end in Sutcombe Church records the marriage.

Parliament of England
Unknown	Member of Parliament for Tavistock; 1467–1468; With: Unknown	Unknown
Unknown	Member of Parliament for Tavistock; 1485–1486; With: Unknown	Unknown
Political offices
Preceded by Sir Robert Percy	Comptroller of the Household; 1485–1489	Succeeded by Sir Roger Tocotes
Preceded by Sir John Halwell	High Sheriff of Devon; 1486–1487	Succeeded by Sir Robert Willoughby
