= Robert Preston, 1st Viscount Gormanston =

Irish peer and statesman

Robert Preston, 1st Viscount Gormanston (1435–1503) was an Irish peer and statesman of the fifteenth century who held the offices of Deputy to the Lord Chancellor of Ireland and Lord Deputy of Ireland.

== Background ==
He was the son of Christopher Preston, 3rd Baron Gormanston and Jane d'Artois: his mother was the daughter of Sir Jenico d'Artois and his first wife Joan Taffe. Her father Sir Jenico was a soldier from Gascony who had entered the English royal service in the 1390s and who later became a substantial landowner in Ireland (hence the unusual boy's name Jenico, which became common in later generations of the Preston family). Robert succeeded his father as 4th Baron Gormanston in 1450; his mother later remarried Giles Thorndon, formerly Lord Treasurer of Ireland.

Robert had close ties to Rowland FitzEustace, 1st Baron Portlester, who married as his third wife Robert's cousin, Marguerite d'Artois, and he became a supporter of Portlester's son-in-law, the 8th or "Great Earl" of Kildare. With Lord Portlester, he was one of the original Companions of the Brotherhood of Saint George, a short-lived military guild designed for the defence of the Pale (the four counties which were under secure English rule). Another useful marriage connection was through his sister Elizabeth, who married as his second wife Christopher Plunkett, 1st Baron of Dunsany.

== Career ==
In 1460, during the brief period when Richard of York, 3rd Duke of York controlled the royal government in the name of Henry VI, the office of Lord Chancellor of Ireland was held by John Dynham, 1st Baron Dynham, and Preston was appointed his deputy. He was summoned to sit in the Irish House of Lords "as his father and grandfather had been". The Parliament of Ireland passed acts in 1460 and 1462 restoring Gormanston's precedence over David Fleming, 5th Baron Slane, but their dispute dragged on until 1478, when Gormanston was raised to the superior degree of viscount. The following year Edward IV appointed his second son Richard, who was only four years old, Lord Lieutenant of Ireland, and Gormanston was appointed Lord Deputy. In 1470 the Crown granted him an allowance of £20 per annum, payable from the rents of certain lands in County Meath.

After the downfall of the House of York, Gormanston, like most of the Anglo-Irish nobility, supported the claims of the pretender to the Crown, Lambert Simnel against the new Tudor dynasty. Simnel's cause was decisively crushed at the Battle of Stoke Field in 1487. Like nearly of his peers, Gormanston was pardoned for this act of treason in 1488 and restored to favour.

In 1493 Henry VII reappointed him Lord Deputy: he held a Parliament at Drogheda, and a council at Trim, attended by Gerald FitzGerald, 8th Earl of Kildare ("the Great Earl") and most other leading Anglo-Irish magnates, where Gormanston bound them all over to keep the peace. The council does not seem to have produced any useful results: soon afterwards Gormanston, Kildare and other nobles were summoned to England to account for their governance of Ireland. In 1495, Poynings' Parliament annulled the 1493 Parliament. Gormanston died in May 1503.

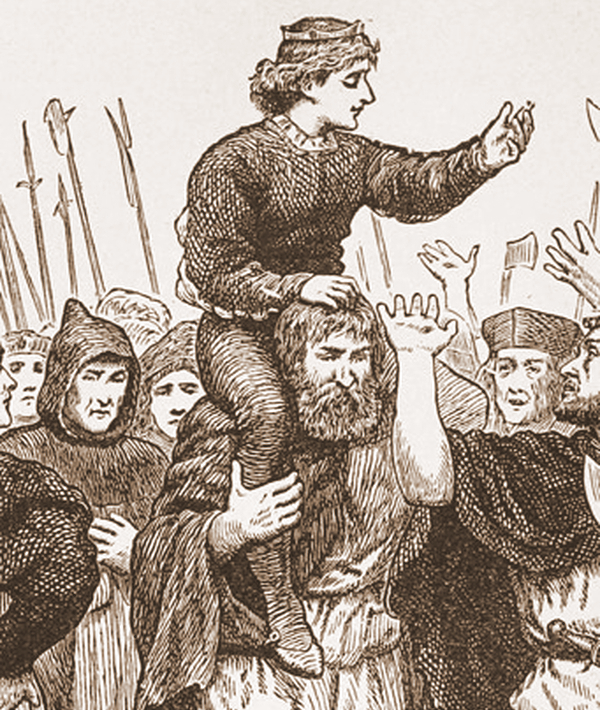
Lambert Simnel in Ireland

== Family ==
Robert Preston married Janet Molyneaux, daughter of Sir Richard Molyneaux of Sefton and his first wife Jane Haydock, daughter of Sir Gilbert Haydock of Bradley. They had at least four children:

- William Preston, 2nd Viscount Gormanston (died 1532)
- Elizabeth, who married Thomas FitzGerald of Laccagh, Lord Chancellor of Ireland
- Anne, who married Christopher Nugent, 3rd Baron Delvin
- Katherine, who married Patrick Bermingham, Lord Chief Justice of Ireland.

Peerage of Ireland
| New creation | Viscount Gormanston; 1478–1503 | Succeeded by William Preston |
| Preceded by Christopher Preston | Baron Gormanston; 1450–1503 | Succeeded by William Preston |
