= Henry Grey, 4th (7th) Baron Grey of Codnor =

English nobleman (1435 – 1496)

Henry Grey, 4th Baron Grey of Codnor (1435 – April 1496) was an English nobleman of the fifteenth century. Having initially supported the House of Lancaster during the Wars of the Roses, he later gave his allegiance to the victorious King Edward IV. Despite a record of conflict with other members of the nobility, he enjoyed the confidence of the King, who appointed him Lord Deputy of Ireland, an office in which he was a notable failure. He retained the favour of two later monarchs, Richard III and Henry VII, both of whom made him grants of land.

== Early life ==
He was the only son of Henry Grey, 3rd (6th) Baron Grey of Codnor, and Margaret Percy, daughter of Sir Henry Percy and Elizabeth Bardolf, daughter of William Bardolf, 4th Baron Bardolf. After her first husband's death, Margaret remarried Sir Richard de Vere, younger son of John de Vere, 12th Earl of Oxford, and died in 1464. He was only nine when his father died. He fought for Henry VI at the Second Battle of St. Albans in February 1461, but after the Yorkist victory at the Battle of Towton the following month he was rapidly pardoned, as a part of Edward IV's effort to secure widespread support among the nobility.

== Career ==
He was one of the principal magnates in Derbyshire and Nottinghamshire, and like many nobles of the time, he was prepared to assert his power by force, and even to act in open defiance of the law. In 1467 a serious feud erupted between Lord Grey and the Vernon family, in which one of the Vernons was killed. The King appointed a particularly strong commission of oyer and terminer headed by his brother George, Duke of Clarence, to restore order in the region. The commission does not seem to have reached a verdict, and the following year Grey and the Vernons were made to swear oaths not to intimidate the jurors appointed to investigate the matter. One difficulty in settling the feud was that while the Duke of Clarence favoured the Vernons, the King favoured Grey.

The King was prepared to tolerate a certain amount of law-breaking by members of the nobility since his own power depended largely on their support, but his patience had its limits. In 1471 Grey was charged with inciting a serious riot in Nottingham. He was summoned before Star Chamber, where the King personally questioned him about his links to the rioters. At the end of the hearing the King strictly ordered Grey not to favour or maintain any malefactors in the town of Nottingham.

Grey's record of law-breaking was one of the reasons for the passage of an act of Parliament in 1468, the Liveries Act 1468 8 Edw. 4. c. 2, declaring illegal the practice of retaining, i.e. the maintenance of a private army. Although proceedings were taken against him in the Court of King's Bench, there is no record of a conviction, and little serious effort was made to enforce the act.

He was soon restored to favour and received substantial grants of land in Ireland, and the office of Steward of the royal castles of Ulster.

== Lord Deputy of Ireland ==
Like most medieval English kings, Edward IV was normally prepared to leave Ireland to be governed by the Anglo-Irish nobility, but he made intermittent efforts to assert his authority over that Kingdom. In 1478, concerned at the increasing power of Gerald FitzGerald, 8th Earl of Kildare and his family, he dismissed him as Lord Deputy and appointed Grey in his place. Grey however faced the united opposition of the Anglo-Irish ruling class. The Lord Chancellor of Ireland, Baron Portlester, who was Kildare's father-in-law, refused to allow him the use of the Great Seal of Ireland (although Grey was able to have a new and officially approved seal minted). Sir James Keating, Prior of the Order of Hospitallers, acting Constable of Dublin Castle, refused him entry to the castle, and his efforts to hold a Parliament at Trim collapsed when the sheriffs of Dublin and Louth simply ignored the writs of summons. Unable to impose his authority, Grey left Ireland the following year, thus leaving the way open for Kildare to become all-powerful in his generation: he was later called "the uncrowned King of Ireland".

== Personal life ==
Grey died in April 1496. His first marriage on 29 August 1454 was to Katherine Strangeways, daughter of Sir Thomas Strangeways by Katherine Neville, Duchess of Norfolk, daughter of Ralph de Neville, 1st Earl of Westmorland, and his wife Joan Beaufort; the marriage was childless. He had two natural sons, Richard and Henry, for whom he made generous provision in his will.

After Katherine's death, he married secondly Margaret Stanley, daughter of Thomas Stanley, 1st Baron Stanley and his wife Joan Goushill, and widow of Sir John Boteler. She died in 1481. He married thirdly Katherine Stourton, daughter of William Stourton, 2nd Baron Stourton and Margaret Chideock;. Both his second and third marriages were childless. After Grey's death, Katherine, who received substantial lands under his will, quickly remarried Edward IV's nephew William de la Pole. As a potential Yorkist claimant to the Crown, William was soon imprisoned in the Tower of London and remained there till his death. Katherine died in 1521.

As Grey had no legitimate heir, the barony fell into abeyance between his father's three sisters Elizabeth, Eleanor and Lucy. It was finally called out of abeyance in 1989.

He is said to have been keenly interested in alchemy, and obtained a licence from the King for the transmutation of metals, on condition that he must inform the Crown if he succeeded in producing gold.
