= William Sherwood =

William Sherwood may refer to:

- William of Sherwood, 13th century English logician and teacher
- William Sherwood (bishop), 15th century English bishop
- William Sherwood (burgess), 17th century lawyer, author and politician in the Colony of Virginia
- William Hall Sherwood (1854-1911), American pianist
