= John Payne (bishop of Meath) =

Bishop of Meath from 1483 to 1506

John Payne, Bishop of Meath (c. 1430–1506), held that office from 1483 until his death in 1506; he was also Master of the Rolls in Ireland. He is best remembered for his part in the coronation of Lambert Simnel, the pretender to the Crown of England, in 1487.

== Early career ==
His early life is poorly documented, but it is known that he was born in Ireland, probably in Dublin, where the surname Payne has been common since the early fifteenth century. He joined the Dominican order, studied theology at the University of Oxford and became a Doctor of Divinity there. About 1475 he was appointed head of the English Province of the Dominican Order, and in 1483 Pope Sixtus IV appointed him Bishop of Meath.

== Lambert Simnel and Perkin Warbeck ==
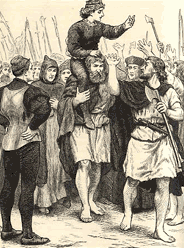
Simnel in Ireland

In 1487, a priest named Richard Simon (or Symonds) appeared in Ireland with a young boy called Lambert Simnel, who, due to their striking physical resemblance, he passed off as Edward IV's nephew Edward, Earl of Warwick, whose claim to the English throne, as heir of the House of York, was considerably stronger than that of Henry VII, founder of the new Tudor dynasty. In fact, the real Earl of Warwick was a prisoner in the Tower of London, where he remained in strict confinement until he was executed for conspiracy in 1499.

The traditionally Yorkist nobility of the Pale, headed by Gerald Fitzgerald, 8th Earl of Kildare, agreed to recognise Simnel as King, in the hope of weakening English rule in Ireland and strengthening their own power. Payne was at that time a close friend of Kildare: he was a committed Yorkist, hostile to the new dynasty and said to be convinced of the truth of Simnel's claim. He therefore willingly fell in with Kildare's schemes. On 24 May 1487 Simnel was crowned as King Edward VI at Christ Church Cathedral, Dublin: there is some dispute as to who performed the actual coronation ceremony, but it is known that Payne preached the coronation sermon.

When Simnel's cause was crushed at the Battle of Stoke Field a month later, Payne was one of the first to sue for a royal pardon. Henry VII, who showed surprising clemency to the surviving rebels, including Simnel (who became a servant in the royal kitchen), readily granted it, although he had previously asked the Pope to excommunicate him.

Payne worked closely with Sir Richard Edgcumbe, the English official sent by Henry to treat with the rebels, and helped to persuade Kildare to come to terms with him. He was also chosen to proclaim a general pardon, and to give absolution. When a general pardon for those rebels who had submitted to the King's mercy was duly granted, Kildare commissioned Payne to write to the King to thank him for his clemency.

During the later attempt in 1495 to put another pretender, Perkin Warbeck, on the throne, Payne prudently remained passive, although he was required afterwards to enter a bond for good behaviour, which suggests that his loyalty to the Tudor dynasty was still questioned. Again the King showed clemency to those who had supported Warbeck's claim to the throne, remarking drily that this should be the end of pretenders to his Crown and of Irish rebellions in support of them, unless the Irish wanted to "crown an ape".

== Later years ==
In 1489, Payne participated in a provincial council at Armagh, which attempted to settle a long-standing dispute between two rival claimants to the office of Bishop of Kilmore. His relations with the Archbishop of Armagh, the Italian-born Octavian De Spinellis, generally known as Ottaviano de Palatio, whom he accused of tyranny, were strained. He had previously accused the Archbishop of complicity in the Simnel invasion, a hypocritical act given his own deep involvement in it, and a most implausible charge in view of the Archbishop's nationality and lack of interest in domestic politics. His motive for attacking Palatio was presumably to increase his own standing at Court, but his accusations had no effect. In 1495, he attended the Synod of Drogheda, which dealt mainly with complaints by the mendicant orders that the secular orders were infringing their privileges. Payne issued a Pastoral Letter on foot of the Synod's deliberations.

As the decade went on, he spent more time at the English Court, where he gained the trust of the King. His growing political influence may have been the cause of his breach with the Earl of Kildare, who was not a man to tolerate any rival for power: it was said that they became as great enemies as they had once been friends. On one occasion they quarrelled in front of the King, and Kildare accused the Bishop of immorality. The King, although he was a devout enough man, is said to have been highly amused, which suggests that the accusation was not taken seriously. In 1496 Payne was appointed Master of the Rolls; it was said that the King wished him to be Lord Chancellor of Ireland, but Kildare was still influential enough to block the appointment. The two men were eventually reconciled. It was reportedly Payne who told the King that "all Ireland could not rule Kildare", prompting Henry to make his famous remark that in that case, "Kildare must rule all Ireland".

He died on 6 May 1506 and was buried in St. Saviour's Church, Dublin. He was remembered as a prelate noted for his charity and hospitality.

== Portrayal ==
In the 1972 BBC mini-series The Shadow of the Tower he was played by Reginald Barratt.
