= Companions of St George =

Companions of St George may refer to:

- Companions of the Brotherhood of Saint George, a military guild in Dublin (1474–94)
- Companions of the Guild of St George, a charitable education trust founded by John Ruskin in 1871
- Companions of the Order of St Michael and St George, members of the British order of chivalry with post-nominal CMG
