= Thomas FitzGerald, 7th Earl of Kildare =

Irish peer and statesman

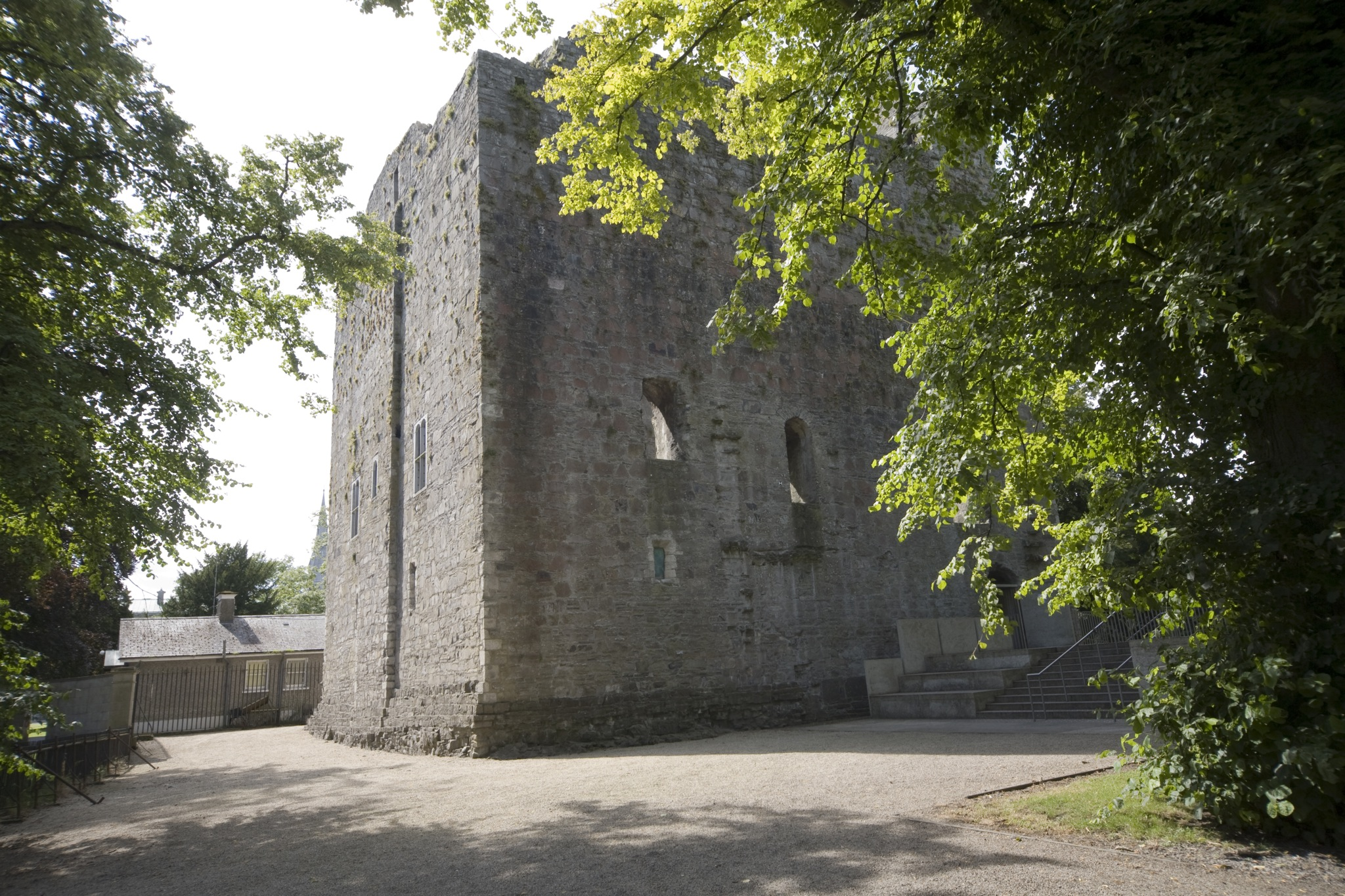
Maynooth Castle

Thomas FitzJohn FitzGerald, 7th Earl of Kildare (c. 1421 – 25 March 1477), was an Irish peer and statesman of the fifteenth century who held the office of Lord Chancellor of Ireland.

== Background ==
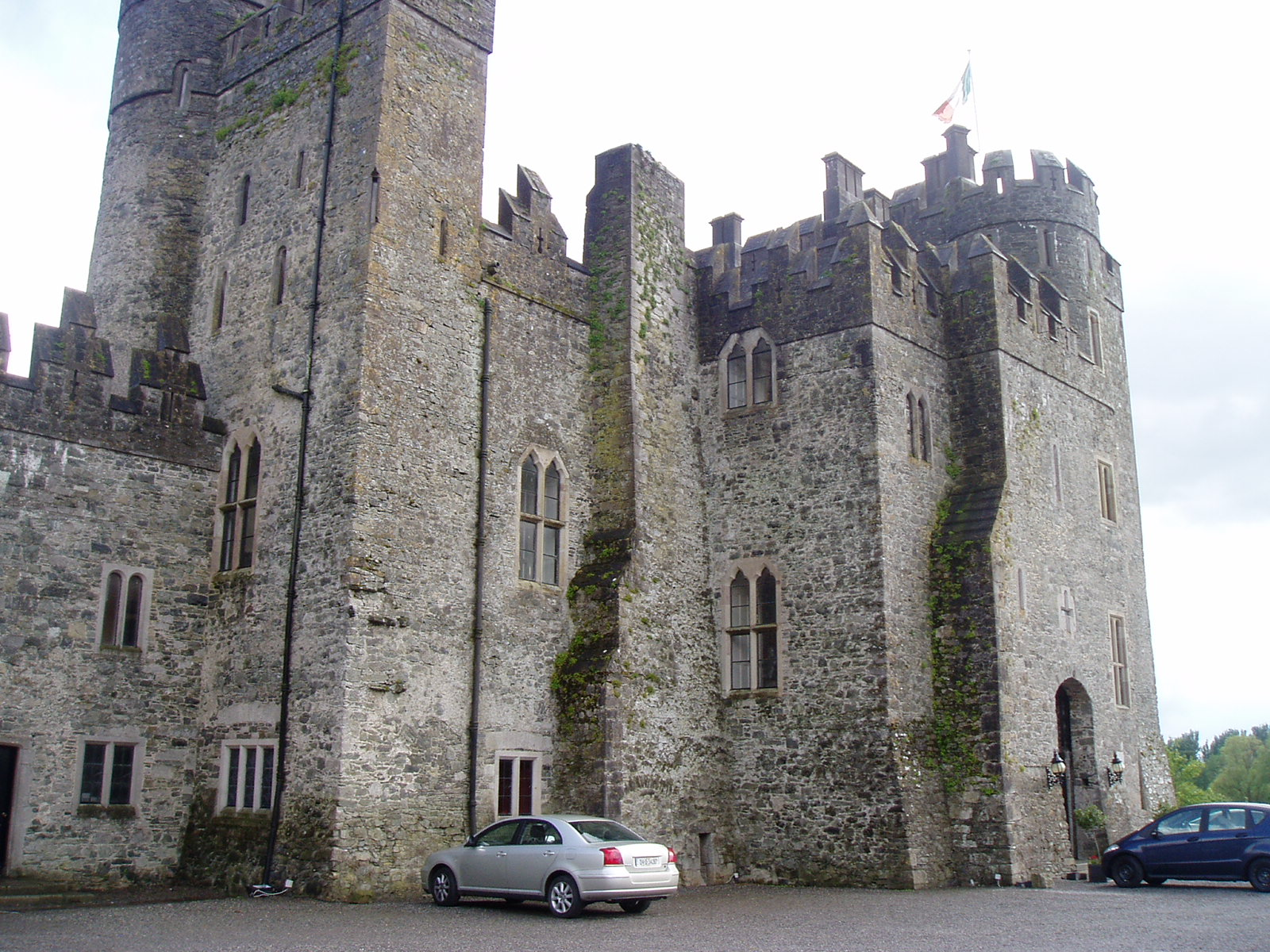
Kilkea Castle

Kildare was the son of John Fitzmaurice FitzGerald, 6th Earl of Kildare, and Margaret de la Herne. John (nicknamed "Shaun Cam" i.e. John the hump-backed) succeeded to the titles and estates of his brother, Gerald FitzGerald, 5th Earl of Kildare. John strengthened and enlarged Maynooth Castle, the principal residence of the Earls of Kildare. In 1421, the 6th Earl defeated the native Irish at Kilkea. In 1426 he restored and enlarged the stronghold of Kilkea Castle which had been sacked by the Irish. John FitzGerald died 17 October 1427, and was buried at the Augustinian Priory of All Hallows, just outside Dublin.

== Career ==
Thomas was still a young man when he succeeded his father, who died in 1427. It took some years for him to defeat the rival claim to his inheritance made by James Butler, 4th Earl of Ormonde, son-in-law of the 5th Earl, in right of his wife. Kildare was Lord Justice of Ireland in 1454, and again between 1461 and 1470. In about 1463 he was appointed Lord Chancellor of Ireland, a post he held until 1468. By a decree of Edward IV of England, he was allowed, as a mark of royal favour, to hold the title of Lord Chancellor for life and continued to receive the salary of the position and exercise some of its functions until his death in 1478. He was appointed Deputy to the Lord Lieutenant of Ireland, Richard, Duke of York in 1455. Thomas succeeded in making an Irish Parliament a reality: he assembled Parliament four times and got legislative independence for the Parliament which assembled at Drogheda in 1460. He was Justiciar of Ireland until 1462.

Both Thomas and his cousin Thomas FitzGerald, 7th Earl of Desmond were leaders of the home rule party. In 1468 both Desmond and Kildare were attainted and their lands forfeited and Desmond was beheaded at Drogheda on 14 February 1468 at the age of 42. Kildare was more fortunate: he escaped to England. Edward IV discovered Ireland was ungovernable without the support of Kildare, replacing the now deceased Desmond, and Kildare's attainder was reversed. Thomas became Lord Deputy again under George Plantagenet, 1st Duke of Clarence from 1470 until the Duke's death in 1478. FitzGerald was deeply concerned for the defence of the Pale, the only part of Ireland securely under English rule. He was largely responsible for the foundation of the Brotherhood of Saint George, a military guild dedicated to the defence of the Pale, in 1474, and was its first captain.

== Legacy ==
The Earls of Kildare, most notably Thomas's eldest son Gerald, the "Great Earl", over the next 60 years exercised supreme power in Ireland. The attitude of the English Crown was expressed in the saying that "since all Ireland cannot control the Earl of Kildare, then Kildare must control all of Ireland". Gerald was even allowed to marry as his second wife Elizabeth St. John, a cousin of the Tudors. Only when Silken Thomas, the 10th Earl of Kildare, rebelled against Henry VIII did they fall from power. Even then, they regained some of their influence later in the century.

The Fitzgerald Desmonds on the other hand became completely Gaelised and fought with great enmity against the English Crown, thus eventually bringing about their own destruction in the Desmond Rebellions of the early 1580s.

== Family ==
Kildare married firstly Dorothy O'More the daughter of Owny O'More, Chief of Leix from whom he got an annulment so that he could marry his kinswoman the Lady Joan, daughter of James FitzGerald, 6th Earl of Desmond.

"Others allege that Thomas the 7th Earl of Kildare before he came to the Earldom was first married to Dorothy, daughter of Owny or Anthony O'More, Lord of Leix, by whom he had one son called John, but after he attained the Earldom, he turned off and repudiated the said Dorothy and sent her home to her father, which was so highly resented by him that he resolved a severe revenge; and to that end having got together a strong party of his relatives and followers he burnt and destroyed the Earls houses and preyed on all his tenants in the county of Kildare, which although upon a private quarrel, the Earl declared traitors and as such prosecuted till they were all cut off and their estates forfeited. However they said John put aside from his right as eldest son, yet was ancestor to a great many worthy families of the name."

His children included:

from the first marriage with Dorothy O More

- John known also as Shane FitzGerald of Osberstown who married Margaret Flatesbury of Osberstown (the eldest daughter and co-heir of James Flatesbury of Osberstown, Co. Kildare and Elenor Wogan; the property of Osberstown, Co. Kildare came into the FitzGerald family through this marriage) with whom he had 3 sons:
  1. Gerald macShawn FitzGerald of Osberstown, ancestor of the FitzGeralds of Osbertstown, Co. Kildare, Cullentry Co. Meath and Killeanmore Kings Co. etc.
  2. Raymond/Redmond FitzGerald, ancestor of the FitzGeralds of Rathangan and Timahoe, Ellistown, Nurney, Drinnanstown, Clonbulloge King Co. and Peircetown Co. Westmeath
  3. Richard FitzGerald of Brownestown, ancestor of the of Brownestown alias Irishtown, Kildangan, Walterstown Co. Kildare

and from the 2nd marriage with Lady Joan FitzGerald

- Gerald FitzGerald, 8th Earl of Kildare, known as "the Great Earl", who became the dominant political figure in Ireland, and was almost all-powerful until his death in 1513.
- Sir Thomas FitzGerald of Laccagh, Lord Chancellor of Ireland, died 1487, killed at the Battle of Stoke
- Sir James FitzGerald
- Lady Eleanor FitzGerald d. 14 Nov 1497 – married Conn More O'Neill, King of Ulster and had issue:
  - Conn Bacach O'Neill
- Lady Anne FitzGerald

Kildare died in March 1477.

Legal offices
| Preceded by The Earl of Worcester | Lord Chancellor of Ireland c. 1463–1468 | Succeeded by Robert Allanstown |
Peerage of Ireland
| Preceded by John FitzMaurice FitzGerald (de jure) | Earl of Kildare before 1436–1477 | Succeeded by Gerald FitzGerald |
