= William Stourton, 2nd Baron Stourton =

Member of the Parliament of England

Arms of Stourton: Sable, a bend or between six fountains

William Stourton, 2nd Baron Stourton (died 1478) was an English nobleman, politician and administrator.

== Origins ==
Born before 1426, he was the son and heir of John Stourton, 1st Baron Stourton, and his wife Margaret, daughter of Sir John Wadham of Edge, Branscombe, Devon, Justice of the Common Pleas, and his second wife Joan Wrottesley.

== Career ==
In 1447 he was elected Member of Parliament for Dorset, gaining the seat again in 1460, and by 1450 had been knighted. In that year he was on a commission of oyer and terminer for treasons in Wiltshire, followed in 1451 by appointment to the commission of the peace for Dorset, sitting later for Somerset and for Wiltshire as well. In 1455 he was the commissioner responsible for collecting Dorset's contribution to the defence of Calais and was ordered by the Privy Council to assist the Duke of York in quelling disturbances in Devon. Between 1457 and 1466 he was on the commission of array and on the commission of oyer and terminer for Dorset, Hampshire, Somerset and Wiltshire.

In 1462 he inherited his father's lands and title, being summoned to Parliament as a baron between 1469 and 1472. In 1469 he was one of the commission for treasons which condemned Henry Courtenay, of West Coker, and Sir Thomas Hungerford, of Rowden to execution for treason at Salisbury, and in 1471 acted as arbitrator in a dispute there between the bishop, Richard Beauchamp, and the city authorities.

He died on 18 February 1478 and was buried in the church of St Michael at Mere in Wiltshire.

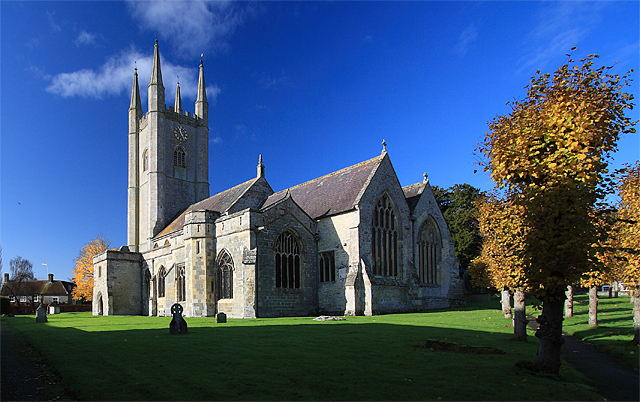
Parish Church of St Michael, Mere

== Family ==
Before 18 May 1450, he married Margaret, eldest daughter and coheiress of Sir John Chideock, of Chideock, and his wife Catherine, daughter of Ralph Lumley, 1st Baron Lumley. Their children included:

John, who was 3rd Baron until he died in 1485.
William, who was 5th Baron until he died in 1524.
Edward, who was 6th Baron until he died in 1535.
Catherine, who married first Sir William Berkeley, secondly Henry Grey, Baron Grey of Codnor, and thirdly Sir William de la Pole, nephew of Kings Edward IV and Richard III.
Margaret, who in 1476 married as his first wife Sir James Chudleigh, of Ashton.

His widow remarried John Cheney, Baron Cheyne, who died on 30 May 1499, and herself died on 12 March 1503.

Peerage of England
Preceded by John Stourton	Baron Stourton; 1462–1478	Succeeded by John Stourton
