= Thomas FitzGerald of Laccagh =

Anglo-Irish lawyer, statesman and soldier

Sir Thomas FitzGerald of Laccagh (c.1458–1487) was an Irish lawyer, statesman and soldier who was Lord Chancellor of Ireland under Richard III and Henry VII, but rebelled against Henry and was killed at the Battle of Stoke.

== Background ==
He was born about 1458, second son of Thomas FitzGerald, 7th Earl of Kildare and Joan FitzGerald, daughter of James FitzGerald, 6th Earl of Desmond. He married Elizabeth Preston, daughter of Robert Preston, 1st Viscount Gormanston and Janet Molyneux. Through his eldest daughter, Margaret, who married Garrett Wellesley, he was an ancestor of the Duke of Wellington. He resided at Laccagh (the modern spelling of the placename is Lackagh) near Monasterevin, County Kildare, and despite his rebellion against the Crown his descendants were able to retain their estates; they were still at Lackagh in the 1570s.

== Lord Chancellor ==
He became Lord Chancellor of Ireland in 1484. After the downfall of the Yorkist dynasty, the new King Henry VII confirmed him in office, but his loyalty to the new regime was deeply suspect. The Anglo-Irish nobility were, in general, strongly Yorkist in sympathy, while the Fitzgeralds of Kildare were willing to back either the Yorkist or the Tudor dynasty to advance their own power: Henry VII is said to have remarked that they would crown an ape to secure their position. Thomas's father, and his eldest brother Gerald, "the Great Earl", reached a position of almost absolute power in Ireland, a state tolerated by successive English Kings.

== Lambert Simnel ==
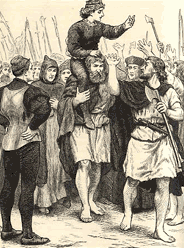
Lambert Simnel in Ireland

In 1487 the impostor Lambert Simnel, who claimed to be Edward Plantagenet, 17th Earl of Warwick, the rightful heir of the House of York, appeared in Ireland, in the company of a priest called Richard Symonds, and appealed to the Irish nobility for military aid to gain the English Crown. Simnel bore a strong resemblance to the real Warwick, who was in fact a prisoner in the Tower of London, where he remained until his execution in 1499. Thomas and his brother Gerald, 8th Earl of Kildare, were among Simnel's strongest supporters and were present at his coronation in Christchurch Cathedral, Dublin. Thomas resigned the Chancellorship and recruited a force of some 4500 soldiers, including both Old Irish and Anglo-Irish, to supplement a troop of Continental mercenaries sent by the real Warwick's aunt, Margaret, Duchess of Burgundy. He led his troops to England; but the rebellion was crushed at the Battle of Stoke, where Thomas was killed. His brother was more fortunate: Henry showed remarkable clemency to the surviving rebels, including Kildare, who received a royal pardon, and to Simnel himself, who was given a job in the royal kitchens, and later promoted to the office of Falconer.

The Fitzgeralds retained their predominance in Irish politics for another 50 years: another reported remark of King Henry VII was that if all Ireland could not rule the Earls of Kildare, then they must rule all Ireland. However his son Henry VIII came in time to take a very different view: by 1540 the Kildare Fitzgeralds had been ruthlessly crushed, although they later regained some of their old influence.

== Children ==
By his wife Elizabeth Preston, he had at least three children:

- Sir Maurice Fitzgerald of Laccagh (killed 1520)
- Margaret, who married Garrett Wellesley
- Isabella.

In 1572 Sir Maurice FitzGerald of Lackagh took a lease of the lands at Knightstown, County Laois.
