= Tomás Mac Brádaigh =

Roman Catholic Bishop

Tomás Mac Brádaigh O.S.A., (Anglicised as Thomas MacBrady) b. was the Roman Catholic Bishop of Kilmore diocese, Ireland from 1480 to 1511.

Already the Archdeacon of Kilmore, he became Bishop through a dispute which would disrupt the Diocese for 35 years. When the Archbishop of Armagh Ottaviano Spinelli de Palatio held his first Provincial Council at Drogheda in July 1480, an objection was raised to the appointment of Cormac Mág Shamhradháin because he was illegitimate. The appointment of Cormac was revoked on 20 October 1480 and Brádaigh appointed as the new bishop by Pope Sixtus IV.
