= Martin Schwartz (mercenary) =

German mercenary

Martin Schwartz (died 16 June 1487) was a German mercenary who died at the Battle of Stoke Field while fighting for Lambert Simnel, a Yorkist pretender to the English throne.

Schwartz was born in Augsburg, the son of a shoemaker. Able but arrogant, he rose to become a major military entrepreneur, organising mercenary soldiers to fight in several campaigns.

He is first recorded fighting for Charles the Bold of Burgundy at the Siege of Neuss in 1475. In 1486, he was recruited by Maximilian, later Holy Roman Emperor, to help rid the Burgundian Netherlands of the French and to suppress the Flemish rebellion. Schwartz commanded 200 Swiss mercenaries in the campaign.

When John de la Pole, 1st Earl of Lincoln fled the English court, having decided to promote the cause of the pretender Simnel, his aunt, Margaret, Duchess of Burgundy, contracted Martin Schwartz to provide 2,000 troops for an invasion. Both Lincoln and Schwartz died at the Battle of Stoke Field, when this invasion force was defeated by the army of Henry Tudor.
