= Cormac Mág Shamhradháin =

Bishop of Kilmore (d. 1511)

Cormac Mág Shamhradháin O.S.A. (anglicised as Cormack Magauran or McGovern), b. c.1442-d.1511, was the Roman Catholic Bishop of Kilmore diocese, Ireland from 1476 to 1480 and the anti-bishop of Kilmore from 1480 to 1511.

== Genealogy and birth ==
Cormac Mág Shamhradháin was a member of the McGovern clan who were the rulers in the Middle Ages of the tuath of Teallach n-Eachach in Breifne (now Tullyhaw, County Cavan, Ireland). He was born c.1442, probably in or near Drumlane Abbey, County Cavan, where his father Cormac Mác Shamhradháin O.S.A. was the Prior of Drumlane and who later in 1444 was appointed Bishop of Ardagh. As the son of a priest Cormac was therefore illegitimate at birth. Under Canon Law this was a bar to receiving Church appointments and caused him trouble in later life. Cormac was descended from the chief who ruled Tullyhaw from 1258–1272, Donnchadh 'Cime' Mág Samhradháin. His pedigree is Cormac mac Cormac mac Piaras mac Aindriu mac Cleiminnt mac Tomás Amhlaoibh mac Craithe mac Donnchadh 'Cime' Mág Samhradháin.

== Priesthood and Drumlane Abbey ==
Cormac was presumably educated at Drumlane Abbey which was founded about the 6th century AD by Saint Columba. The abbey was a chapter house of the Augustinian Abbey of Kells, County Meath and it was dedicated to Saint Mary. Cormac was subsequently ordained a priest and on 13 October 1461 he was appointed vicar of Templeport parish, County Cavan, in succession to Rory McGovern who had been excommunicated. On 26 August 1467, Cormac was transferred from Templeport to Drumlane where he succeeded John MacBrian to the post of Prior of Drumlane due to hereditary succession rights, as both his father and grandfather were previous Priors of Drumlane. He also became a member of the Augustinian Canons. The McGovern clan through the ages were associated with Drumlane and in the 15th century alone at least five of its members were appointed Prior thereof. The ecclesiastical offices in Drumlane (Abbott, Prior, Parish Priest) were generally split between the McGoverns who were the hereditary erenachs and the O’Farrellys who were the hereditary coarbs of Drumlane. Cormac retained the office of Prior until his death in 1511.

== Bishop of Kilmore ==
On the death of Seoán Ó Raghillaigh II, the Bishop of Kilmore, in 1476, Cormac Mác Shamhradháin was appointed as the new bishop on 4 November 1476 by Pope Sixtus IV.On the same date the Pope gave him a dispensation for his illegitimacy. Due to the small revenues of the diocese, Cormac was also allowed to retain his office of Prior of Drumlane. On 6 November 1476 Cormac was licensed to be consecrated as bishop by whichever bishops he chose. However immediate objections were raised to his appointment (perhaps because he was illegitimate), which resulted in a schism which would disrupt the Diocese of Kilmore for the next 35 years. When the Archbishop of Armagh Ottaviano Spinelli de Palatio held his first Provincial Council at Drogheda in July 1480, neither Cormac nor his rival and successor Tomás Mac Brádaigh was present at the council. As a result of the objections, Cormac's appointment as Bishop of Kilmore was revoked on 20 October 1480 and Tomás Mac Brádaigh, the Archdeacon of Kilmore, was appointed as the new bishop by Pope Sixtus IV. The Pope of course had already given Cormac dispensation for his illegitimacy when appointed bishop so the decision may best be viewed as a political struggle between the Lords of West Kilmore, the O’Rourkes, who backed the candidacy of their client sept of the McGoverns against the Lords of East Kilmore, the O’Reillys, who backed their client sept of the Bradys for the bishopric. Cormac however did not accept the decision and appealed the matter on several occasions and still asserted himself as Bishop of Kilmore at his death in December 1511. On 25 November 1482 Primate Octavian arranged a meeting between the two rivals at Inismor in Lough Gowna in order to come to a settlement. At the meeting, in return for certain payments from Tomás Mac Brádaigh, Cormac undertook to renounce all his emoluments from the two rural deaneries of Drumlane and Rossinver Dartry and also to refrain from seeking any further apostolic letters against the new bishop and to abide by the pledges given on his behalf by any nobles or poets. In the document Cormac is referred to as Prior of Drumlane. On 21 November 1483 the Consistorial Archives refer to Cormac as Electus Kilmorensis which probably meant Cormac was regarded as the Deputy Bishop of Kilmore with some rights, perhaps being in charge of the Breifne O’Rourke part of the Diocese from Drumlane westwards. The confusion about who was bishop was still ongoing in 1487 where the preface to the Thebaid of Statius stated- "This book was written a.d. 1487… and at the same period there were two bishops in the bishopric of Kilmore, to wit, Cormac, son of the bishop Magauran, and Thomas son of Andrew MacBrady, each one of them alleging that he himself is bishop there." An attempt to resolve the impasse was made at the Provincial Council of Armagh held in 1489 at St. Mary's Church, Ardee, County Louth under the presidency of Dr. John Payne, Bishop of Meath. The Council appointed said Dr. Payne together with Bishop Uilliam Ó Fearghail of Ardagh to look into the matter. These two bishops met and co-opted the new bishop of Clogher John Edmund de Courcy as a third arbitrator. Their decision was that they "adjudged the rule, administration and property of said church to said Thomas, and the proceedings regarding them of said Cormac they declared to be rash, unlawful and de facto presumptuous, and imposed on Cormac perpetual silence, which sentence not having been appealed against, in rem transivit indicatam". However that Cormac refused to take this decision lying down is evident from his attendance at the Provincial Synod of 1492 and the attendance at the Synod of Drogheda on 6 July 1495 of both Cormac and Thomas where they were styled as- "Thomas et Cormac gratia divina Kilmorensis Episcopi" (Tomás and Cormac, by the grace of God, Bishops of Kilmore). and No records of attendance survive for the subsequent Provincial Councils of 1498 and 1501. At those of 1504 and 1507, Cormac was absent but Tomás Mac Brádaigh was present.

After disputing the See of Kilmore for 35 years, it was perhaps fitting that both bishops died within four months of each other. Bishop Tomás Mac Brádaigh died at Dromahaire, County Leitrim on Tuesday 29 July 1511 and was buried in Cavan Monastery on the following Friday 1 August 1511, with presumably Cormac in attendance. Diarmaid Ó Raghillaigh was then appointed as successor to Tomás Mac Brádaigh as the Bishop of Kilmore by Pope Julius II. However Cormac Mág Shamhradháin was still claiming the bishopric so an appeal was made by the new Bishop Diarmaid to Pope Julius II to implement the decision of the 1489 Ardee Synod. Before the Pope made his decision, Cormac died in December 1211 but as news to Rome travelled slowly in those days and the Vatican bureaucracy even slower, the word of his death had not reached the Pope by 3 June 1512 when Julius II issued a Bull which- "commanded the Bishop of Meath, and the Dean and Archdeacon of Kilmore, or any two or one of them, Cormac and any others evocandis being cited, if it should be evident to them then that in the matter adjudicated upon the sentence has been rightly given, to cause it by apostolic authority, appellatione postposita, to be firmly observed."

== Death ==
Cormac died in December 1511. The Annals of Ireland for that year state- "Cormac Magauran, who was called Bishop in Breifny, died before Christmas". Dubhaltach Mac Fhirbhisigh states- "Thomas, son of Andrew Mac Brady, bishop and herenech of the two Breifnes during 30 years, quievit 1511. Cormac Mac Samhradhain, styled bishop in the Breifne, quievit 1511." He was probably buried at Drumlane.

== Descendants ==
Cormac left at least one son, Fergal Mág Shamhradháin, who continued the family traditions of priesthood and illegitimacy. Fergal was appointed vicar of Templeport parish on 22 February 1503. Fergal had at least two sons. Firstly Cormac, who was named in honour of both Fergal's father and grandfather. This Cormack had a son Edmund who lived in Kilnavert townland which was the location of the R.C. Church in Templeport. Fergal's other son was Pearse who he named in honour of his great-grandfather. This Pearse lived in Lisduff townland. Both of Fergal's grandsons received pardons in the Fiants of Elizabeth I dated 19 January 1586, No. 4813- "Pardon to Edm. m'Cormuck m’Ferrall Magawran of Kilfert and Philip m'Peirce m’Ferrall Magawran of Lysdoufe". The parish priest of Templeport in 1576 was Fergal McGovern and it is likely he was also a grandson of Fergal Mág Shamhradháin, thus continuing the priestly line of succession.
