= Gerald FitzGerald, 8th Earl of Kildare =

Irish peer and Lord Deputy (c. 1456 – 1513)

Gerald FitzGerald Gearoid Mór Mac Gearailt
- The 8th Earl of Kildare
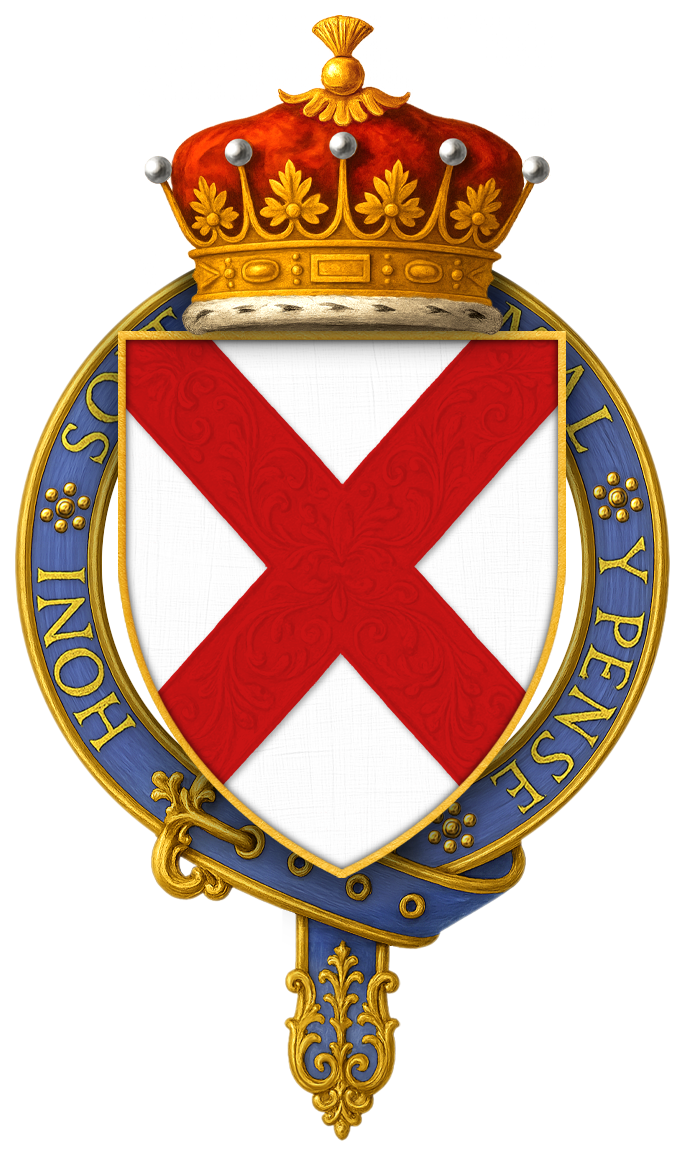
- Coat of arms of Gerard, 8th Earl of Kildare
- Reign: 1478–1513
- Predecessor: Thomas FitzGerald
- successor: Gerald FitzGerald
- Born: c. 1456; Maynooth, County Kildare
- Died: c. 3 September 1513 (aged 56–57); County Kildare
- Noble family: FitzGerald dynasty
- Spouse: Alison FitzEustace; Elizabeth St. John
- Issue: Gerald FitzGerald, 9th Earl of Kildare; Lady Eleanor FitzGerald; Lady Alice FitzGerald; Lady Margaret FitzGerald; Lady Ellis FitzGerald; Sir James FitzGerald; Oliver FitzGerald; Richard FitzGerald; Sir John FitzGerald; Sir Walter FitzGerald
- Father: Thomas FitzGerald, 7th Earl of Kildare
- Mother: Jane FitzGerald, Countess of Kildare
- Occupation: Lord High Treasurer of Ireland (1504–1513); Lord Deputy of Ireland (1477, 1479–1494, 1496–1513)

Gerald FitzGerald, 8th Earl of Kildare (born c. 1456 – c. 3 September 1513), known variously as "Garret the Great" (Gearóid Mór) or "The Great Earl" (An tIarla Mór), was Ireland's premier peer. He served as Lord Deputy of Ireland from 1477 to 1494, and from 1496 until his death in 1513.

== Family ==
Gerald FitzGerald was the son of The 7th Earl of Kildare and Jane FitzGerald, the daughter of "the Usurper", The 6th Earl of Desmond. The Gaelicised Cambro-Norman FitzGerald dynasty had risen to become the premier Irish Gall or Old English peers in Ireland. They were descended from Gerald de Windsor and the Welsh Princess Nest ferch Rhys, the daughter of Rhys ap Tewdwr, Prince of Deheubarth.

Gerald married firstly Alison FitzEustace, daughter of The 1st Baron Portlester, with whom he had five children:

- Gerald FitzGerald, 9th Earl of Kildare
- Lady Eleanor FitzGerald, married The 9th Prince of Carbery
- Lady Alice FitzGerald, married The 1st Earl of Tyrone
- Lady Margaret FitzGerald, married The 8th Earl of Ormond
- Lady Ellis FitzGerald who married The 8th Baron Slane.

He married secondly Elizabeth St. John, daughter of Oliver St. John of Lydiard Tregoze, a cousin of Henry VII, and had a further five children:

- Sir James FitzGerald of Leixlip, married Margery Darcy and was the father of:
  - Isabel FitzGerald - married Richard de Barry of Rathbarry
    - The 4th Viscount Buttevant
- Sir Oliver FitzGerald
- Sir Richard FitzGerald of Fassaroe, who married Maud Darcy, widow of James Marward, titular Baron Skryne, (whom he had murdered)
- Sir John FitzGerald
- Sir Walter FitzGerald, who married Elisabeth Plunkett, daughter of The 5th Baron of Dunsany and had issue.

All his sons by his second marriage took part in the rebellion of their nephew, the 10th Earl of Kildare, Silken Thomas, and all were executed for treason at Tyburn on 3 February 1537.

== Politics ==
Gerald FitzGerald inherited the title of Earl of Kildare in 1477. He was appointed Lord Deputy in 1477, but was quickly replaced by Lord Grey of Codnor on the supposition that an Englishman could do the job better. The Lords of the Pale set up a breakaway Parliament in protest, and Edward IV was forced to re-install Lord Kildare.

Kildare managed to keep his position after the York dynasty in England was toppled and Henry VII became king, but Kildare blatantly disobeyed King Henry on several occasions; he supported the pretender to the throne of England and the Lordship of Ireland, Lambert Simnel. Henry needed Lord Kildare to rule in Ireland, but found it almost impossible to control him. Simnel's attempt to seize the throne ended in disaster at the Battle of Stoke Field and many of his supporters, including Kildare's brother Thomas, were killed. Henry, now secure on his throne, could afford to be merciful and pardoned both Simnel and Kildare. Kildare was shrewd enough not to commit himself to the cause of the later pretender Perkin Warbeck, despite Henry's caustic comment that the Irish nobility would crown an ape to secure more power for themselves.

He presided over a period of near independence from English rule between 1477 and 1494. This independence ended when his enemies in Ireland seized power and had him sent to London as a traitor. He suffered a double blow: he was imprisoned in the Tower of London, and his wife Alison died soon after, reportedly of grief at his arrest. He was tried in 1496, and used the trial to convince Henry VII that the ruling factions in Ireland were "false knaves". The Archbishop of Cashel accused Lord Kildare of burning down his cathedral. Kildare responded, "I would not have done it if I had not been told that My Lord Archbishop was inside." This frankness delighted the King. Henry immediately appointed him as Lord Deputy of Ireland, saying "All Ireland cannot govern this Earl; then let this Earl govern all Ireland"; and allowed him to marry as his second wife Elizabeth St. John, a distant cousin of the King. Kildare returned to Ireland in triumph.

He ruled Ireland with an iron fist. He suppressed a rebellion in the city of Cork in 1500 by hanging the city's mayor, Maur. Roche. He raised up an army against rebels in Connacht in August 1504, defeating them at the Battle of Knockdoe. In 1512, after entering O'Neill of Clandeboye's territory, capturing him and then taking the castle of Belfast, Lord Kildare then for reasons now unknown proceeded through to utterly ravage the Bissett family's lordship of the coastal Glens of Antrim.

A year later, on an expedition against the O'Carrolls, he was mortally wounded while watering his horse in the River Greese at Kilkea. He was conveyed back to Kildare, where he died on or around 3 September 1513.

== Character ==
Lord Kildare has been described as a man whose exceptional charisma impressed all his contemporaries, Irish and English alike. Unlike his eldest son, who favoured diplomacy, he was described as being "open and plain" in his dealings; he was hot-tempered and unpredictable when young, but more mellow in later life.

== Portrayal ==
In the 1972 BBC miniseries The Shadow of the Tower, Lord Kildare is played by Gawn Grainger.

== The Legend of the Great Earl's Ghost ==
A legend, retold by Nuala O'Faoláin, says that Lord Kildare was skilled in the black arts, and could shapeshift. However, he would never let his wife see him take on other forms, much to her chagrin. After much pleading, he yielded to her, and turned himself into a goldfinch before her very eyes. A sparrowhawk flew into the room, seized the "goldfinch", and he was never seen again.

According to legend, the Great Earl and his soldiers now slumber in a cavern beneath the Curragh of Kildare, ready to awaken to defend Ireland in her hour of need. The Earl rises once every seven years on May Day, and rides around the Curragh on his steed. When his horse's shoes are worn down to the thickness of a cat's ear, he will lead his army against the English, drive them out, and reign as King of Ireland for 40 years.

== See also ==
- Butler–Fitzgerald dispute, which the Eighth Earl played a large part in resolving in 1492.

Peerage of Ireland
Preceded by Thomas Fitzgerald	Earl of Kildare; 1478–1513	Succeeded by Gerald Fitzgerald
