= Lord Deputy of Ireland =

Head of the Irish executive under English rule

The Lord Deputy was the representative of the monarch and head of the Irish executive under English rule, during the Lordship of Ireland and then the Kingdom of Ireland. He deputised prior to 1523 for the Viceroy of Ireland. The plural form is Lords Deputy.

== List of Lords Deputy ==
=== Lordship of Ireland ===
Portrait or Arms	Name (Birth–Death)	Nationality	Term of office			Monarch	Ref.
Portrait or Arms	Name (Birth–Death)	Nationality	Took office	Left office	Time in office	Monarch	Ref.
	Thomas de la Dale (c. 1316–1373)	English	1365	1366		Edward III	
	Thomas Mortimer (c. 1350–1399)	English	1382	1383		Richard II	
	Thomas FitzGerald, 7th Earl of Kildare (c. 1421–1477)	Anglo-Irish	1454	1459		Henry VI	
	William Sherwood (died 1482)	English	1462	1462		Edward IV	
	Thomas FitzGerald, 7th Earl of Desmond (died c. 1467)	Anglo-Irish	1463	1467		Edward IV	
	John Tiptoft, 1st Earl of Worcester (1427–1470)	English	1467	1468		Edward IV	
	Thomas FitzGerald, 7th Earl of Kildare (c. 1421–1477)	Anglo-Irish	1468	1475		Edward IV	
	Thomas FitzGerald, 7th Earl of Kildare (c. 1421–1477)	Anglo-Irish	1468	1475		Henry VI	
	Thomas FitzGerald, 7th Earl of Kildare (c. 1421–1477)	Anglo-Irish	1468	1475		Edward IV	
	William Sherwood (died 1482)	English	1475	1477		Edward IV	
	Gerald FitzGerald, 8th Earl of Kildare (c. 1456–1513)	Anglo-Irish	1477	1477		Edward IV	
	Henry Grey, 4th Baron Grey of Codnor (c. 1435–1496)	English	1478	1479		Edward IV	
	Gerald FitzGerald, 8th Earl of Kildare (c. 1456–1513)	Anglo-Irish	1479	?1494		Edward IV	
	Gerald FitzGerald, 8th Earl of Kildare (c. 1456–1513)	Anglo-Irish	1479	?1494		Edward V	
	Gerald FitzGerald, 8th Earl of Kildare (c. 1456–1513)	Anglo-Irish	1479	?1494		Richard III	
	Gerald FitzGerald, 8th Earl of Kildare (c. 1456–1513)	Anglo-Irish	1479	?1494		Henry VII	
	Walter Fitzsimon (died 1511)	Anglo-Irish	1492	1492		Henry VII	
	Robert Preston, 1st Viscount Gormanston (1435–1503)	Anglo-Irish	1493	1494		Henry VII	
	Edward Poynings (c. 1459–1521)	English	1494	1496		Henry VII	
	Gerald FitzGerald, 8th Earl of Kildare (c. 1456–1513)	Anglo-Irish	1496	1513		Henry VII	
	Gerald FitzGerald, 8th Earl of Kildare (c. 1456–1513)	Anglo-Irish	1496	1513		Henry VIII	
	Gerald FitzGerald, 9th Earl of Kildare (c. 1487–1534)	Anglo-Irish	1513	1518		Henry VIII	
	Sir Maurice Fitzgerald	Anglo-Irish				Henry VIII	
	Thomas Howard, Earl of Surrey (1473–1554)	English	1520	1522		Henry VIII	
	Piers Butler, 8th Earl of Ormond (c. 1467–1539)	Anglo-Irish	1522	1524		Henry VIII	
	Gerald FitzGerald, 9th Earl of Kildare (c. 1487–1534)	Anglo-Irish	1524	1529		Henry VIII	
	William Skeffington (c. 1465–1535)	English	1529	1532		Henry VIII	
	Gerald FitzGerald, 9th Earl of Kildare (c. 1487–1534)	Anglo-Irish	1532	1534		Henry VIII	
	William Skeffington (c. 1465–1535)	English	1534	1535		Henry VIII	
	Leonard Grey, 1st Viscount Grane (died 1541)	English	1536	1540		Henry VIII	

=== Kingdom of Ireland ===
Portrait or Arms	Name (Birth–Death)	Nationality	Term of office			Monarch	Ref.
Portrait or Arms	Name (Birth–Death)	Nationality	Took office	Left office	Time in office	Monarch	Ref.
	Anthony St Leger (c. 1496–1559)	English	1540	1548			
	Anthony St Leger (c. 1496–1559)	English	1540	1548		Edward VI	
	Edward Bellingham (1506–1549)	English	1548	1549		Edward VI	
	Lord Justices		1549	1550		Edward VI	
	Anthony St Leger (c. 1496–1559)	English	1550	1551		Edward VI	
	James Croft (c. 1518–1590)	English	1551	1552		Edward VI	
	Lord Justices (1552–1553)					Edward VI	
	Anthony St Leger (c. 1496–1559)	English	1553	1556		Edward VI	
	Anthony St Leger (c. 1496–1559)	English	1553	1556		Mary I	
	Thomas Radclyffe, 3rd Earl of Sussex (c. 1525–1583)	English	1556	1558		Mary I	
	Thomas Radclyffe, 3rd Earl of Sussex (c. 1525–1583) (as Lord Lieutenant)	English	1560	1564		Elizabeth I	
	Nicholas Arnold (1507–1580)	English	1564	1565		Elizabeth I	
	Henry Sidney (1529–1586)	English	1565	1571		Elizabeth I	
	William FitzWilliam (1526–1599)	English	1571	1575		Elizabeth I	
	Henry Sidney (1529–1586)	English	1575	1578		Elizabeth I	
	Arthur Grey, 14th Baron Grey de Wilton (1536–1593)	English	1580	1582		Elizabeth I	
	John Perrot (1528–1592)	Welsh	1584	1588		Elizabeth I	
	William FitzWilliam (1526–1599)	English	1588	1594		Elizabeth I	
	William Russell, 1st Baron Russell of Thornhaugh (died 1613)	English	Appointed 16 May 1594; sworn in 11 August 1594	1597		Elizabeth I	
	Thomas Burgh, 3rd Baron Burgh (c. 1558–1597)	English	1597	1597		Elizabeth I	
	Robert Devereux, 2nd Earl of Essex (1565–1601)	English	1599	1599		Elizabeth I	
	Charles Blount, 8th Baron Mountjoy (1563–1606) (as Lord Lieutenant 1603–1604)	English	1600	1603		Elizabeth I	
	Charles Blount, 8th Baron Mountjoy (1563–1606) (as Lord Lieutenant 1603–1604)	English	1600	1603		James VI and I	
	George Carey (c. 1541–1616)	English	1603	1604		James VI and I	
	Arthur Chichester, 1st Baron Chichester (1563–1625)	English	1605	1616		James VI and I	
	Oliver St John, 1st Viscount Grandison (1559–1630)	English	1616	1622		James VI and I	
	Henry Cary, 1st Viscount Falkland (c. 1575–1633)	English	1622	1629		James VI and I	
	Henry Cary, 1st Viscount Falkland (c. 1575–1633)	English	1622	1629		Charles I	
	Thomas Wentworth, 1st Earl of Strafford (1593–1641)	English	1632	1640		Charles I	
	Christopher Wandesford (1592–1640)	English	1640	1640		Charles I	
	Robert Sidney, 2nd Earl of Leicester (1595–1677) (as Lord Lieutenant)	English	1640	1643		Charles I	
	James Butler, 1st Duke of Ormond (1610–1688) (as Lord Lieutenant)	Anglo-Irish	1644	1650		Charles I	
	Henry Ireton (1611–1651)	English	1650	1651		Charles I	
	Charles Fleetwood (c. 1618–1692)	English	1652	1657		Charles I	
	Henry Cromwell (1628–1674) (as Lord Lieutenant 1658–1659)	English	1657	1658		Charles I	
	Edmund Ludlow (c. 1617–1692)	English	1659	1660		Charles I	
	George Monck, 1st Duke of Albemarle (1608–1670)	English	1660	1661		Charles I	
	James Butler, 1st Duke of Ormond (1610–1688)	Anglo-Irish	1662	1668		Charles I	
	Thomas Butler, 6th Earl of Ossory (1634–1680)	Anglo-Irish	1668	1669		Charles I	
	John Robartes, 1st Earl of Radnor (1606–1685)	English	1669	1670		Charles I	
	John Berkeley, 1st Baron Berkeley of Stratton (1602–1678)		1670	1672		Charles I	
	Arthur Capell, 1st Earl of Essex (c. 1631–1683)	English	1672	1677		Charles I	
	James Butler, 1st Duke of Ormond (1610–1688)	Anglo-Irish	1677	1682		Charles I	
	Richard Butler, 1st Earl of Arran (1639–1686)	Anglo-Irish	1682	1684		Charles I	
	James Butler, 1st Duke of Ormond (1610–1688)	Anglo-Irish	1684	1685		Charles I	
	Lords Justices		24 February 1685			Charles I	
	Henry Hyde, 2nd Earl of Clarendon (1638–1709)	English	1685	1687		Charles I	
	Richard Talbot, 1st Earl of Tyrconnell (c. 1630–1691)	Irish	1687	1688		Charles I	

The title subsequently became Lord Lieutenant of Ireland, with the holder also known informally as the Viceroy.
