= William Sherwood (bishop) =

English bishop and administrator working in Ireland

William Sherwood (died 3 December 1482 at Dublin) was an English ecclesiastic. He was Bishop of Meath, and later Chancellor of Ireland.

== Life ==
He achieved a doctorate in Canon Law in October 1457. He obtained the see by papal provision in April 1460. Of his earlier life, nothing is known. He soon came into conflict with Thomas FitzGerald, 7th Earl of Desmond, who was deputy to George, Duke of Clarence, Lord-Lieutenant of Ireland. The earl accused the bishop of instigating the murder of some of his followers, and in 1464 both went to England to lay their grievances before the king. Edward IV of England upheld the earl, who was supported by the Irish parliament, and acquitted him of all charges of disloyalty and treasonable relations with the Irish people. But when in 1467 he was disgraced, and succeeded by John Tiptoft, 1st Earl of Worcester. Bishop Sherwood was suspected of leading the opposition, which finally brought the earl to the scaffold.

Some years after his rival's death, Sherwood himself was appointed Lord Deputy, but his own rule was so unpopular that in 1477 he was removed from office, having governed for only two years. He was Lord Chancellor of Ireland from 1475 to 1481, when he was replaced by Walter Champfleur, Abbot of St Mary's Abbey, Dublin.

He lies buried at Newtown Abbey near Trim.
