= Lambert Simnel =

Pretender to the throne of King Henry VII of England

- Pretender
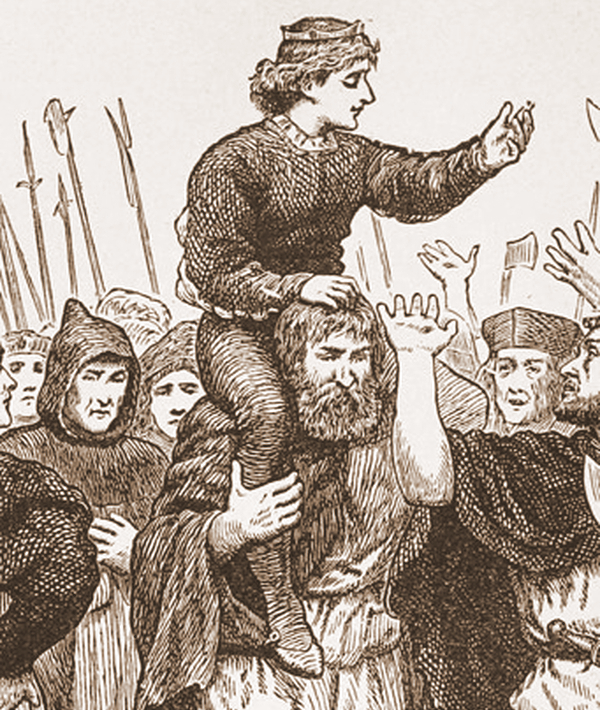
- Artist’s impression of Lambert Simnel with a crowd of supporters, from a 1910 engraving.
- Born: c. 1477
- Died: After 1534 (aged approximately 57)
- Regnal name claimed: Edward VI of England; Crowned on 24 May 1487 at Christ Church Cathedral, Dublin
- Title(s): Pretended Earl of Warwick
- Throne(s) claimed: England
- Pretend from: 1487
- Connection with: Claimed to be Edward Plantagenet, 17th Earl of Warwick, son of George Plantagenet, Duke of Clarence
- Royal House: In the name of the House of York

Lambert Simnel (c. 1477 – after 1534) was a pretender to the throne of England. In 1487, his claim to be Edward Plantagenet, 17th Earl of Warwick, threatened the newly established reign of Henry VII (1485-1509). Simnel became the figurehead of a Yorkist rebellion organised by John de la Pole, Earl of Lincoln. The rebellion was crushed in 1487. Simnel was pardoned because of his tender years, and was thereafter employed by the royal household as a scullion.

== Early life ==
Simnel was born around 1477. His real name is not known: contemporary records call him John, not Lambert, and even his surname is suspect. Different sources have different claims of his parentage, from a baker and tradesman to an organ builder. Most definitely, he was of humble origin. At the age of about ten, he was taken as a pupil by an Oxford-trained priest named Richard Simon (or Richard Symonds / Richard Simons / William Symonds) who apparently decided to become a kingmaker. Simon educated Lambert well and tutored him in courtly manners, with contemporaries describing the boy as handsome.

== Pretender ==
Simon noticed a striking resemblance between Lambert and the sons of King Edward IV, so he initially intended to present Simnel as Richard, Duke of York, son of Edward IV, the younger of the vanished Princes in the Tower. However, when he heard rumours (at the time false) that the Earl of Warwick had died during his imprisonment in the Tower of London, he changed his mind. The real Warwick was a boy of about the same age, having been born in 1475, and had a claim to the throne as the son of George Plantagenet, Duke of Clarence, King Edward IV's executed brother. Warwick was a touchstone for Yorkist affections, and people still wore his badge of the bear and ragged staff.

According to James A. Williamson, Simnel was merely a figurehead for a rebellion that was already being planned by the Yorkists:

He was merely a commonplace tool to be used for important ends, and the attempt to overthrow Henry VII would have taken place had Simnel never existed. The Yorkist leaders were determined on a serious push, rising of their party in England supported by as great a force as possible from overseas.

Simon spread a rumour that Warwick had actually escaped from the Tower and was under his guardianship. He gained some support from Yorkists. He took Simnel to Ireland where there was still support for the Yorkist cause, and presented him to the Lord Deputy of Ireland, the Earl of Kildare. Kildare was willing to support the story and invade England to overthrow King Henry. Simnel was paraded through the streets, carried on the shoulders of "the tallest man of the time", an individual called D'Arcy of Platten (this was evidently Sir William Darcy, an ally of Kildare, who is known to have been exceptionally tall). When Henry heard about what was going on, he arranged for the real Earl of Warwick to be taken from the tower and paraded through London, presumably to disprove the rumours of his death or escape. This did not prevent the rebellion, probably due to the slow spread of news at the time.

=== "Coronation" ===
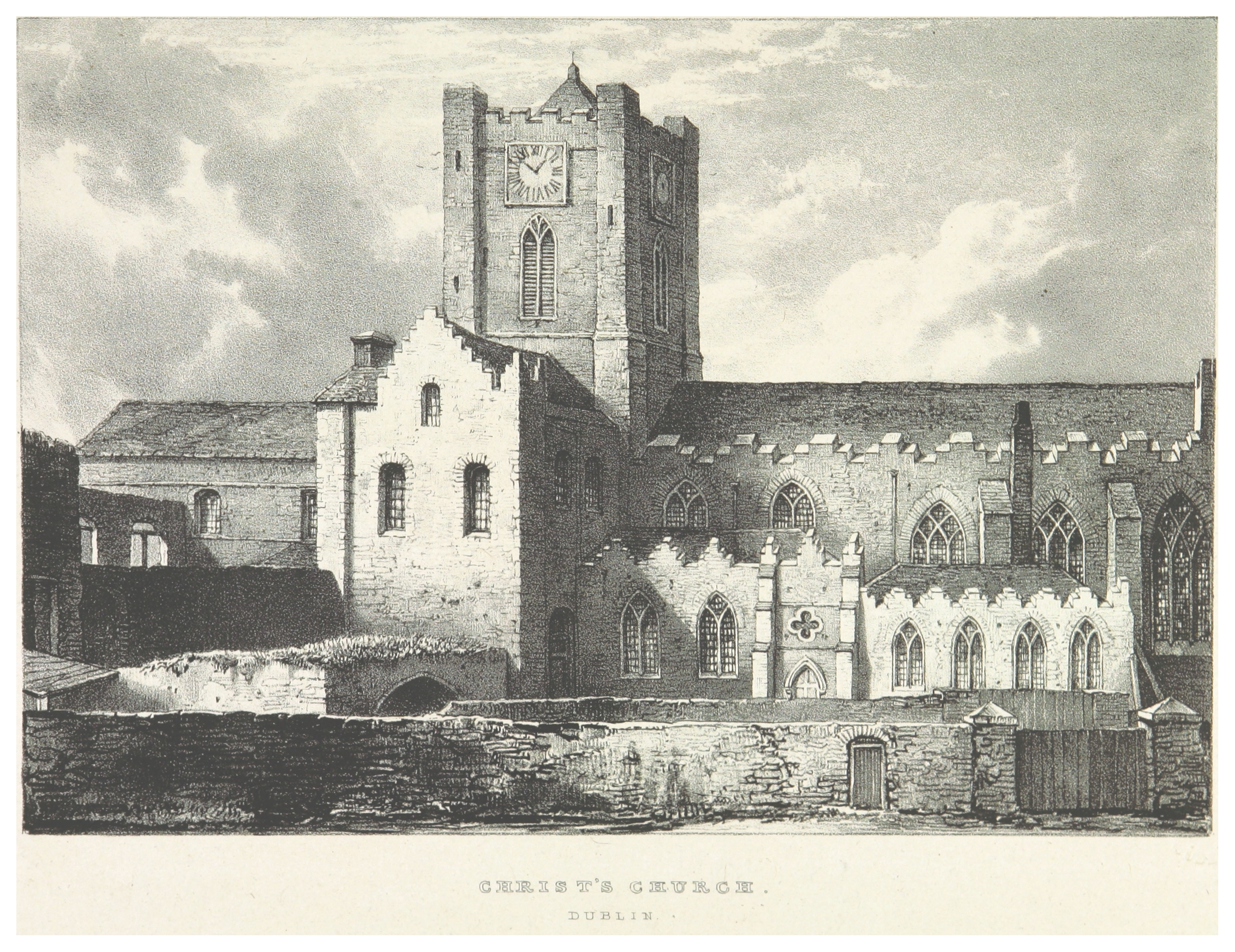
Christ Church Cathedral, Dublin, from Picturesque views of the antiquities of Ireland. Drawn on stone by James D. Harding, from the sketches of Robert O'Callaghan Newenham (1830)

On 24 May 1487 Simnel was crowned in Christ Church Cathedral in Dublin as "King Edward VI". He was about 10 years old. Lord Kildare collected an army of Irish soldiers under the command of his younger brother, Thomas FitzGerald of Laccagh.

John de la Pole, 1st Earl of Lincoln, formerly the designated successor of his uncle the late King Richard III, joined the conspiracy against Henry VII. He fled to Burgundy, where Warwick's aunt Margaret of York, the Dowager Duchess of Burgundy, kept her court. Lincoln claimed that he had taken part in young Warwick's supposed escape. He also met Viscount Lovell, who had supported a failed Yorkist uprising in 1486. Margaret collected 2,000 Flemish mercenaries and shipped them to Ireland under the command of Martin Schwartz, a noted military leader of the time. They arrived in Ireland in May. King Henry VII was informed of this and began to gather troops.

=== Battle of Stoke Field ===
On 5 June 1487 Simnel's army—mainly Flemish and Irish troops—landed on Piel Island in the Furness area of Lancashire and were joined by some English supporters. However, most local nobles, with the exception of Sir Thomas Broughton, did not join them. Henry had been receiving information about events in Ireland, although it was vague and conflicting. Thanks to existing plans to invade Ireland he was able to react speedily to the invasion and had begun mustering troops as early as February. A lack of English support led Simnel's army to change their plans, deciding their only chance of success was one swift and decisive battle. On 15 June 1487, they set up camp near the small village of East Stoke, Nottinghamshire, near Newark-on-Trent. The royal army of 12,000 set up camp 16 km (10 mi) away.

On 16 June 1487 the rebels clashed with the King's army, at the Battle of Stoke Field in Nottinghamshire, and were defeated. Lincoln and Thomas FitzGerald were killed. Lovell went missing and was rumoured to have escaped to Scotland with Sir Thomas Broughton and hidden to avoid retribution.

Simons avoided execution due to his priestly status, but was imprisoned for life. Kildare, who had remained in Ireland, was pardoned.

== Later life ==
King Henry pardoned Simnel (presumably recognising that the young pretender had been merely a figurehead pushed by adults) and put him to work in the royal kitchen as a spit-turner. When he grew older, he became a falconer. Almost no information about his later life is known. He died some time after 1534. He seems to have married, as he is probably the father of Richard Simnel, a canon of St Osyth's Priory in Essex during the reign of Henry VIII.

== Cultural depictions ==
In the 1972 BBC serial The Shadow of the Tower, Simnel was portrayed by Gary Warren.

In 1996, Blyth Power's album Out From Under the King included a song, "Lambert Simnel".

In 2006, Steeleye Span's album Bloody Men included a song, "The Story of the Scullion King", about Simnel.

In 2013, a sketch parodying Who Do You Think You Are in season 5, episode 7 of Horrible Histories depicted Simnel's claim to the throne, starring Simon Farnaby as Richard Simon, Mathew Baynton as Henry VII, Jim Howick as Kildare, and Laurence Rickard as a genealogist named "Sir Francis Guesswork."

In the 2017 Starz miniseries The White Princess, Simnel is portrayed by Max True.

The 2017 children's book The Player King, by Avi, offers a fictionalized first-person account of the key period of Simnel's life.

The 2025 historical fiction novel The Pretender by Jo Harkin fictionalizes the childhood and young adulthood of Simnel.

== See also ==
- Perkin Warbeck – who claimed to be Richard of Shrewsbury, Duke of York
- John Deydras – who claimed to be the true Edward II
- Mary Baynton – who claimed to be Princess Mary Tudor

Titles in pretence
Preceded by Henry Tudor	— TITULAR — King of England; Lord of Ireland; Yorkist claimant 1487	Succeeded by Perkin Warbeck
