= List of earls in the reign of Richard II of England =

The names listed below were Earls (suo jure or jure uxoris) or Countesses (suo jure) during the reign of King Richard II of England, who reigned from 1377 to 1399.

Earl of Arundel

- Richard FitzAlan, 11th Earl of Arundel, 9th Earl of Surrey (1376–1397)

Earl of Buckingham

- Thomas of Woodstock, 1st Duke of Gloucester, 1st Earl of Buckingham, Earl of Essex (jure uxoris) (1377–1397)
- Humphrey, 2nd Earl of Buckingham (1397–1399)

Earl of Cambridge (Second creation)

- Edmund of Langley, 1st Duke of York, Earl of Cambridge (1362–1402)

Earl of Derby (Second creation)

- John of Gaunt, Duke of Lancaster, 2nd Earl of Derby, Earl of Lancaster (jure uxoris), Earl of Leicester (jure uxoris) (1361–1399)
- Henry Bolingbroke, 3rd Earl of Derby, Earl of Lancaster, Earl of Leicester, Earl of Northampton (1399) (from 1399 King Henry IV of England)

Earl of Devon

- Edward de Courtenay, 3rd/11th Earl of Devon (1377–1419)

Earl of Essex (Fourth creation)

- Thomas of Woodstock, 1st Duke of Gloucester, 1st Earl of Buckingham, Earl of Essex (jure uxoris) (1380–1397)

Earl of Gloucester (Fourth creation)

- Thomas le Despencer, 1st Earl of Gloucester (1397–1399)

Earl of Huntingdon (Third creation)

- Guichard d'Angle, Earl of Huntingdon (1377–1380)

Earl of Huntingdon (Fourth creation)

- John Holland, 1st Duke of Exeter, 1st Earl of Huntingdon (1388–1400)

Earl of Kent (Sixth creation)

- Thomas Holland, 2nd Earl of Kent (1360–1397)

Earl of Lancaster

- John of Gaunt, Duke of Lancaster, 2nd Earl of Derby, Earl of Lancaster (jure uxoris), Earl of Leicester (jure uxoris) (1361–1399)
- Henry Bolingbroke, 3rd Earl of Derby, Earl of Lancaster, Earl of Leicester, Earl of Northampton (1399) (from 1399 King Henry IV of England)

Earl of Leicester (Second creation)

- John of Gaunt, Duke of Lancaster, 2nd Earl of Derby, Earl of Lancaster (jure uxoris), Earl of Leicester (jure uxoris) (1362–1399)
- Henry Bolingbroke, 3rd Earl of Derby, Earl of Lancaster, Earl of Leicester, Earl of Northampton (1399) (from 1399 King Henry IV of England)

Earl of March

- Edmund de Mortimer, 3rd Earl of March (1360–1381)
- Roger de Mortimer, 4th Earl of March (1381–1398)
- Edmund de Mortimer, 5th Earl of March (1398–1425)

Earl of Norfolk (Third creation)

- Margaret of Brotherton, 2nd Countess of Norfolk (suo jure) (1338–1399)
- Thomas de Mowbray, 1st Duke of Norfolk, 3rd Earl of Norfolk, 1st Earl of Nottingham (1399)
- Thomas de Mowbray, 4th Earl of Norfolk, 2nd Earl of Nottingham (1399–1405)

Earl of Northampton

- Henry Bolingbroke, 3rd Earl of Derby, Earl of Lancaster, Earl of Leicester, Earl of Northampton (1384–1399) (from 1399 King Henry IV of England)

Earl of Nottingham

- John de Mowbray, 1st Earl of Nottingham (1377–1383)

Earl of Nottingham (Second creation)

- Thomas de Mowbray, 1st Duke of Norfolk, 3rd Earl of Norfolk, 1st Earl of Nottingham (1399)
- Thomas de Mowbray, 4th Earl of Norfolk, 2nd Earl of Nottingham (1399–1405)

Earl of Oxford

- Robert de Vere, 9th Earl of Oxford (1371–1388)
- Aubrey de Vere, 10th Earl of Oxford (1393–1400)

Earl of Pembroke (Fourth creation)

- John Hastings, 3rd Earl of Pembroke (1375–1389)

Earl of Richmond (Second creation restored)

- John IV, Duke of Brittany, Earl of Richmond (1372–1393)
- Arthur III, Duke of Brittany, Earl of Richmond (1393–1425)

Earl of Rutland

- Edward of Norwich, 2nd Duke of York, Earl of Cambridge, Earl of Rutland (1390–1415)

Earl of Salisbury (Second creation)

- William Montagu, 2nd Earl of Salisbury (1344–1397)
- John Montagu, 3rd Earl of Salisbury (1397–1400)

Earl of Somerset (Second creation)

- John Beaufort, 1st Earl of Somerset (1397–1410)

Earl of Stafford

- Hugh Stafford, 2nd Earl of Stafford (1372–1386)
- Thomas Stafford, 3rd Earl of Stafford (1386–1392)
- William Stafford, 4th Earl of Stafford (1392–1395)
- Edmund Stafford, 5th Earl of Stafford (1395–1403)

Earl of Suffolk (Second creation)

- William Ufford, 2nd Earl of Suffolk (1369–1382)

Earl of Suffolk (Third creation)

- Michael de la Pole, 1st Earl of Suffolk (1385–1389)
- Michael de la Pole, 2nd Earl of Suffolk (1398–1399) (1399–1415)

Earl of Surrey

- Richard FitzAlan, 11th Earl of Arundel, 9th Earl of Surrey (1376–1397)

Earl of Warwick

- Thomas de Beauchamp, 12th Earl of Warwick (1369–1401)

Earl of Westmorland

- Ralph Neville, 1st Earl of Westmorland (1397–1425)
