= Margaret de Stafford =

English noblewoman (c. 1364–1396)

Margaret Stafford, Baroness Neville de Raby
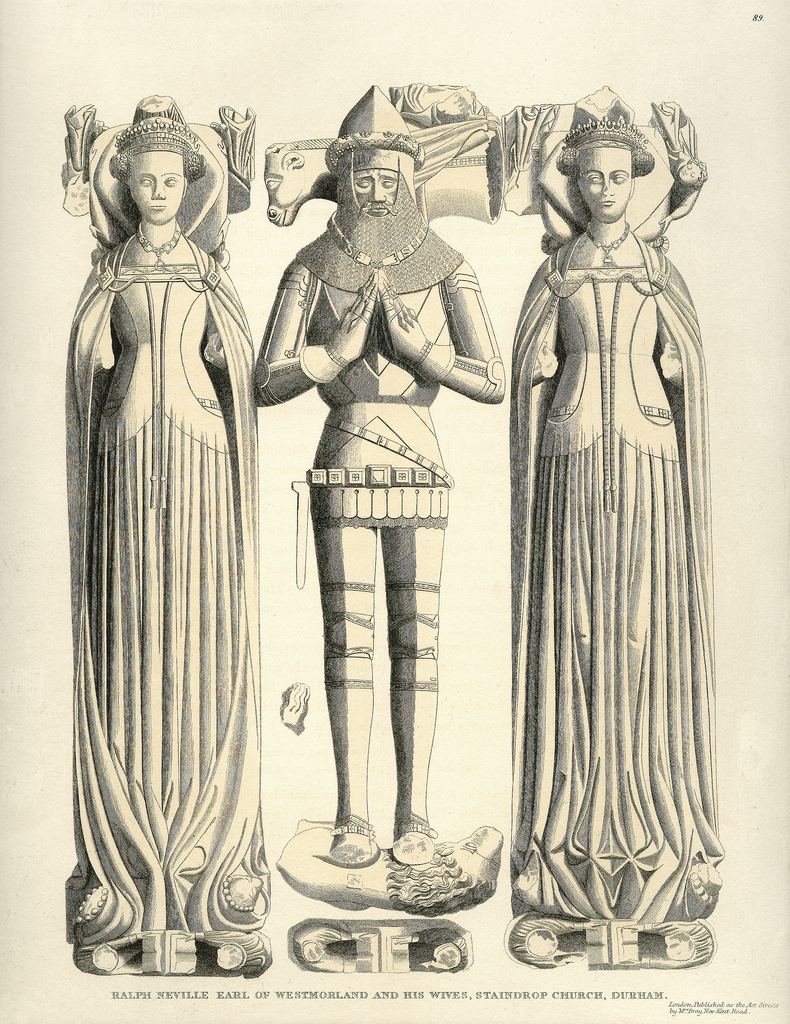
- Effigy of Ralph Neville, 1st Earl of Westmorland and his two wives, Staindrop Church
- Died: 9 June 1396
- Spouse: Ralph Neville, 1st Earl of Westmorland
- Issue: Maud Neville; Alice Neville; Philippa Neville; Sir John Neville; Elizabeth Neville; Anne Neville; Sir Ralph Neville; Margaret Neville
- Father: Hugh Stafford, 2nd Earl of Stafford
- Mother: Philippa Beauchamp

Margaret Stafford (born c. 1364; died 9 June 1396) was the daughter of Hugh de Stafford, 2nd Earl of Stafford, and Philippa de Beauchamp. She was the first wife of Ralph Neville, 1st Earl of Westmorland, and the grandmother of the 2nd Earl.

== Family ==
Margaret Stafford was the eldest daughter of Hugh Stafford, 2nd Earl of Stafford, and Philippa Beauchamp, the daughter of Thomas Beauchamp, 11th Earl of Warwick, by Katherine Mortimer, the daughter of Roger Mortimer, 1st Earl of March.

Margaret had five brothers and two younger sisters:

- Sir Ralph Stafford, who was murdered in 1385 by John Holland, 1st Duke of Exeter, half brother of King Richard II, and died unmarried and without issue.
- Thomas Stafford, 3rd Earl of Stafford (c.1368 – 4 July 1392), who married Anne of Gloucester, daughter of Thomas of Woodstock, 1st Duke of Gloucester.
- William Stafford, 4th Earl of Stafford (21 September 1375 – 6 April 1395), who died unmarried and without issue.
- Edmund Stafford, 5th Earl of Stafford, who married his brother's widow, Anne of Gloucester.
- Hugh Stafford, jure uxoris 4th Baron Bourchier (d. 25 October 1420), who married, before September 1410, Elizabeth Bourchier (c.1399 – 1 July 1433), but had no issue by her. After his death, she married Sir Lewis Robesart, standard bearer to King Henry V.
- Katherine Stafford (around 1376 – 8 April 1419), who married Michael de la Pole, 2nd Earl of Suffolk.
- Joan Stafford, who married Thomas Holland, 1st Duke of Surrey.

== Marriage and issue ==
Margaret Stafford was the first wife of Ralph Neville, 1st Earl of Westmorland. They had two sons and six daughters:

- Sir John Neville (c. 1387 – before 20 May 1420), who married Elizabeth Holland, fifth daughter of Thomas Holland, 2nd Earl of Kent, and Alice FitzAlan, and by her had three sons, Ralph Neville, 2nd Earl of Westmorland, John Neville, Baron Neville, and Sir Thomas Neville, and a daughter, Margaret Neville.
- Sir Ralph Neville (d. 25 February 1458), who married, before 1411, his stepsister, Mary Ferrers, daughter of Robert Ferrers, 2nd Baron Ferrers, and Joan Beaufort.
- Maud Neville (d. October 1438), who married Peter de Mauley, 5th Baron Mauley.
- Alice Neville, who married firstly Sir Thomas Grey, beheaded 2 August 1415 for his part in the Southampton Plot, and secondly Sir Gilbert Lancaster.
- Philippa Neville, who married, before 20 July 1399, Thomas Dacre, 6th Baron Dacre of Gilsland (d. 5 January 1458).
- Elizabeth Neville, who became a nun.
- Anne Neville (b. circa 1384), who married, before 3 February 1413, Sir Gilbert Umfraville, son of Sir Thomas Umfreville (d. 12 February 1391) and Agnes Grey (d. 25 October 1420), daughter of Sir Thomas Grey of Heaton (d. before 22 October 1369). He was slain at the Battle of Baugé in Anjou on 22 March 1421.
- Margaret Neville (d. 1463/64), who married firstly, before 31 December 1413, Richard Scrope, 3rd Baron Scrope of Bolton, and secondly, William Cressener, esquire.

== Death ==
Margaret Stafford died 9 June 1396, and was buried at Brancepeth, Durham.

After Margaret Stafford's death, Westmorland married, before 29 November 1396, Joan Beaufort, the widow of Robert Ferrers, 2nd Baron Ferrers. Joan was the legitimated daughter of John of Gaunt, 1st Duke of Lancaster, by his mistress and later third wife, Katherine Swynford. By his second marriage Westmorland had nine sons and five daughters.

== Ancestors ==
Ancestors of Margaret de Stafford

16. Nicholas de Stafford
8. Edmund de Stafford, 1st Baron Stafford
17. Eleanor de Clinton
4. Ralph Stafford, 1st Earl of Stafford
18. Ralph Basset, 1st Lord Basset
9. Margaret Bassett
19. Hawise Basset
2. Hugh de Stafford, 2nd Earl of Stafford
20. Hugh I de Audley
10. Hugh de Audley, 1st Earl of Gloucester
21. Isolde de Mortimer
5. Margaret de Audley
22. Gilbert de Clare, 3rd Earl of Gloucester
11. Margaret de Clare
23. Joan of Acre
1. Margaret de Stafford
24. William de Beauchamp, 9th Earl of Warwick
12. Guy de Beauchamp, 10th Earl of Warwick
25. Maud FitzJohn
6. Thomas de Beauchamp, 11th Earl of Warwick
26. Ralph VII de Toeni
13. Alice de Toeni
27. Mary de Toeni
3. Philippa de Beauchamp
28. Edmund Mortimer, 2nd Baron Mortimer
14. Roger Mortimer, 1st Earl of March
29. Margaret de Fiennes
7. Katherine Mortimer
30. Piers de Geneville
15. Joan de Geneville
31. Jeanne of Lusignan
