= Philippa de Beauchamp =

English noblewoman (before 1344–1386)

- Countess of Stafford
- Born: before 1344
- Died: 6 April 1386
- Buried: Stone Priory, Staffordshire
- Noble family: Beauchamp (by birth); Stafford (by marriage)
- Spouse: Hugh de Stafford, 2nd Earl of Stafford
- Issue: Margaret Stafford, Baroness Neville de Raby; Sir Ralph Stafford; Thomas Stafford, 3rd Earl of Stafford; William Stafford, 4th Earl of Stafford; Katherine Stafford, Countess of Suffolk; Edmund Stafford, 5th Earl of Stafford; Joan Stafford, Duchess of Surrey and Countess of Kent
- Father: Thomas de Beauchamp, 11th Earl of Warwick
- Mother: Katherine Mortimer

Philippa de Stafford, Countess of Stafford (before 1344 – 6 April 1386), was a late medieval English noblewoman and the daughter of Thomas de Beauchamp, 11th Earl of Warwick, KG, and Katherine Mortimer. Her maternal grandfather was the powerful Roger Mortimer, 1st Earl of March.

== Marriage and issue ==
On or before 1 March 1350, she married Hugh de Stafford, 2nd Earl of Stafford, son of Ralph de Stafford, 1st Earl of Stafford, and Margaret de Audley, suo jure 2nd Baroness Audley.

Together Hugh and Philippa had at least seven children:

1. Margaret Stafford (c. 1364 – 9 June 1396). Married Ralph Neville, 1st Earl of Westmorland as his first wife and had issue.
2. Sir Ralph Stafford (c. 1367 – July 1385). Killed by King Richard II's half-brother, John Holland, 1st Duke of Exeter in a feud during an expedition against the Scots in July 1385.
3. Thomas Stafford, 3rd Earl of Stafford (c. 1368 – 4 July 1392). Inherited the earldom from his father at the age of 18. Married Anne Plantagenet, daughter of Thomas of Woodstock, 1st Duke of Gloucester and Eleanor de Bohun. No issue, the marriage was reportedly never consummated.
4. William Stafford, 4th Earl of Stafford (21 September 1375 – 6 April 1395). Inherited the earldom from his brother at the age of 14. He was a ward of Thomas of Woodstock, 1st Duke of Gloucester. He died at 19.
5. Katherine Stafford (c. 1376 – 8 April 1419). Married Michael de la Pole, 2nd Earl of Suffolk and had issue.
6. Edmund Stafford, 5th Earl of Stafford (2 March 1377 – 22 July 1403). Inherited the earldom from his brother at the age of 17. Married Anne of Gloucester, widow of his elder brother Thomas. Edmund and Anne were the parents of Humphrey Stafford, 1st Duke of Buckingham.
7. Joan Stafford (1378 – 1 October 1442). Married Thomas Holland, 1st Duke of Surrey and 3rd Earl of Kent. No issue.

== Death ==
The Countess Philippa died in spring 1386, and it was probably this combined with the death of their eldest son that pushed her husband to undertake a series of pilgrimages. She was buried at Stone Priory, Staffordshire. The Earl died in October of the same year in Rhodes, having not yet reached his destination of Jerusalem.

== Ancestors ==
Ancestors of Philippa de Beauchamp

16. William Beauchamp, of Elmley
8. William de Beauchamp, 9th Earl of Warwick
17. Isabella Mauduit
4. Guy de Beauchamp, 10th Earl of Warwick
18. John FitzGeoffrey
9. Maud FitzJohn
19. Isabel Bigod
2. Thomas de Beauchamp, 11th Earl of Warwick
20. Roger V de Toeni
10. Ralph VII de Toeni
21. Alice de Bohun
5. Alice de Toeni
11. Mary de Toeni
1. Philippa de Beauchamp
24. Roger Mortimer, 1st Baron Mortimer
12. Edmund Mortimer, 2nd Baron Mortimer
25. Maud de Braose
6. Roger Mortimer, 1st Earl of March
26. William II de Fiennes, Baron Tingry
13. Margaret de Fiennes
27. Blanche de Brienne
3. Katherine Mortimer
28. Geoffrey de Geneville, 1st Baron Geneville
14. Piers de Geneville
29. Maud de Lacy
7. Joan de Geneville
30. Hugh XII of Lusignan
15. Jeanne of Lusignan
31. Jeanne de Fougères

== Sources ==
- Richard Glanville-Brown, correspondence, Richard Glanville-Brown (RR 2, Milton, Ontario, Canada), 17 August 2005.
- G.E. Cokayne; with Vicary Gibbs, H.A. Doubleday, Geoffrey H. White, Duncan Warrand and Lord Howard de Walden, editors, The Complete Peerage of England, Scotland, Ireland, Great Britain and the United Kingdom, Extant, Extinct or Dormant. new ed., 13 volumes in 14 (1910–1959; reprint in 6 volumes, Gloucester, U.K.: Alan Sutton Publishing, 2000), volume XII/2, page 547.
- Charles Mosley, editor, Burke's Peerage and Baronetage. 106th edition, 2 vols., Crans, Switzerland: Burke's Peerage (Genealogical Books) Ltd, 1999
