= Rimed Chronicle of Stone Priory =

The Rimed Chronicle of Stone Priory is a mid-15th century English rhyming narrative poem which was found inscribed on a tablet hanging at Stone Priory in Staffordshire, England, in 1537 at the time of the Dissolution of the Monasteries. It was transcribed and printed by William Dugdale (1605–1686) in his 1655 work Monasticon Anglicanum, described as "The Copie of the Table that was hanging in the Priorie of Stone, at the time of the Suppression of the same, in the xxix yeare of the Raigne of our Soveraign Lord King Henry the VIII".

It describes the succession of the de Stafford family of nearby Stafford Castle, feudal barons of Stafford, from the first baron Robert de Stafford (c.1039–c.1100) (alias Robert de Tosny/Toeni, etc.) who refounded the Saxon monastery of Stone Priory, an Anglo-Norman nobleman who arrived in England during or shortly after the Norman Conquest of 1066. It ends with Edmund Stafford, 5th Earl of Stafford (1378–1403), killed at the Battle of Shrewsbury, but records that his wife Anne of Gloucester (d.1438) was buried at Llanthony Priory, Monmouthshire, giving a terminus post quem date of 1438 for the verse. It records each as successive "founders", meaning more accurately "patrons" descended from the original founder, and mentions which were buried at Stone Priory or elsewhere.

The descent recorded in the Chronicle is accurate and largely agrees with modern standard sources, for example Sanders (1960) and The Complete Peerage (1953), which quotes extensively from it.

Stone Priory was first founded in about 670 AD by Queen Ermenilda, a daughter of Eorcenberht, King of Kent, and was dedicated to her son Saint Wulfad, supposedly slain and martyred by his father King Wulfhere of Mercia, who ruled from 658 until his death in 675.

The introductory part of the verse is as follows:

All manner of men, that lust for to here
How this Monasterie was founded here,
Read out this Table, that here it is written,
And all this matter so may ye witten.
Saint Armemild that good woman,
Saint Wolfald's mother this place first began,
Who soe lust to witt what wise, and why,
Read over this other Table that here is written by.
And all the whole matter there shall ye finde
In the life of Saint Wolfade and nothing left behinde;
But who that .... canons began here first to dwell,
In this present Table here shall you here tell.
In the time of the Conquest was the lord of Stafford
Baron Robert, which here was chief lord...''

== External sources ==
- Full text s:Rimed Chronicle of Stone Priory
