= Robert Wingfield (politician, died 1454) =

English politician

Canting arms of Wingfield: Argent, on a bend gules three wings conjoined in lure of the field.

Sir Robert Wingfield (died 1454), of Letheringham in Suffolk, was an English landowner, administrator and politician.

== Origins ==
Born in about 1403, he was the son of Sir Robert Wingfield (died 1409) by his wife Elizabeth Russell, daughter of Sir John Russell (d.1405), of Strensham in Worcestershire and his first wife Agnes. The elder Robert was son of Sir John Wingfield and his wife Margaret Hastings (died 1397), later second wife of Russell. As guardian of her son, it was Russell who arranged the marriage of Robert to his daughter Elizabeth.

He was the great, great nephew of Sir John de Wingfield (fl.c.1350) of Wingfield Castle in Suffolk, about 12 miles north of Letheringham, chief administrator to Edward the Black Prince (1330-1376), whose daughter and heiress Catherine Wingfield married Michael de la Pole, later 1st Earl of Suffolk, and lived at Wingfield Castle in Suffolk.

== Career ==
In 1420 he was a legatee in the will of his great-aunt Elizabeth Elmham, and in 1426 was knighted at Hereford by King Henry VI. The next year he was elected a knight of the shire for Suffolk and sat in all Parliaments until 1436.

In 1436 he was appointed steward of the lands in Norfolk of the Honour of Richmond and in 1443 he became steward to John de Mowbray, 3rd Duke of Norfolk and accompanied him on his embassy to the court of King Charles VII of France.

In December 1447 he was named as a rioter in Suffolk and was imprisoned in the Marshalsea, but was pardoned in February 1448. In September of that year he complained that the Duke of Norfolk had attacked his home at Letheringham with an armed force and had burned his furniture and removed goods worth the then huge sum of £1,200.

Despite these local difficulties, in 1449 he was elected a Member of Parliament for Hertfordshire.

== Marriage and children ==
Before 18 August 1421 he married Elizabeth Goushill (born circa 1402), a daughter of Sir Robert Goushill of Hoveringham in Nottinghamshire, by his wife Elizabeth Fitzalan. Elizabeth Goushill was co-heiress of her father's estate along with her sister Joan Goushill, the wife of Thomas Stanley, 1st Baron Stanley, and their half-brother was John de Mowbray, 2nd Duke of Norfolk. Robert Wingfield had twelve children by Elizabeth, who survived him:

- Richard Wingfield (died before 1509).
- Sir John Wingfield (died 1481), of Letheringham, who married Elizabeth Fitzlewis, a daughter of Sir John Fitzlewis, MP, by whom he had sixteen children, including Sir Richard Wingfield, Sir Robert Wingfield, Sir Humphrey Wingfield, and Thomas Wingfield.
- Sir Robert Wingfield, who married Anne Harling.
- Sir Henry Wingfield (died by May 1494), of Orford in Suffolk, who married firstly Alice Seckford and secondly Elizabeth Rookes, and was the ancestor of the Wingfields of Tickencote.
- Sir Thomas Wingfield (died 1475), who married Philippa Tiptoft, a daughter of John Tiptoft, 1st Baron Tiptoft and widow of Thomas de Ros, 9th Baron de Ros.
- William Wingfield (died 1509).
- Anthony Wingfield, of Glossop in Derbyshire, who married Mary Duke and was ancestor of the Wingfields of Onslow.
- Elizabeth Wingfield(died 28 April 1497), who in 1462 married Sir William Brandon (died 1491), of Wangford in Suffolk. Their grandson was Charles Brandon, 1st Duke of Suffolk.
- Catherine Wingfield, who married Sir John Bonville, of Halnaker in Sussex. Their daughter Florence Bonville married firstly Sir Humphrey Fulford and secondly John Bourchier, 1st Earl of Bath.
- Agnes Wingfield, who married John Fremingham.
- Alice Wingfield.
- Margaret Wingfield.

== Death ==
He died in 1454 and was buried at Letheringham. His will, made on 6 October 1453, was proved on 21 Nov 1454.
