= Hugh Stafford, 2nd Earl of Stafford =

English nobleman (c. 1342 – 1386)

Hugh de Stafford
- Earl of Stafford; Baron Stafford; Baron Audley
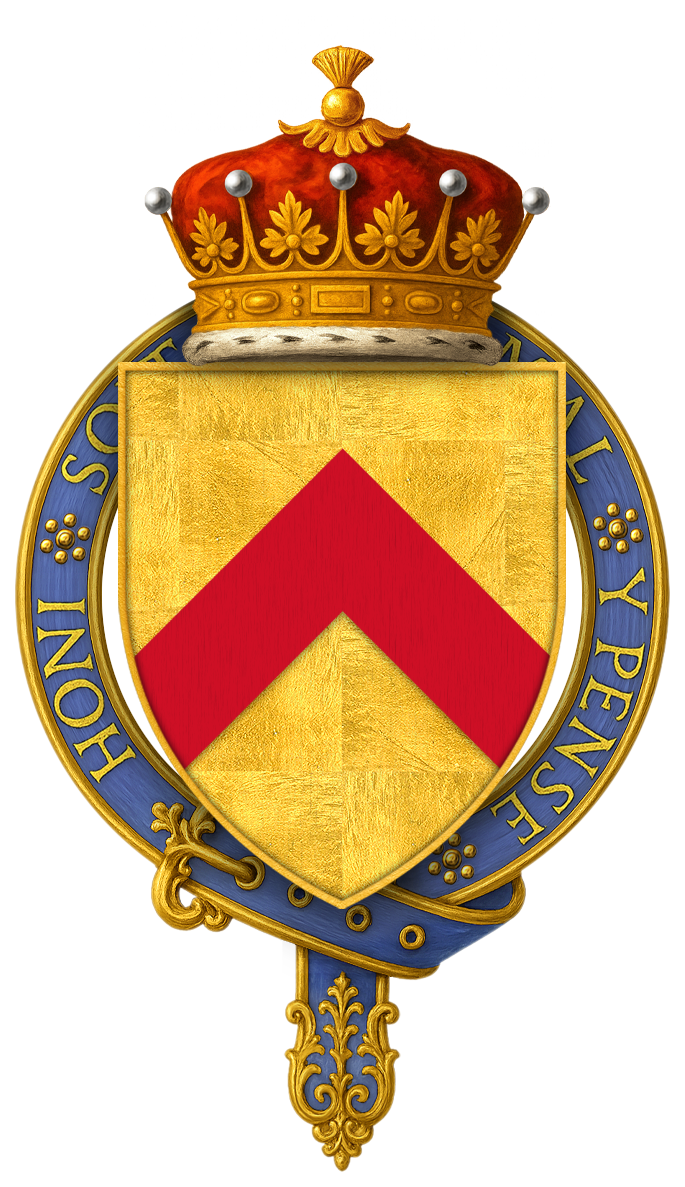
- Arms of Hugh de Stafford, 2nd Earl of Stafford, KG, "Or, a chevron gules"
- Born: c. 1342; Staffordshire, England
- Died: 16 October 1386; Rhodes
- Buried: Stone Priory, Staffordshire
- Noble family: Stafford
- Spouse: Philippa de Beauchamp
- Issue: Margaret Stafford, Baroness Neville de Raby; Sir Ralph Stafford; Thomas Stafford, 3rd Earl of Stafford; William Stafford, 4th Earl of Stafford; Katherine Stafford, Countess of Suffolk; Edmund Stafford, 5th Earl of Stafford; Joan Stafford, Duchess of Surrey and Countess of Kent
- Father: Ralph Stafford, 1st Earl of Stafford
- Mother: Margaret de Audley, 2nd Baroness Audley

Hugh de Stafford, 2nd Earl of Stafford, 3rd Baron Stafford, 3rd Baron Audley, KG (c. 1342 – 16 October 1386) was an English nobleman.

== Early life ==
Hugh de Stafford was born around 1342, the second and youngest son of Ralph de Stafford, 1st Earl of Stafford and Margaret de Audley. His elder brother, Ralph, was intended to inherit the title and had been married to Maud Grosmont, daughter of Henry of Grosmont, 1st Duke of Lancaster, and Isabel de Beaumont in 1344, with the expectation that he would expand the Stafford estates by inheriting the Lancastrian duchy. However, Ralph died early in 1347 and Hugh became heir. Around 1358, Hugh became the 3rd Lord Audley. Hugh joined his father in the French campaigns in 1359, being part of the retinue of Edward, Prince of Wales, spending time in Gascony and northern Spain.

The Annals of Bermondsey Priory record that he murdered Robert Hawley in Westminster Abbey on 11 August 1378.

== Political career ==
He spent many years in military service, before returning to England and being summoned to Parliament in 1371 as Lord Stafford and later as Earl Stafford. On 31 August 1372, he inherited the title of 2nd Earl of Stafford. He was a member of a number of royal commissions, such as ones on Scottish affairs and on coastal defence. He was on the committee of nobles who conferred regularly with the Commons, being deemed suitable by that House to be part of the new 'continual council' of state. He did not always make the best decisions though and was admonished in 1378 by his peers for censuring John Philipot, the London MP and merchant who had equipped a fleet at his own expense to defend merchant shipping.

== Marriage and children ==
On or before 1 March 1350, Hugh de Stafford married Philippa de Beauchamp daughter of Thomas de Beauchamp, 11th Earl of Warwick and Katherine Mortimer. They had at least eight children.

1. Margaret Stafford (c. 1364 – 9 June 1396). Married Ralph de Neville, 1st Earl of Westmorland as his first wife. Had issue.
2. Sir Ralph Stafford (c. 1367 – 1385). Ralph was killed by King Richard II's half-brother, John Holland, 1st Duke of Exeter in a feud during an expedition against the Scots in July 1385, over a retainer's death by one of Ralph's archers.
3. Thomas Stafford, 3rd Earl of Stafford (c. 1368 – 4 July 1392). Inherited aged 18. Married Anne of Gloucester, daughter of Thomas of Woodstock, 1st Duke of Gloucester and Eleanor de Bohun. No issue, the marriage was reportedly never consummated.
4. William Stafford, 4th Earl of Stafford (21 September 1375 – 6 April 1395). Inherited from his brother at the age of 16. He was a ward of Thomas of Woodstock, 1st Duke of Gloucester. He died at 19, no issue.
5. Katherine Stafford (c. 1376 – 8 April 1419). Married Michael de la Pole, 2nd Earl of Suffolk. Had issue.
6. Edmund Stafford, 5th Earl of Stafford (2 March 1377 – 22 July 1403). Inherited the earldom from his brother at the age of 17. He married Anne of Gloucester, widow of his elder brother Thomas. Edmund and Anne were the parents of Humphrey Stafford, 1st Duke of Buckingham.
7. Joan Stafford (1378 – 1 October 1442), married Thomas Holland, 1st Duke of Surrey. No issue.
8. Hugh Stafford, 1st Baron Stafford (c. 1382 - 25 October 1420). Married Elizabeth Bourchier, 4th Baroness Bourchier and thus 4th Baron Bourchier jure uxoris, later created 1st Baron Stafford (1411 creation), Knight of the Garter. No issue.

== Later life and death ==
The Countess Philippa died on 6 April 1386, and it was probably this combined with the death of his eldest son that pushed him to undertake a series of pilgrimages. He went first to Walsingham and then sailed for Jerusalem. He only got to Rhodes, where he died in the hospital of the knights of St John in October of that year. His bones were returned to Stone Priory, Staffordshire, for burial next to his wife.

== Sources ==
- Richard Glanville-Brown, correspondence, Richard Glanville-Brown (RR 2, Milton, Ontario, Canada), August 17, 2005.
- G.E. Cokayne; with Vicary Gibbs, H.A. Doubleday, Geoffrey H. White, Duncan Warrand and Lord Howard de Walden, editors, The Complete Peerage of England, Scotland, Ireland, Great Britain and the United Kingdom, Extant, Extinct or Dormant. new ed., 13 volumes in 14 (1910–1959; reprint in 6 volumes, Gloucester, U.K.: Alan Sutton Publishing, 2000), volume XII/2, page 547.
- Charles Mosley, editor, Burke's Peerage and Baronetage. 106th edition, 2 vols., Crans, Switzerland: Burke's Peerage (Genealogical Books) Ltd, 1999

Peerage of England
Preceded by Ralph Stafford	Earl of Stafford; 1372–1386	Succeeded by Thomas de Stafford
Preceded by Margaret de Audley	Baron Audley c.1358–1386	Succeeded by Thomas de Stafford
