= Stone Priory =

Priory in Stone, Staffordshire, England

Coordinates: 52°54′04″N 2°08′38″W

- Mediaeval rib-vaulted undercroft of crypt of the Priory, above which now stands "Priory House", built post 1750.

Religion
- Region: Staffordshire
- Year consecrated: c. 670AD

Location
- Interactive map of Stone Priory

Architecture
- Materials: Stone

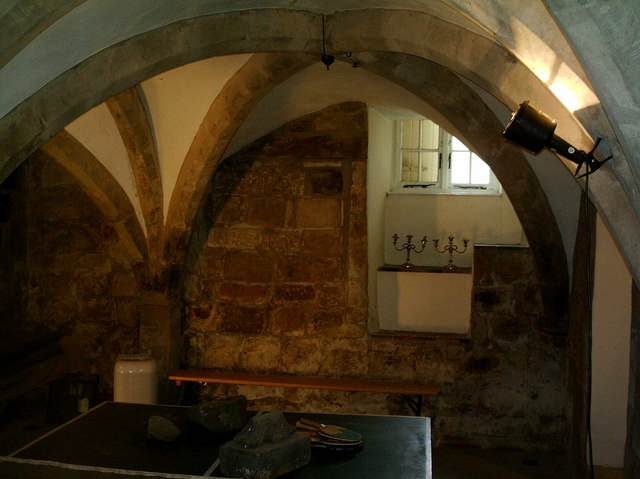
Another view of the crypt

Stone Priory was a priory founded at Stone in Staffordshire, England, in about 670 AD. The priory's church was dedicated to Saint Mary and Saint Wulfad, a local seventh-century martyr and supposedly a son of King Wulfhere of Mercia, who ruled from 658 until his death in 675. The mid-15th century Rimed Chronicle of Stone Priory, found at the Priory at the Dissolution of the Monasteries, records the founding legend and the names of the Stafford family patrons up to 1403, and the places of their burials.

== Founding legend ==
Legend has it that Wulfad and his brother Rufin were killed by their father King Wulfhere of Mercia after converting to Christianity against his wishes. Filled with remorse he allowed their mother Queen Ermenilda, a daughter of Eorcenberht, King of Kent, to found a priory on the site of their sons' grave. King Wulfhere, although already a convert to Christianity when he became king, later relapsed to paganry, according to the legend, thus his anger at his sons' conversion to the religion he had quitted. The story on which it is possibly based is however set by Bede in another part of the country more than ten years after Wulfhere's death.

== Re-founded by Staffords ==
Stone Priory was re-founded in the Middle Ages as an Augustinian priory by Robert de Stafford (c.1039-c.1100), an Anglo-Norman nobleman, the first feudal baron of Stafford in Staffordshire in England, where he built as his seat Stafford Castle. He was the ancestor of the Stafford Earls of Stafford and the Dukes of Buckingham, and many of his descendants were buried there.

== Dissolution ==
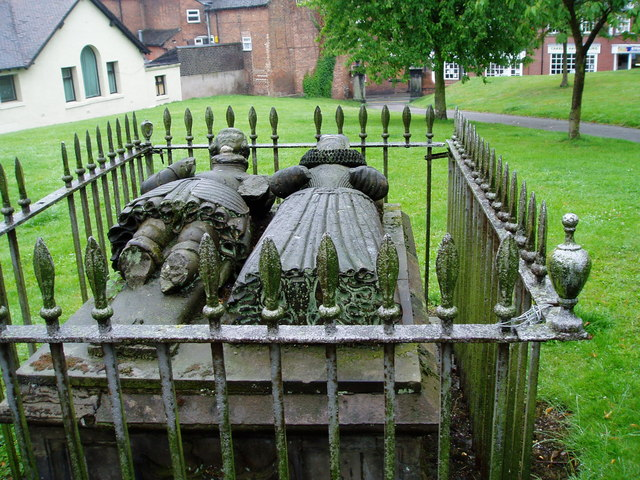
Effigies of William II Crompton (d.1603) of Stone, whose father purchased Stone Priory at the Dissolution, and his wife Jane Aston, churchyard of St Michael and St Wulfad, Stone

Following the Dissolution of the Monasteries under King Henry VIII (1509-1547), the Priory was purchased by William I Crompton, a merchant from Stafford who made his fortune in London. In 1562 he was granted a coat of arms, but they were rejected by the heralds in 1583. His son was William II Crompton (d.1603) of Stone, who married Jane Aston, a daughter of Sir Walter Aston of Tixall, Staffordshire. William II Crompton's chest tomb with recumbent effigies of himself and his wife survives, exposed to the elements and much decayed, in the churchyard of St Michael and St Wulfad, but was originally situated within the priory church. William II Crompton's son was Thomas Crompton (c.1580–1645), MP for Staffordshire 1614, 1621 and 1628.

== Demolition ==
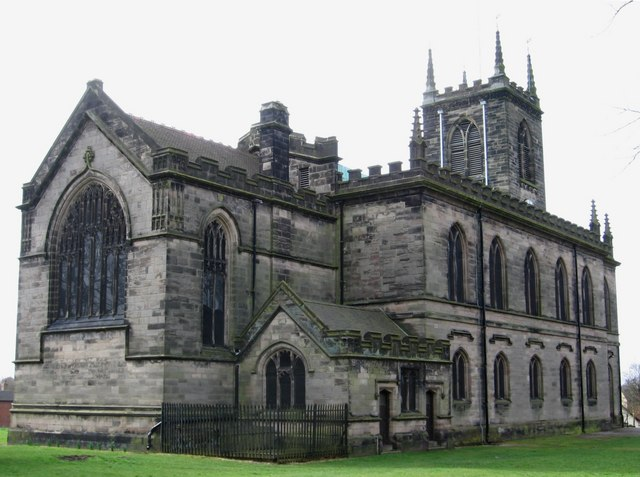
Church of St Michael and St Wulfad, Lichfield Street, Stone, built 1750s on the site of Stone Priory

The mediaeval buildings collapsed in the 1750s and were demolished, to be replaced by the surviving St Michael and St Wulfad's Church on Lichfield Street, reusing much of the stone. Parts of an ancient wall survive in Abbey Street, and part of a sub-vault of the western range of the priory buildings, a rib-vaulted undercroft of four or more bays, is incorporated in the cellars of the modern house called "The Priory", possibly built as the rectory. In the 18th century a wall was built in that house which now blocks off a section of the former crypt. In the garden to the east of that house are some slight remains, possibly of the chapter-house, including remains of a large pier of quatrefoil section with hollows between the foils, probably from the early 14th century.

== Seal ==
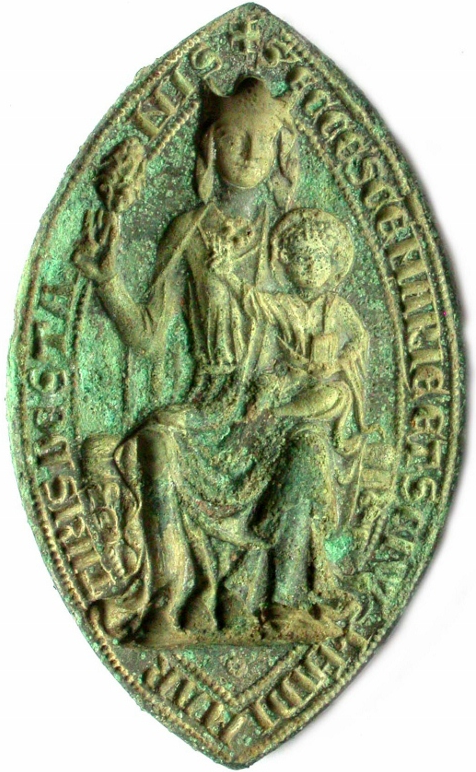
Bronze seal matrix/die of Stone Priory, 13/14th c. (mirror image, as wax seal would appear)

In August 2011 a 13th-century bronze seal, used by the Prior to seal legal documents with wax, was found by a metal detectorist in a field near Cobham in Surrey. Mandorla-shaped, as in the shape of an almond, customary for ecclesiastical seals, it depicts the Virgin Mary seated, holding up in her right hand a palm-frond of martyrdom. On her knee sits the infant Christ, with halo, holding in his left hand an object, possibly a bound book of the gospels or a model of the Priory Church building at Stone, his right hand raised with two fingers giving a sign of blessing. All is circumscribed by a Latin inscription: S(igillum) ecc(lesia)e S(an)c(ta)e Mari(a)e et S(an)c(t)i W(u)lfadi Martiris de Stanis ("the seal of the church of Saint Mary and Saint Wulfad, Martyr, of Stone").

The seal was named as the 17th best historical find in the UK on Britain's Secret Treasures, a collaboration between the British Museum and ITV television. The Stone Historical Society and churches within the town of Stone raised the £8,000 funding target required to secure the seal's permanent display in Stone. This was the result of a whirlwind of fundraising events over several months, including the sale of wax imprints of the seal. Stone Town Council donated £1,000 to the fund. Philip Leason, chairman of Stone Historical Society, said: "I am absolutely delighted that we are able to keep this important part of the heritage of Stone in the town. I would like to thank everyone who has contributed to the fund. We have now started on the second phase of fundraising to buy a case in which to display it (the one it is in at the moment is borrowed) and to have a some conservation work done on the seal".

== Notable burials ==
The following notable persons are recorded as having been buried at Stone Priory:

- Hugh de Stafford, 2nd Earl of Stafford (1342-1386), of Stafford Castle, his bones, after dying in Rhodes on crusade;
- Philippa de Beauchamp, next to her husband, Hugh de Stafford, 2nd Earl of Stafford;
- Thomas Stafford, 3rd Earl of Stafford (c.1368-1392), son and heir of the 2nd Earl by Philippa de Beauchamp.
