= Katherine de Stafford =

English noble (1376–1419)

- Countess of Suffolk
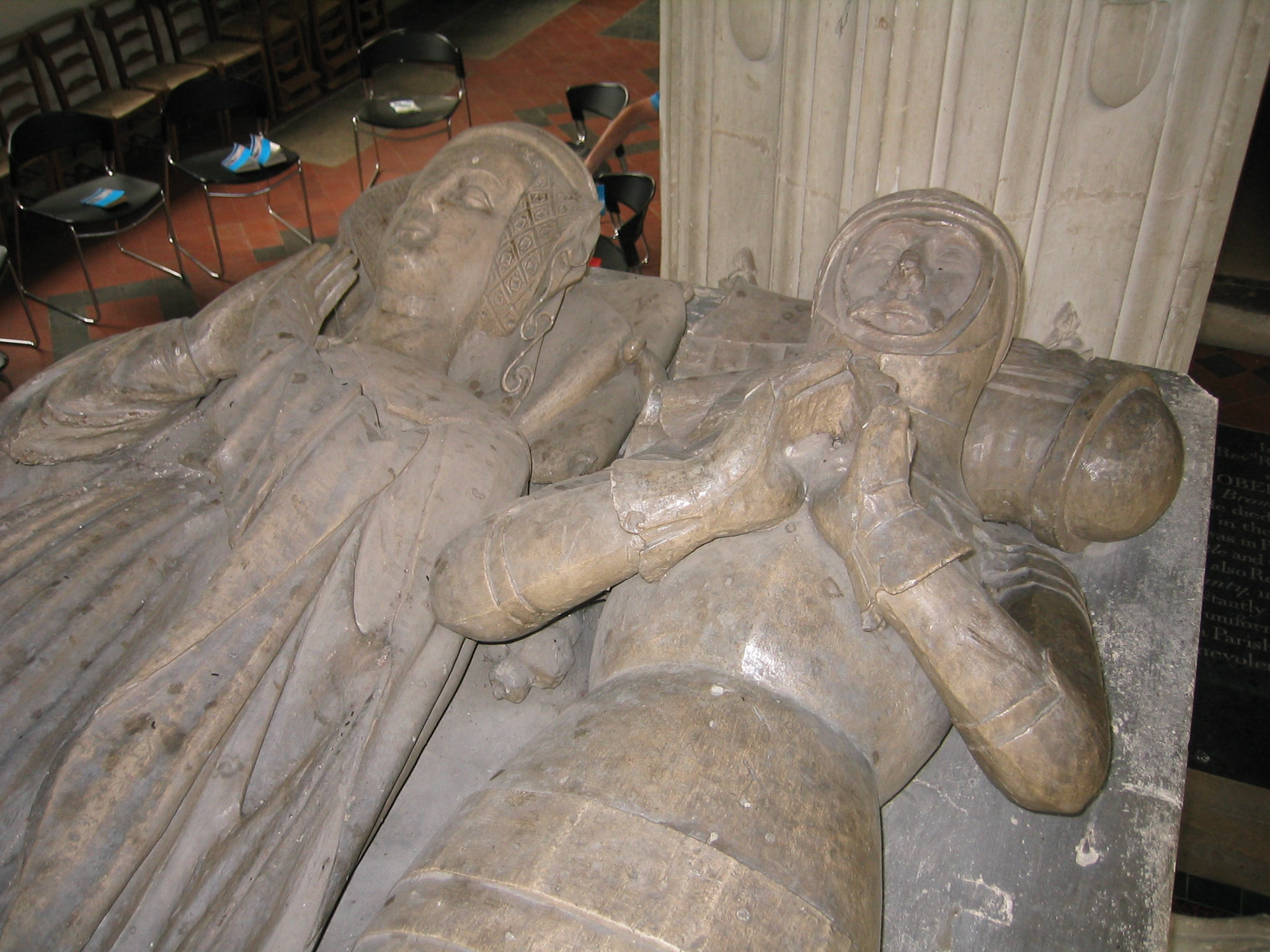
- The Tomb of Katherine de Stafford and her husband Michael de la Pole, 2nd Earl of Suffolk in Wingfield Church
- Born: around 1376
- Died: 8 April 1419
- Spouse: Michael de la Pole, 2nd Earl of Suffolk
- Issue more...: Michael de la Pole, 3rd Earl of Suffolk; William de la Pole, 1st Duke of Suffolk; Lady Isabel de la Pole, Baroness Morley; Lady Elizabeth de la Pole, Baroness Burnell
- Father: Hugh de Stafford, 2nd Earl of Stafford
- Mother: Philippa de Beauchamp

Katherine de la Pole, Countess of Suffolk (born around 1376 – 8 April 1419) was a daughter of Hugh de Stafford, 2nd Earl of Stafford, and his wife Lady Philippa de Beauchamp. By her marriage to Michael de la Pole, 2nd Earl of Suffolk, she became known as the Countess of Suffolk.

== Family ==
Katherine was one of nine children born to Hugh de Stafford, 2nd Earl of Stafford and his wife Philippa de Beauchamp. Some of her siblings included Margaret de Stafford, Countess of Westmorland and Edmund Stafford, 5th Earl of Stafford.

Her paternal grandparents were Ralph Stafford, 1st Earl of Stafford and Margaret de Audley. Her maternal grandparents were Thomas de Beauchamp, 11th Earl of Warwick and Katherine Mortimer, a daughter of Roger Mortimer, 1st Earl of March. Through his paternal and maternal grandmothers, she was descended from Edward I and John, King of England respectively.

== Marriage and children ==
Katherine was married to Michael de la Pole, 2nd Earl of Suffolk in April 1383. He was a son of Michael de la Pole, 1st Earl of Suffolk and Katherine Wingfield. They had the following issue, the eldest of whom would not be born until 1394, eleven years after their marriage:

- Michael de la Pole, 3rd Earl of Suffolk (1394–1415)
- William de la Pole, 1st Duke of Suffolk (1396–1450)
- Sir Alexander de la Pole (d. 1429), killed at the Battle of Jargeau
- Sir John de la Pole (d. 1429), died a prisoner in France.
- Sir Thomas de la Pole (aft. 1397-1433), a clerk, died in France while a hostage for his brother William. He had a daughter and heiress Katherine de la Pole (1416–1488, buried in Rowley Abbey, Oxfordshire), second wife of Sir Miles Stapleton, and had issue
- Katherine de la Pole, abbess at Barking
- Isabel de la Pole (d. 1466), married Thomas de Morley, 5th Baron Morley, and had issue
- Elizabeth de la Pole, married first Edward Burnell, son of Hugh Burnell, 2nd Baron Burnell, second Sir Thomas Kerdeston

Michael died on 18 September 1415, from the flux. Katherine died four years later, on 8 April 1419.

== Ancestry ==
Ancestors of Katherine de Stafford

16. Nicholas de Stafford
8. Edmund de Stafford, 1st Baron Stafford
17. Eleanor de Clinton
4. Ralph Stafford, 1st Earl of Stafford
18. Ralph Basset, 1st Baron Basset of Drayton
9. Margaret Bassett
19. Joan Grey of Ruthyn
2. Hugh de Stafford, 2nd Earl of Stafford
20. Hugh I de Audley
10. Hugh de Audley, 1st Earl of Gloucester
21. Isolde de Mortimer
5. Margaret de Audley
22. Gilbert de Clare, 3rd Earl of Gloucester
11. Margaret de Clare
23. Joan of Acre
1. Katherine de Stafford
24. William de Beauchamp, 9th Earl of Warwick
12. Guy de Beauchamp, 10th Earl of Warwick
25. Maud FitzJohn
6. Thomas de Beauchamp, 11th Earl of Warwick
26. Ralph VII de Toeni
13. Alice de Toeni
27. Mary de Toeni
3. Philippa de Beauchamp
28. Edmund Mortimer, 2nd Baron Mortimer
14. Roger Mortimer, 1st Earl of March
29. Margaret de Fiennes
7. Katherine Mortimer
30. Piers de Geneville
15. Joan de Geneville
31. Jeanne of Lusignan
