= Catherine Wingfield =

Catherine Wingfield may refer to:

- Catherine Woodville, Duchess of Buckingham, married name Catherine Wingfield
- Catherine Wingfield, heiress of Wingfield Castle, wife of Michael de la Pole
