= Catherine Stafford =

Catherine Stafford may refer to:

- Katherine de Stafford, Countess of Suffolk (c. 1376–1419)
- Catherine Stafford, Duchess of Buckingham (c. 1458–1497)
