= Michael de la Pole, 3rd Earl of Suffolk =

English nobleman (1395-1415)

Arms of De la Pole: Azure, a fess between three leopard's faces or

Michael de la Pole, 3rd Earl of Suffolk (1395 – 25 October 1415) was an English nobleman, the eldest son of Michael de la Pole, 2nd Earl of Suffolk and Katherine de Stafford.

He brought 20 men-at-arms and 60 archers to France in 1415, in company with his father, who died at the Siege of Harfleur. Michael thus succeeded to his title, but enjoyed it only briefly inasmuch as he was killed seven weeks later at the Battle of Agincourt, one of the few important English casualties of the battle.

Michael de la Pole married before November 1403 Elizabeth Mowbray, daughter of the 1st Duke of Norfolk.

He was succeeded by his brother William de la Pole. Tradition holds that Michael was buried at either Butley Priory in Suffolk of which he held the advowson, or the Church of St Mary the Virgin in Ewelme, Oxfordshire.

== See also ==
James Howard, 3rd Earl of Suffolk

Peerage of England
Preceded by Michael de la Pole	Earl of Suffolk; 1415	Succeeded by William de la Pole
