= Wingfield Castle =

Grade I listed quadrangular castle in Mid Suffolk, United Kingdom

- Wingfield, Suffolk
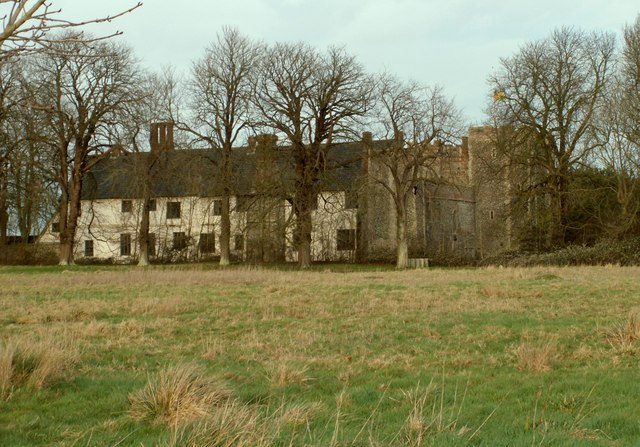
- Wingfield Castle

Site information
- Type: Manor House
- Owner: Privately owned
- Condition: Private house

Location
- Shown within Suffolk
- Coordinates: 52.3479°N 1.2595°E
- Grid reference: grid reference TM221772

Site history
- Materials: Stone

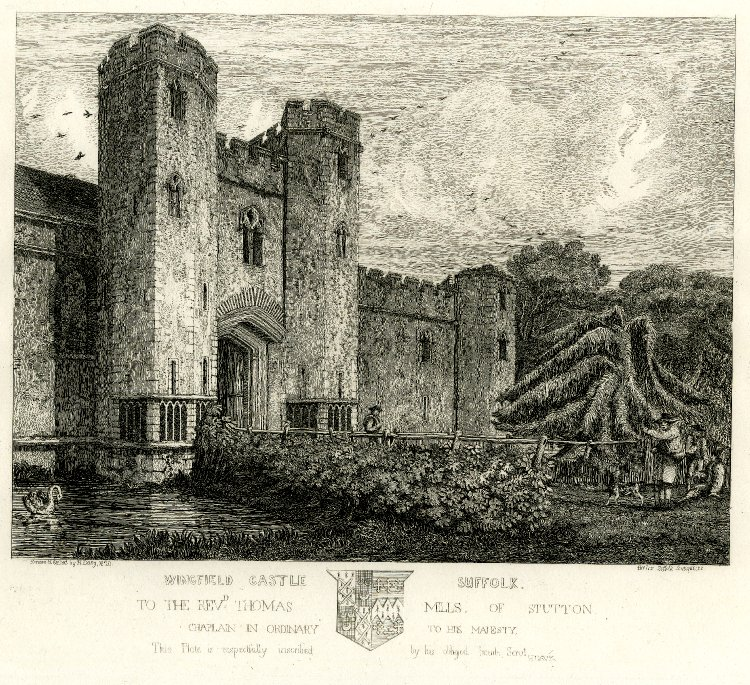
Gatehouse of Wingfield Castle in 1827

Wingfield Castle in the parish of Wingfield in Suffolk, England is a Grade I listed building which is now a fortified manor house and was the ancestral home of the Wingfield family and their heirs, the de la Pole family, created Earls and Dukes of Suffolk. It is now a private house. Sir John de Wingfield (d. circa 1361), of Wingfield, chief administrator to Edward the Black Prince (1330–1376), was the last male of his line, His daughter and heiress, Catherine Wingfield, married Michael de la Pole, who was seated at Wingfield Castle, and who in 1385 was created Earl of Suffolk. His descendant Edmund de la Pole, 3rd Duke of Suffolk (1472–1513) was forced to surrender his dukedom in 1493. It was resurrected by King Henry VIII in 1514 for his favourite Charles Brandon, 1st Duke of Suffolk (1484–1545), who was also a member of the Wingfield family and was great-grandson of Sir Robert Wingfield (died 1454), of Letheringham in Suffolk. Brandon used the castle on his tours around the county and lived at the castle with his third wife, Mary Tudor when not at their main residence of Westhorpe Hall.

== History ==
In 1384 records show that Michael de la Pole, 1st Earl of Suffolk applied for royal licence to crenellate his manor house. The need for the old castle had already ceased to exist by this time and kings were not pleased to see such strongholds built, so Wingfield Castle is a cross between a fortress and a standard moated manor house.

The grandson of Catherine Wingfield, William de la Pole, 1st Duke of Suffolk, married Alice Chaucer, granddaughter of Geoffrey Chaucer, in 1430 and lived at Wingfield Castle, although after William's death, Alice moved to another of his properties, Wallingford Castle.

Wingfield Castle became a prison several times for Charles, Duke of Orléans (father of Louis XII), who had been captured by the English at the Battle of Agincourt in 1415. Despite his family offering money for his release, he remained in captivity for many decades until 1440. This was because Henry V forbad his release, due to him being in the line of succession for the French throne and he was deemed too important to have his liberty.

Wingfield Castle passed out of the ownership of the family in 1533 after the death of Charles Brandon, 1st Duke of Suffolk's third wife, Mary Tudor. Brandon later married Katherine Willoughby and it was at this time that Henry VIII wanted the Duke of Suffolk to have his base outside East Anglia, due to tensions with his near neighbour, the Duke of Norfolk. Henry suggested Charles make his base in Lincolnshire, where his new wife owned properties. With Brandon moving to Lincolnshire, he gave up several of his Suffolk properties, including the old family residence, Wingfield Castle.

The castle later passed into the hands of Sir Henry Jerningham in 1544. He demolished the western part of the castle and built a newer manor house at right angles to the main south wall, which is the only remnant of the original castle that still stands. At that time the existing Tudor brick merlons on top of the south curtain wall were added.

The south facing battlement wall rises to a height of 42 feet (13 m) above the moat, and is 45 – 50 inches thick. The entrance gateway is approached over a bridge, which still bears the grooves of the former gate, drawbridge and portcullis. The walls are built of flint cobbles with stone for the coigns and windows. The plan of the site is quadrilateral, almost square, the west side being a little longer than the east, an enclosure of about an acre and a half. Besides the almost perfect front, the foundations of the north and east walls and two more towers are traceable. A brick bridge now leads up to the noble gatehouse where the fine depressed pointed archway, deeply recessed and moulded, still shows the portcullis groove and the old oak gates. On either side of the archway are sculptured stone panels depicting both the Wingfield and de la Pole coats of arms.

The two main towers rise to a height of 60 feet (18 m) and the octagonal corner towers rise to 50 feet (15 m). The whole castle wall was apparently intact at the beginning of the 20th century, but the north and east walls had been demolished by 1945. A drawbridge still spans the eastern side of the moat. It has been extensively reconstructed, but retains some of the original timbers.

After all the 16th century demolition and rebuilding, Jerningham later had financial difficulties and so the castle fell into disrepair with much of its fabric being appropriated. Even the deer were poached from its deer park. The ruins were purchased by the Catelyn family from Norwich in 1624. They managed to hold on to the castle during the Civil War. In 1702, Sir Nevill Catlin died there and his widow Mary carried the manor to her second husband Sir Charles Turner, 1st Baronet, of Warham who died in 1738.

In 1886 a Lord Berners sold the Castle to the Adair family. Lady Darrell, a descendant of Lord Berners, sold the castle in 1981 to a Mr. Wingrove. Two years later it was sold to a Mr. Gerald Fairhurst, who spent time in refurbishing it prior to its sale to a London businessman in 1987; and in 1989 it was again sold, this time to barrister Michael Lyndon-Stanford. During the change of ownership in the 1980s, the castle was viewed by several musicians who were interested in purchasing it, including Elton John and Johnny Rotten of the Sex Pistols, with one wag noting that "the de la Poles would surely be interested to know that Wingfield Castle was echoing again to the beat of heavy metal.” As it turned out, Wingfield wasn't bought by a rock musician. Nowadays it is privately owned and not open to the public.

The castle was the inspiration for Godsend Castle, the home of the Mortmain family in the 1949 novel I Capture The Castle by Dodie Smith.

== See also ==
- Castles in Great Britain and Ireland
- List of castles in England
