= William Stafford, 4th Earl of Stafford =

English noble

William Stafford
- 4th Earl of Stafford; 5th Baron Stafford
- Arms of Stafford: Or, a chevron gules
- Born: 21 September 1375
- Died: 6 April 1395 (aged 19)
- Buried: Tonbridge, Kent
- Noble family: Stafford
- Father: Hugh Stafford, 2nd Earl of Stafford
- Mother: Philippa de Beauchamp

William Stafford, 4th Earl of Stafford (21 September 1375 – 6 April 1395) was an English noble in the fourteenth century. He was the third son of Hugh Stafford, 2nd Earl of Stafford (c. 1344 – 16 October 1386); Hugh's second son Thomas inherited the earldom in 1390. He died in 1392, still childless, and the title passed to William. He was still a minor, however, in the wardship of Thomas, Duke of Gloucester, his dead brother's father-in-law, and the Stafford estates were administered by a ' group of senior officials and lawyers.' He was still so when he died on 6 April 1395 in Pleshey, Essex of natural causes. He was interred in Tonbridge, Kent. William also dying childless, the Stafford earldom descended to the next brother, Edmund, who became the fifth earl.

Peerage of England
Preceded by Thomas Stafford	Earl of Stafford; 1392–1395	Succeeded by Edmund Stafford
