= Michael de la Pole, 2nd Earl of Suffolk =

English nobleman and soldier (1367–1415)

Michael de la Pole
- Earl of Suffolk
- Arms of De la Pole: Azure, a fess between three leopard's faces or
- Born: 1367
- Died: 14 September 1415 (aged 47–48); Harfleur, Kingdom of France
- Family: de la Pole
- Spouse: Katherine de Stafford
- Issue: Michael de la Pole, 3rd Earl of Suffolk; William de la Pole, 1st Duke of Suffolk; Sir Alexander de la Pole; Sir John de la Pole; Sir Thomas de la Pole; Katherine de la Pole; Isabel de la Pole; Elizabeth de la Pole
- Father: Michael de la Pole, 1st Earl of Suffolk
- Mother: Katherine Wingfield

Michael de la Pole, 2nd Earl of Suffolk (1367 – 17 September 1415) was an English nobleman who supported Henry IV (reigned 1399–1413) against Richard II (reigned 1377–1399) during the turmoils of the late 14th century. He died during the Siege of Harfleur in 1415. He was the eldest son of Michael de la Pole, 1st Earl of Suffolk and Katherine Wingfield, daughter of Sir John Wingfield.

His father fled abroad amid accusations of treason during the Merciless Parliament in 1388, forfeiting the title of Earl of Suffolk and the family estates. Over the next decade the younger Michael de la Pole made vigorous attempts to recover these lands, and obtained most of them piecemeal between 1389 and 1392, following his father's death. However, his close association with the Lords Appellant, particularly the Earl of Warwick and the Duke of Gloucester prejudiced Richard II against him. He finally obtained the restoration of the earldom in January 1398.

While he obeyed the summons of the Duke of York to defend the kingdom against Henry Bolingbroke in July 1399, Suffolk did not object to the disbandment of York's army and consented to the deposition of Richard II in the summer of 1399. While the first Parliament of Henry IV technically upheld the forfeitures of the Merciless Parliament, Henry IV immediately restored de la Pole's estates and title in recognition of his support. However, he spent the remainder of his life trying to obtain possession of the remaining estates which had not been restored.

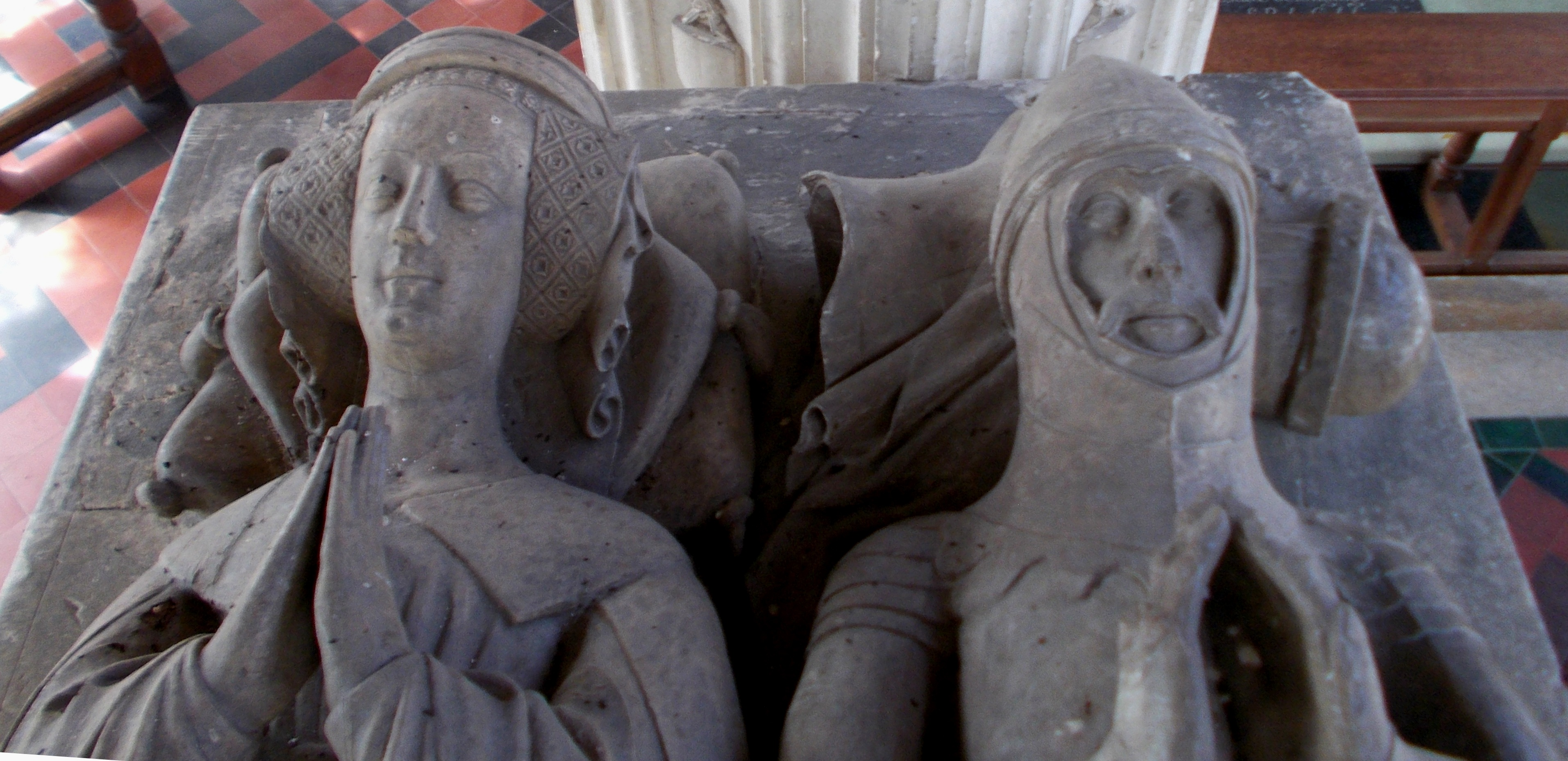
Katherine Stafford and Michael de la Pole

He played a relatively small role in national politics, although he regularly attended Parliament. He took part in the campaign in Scotland in 1400, in naval operations around 1405, and served as the senior English diplomat at the Council of Pisa (1409). Suffolk also acted as a lieutenant of the Duke of Clarence during his campaign of 1412–1413. However, he devoted most of his energies to re-establishing de la Pole influence in East Anglia. He took the role of a justice of the peace in Norfolk and Suffolk from 1399, and assembled a considerable following among the local gentry. He completed his father's building plans at Wingfield, Suffolk, and enlarged the local church.

Suffolk brought 40 men-at-arms and 120 archers with him on the 1415 campaign of Henry V in France. He died of dysentery at Harfleur, and was succeeded by his eldest son Michael, who later died at Agincourt.

== Issue ==
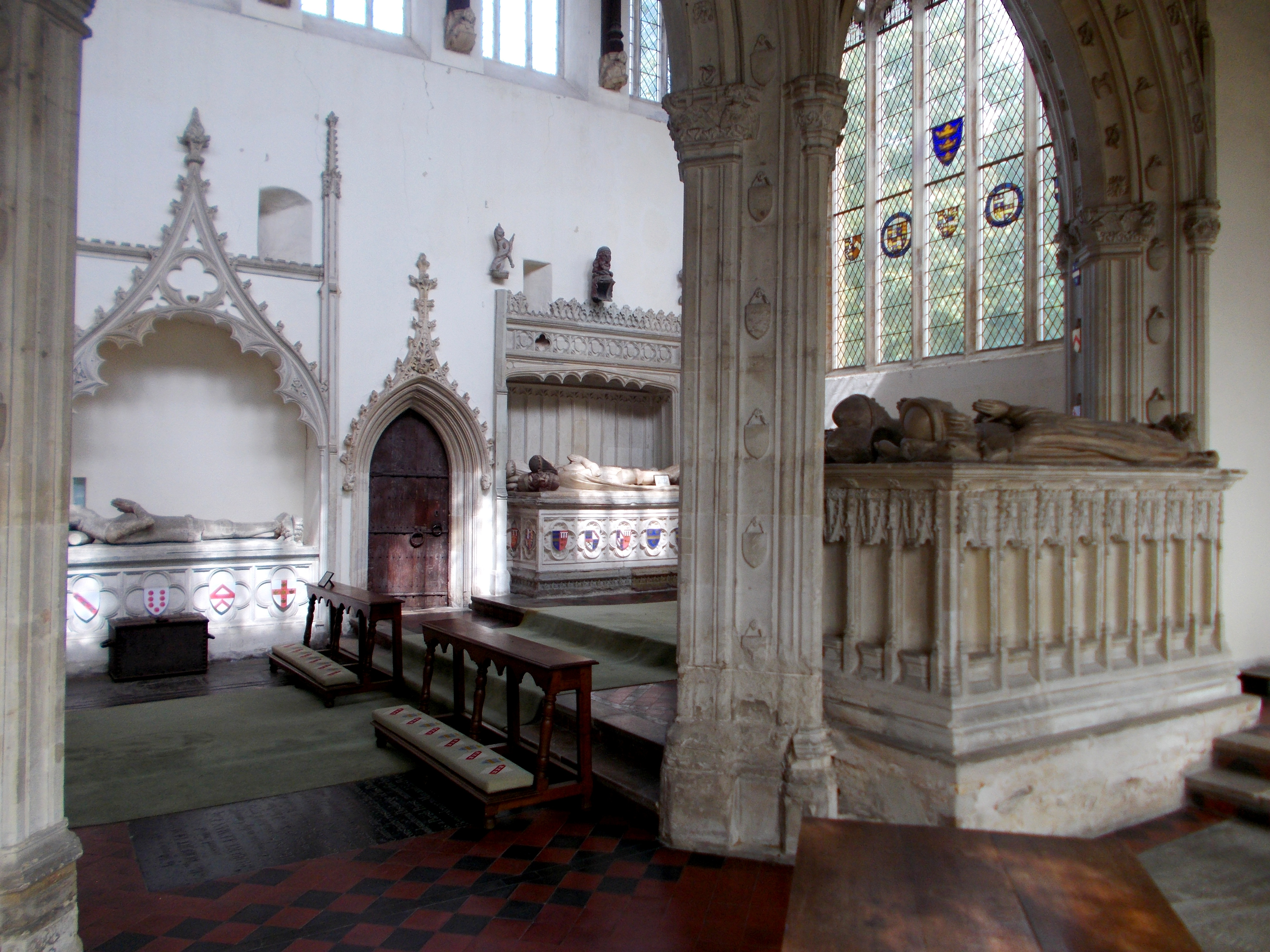
View into the chancel of Wingfield church, showing the Michael de la Pole monument foreground right.

Michael married Katherine de Stafford, daughter of Hugh de Stafford, 2nd Earl of Stafford. They were parents to at least eight children:

- Michael de la Pole (1394-1415), 3rd Earl of Suffolk
- William de la Pole (1396-1450), 1st Duke of Suffolk
- Sir Alexander de la Pole (died 1429). Killed at the Battle of Jargeau.
- Sir John de la Pole (died 1429). Died as a prisoner in France.
- Sir Thomas de la Pole (aft. 1397–1433). Died in France while a hostage for his brother William. He had a daughter
  - Katherine de la Pole (1416–1488, buried in Rowley Abbey, Oxfordshire), second wife of Sir Miles Stapleton.
- Katherine de la Pole (1410-1473), Abbess at Barking.
- Isabel de la Pole (died 1466), married Thomas de Morley, 5th Baron Morley.
- Elizabeth de la Pole, married (1) Edward Burnell, son of Hugh Burnell, 2nd Baron Burnell, and (2) Sir Thomas Kerdeston

Peerage of England
Preceded by Michael de la Pole	Earl of Suffolk; 1398–1399, 1399–1415	Succeeded by Michael de la Pole
