= Ralph Stafford (died 1385) =

Sir Ralph Stafford (c. 1367 – July 1385) was a knight of the royal household of King Richard II of England. He was murdered in 1385 by the king's half-brother, John Holland. One modern historian has suggested that Ralph was the closest friend the young King Richard II had at court; they were the same age and Ralph appears to have been "a bright and promising" courtier.

== Biography ==
Ralph was the eldest son and heir of Hugh Stafford, 2nd Earl of Stafford, and Philippa de Beauchamp, daughter of Thomas de Beauchamp, 11th Earl of Warwick. As a youth he grew up in the household of Queen Anne of Bohemia. One of the king's household knights, he accompanied the royal army on the 1385 invasion of Scotland. In July, he was murdered between York and Bishopsthorpe by Richard II's half-brother, John Holland. It is possible that Holland was acting in revenge for death of one of his squires, whom, it has been suggested had themselves been killed by an archer in Ralph's own retinue; it may even be that a scuffle had taken place and caused the deaths of two of the earl's more "intemperate" members of his retinue. Holland may have killed Ralph in a case of mistaken identity whilst trying to find the archer, not realising who Ralph was; although it could also have occurred after an exchange of insults. This affair, wrote the historian Carol Rawcliffe, "threatened to disrupt the entire campaign" and drew much commentary from political observers of the time.

Ralph Stafford had never married, and died childless, so the earldom passed to his younger brother, Thomas. The king, incensed with rage at Ralph's death had promised not to pardon Holland; Richard broke this promise, however in February 1386. Ralph's father, "embittered" at the king's failure to impose justice on the killer, embarked the same year on a pilgrimage to Jerusalem, and died on the return journey in 1386. Ralph Stafford was interred in Kings Langley Priory, Hertfordshire. The king, it has been said, lost one of the most important colleagues he had ever had; Ralph Stafford was "not only a close friend... [but also] a potential ally and courtier magnate".
