= Wulfhad and Ruffin =

Legendary 7th-century Christian martyrs

Saint Wulfhad and Ruffin of Stone
- Born: Mercia
- Died: c. 675; Stone, Staffordshire, England
- Feast: 24 July

Saints Wulfhad and Ruffin (or Wulfhade, Wulfad) were legendary 7th-century Christian martyrs from the royal family of Mercia. They were said to have been baptized by Saint Chad of Mercia, and their pagan father was said to have killed them at Stone, Staffordshire, England. Their feast day is 24 July.

== Butler's account ==
The hagiographer Alban Butler wrote the following account in his The Lives of the Fathers, Martyrs, and Other Principal Saints (1833),

July 24 – SS. Wulfhad and Ruffin, Martyrs THEY were two brothers, the sons of Wulfere, the king of Mercia, second brother and successor of Peada. Having been privately baptized by St. Chad, bishop of Litchfield, about the year 670, they were both slain whilst they were at their prayers by their father’s order, who, out of political views, at that time favoured idolatry, though he afterwards did remarkable penance for this crime. His father Penda had persecuted the Christians; but his elder brother Peada had begun to establish the faith in his dominions. Florence of Worcester says, Wulfere was only baptized a little before his death, in 675, consequently after this murder; but Bede testifies that he was godfather to Edelwalch, king of the West-Saxons, almost twenty years before. But either he relapsed, (at least so far as to be for some time favourable to idolatry,) or this murder was contrived, by some Pagan courtiers, without his privity, as Bradshaw relates it. The queen Emmelinda, mother of the two young princes, caused their bodies to be buried at Stone, which place took its name from a great heap of stones which was raised over their tomb, according to the Saxon custom. She afterwards employed these stones in building a church upon the spot, which became very famous for bearing the names of these martyrs who were patrons of the town, and of a priory of regular canons there. The procurator of this house, in a journey to Rome, prevailed on the pope to enrol these two royal martyrs among the saints, and left the head of St. Wulfhad, which he had carried with him, in the church of St. Laurence at Viterbo. (Leland, Collect. t. 1. p. 1. 2.) After this, Wulfere and his brother and successor Ethelred, abolished idols over all Mercia. See the acts of these royal martyrs in the History of Peterborough abbey, and Leland’s Itinerary and Collect. t. 1. p. 1. Also Cuper the Bollandist, t. 5. Julij. p. 571.(Butler 1833, p. 132)

== Legendary nature ==
The story of Wulfhad and Ruffinus, the supposed brothers of Saint Wærburh, is almost entirely fictional and may have been composed after the Norman Conquest (1066). Walter de Whittlesey, a monk of Peterborough Abbey, compiled and wrote an account of Saints Wulfhad and Ruffin, sons of King Wulfhere, who was supposed to have been the founder of Peterborough Abbey. A foundation charter of Peterborough Abbey dated 664 is in fact a forgery from the 12th century. Fabrications such as this to prove the ancient origin of a religious foundation were common at this time. According to the legend, Wulfhere murdered his sons because they had become Christians, and then repented and founded several monasteries.

The brothers were said to be enshrined in the Augustinian priory of Stone founded under King Henry I of England (r. 1100–1135) which may have replaced a church dedicated to Wulfhad. A 14th-century Vita (Life) from the Stone Priory claimed it was founded in Mercia in the early years of Christianity in England and said it held the relics of Wulfhad and Ruffinus, two sons of King Wulfhere of Mercia. However, Ruffinus is not a plausible name for a son of Wulfhere. Wulfhad is not mentioned in any of the late Anglo-Saxon material that describes the family of Wulfhere and his wife Eormenhild of Kent, and other early Mercian saints. The Domesday Book (1086) does not mention a minster at Stone. The story seems to have been created from an account by Bede of two princes from the Isle of Wight who were martyred at Stoneham in Hampshire.

== Sources ==
- An Account Of Saints Wulfhad And Ruffin, Sons Of King Wulfhere,..., British Library
- Butler, Alban (1833), The Lives of the Fathers, Martyrs, and Other Principal Saints: Compiled from Original Monuments and Other Authentic Records, Illustrated with the Remarks of Judicious Modern Critics and Historians, R. Coyne
- "Saint Wulfhad of Mercia", Catholicsaints
- Thacker, Alan (16 March 2020), "22 St Wærburh: The Multiple Identities of a Regional Saint", The Land of the English Kin, pp. 443–466, doi:10.1163/9789004421899_024
- Yorke, Barbara (2018), "IV Historical Background", Corpus of Anglo-Saxon stone sculpture (PDF), vol. 13 Derbyshire and Staffordshire, with a contribution by Philip Sidebottom
