= Eleanor de Bohun =

English noblewoman (c. 1366–1399)

- Duchess of Gloucester, Duchess of Aumale, Countess of Buckingham and Countess of Essex
- Arms of Eleanor de Bohun.
- Born: 1365 or 1366
- Died: 3 October 1399 (aged 32 or 33)
- Burial: Westminster Abbey, London
- Spouse: Thomas of Woodstock, Duke of Gloucester (m. 1376; died 1397)
- Issue more...: Humphrey, 2nd Earl of Buckingham; Anne of Gloucester; Joan, Lady Talbot; Isabel; Philippa
- Noble family: Bohun
- Father: Humphrey de Bohun, 7th Earl of Hereford
- Mother: Joan Fitzalan

Eleanor de Bohun (Note: (...) because of the number of sons born to the higher nobility in the late fourteenth and fifteenth centuries, (...) The emphasis on agnatic lineage was reflected in the fact that the woman kept her natal family name when she married and did not become fully a member of her marital kin.) (c. 1366 – 3 October 1399) was the elder daughter and co-heiress (with her sister, Mary de Bohun), of Humphrey de Bohun, 7th Earl of Hereford (1341–1373) and Joan Fitzalan, daughter of Richard FitzAlan, 10th Earl of Arundel, and his second wife Eleanor of Lancaster.

== Marriage ==
In 1376, Eleanor married Thomas of Woodstock, 1st Duke of Gloucester. Thomas was the youngest son of Edward III of England and Philippa of Hainault. Following their marriage, the couple went to reside in Pleshey Castle, Essex. According to Jean Froissart, Eleanor and her husband had the tutelage of her younger sister, Mary, who was being instructed in religious doctrine in the hope that she would enter a convent, thus leaving her share of the considerable Bohun inheritance to Eleanor and Thomas.

== Issue ==
Together Eleanor and Thomas had:

1. Humphrey, 2nd Earl of Buckingham (c. 1381/1382 – 2 September 1399)
2. Anne of Gloucester (c. 1383 – 1438) married (1st) Thomas Stafford, 3rd Earl of Stafford; (2nd) Edmund Stafford, 5th Earl of Stafford; and (3rd) William Bourchier, Count of Eu. Her son by 3rd marriage, John Bourchier, 1st Baron Berners, was grandfather of Richard Neville, 2nd Baron Latimer of Snape.
3. Joan (1384 – 16 August 1400) married Gilbert Talbot, 5th Baron Talbot (1383–1419). Died in childbirth.
4. Isabel (12 March 1385/1386 – April 1402), became a Minoress, later abbess, in a religious house near Aldgate
5. Philippa (c. 1388 - c. 1399) Died young

== Order of the Garter ==
Eleanor de Bohun was made a Lady of the Garter in 1384. She became a nun sometime after 1397 at Barking Abbey. Prior to her death, Eleanor divided her holdings among her children. She died on 3 October 1399 and was buried in Westminster Abbey. Her executors included the chaplain in Pleshy, Essex.

== In fiction ==
Eleanor appears briefly in Anya Seton's historical romance Katherine, based upon the life of Eleanor's sister-in-law Katherine Swynford, the third wife of John of Gaunt. She also appears in Act 1, Scene 2 of Shakespeare's Richard II, where she unsuccessfully urges John of Gaunt to avenge her murdered husband.

== Sources ==
- Castor, Helen (2025). The Eagle and the Hart: The Tragedy of Richard II and Henry IV. Simon & Schuster. ISBN 9781982139216.
- Dunn, Alastair (2003). The Politics of Magnate Power in England and Wales, 1389-1413. Oxford University Press. ISBN 9780199263103.
- Duggan, Anne; Ward, Jennifer C. (2000). Nobles and Nobility in Medieval Europe: Concepts, Origins, Transformations. Boydell & Brewer Ltd. ISBN 9780851158822.
- Ward, Jennifer C. (1995). Women of the English Nobility and Gentry, 1066–1500. Manchester University Press. ISBN 0-7190-4114-7.
- Ward, Jennifer C. (2013). English Noblewomen in the Later Middle Ages. Routledge. ISBN 9781317899150.
- Warner, Kathryn (2017). Richard II: A True King's Fall. Amberley Publishing. ISBN 9781445662794.
