= Humphrey, 2nd Earl of Buckingham =

English peer (1381–1399)

Earl of Buckingham
- Tenure: 9 September 1397 - 2 September 1399
- Predecessor: Thomas of Woodstock
- Successor: no heir

Humphrey, 2nd Earl of Buckingham (1381 – 2 September 1399) was an English peer and member of the House of Lords.

He was Lord High Constable of England. His father, Thomas of Woodstock, was the youngest son of King Edward III and the uncle of Richard II.

After the murder of his father, he became the ward of the crown, along with Henry of Monmouth (the future King Henry V), eldest son and heir of Henry Bolingbroke (the future King Henry IV). Richard II took both boys with him to Ireland in 1398, where they were left in custody at Kells, when Richard returned to face Bolingbroke. After Richard II was ousted, Henry Bolingbroke ordered their release and summoned them home, but Humphrey died on the way on 2 September 1399, due to illness. His mother Eleanor de Bohun died shortly after, allegedly due to sorrow over her lost son.

Peerage of England
Preceded by Thomas of Woodstock	Earl of Buckingham; 1397–1399	Extinct
