= Michael de la Pole, 1st Earl of Suffolk =

English financier

Michael de la Pole
- Arms of de la Pole: Azure, a fess between three leopards' faces or
- Born: c. 1330; England
- Died: 5 September 1389 (aged 58–59); France
- Occupation: Lord Chancellor
- Spouse: Catherine Wingfield
- Children: Michael de la Pole, 2nd Earl of Suffolk
- Parent(s): William de la Pole; Catherine Norwich

Michael de la Pole, 1st Earl of Suffolk, 1st Baron de la Pole, (c. 1330 – 5 September 1389) of Wingfield Castle in Suffolk, was an English financier and Lord Chancellor of England.

He benefitted from his father’s wealth and influence at Court. Also as his father-in-law was chief administrator to the Black Prince, de la Pole was initially part of his circle as well as being close to John of Gaunt, 1st Duke of Lancaster, under whose banner he fought. However later his contemporary Froissart portrayed his relationship with Gaunt as having cooled, due to de la Pole and the King favoring peace whereas Gaunt favored continuing war in Europe.

== Origins ==
He was the eldest son of Sir William de la Pole (died 1366), Chief Baron of the Exchequer, a wool merchant from Kingston upon Hull who, after the collapse of the Florentine banker families of Bardi and Peruzzi, emerged as the chief financier of King Edward III. His younger brother was Edmund de la Pole.

== Career ==
Michael enjoyed even greater popularity at court than his father, becoming one of the most trusted and closest friends of Edward's successor, Richard II. He was appointed Lord Chancellor on 13 March 1383 in succession to Robert Braybrooke, and created Earl of Suffolk in 1385, the first of his family to hold any such title (the earldom had become extinct in 1382 on the death of William de Ufford).

In the late 1380s his fortunes radically altered, in step with those of the king. During the Wonderful Parliament of 1386 he was impeached on charges of embezzlement and negligence, a victim of increasing tensions between Parliament and Richard. The embezzlement charge came after a convoluted situation whereby de la Pole had been taken prisoner whilst negotiating a marriage between Anne of Bohemia and Richard II. He, along with other English delegates, was taken captive by brigands in Germany, with John of Gaunt paying the ransom fee in 1380. When de la Pole returned to England, the exchequer paid his salary for the time he was prisoner. He had also received grants from the king, or had bought/exchanged royal lands at prices below their value. On other charges the lords declared that he ought not to be impeached alone, since his "guilt" was shared by other members of the council.

He was the first official in English history to be removed from office by the process of impeachment. Even after this, he remained in royal favor. Initially parliament wanted him imprisoned at Corfe Castle but the King ensured he stayed at Windsor although soon fell foul of the Lords Appellant. He was one of a number of Richard's associates accused of treason by the Appellants in November 1387.. As soon as the "Wonderful parliament" ended, the king remitted his fine and ransom and released him from custody. The king needed his advice and de la Pole was one of his wisest advisors. He accompanied the king on his progress through England, trying to gain support for the civil war which was seen to be imminent.

== Exile and death ==
After the Appellants' victory at Radcot Bridge (December 1387) and before the Merciless Parliament met in February 1388, de la Pole shrewdly fled to Paris, thus escaping the fate of Sir Nicholas Brembre and Chief Justice Robert Tresilian. He remained in France for the remainder of his life. Sentenced in his absence, his title and estates were stripped from him.

== Marriage and children ==
Arms of Wingfield: Argent, on a bend gules three wings conjoined in lure of the field, quartered by Michael de la Pole, 1st Earl of Suffolk

He married Katherine Wingfield (1340–1386) daughter and heiress of Sir John de Wingfield (d. circa 1361) of Wingfield Castle in Suffolk, chief administrator to Edward the Black Prince (father of King Richard II), by whom he had eight children:

- Michael de la Pole, 2nd Earl of Suffolk (1361–1415), a supporter of Henry IV and opponent of Richard. He regained his father's title on Henry's accession in 1399, and died at the Siege of Harfleur.
- Thomas de la Pole (1363–1415),
- William de la Pole (born 1365),
- Richard de la Pole (c. 1367 – 1402). He died without issue.
- John de la Pole (c. 1369 – 1415),
- Anne de la Pole (born c. 1373), widow of Sir Gerard de Lisle. Anne married secondly Robert Thorley, Esq. and their daughter, Margaret Thorley, married Reginald West, 6th Baron De La Warr. Thus, De la Pole was ancestor to Richard West, 7th Baron De La Warr who fought on the Lancastrian side in the Wars of the Roses and his son Thomas West, 8th Baron De La Warr (c. 1457 – 11 October 1525), a courtier and military commander during the reigns of Henry VII and Henry VIII.
- Elizabeth de la Pole (born c. 1377)
- Margaret de la Pole (born c. 1386)

== See also ==
- List of lord chancellors and lord keepers

== Notes ==
Political offices
| Preceded by Robert Braybrooke | Lord Chancellor; 1383–1386 | Succeeded by Thomas Arundel |
Peerage of England
| New creation | Earl of Suffolk; 1385–1388 | Succeeded by Michael de la Pole |
| New creation | Baron de la Pole; 1366–1388 | Succeeded by Michael de la Pole |
