= Anne of Gloucester =

Countess of Stafford (1383–1438)

- Countess of Stafford; Countess of Eu
- Born: 30 April 1383
- Died: 16 October 1438 (aged 55); Gloucester, Gloucestershire
- Burial: Llanthony Secunda Priory, Gloucester
- Spouse: Thomas Stafford, 3rd Earl of Stafford (m. 1390; died 1392) Edmund Stafford, 5th Earl of Stafford (m. 1398; died 1403) William Bourchier, Count of Eu (m. 1405; died 1420)
- Issue: Humphrey Stafford, 1st Duke of Buckingham; Anne Stafford, Countess of March; Henry Bourchier, 1st Earl of Essex; Eleanor Mowbray, Duchess of Norfolk; William Bourchier, 9th Baron FitzWarin; Cardinal Thomas Bourchier; John Bourchier, 1st Baron Berners
- House: Plantagenet
- Father: Thomas of Woodstock, 1st Duke of Gloucester
- Mother: Eleanor de Bohun

Anne of Gloucester, Countess of Stafford (30 April 1383 – 16 October 1438) was the eldest daughter and eventually sole heiress of Thomas of Woodstock, 1st Duke of Gloucester (the fifth surviving son and youngest child of King Edward III), by his wife Eleanor de Bohun, one of the two daughters and co-heiresses of Humphrey de Bohun, 7th Earl of Hereford, 6th Earl of Essex (1341–1373) of Pleshey Castle in Essex.

== Family ==
Anne was born on 30 April 1383 and was baptised at Pleshey, Essex, sometime before 6 May. Her uncle, John of Gaunt (third son of King Edward III), ordered several payments to be made in regards to the event.

Her father was the youngest son of Edward III of England and Philippa of Hainault. Her mother was Eleanor de Bohun, the daughter of Humphrey de Bohun, 7th Earl of Hereford, and Joan Fitzalan. Her mother was also a great-great-granddaughter of Edward I.

== Sole heiress and Countess of Buckingham ==
At the death of her brother Humphrey, 2nd Earl of Buckingham, in 1399, Anne was the co-heiress together with her two sisters Joan and Isabel, to his estates and titles. Anne became the sole heiress of the family's estate and titles in 1400, as one of her sisters, Joan, having died on 16 August 1400, and the other, Isabel, having become a nun.

She was subsequently recognized (and thereafter succeeded) as suo jure Countess of Buckingham, Hereford and Northampton as well as succeeding to the titles of Lady of Brecknock and Holderness.

Anne did not, however, use these titles, and instead styled herself as Countess of Stafford.

On Anne's death, in 1438, the title of Buckingham (as well as her other titles) passed to her son Humphrey Stafford, Earl of Stafford, who in 1444 was created Duke of Buckingham. This title remained in the Stafford family until the attainder and execution of Edward Stafford, 3rd Duke of Buckingham, in 1521.

== Marriage with Thomas Stafford, 3rd Earl of Stafford ==
Anne married three times. Her first marriage was to Thomas Stafford, 3rd Earl of Stafford (1368 – 4 July 1392), and took place around 1390. The couple had no children. After her husband's death, Anne married his younger brother Edmund.

== Issue of Anne and Edmund Stafford, 5th Earl of Stafford ==
On 28 June 1398, Anne married Edmund Stafford, 5th Earl of Stafford (2 March 1378 – 21 July 1403). They had three children together:

- Humphrey Stafford, 1st Duke of Buckingham, who married his second cousin, Anne, daughter of Ralph Neville, 1st Earl of Westmorland, and Joan Beaufort, Countess of Westmorland. Joan was a daughter of John of Gaunt, 1st Duke of Lancaster, and his third wife Katherine Swynford.
- Anne Stafford, Countess of March, who married Edmund Mortimer, 5th Earl of March. Edmund was a great-grandson of Lionel of Antwerp, 1st Duke of Clarence. Edmund and Anne had no children. She married, secondly, John Holland, 2nd Duke of Exeter (d. 1447), and had one son, Henry Holland, 3rd Duke of Exeter (d. 1475), and a daughter Anne, who married John Neville, 1st Baron Neville de Raby.
- Philippa Stafford, died young

== Issue of Anne and William Bourchier, Count of Eu ==
In about 1405, Anne married William Bourchier, 1st Count of Eu (d. 1420), son of Sir William Bourchier and Eleanor of Louvain, by whom she had the following children:

- Henry Bourchier, Earl of Essex. He married Isabel of Cambridge, daughter of Richard of Conisburgh, 3rd Earl of Cambridge, and Anne de Mortimer. Isabel was also an older sister of Richard Plantagenet, 3rd Duke of York.
- Eleanor Bourchier, Duchess of Norfolk, married John Mowbray, 3rd Duke of Norfolk
- William Bourchier, 9th Baron FitzWarin
- Cardinal Thomas Bourchier
- John Bourchier, Baron Berners. John was the grandfather of John, Lord Berners, the translator of Froissart

When her husband Bourchier died, she became the wealthiest woman in England.

Anne died on 16 October 1438 and was buried in Llanthony Secunda Priory, Gloucester.
