= John de Wingfield =

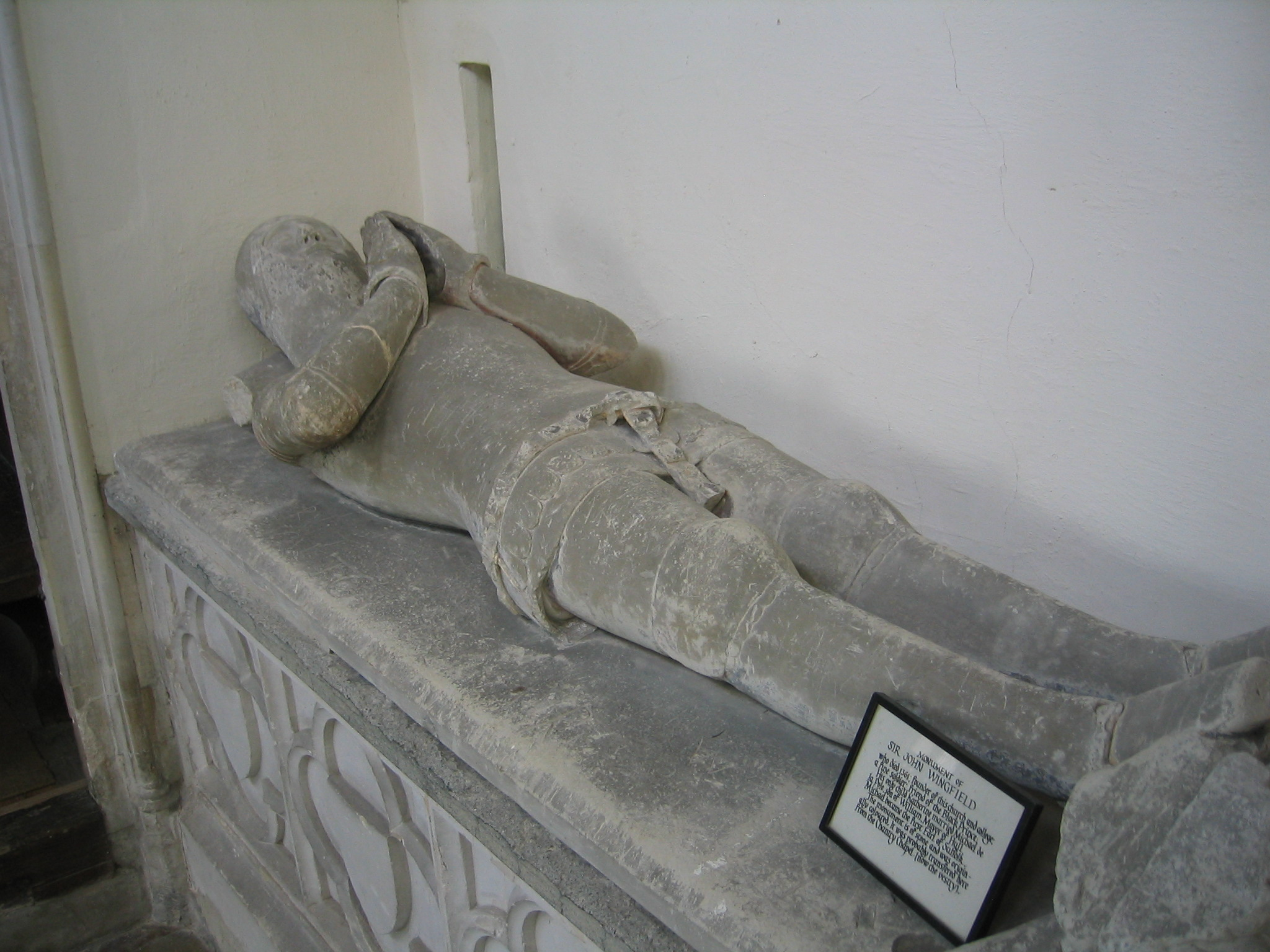
The Tomb of Sir John de Wingfield in St. Andrew's Church Wingfield, Suffolk

Arms of Wingfield: Argent, on a bend gules three wings conjoined in lure of the field, later quartered by de la Pole

Sir John de Wingfield (died c. 1361) of Wingfield Castle in Suffolk was chief administrator to Edward the Black Prince (1330-1376).

== Life ==
John and his brother Thomas fought at Crécy in 1346. John was with the English army in 1347 during the capture of Calais. He was appointed 'governor of the prince's business' (in effect business-manager) to Edward the Black Prince in 1351. In 1356 Wingfield fought at Poitiers capturing the head of the French King John II's bodyguard, Sire D'Aubigny. Edward III of England purchased this captive from Wingfield for 2,500 marks. Wingfield died in about 1361, possibly of the second outbreak of the Black Death.

His will provided for the founding of Wingfield College in 1362. The college was endowed by the Black Prince.

== Marriage ==
By 1330, John married Eleanor daughter of Thomas de Verlay of Saxmundham.

John had one daughter, Katherine Wingfield. Between 1358 and 1359, she married Michael de la Pole, son of Sir William de la Pole.

== Sources ==
- Given-Wilson, Chris (2002). The English Nobility in the Late Middle Ages: The Fourteenth-Century Political Community. Taylor & Francis. ISBN 9781134751426.
- Goodall, John A. A. (2001). God's House at Ewelme: Life, Devotion and Architecture in a Fifteenth-century Almshouse. Ashgate Publishing. ISBN 9780754600473.
- Martin, Edward A.; Bloore, Peter, eds. (2015). Wingfield College and Its Patrons: Piety and Patronage in Medieval Suffolk. Boydell Press. ISBN 9781843838326.
