= Edmund Stafford, 5th Earl of Stafford =

English noble (1377–1403)

Edmund Stafford
- 5th Earl of Stafford; Baron Audley
- Arms of Stafford: Or, a chevron gules
- Born: 2 March 1377
- Died: 22 July 1403 (aged 26)
- Buried: Austin Friars, Stafford
- Noble family: Stafford
- Spouse: Anne of Gloucester
- Issue: Humphrey Stafford, 1st Duke of Buckingham; Anne Stafford; Philippa Stafford
- Father: Hugh de Stafford, 2nd Earl of Stafford
- Mother: Philippa de Beauchamp

Edmund Stafford, 5th Earl of Stafford and 1st Baron Audley, KG, KB (2 March 1377 – 21 July 1403) was the son of Hugh de Stafford, 2nd Earl of Stafford, and Philippa de Beauchamp.

He inherited the earldom at the age of 18, the third of three out of four brothers to inherit the title. His eldest brother, Sir Ralph, died before inheriting the title and his other two elder brothers died without issue.

== Marriage and children ==
He married Anne of Gloucester on the 28th June 1398 as her second husband under special licence, as she was the widow of his brother Thomas Stafford, 3rd Earl of Stafford who had died prior to the consummation of his marriage at the age of 18. Edmund and his brothers were wards of the Gloucester family. Anne was the granddaughter of King Edward III by his son Thomas of Woodstock, 1st Duke of Gloucester and Eleanor de Bohun.

With Anne he had three children:

1. Humphrey Stafford, 1st Duke of Buckingham, who married Anne Neville, daughter of Ralph Neville, 1st Earl of Westmorland, and Lady Joan Beaufort. Joan was a daughter of John of Gaunt, 1st Duke of Lancaster, and his mistress, later wife, Katherine Roet. Had issue.
2. Anne Stafford, Countess of March (d. 20 September 1432), who married firstly Edmund Mortimer, 5th Earl of March. Edmund and Anne had no children. She married, secondly, John Holland, 2nd Duke of Exeter (d.1447), and had one son and a daughter: Henry, Duke of Exeter (1430 – 1475), and Lady Anne Holland (d. 26 December 1486).
3. Philippa Stafford, died young.

== Later life and death ==
He was made a Knight of the Bath, along with his younger brother Hugh, at the coronation of Henry IV and a Knight of the Garter in 1403.

He was killed by the Scotsman, Archibald Douglas, 4th Earl of Douglas, while fighting with the royalist forces of King Henry IV at the Battle of Shrewsbury on 21 July 1403. He was buried at the Church of the Austin Friars in Stafford.

== Shakespeare ==
The death of the earl at the battle of Shrewsbury is mentioned in Henry IV Part 1 but otherwise he is not in the play. "And thou shalt find a king that will revenge Lord Stafford’s death". Henry IV Part 1 Act 5 Scene 3 by William Shakespeare.

Peerage of England
Preceded by William Stafford	Earl of Stafford; 1395–1403	Succeeded by Humphrey Stafford
