= Thomas Stafford, 3rd Earl of Stafford =

Thomas de Stafford
- 3rd Earl of Stafford; 4th Baron Stafford
- Arms of Stafford: Or, a chevron gules
- Born: ca. 1368
- Died: 4 July 1392 (aged ca. 24)
- Noble family: Stafford
- Spouse: Anne of Gloucester
- Father: Hugh Stafford, 2nd Earl of Stafford
- Mother: Philippa de Beauchamp

Thomas Stafford, 3rd Earl of Stafford (c. 1368 – 4 July 1392) was the second son—but the senior surviving heir—of Hugh Stafford, 2nd Earl of Stafford and Philippa de Beauchamp, daughter of Thomas de Beauchamp, 11th Earl of Warwick. His elder brother, his father's heir, Sir Ralph Stafford, was murdered by Richard II's half-brother, the earl of Huntingdon whilst they were campaigning in Scotland in July 1385. As a result, Thomas became heir to the earldom of Stafford, and in 1390 he was knighted. He gained livery of his estates in 1391 and paid homage to the king for them on 20 October that year. He spent his short career campaigning in France alongside the duke of Gloucester.

Thomas Stafford married Anne, daughter of Thomas, Duke of Gloucester around 1390. He died on 4 July 1392 in Westminster, and was interred in Stone, with his father; his widow, Anne, with whom he had had no children, married his youngest brother Edmund Stafford, 5th Earl of Stafford.

Peerage of England
Preceded by Hugh Stafford	Earl of Stafford; 1386–1392	Succeeded by William Stafford
