= Thomas of Woodstock, Duke of Gloucester =

English prince and nobleman (1355–1397)

Thomas of Woodstock
- Duke of Gloucester, Duke of Aumale, Earl of Buckingham and Earl of Essex
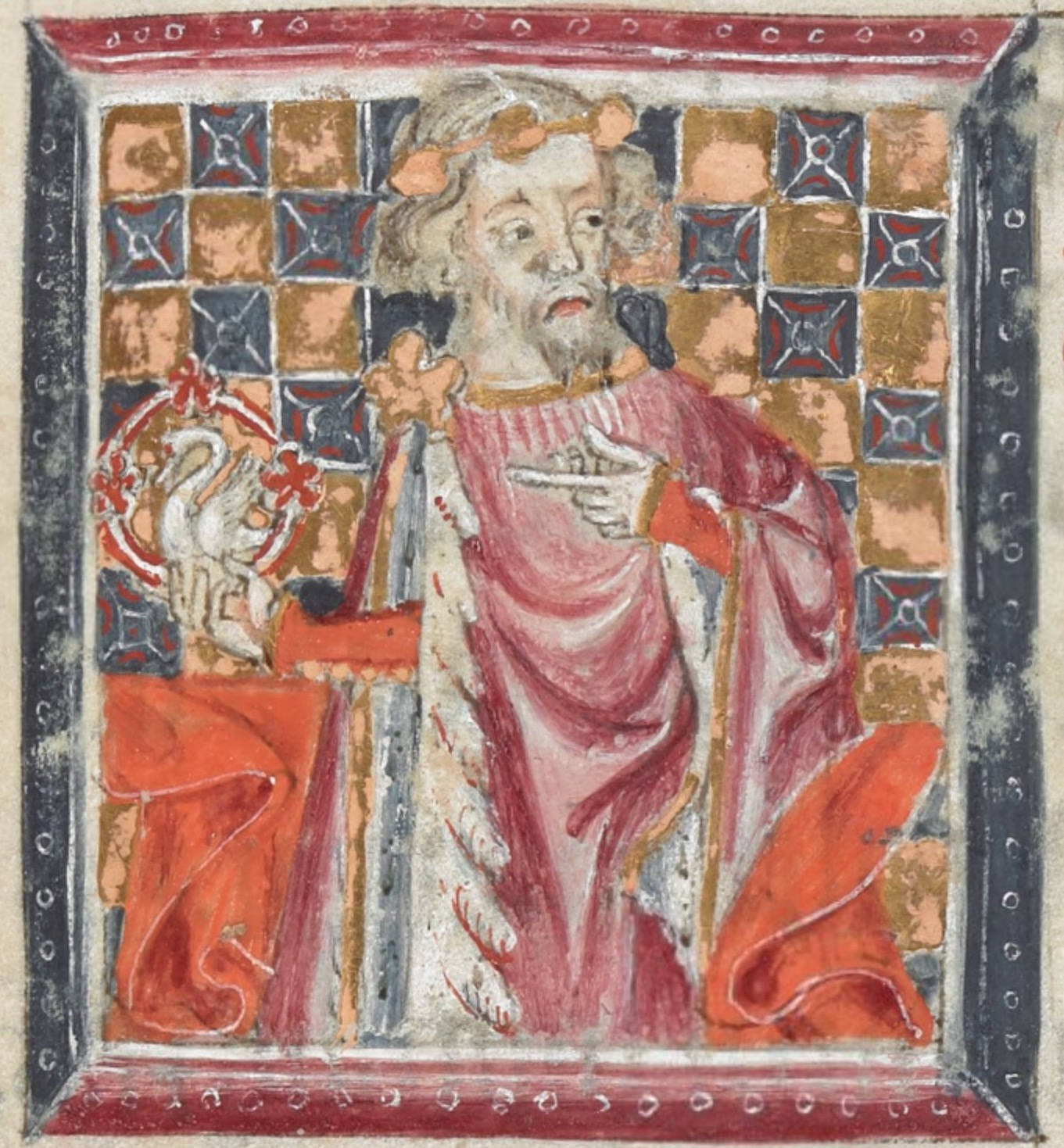
- Successor: Humphrey, 2nd Earl of Buckingham
- Born: 7 January 1355; Woodstock Palace, England
- Died: 8 or 9 September 1397 (aged 42); Pale of Calais
- Spouse: Eleanor de Bohun (m. 1376)
- Issue Detail: Humphrey, 2nd Earl of Buckingham; Anne of Gloucester; Joan, Lady Talbot; Isabel of Gloucester; Philippa of Gloucester
- House: Plantagenet
- Father: Edward III of England
- Mother: Philippa of Hainault

Coat of arms of Thomas of Woodstock: Royal arms of England (arms of his father King Edward III) with difference a bordure argent

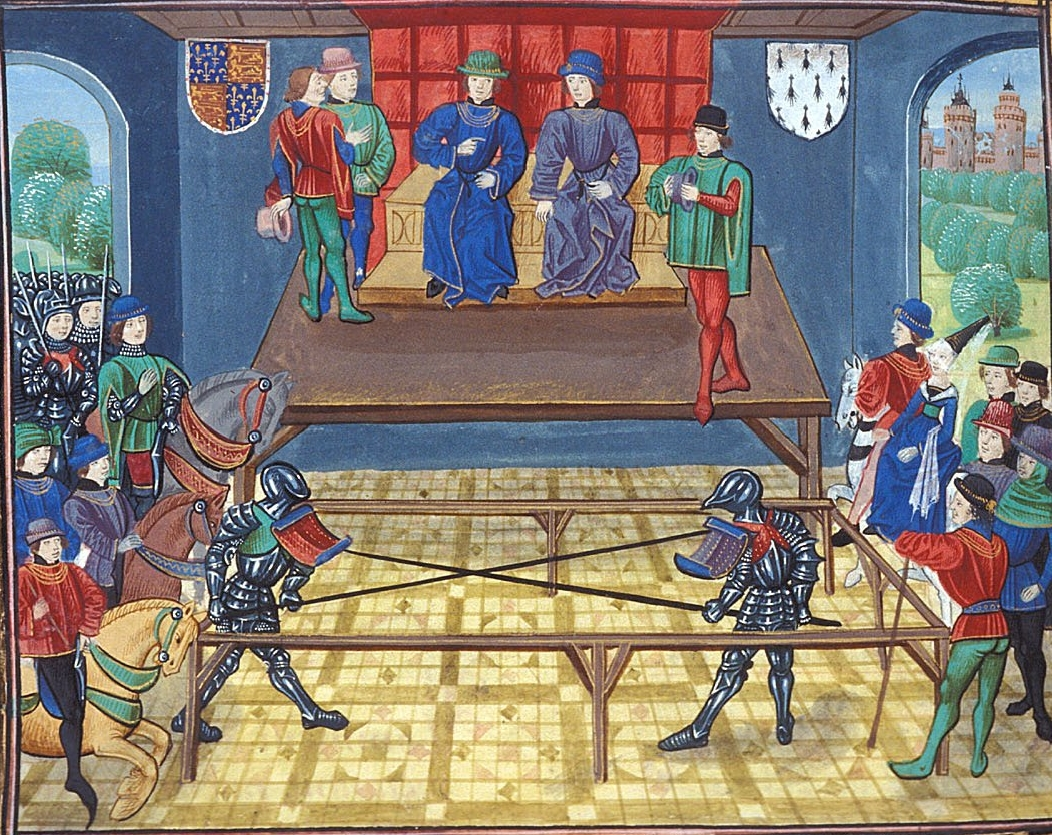
The Tournament of Vannes in 1381, overseen by Thomas of Woodstock and John V The Conqueror, Duke of Bretagne, KG.

Thomas of Woodstock, Duke of Gloucester (7 January 1355 – 8 or 9 September 1397) was the fifth surviving son and youngest child of King Edward III of England and Philippa of Hainault. He led the rebellion of the Lords Appellant against his nephew, King Richard II, in 1388. In 1397, he was accused of treason and imprisoned; while awaiting trial, he was assassinated, presumably on Richard's orders.

== Early life ==
Thomas was born on 7 January 1355 at Woodstock Palace in Oxfordshire after two short-lived brothers, one of whom had also been baptised Thomas. He married Eleanor de Bohun in 1374, was given Pleshey Castle in Essex, and was appointed Constable of the Realm, a position previously held by the Bohuns. The younger sister of Woodstock's wife, Mary de Bohun, was subsequently married to Henry of Bolingbroke, Earl of Derby, who later became King Henry IV of England.

In 1377, at the age of 22, Woodstock was knighted and created Earl of Buckingham. In 1378 his London home was broken into by a mob, which led to him getting a Charter for London government agreed the previous year revoked. On 22 June 1380 he became Earl of Essex in right of his wife. In 1385, he received the title Duke of Aumale, and at about the same time was created Duke of Gloucester.

== Campaign in Brittany ==
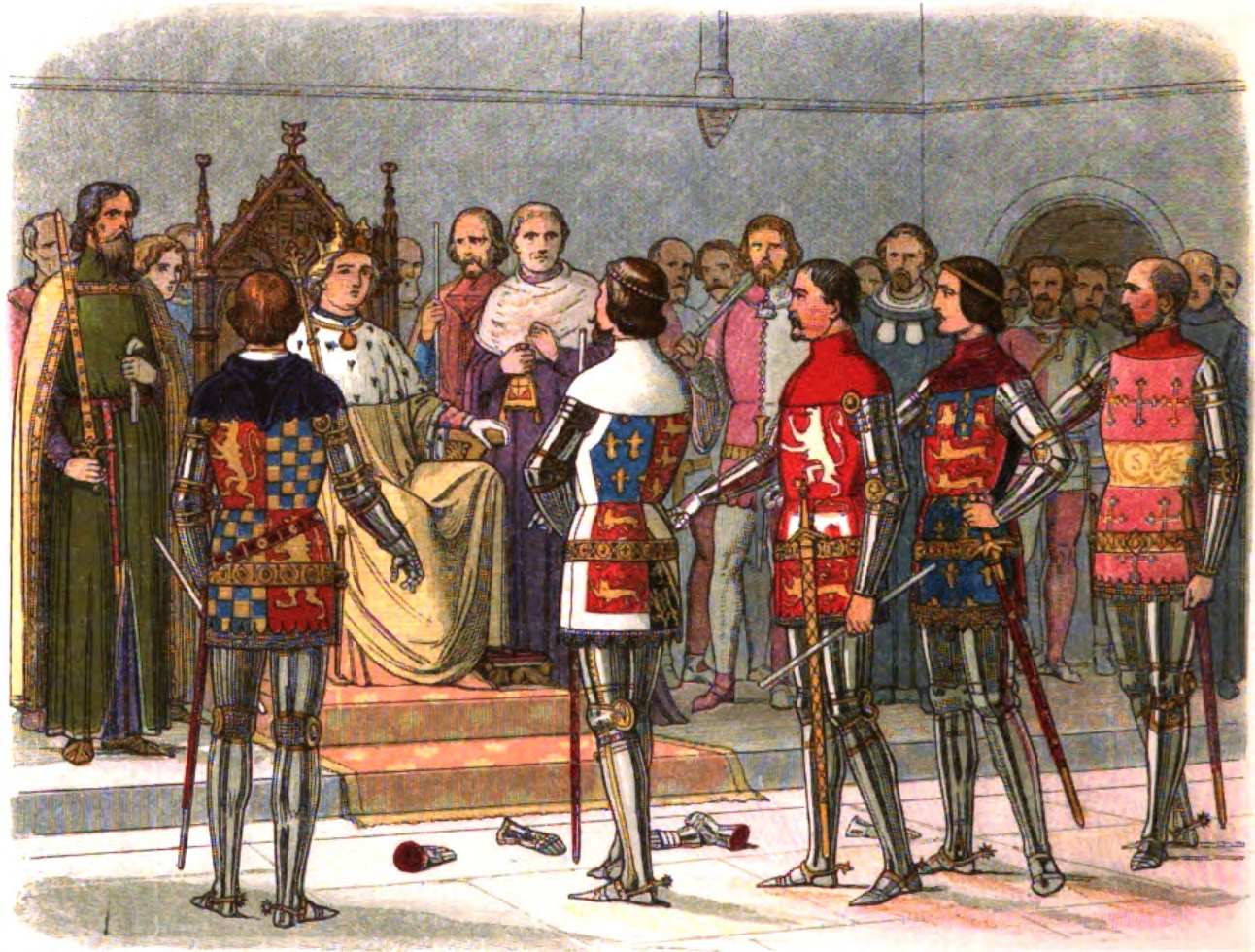
Richard FitzAlan, 11th Earl of Arundel; Thomas of Woodstock, Duke of Gloucester; Thomas de Mowbray, Earl of Nottingham; Henry, Earl of Derby (later Henry IV); and Thomas de Beauchamp, 12th Earl of Warwick, demand that Richard II let them prove by arms the justice of their rebellion

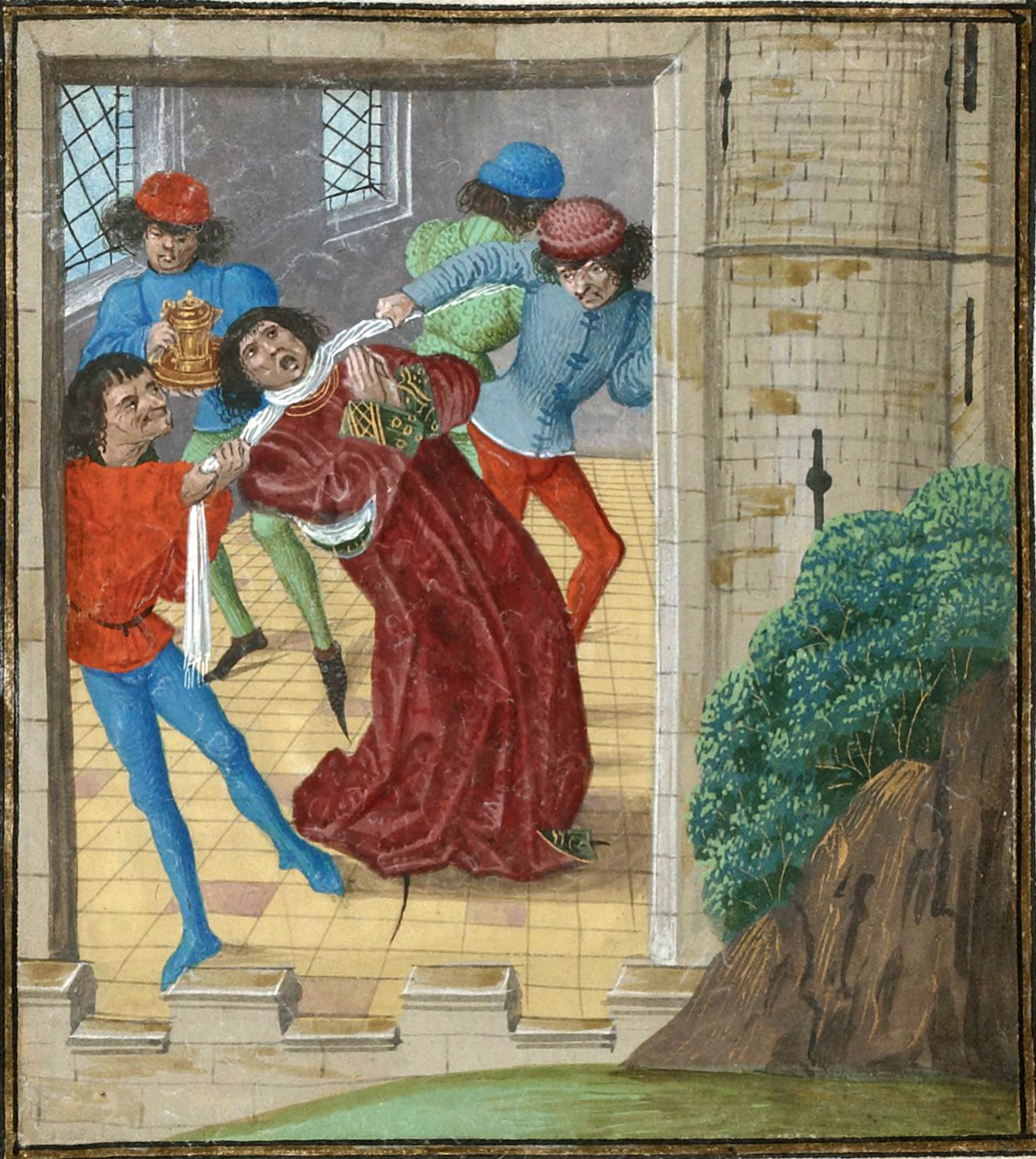
Murder of Thomas of Woodstock in Calais

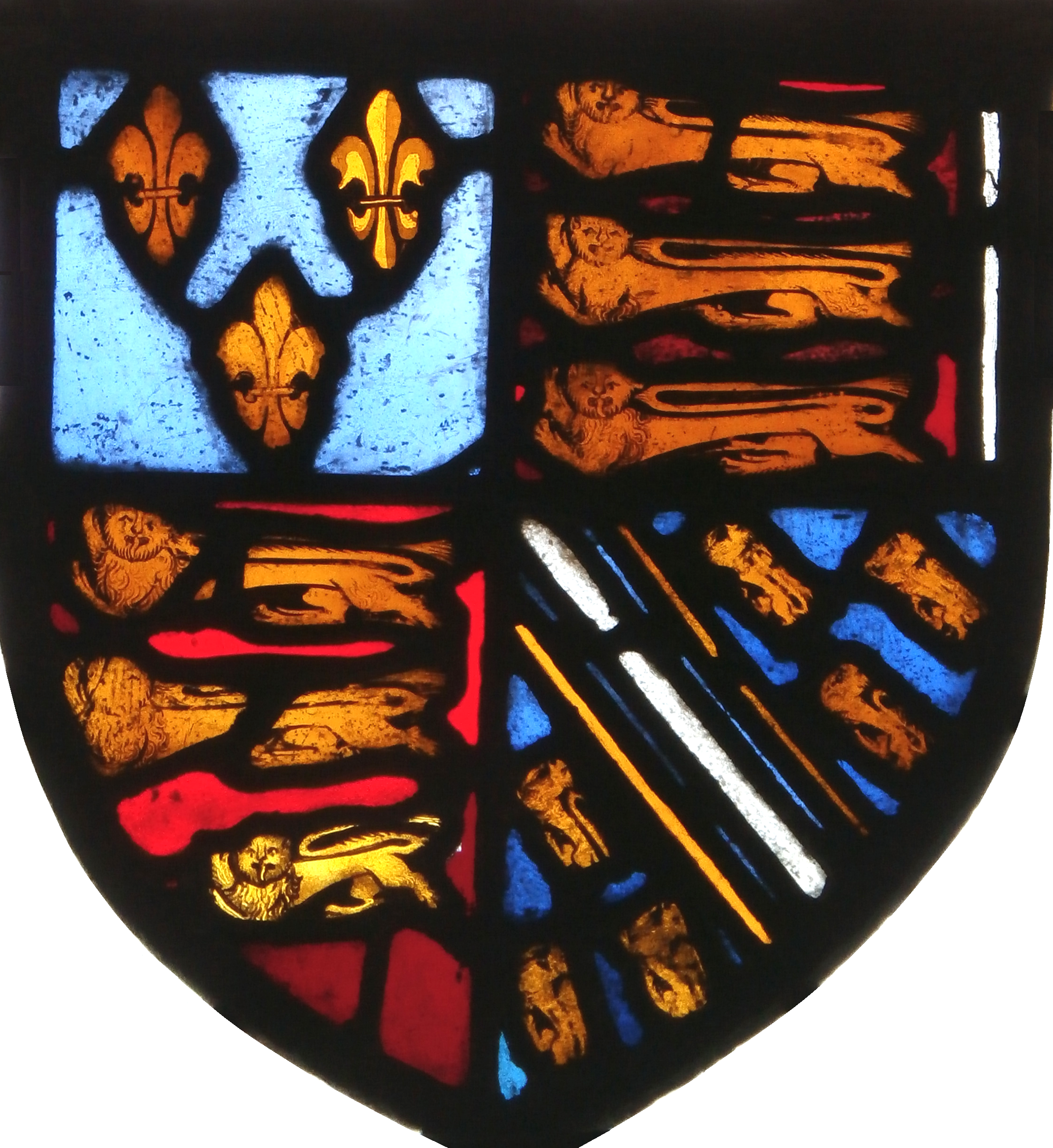
Arms of Thomas of Woodstock quartering arms of his father-in-law Humphrey de Bohun, 7th Earl of Hereford (1341–1373), father of his wife Eleanor de Bohun (c. 1366–1399). Royal Arms of England within the 4th quarter the arms of Bohun (Azure, a bend argent cotised or between six lions rampant or). 15th-century stained glass, west window, St Peter's Church, Tawstock, Devon. Tawstock was a seat of William Bourchier, jure uxoris Baron FitzWarin (1407–1470) (a descendant of Thomas of Woodstock's daughter Anne of Gloucester), who had married the heiress of Tawstock

Thomas of Woodstock was in command of a large campaign in northern France that followed the War of the Breton Succession of 1343–1364. The earlier conflict was marked by the efforts of John IV, Duke of Brittany, to secure control of the Duchy of Brittany against his rival Charles of Blois. John was supported in this struggle by the armies of the Kingdom of England, whereas Charles was supported by the Kingdom of France. At the head of an English army, John prevailed after Charles was killed in battle in 1364, but the French continued to undermine his position, and he was later forced into exile in England.

John returned to Brittany in 1379, supported by Breton barons who feared the annexation of Brittany by France. An English army was sent under Woodstock to support his position. Due to concerns about the safety of a longer shipping route to Brittany itself, the army was ferried instead to the English continental stronghold of Calais in July 1380.

As Woodstock marched his 5,200 men east of Paris, they were confronted by the army of Philip the Bold, Duke of Burgundy, at Troyes, but the French had learned from the Battle of Crécy in 1346 and the Battle of Poitiers in 1356 not to offer a pitched battle to the English. Eventually, the two armies simply marched away. French defensive operations were then thrown into disarray by the death of King Charles V of France on 16 September 1380. Woodstock's chevauchée continued westwards largely unopposed, and in November 1380 he laid siege to Nantes and its vital bridge over the Loire towards Aquitaine. However, he found himself unable to form an effective stranglehold, and urgent plans were put in place for Sir Thomas Felton to bring 2,000 reinforcements from England. By January, though, it had become apparent that the Duke of Brittany was reconciled to the new French king Charles VI, and with the alliance collapsing and dysentery ravaging his men, Woodstock abandoned the siege.

== Dispute with King Richard II ==
Returning to England in April 1381, Thomas of Woodstock found that his brother, John of Gaunt, had arranged a marriage between Thomas's sister-in-law, Mary de Bohun, and John's own son Henry Bolingbroke. The relations between the brothers, hitherto somewhat strained, were not improved by this event; presumably, Thomas was hoping to retain possession of Mary's estates. Still, having taken part in crushing the Peasants' Revolt in 1381, Thomas became more friendly with John, and in 1385 was created Duke of Gloucester. However, this mark of favour did not prevent him from taking up an attitude of hostility to his nephew, Richard II.

Thomas placed himself at the head of the party that was opposed to the royal advisers, Michael de la Pole, 1st Earl of Suffolk, and Robert de Vere, Earl of Oxford, whose recent elevation to Duke of Ireland had aroused discontent. Supported by those who were indignant at the extravagance and incompetence, real or alleged, of the king, Thomas was soon in a position of authority. He forced the dismissal and impeachment of Suffolk; was a member of the commission appointed in 1386 to reform the kingdom and the royal household; and took up arms when Richard began proceedings against the commissioners. Having defeated de Vere at the Battle of Radcot Bridge in December 1387 the duke and his associates entered London to find the king powerless in their hands. Thomas, who had previously threatened his nephew with deposition, was only restrained from taking this extreme step by the influence of his colleagues; but, as the leader of the "Lords Appellant" in the "Merciless Parliament," which met in February 1388 and was packed with his supporters, he took revenge upon his enemies, which culminated in a successful rebellion in 1388 that significantly weakened the king's power.

Richard II quickly regained control and eventually, in 1397, managed to dispose of the Lords Appellant. By 1396, Thomas and Richard were again at odds over policy. In 1397, Thomas was arrested at his home by the king himself and was imprisoned in Calais to await trial for treason. On 9 September 1397, he was murdered by being smothered between two feather beds, probably by a group of men led by Thomas de Mowbray, 1st Duke of Norfolk, and the knight Sir Nicholas Colfox, presumably on behalf of Richard II; parliament declared him guilty of treason and his estates forfeited. These events caused an outcry among the nobility of England that is considered by many to have added to Richard's unpopularity.

Thomas was buried in Westminster Abbey, first in the Chapel of Saint Edmund and Saint Thomas in October 1397, and two years later reburied in the Chapel of Saint Edward the Confessor. His wife was buried next to him.

== Marriage and progeny ==
Thomas married Eleanor de Bohun (c. 1366–1399), the elder daughter and co-heiress (with her sister Mary de Bohun) of Humphrey de Bohun, 7th Earl of Hereford (1341–1373). Thomas of Woodstock and his wife Eleanor had issue as follows:

- Humphrey, 2nd Earl of Buckingham (c. 1381 – 1399), died aged 18, unmarried and without issue;
- Anne of Gloucester (c. 1383 – 1438) who married three times:
  - Firstly to Thomas Stafford, 3rd Earl of Stafford, without issue;
  - Secondly to Edmund Stafford, 5th Earl of Stafford, the youngest brother of her first husband, by whom she had issue one son and two daughters;
  - Thirdly to William Bourchier, 1st Count of Eu (1374–1420), by whom she had issue, represented today by the Wrey baronets (heirs of the Bourchier Earls of Bath), who quarter the arms of Bohun, Bourchier and Thomas of Woodstock. (Note: As is visible on the monuments of Bourchier and Wrey in Tawstock Church in Devon)
- Joan (1384–1400), who married Gilbert Talbot, 5th Baron Talbot (1383–1419) and died in childbirth
- Isabel (12 March 1385/1386 – c.1421), a nun of the Order of Minoresses
- Philippa (c. 1388 - c. 1399). Died young.

As he was attainted as a traitor, his dukedom of Gloucester was forfeit. The title Earl of Buckingham was inherited by his son, who died in 1399 only two years after Thomas' own death. Thomas of Woodstock's eldest daughter, Anne, married into the powerful Stafford family, who were Earls of Stafford. Her son, Humphrey Stafford was created Duke of Buckingham in 1444 and also inherited part of the de Bohun estates.

The other part of these estates—including the Earldom of Hereford, which had belonged to Mary de Bohun and had then become incorporated into the holdings of the House of Lancaster—became a matter of contention in the latter 15th century.

== In literature ==
- Thomas of Woodstock's murder plays a prominent part in William Shakespeare's play Richard II, though he is dead at the time of the play's beginning.
- He also is the subject of Thomas of Woodstock, another Elizabethan drama by an anonymous playwright. Because of its stylistic affinities to Shakespeare's play, it is also called Richard the Second Part One.

== Sources ==
- Goodman, Anthony (1971). The Loyal Conspiracy: The Lords Appellant under Richard II. University of Miami Press.
- Ward, Jennifer C. (1992). English Noblewomen in the Later Middle Ages. Routledge.
- Ward, Jennifer C., ed. (1995). Women of the English Nobility and Gentry, 1066-1500. Manchester University Press.
- Weir, Alison (1999). Britain's Royal Families: The Complete Genealogy. London: The Bodley Head.

Thomas of Woodstock House of Plantagenet Born: 7 January 1355 Died: 8 September 1397
Political offices
Preceded by Humphrey de Bohun, Earl of Hereford and Essex	Lord High Constable; 1372–1397	Succeeded by Humphrey, 2nd Earl of Buckingham
Legal offices
Preceded by Robert de Vere, Duke of Ireland	Justice of Chester; 1388–1391	Succeeded by John Holland, 1st Duke of Exeter
Peerage of England
New creation	Earl of Buckingham; 1377–1397	Succeeded by Humphrey
