= Frances Howard, Countess of Surrey =

English noblewoman (c. 1517-1577)

Frances de Vere Howard, Countess of Surrey (née de Vere; c. 1517 – 30 June 1577) was the second daughter and third child of John de Vere, 15th Earl of Oxford, and Elizabeth Trussell. She first married Henry Howard, Earl of Surrey (executed for treason in 1547), and second Thomas Steyning.

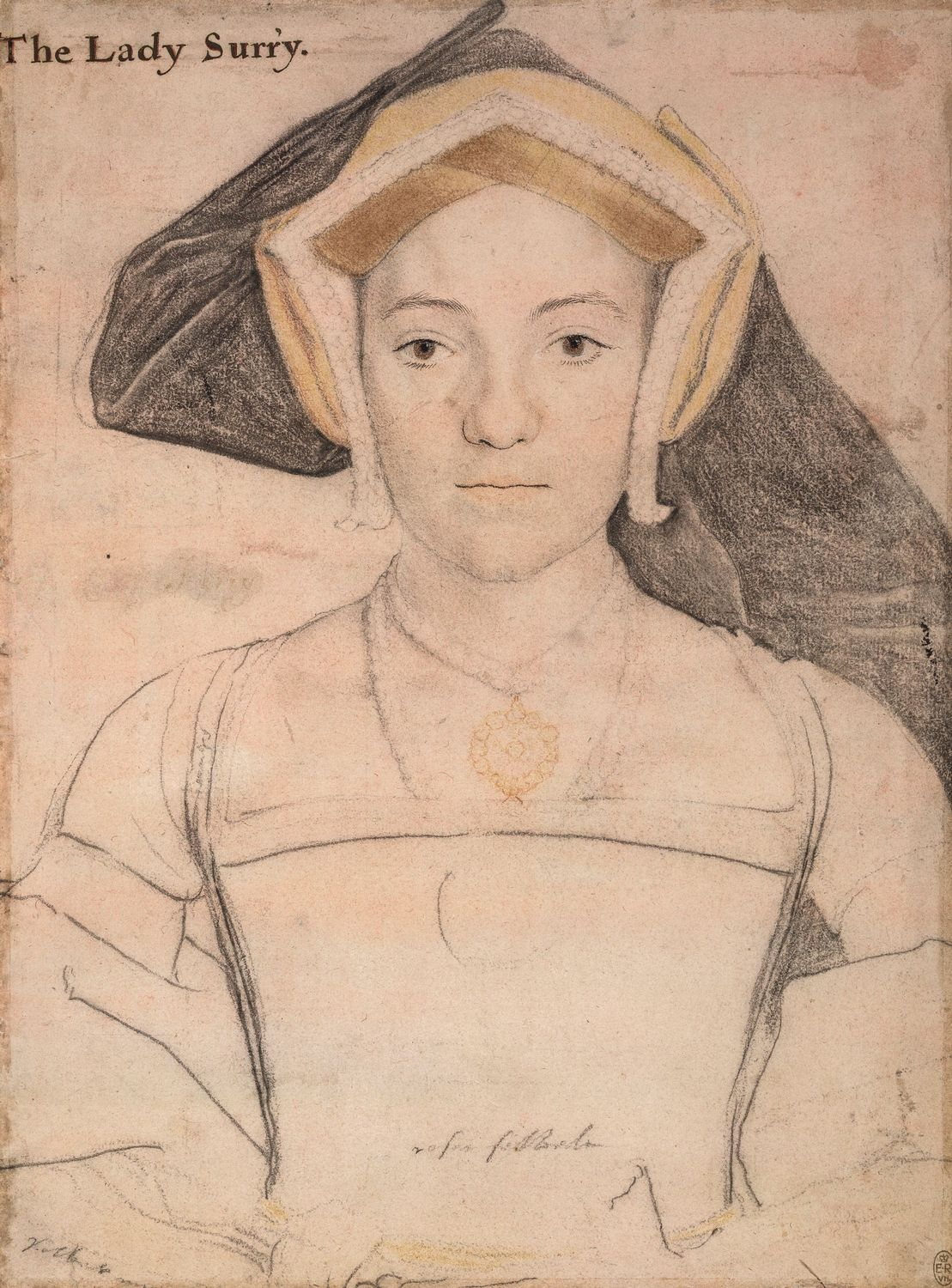
Frances Howard, Countess of Surrey, sketch by Hans Holbein the Younger, Royal Collection, Windsor Castle, c. 1535

Her father held the second oldest earldom in England, had solid landed interests and great influence at court, holding the hereditary title of Lord Great Chamberlain of England.

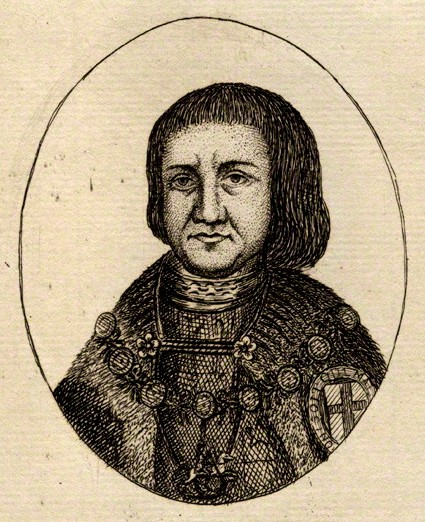
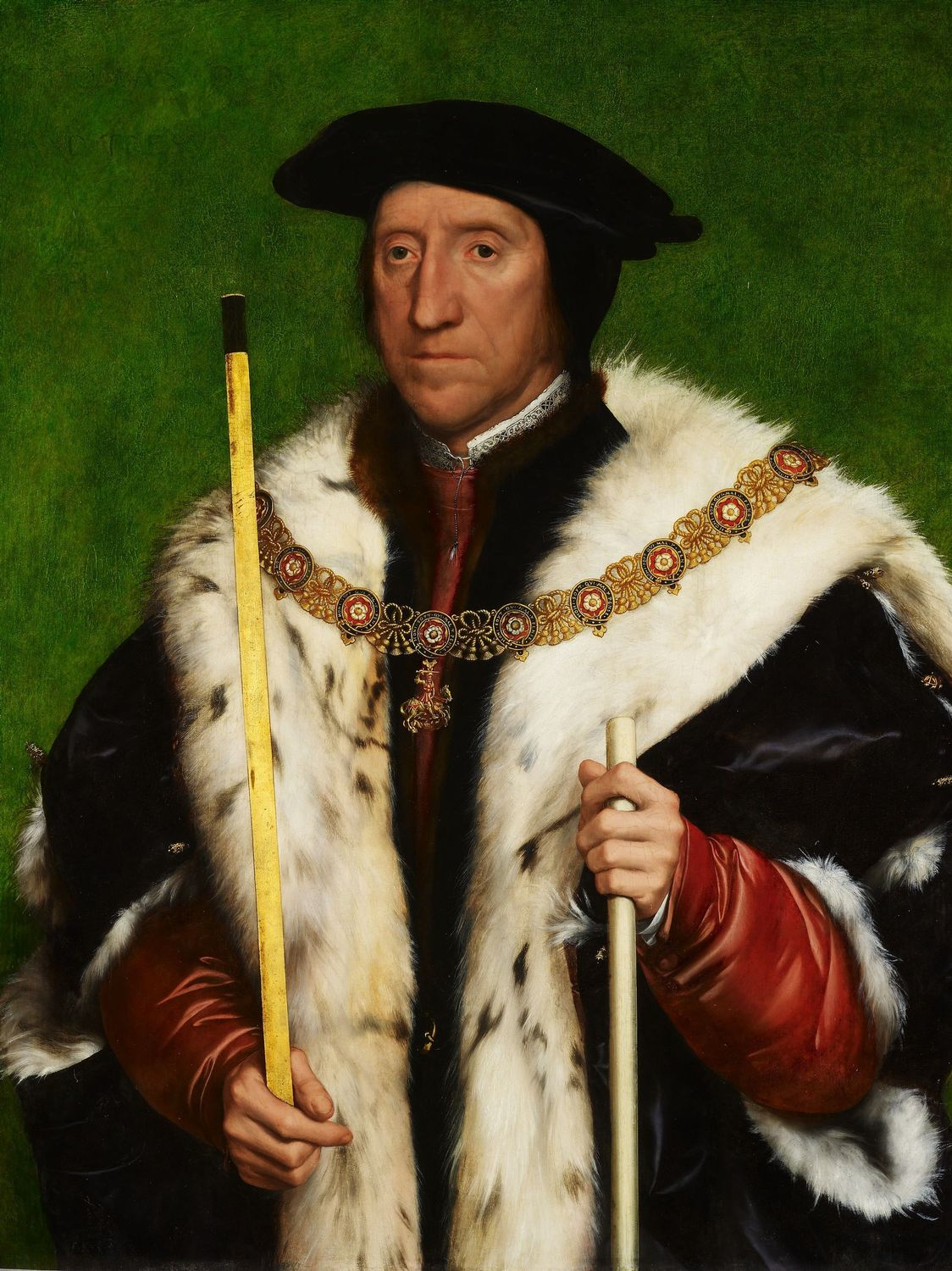
Frances' father John de Vere, 15th Earl of Oxford and father-in-law Thomas Howard, 3rd Duke of Norfolk

In April 1532, her father married her to Henry Howard, Earl of Surrey, the eldest son of Thomas Howard, 3rd Duke of Norfolk, and his wife Elizabeth Stafford, but due to both of them being only 14 years old, they did not live together until 1535. The Howard and de Vere families were repeatedly intertwined and had fought on different sides during the Wars of the Roses, with the de Vere family supporting the Lancastrians and the Howards backing the Yorkists. John de Vere, 13th Earl of Oxford had killed the Earl of Surrey’s great-grandfather at the Battle of Bosworth. Her father was an advocate of the New Religion, he was the first protestant earl of Oxford, and was popularly known as 'the good earl'. Whereas the Duke of Norfolk was the premier catholic nobleman of England. Once Henry VIII fell in love with Henry's cousin, Anne Boleyn, both father and son were sucked into the world of the Tudor court.

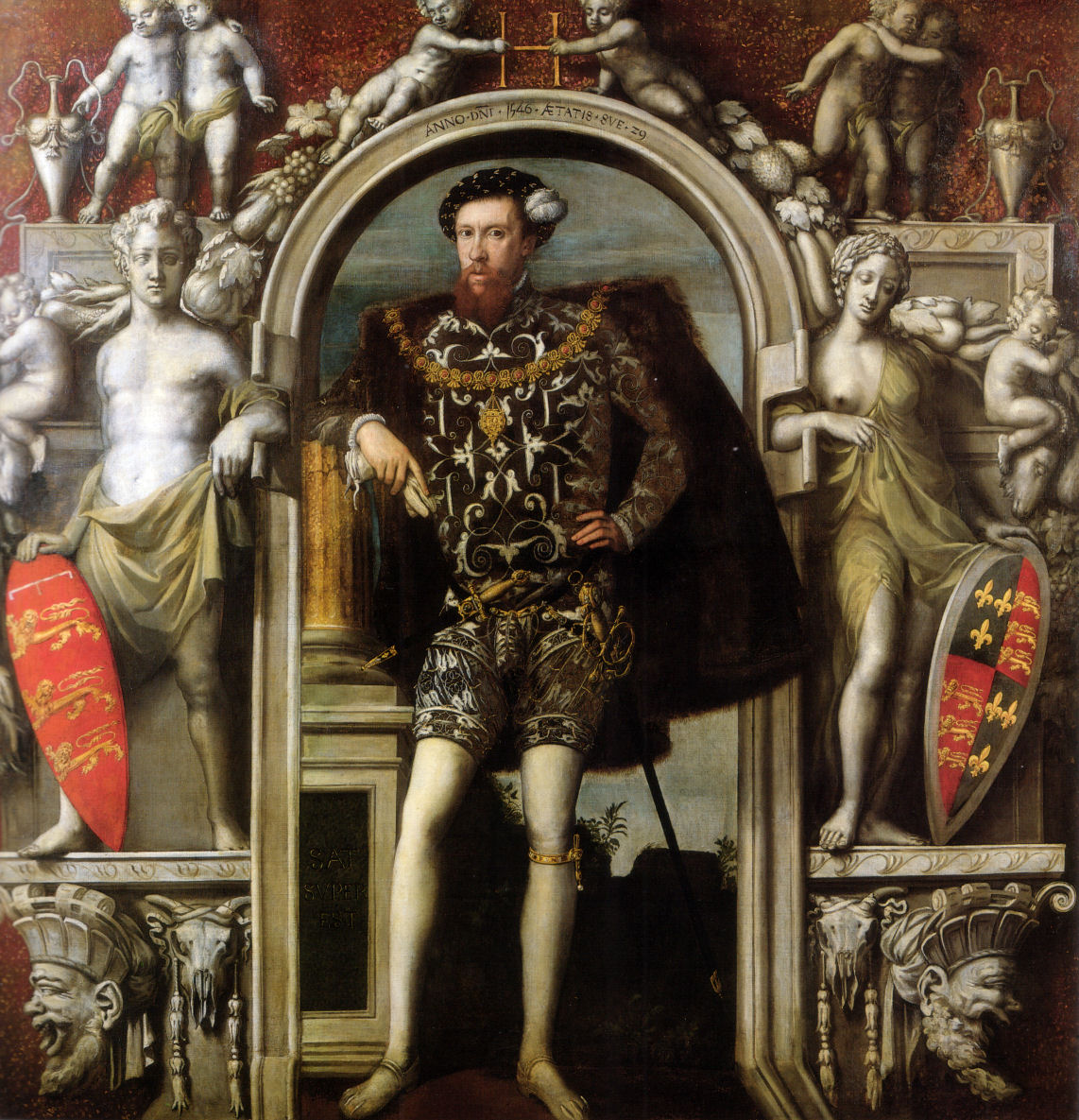
Frances' husband ‘The Poet Earl of Surrey’, 1546, a rare English Mannerist portrait by a Flemish immigrant.

In 1532 Frances husband traveled with poet Sir Thomas Wyatt to France accompanying Anne Boleyn (his first cousin), King Henry VIII, and the Duke of Richmond, staying there for more than a year as a member of the entourage of King Francis I of France. He took up a military career which culminated in his appointment in 1545 as commander at Boulogne, with the title of Lieutenant-General of the King on Sea and Land.

In 1536, Frances was one of the chief mourners in the funeral of Catherine of Aragon, with María de Salinas, Baroness Willoughby de Eresby, Elizabeth Browne, Countess of Worcester and Frances Grey, Duchess of Suffolk.

Frances and Henry had two sons and three daughters:

- Jane Howard, Countess of Westmorland (1533/1537 – buried 30 June 1593), who married Charles Neville, 6th Earl of Westmorland.
- Thomas Howard, 4th Duke of Norfolk (10 March 1536 – 2 June 1572), married (1) Mary FitzAlan (2) Margaret Audley (3) Elizabeth Leyburne.
- Henry Howard, 1st Earl of Northampton (25 February 1540 – 15 June 1614), who died unmarried.
- Katherine Howard, Baroness Berkeley (d. 7 April 1596) who married Henry Berkeley, 7th Baron Berkeley.
- Margaret Howard, Baroness Scrope of Bolton (b.1547) who married Henry Scrope, 9th Baron Scrope of Bolton.

Frances de Vere guaranteed her children were given a fine humanist education as they were tutored at the family’s castle in Kenninghall by the Dutch humanist Hadrianus Junius.

Henry Howard and his father Thomas Howard suffered with the fall from grace and execution in 1542 of their relative Catherine Howard, the king's fifth wife. Late in 1546, while Frances was expecting her fifth child (Margaret), her husband fell from favour, when he was charged with placing the arms of Edward the Confessor in the first quarter of his shield, an heraldic impropriety which was absurdly deemed to constitute a claim to the throne. His request for trial by combat was refused, and he was tried in Guildhall on 13 January 1547. He was accused of treason and, despite the lack of any real evidence, beheaded on Tower Hill on 19 January, a victim of court politics. He was the last man to be executed under King Henry VIII's reign, aged just 28. The 3rd Duke was saved by the death of Henry VIII; but he remained imprisoned in the Tower of London with most of his property and titles forfeit to the Crown.

Frances gave birth to her daughter Margaret after her husband’s execution.

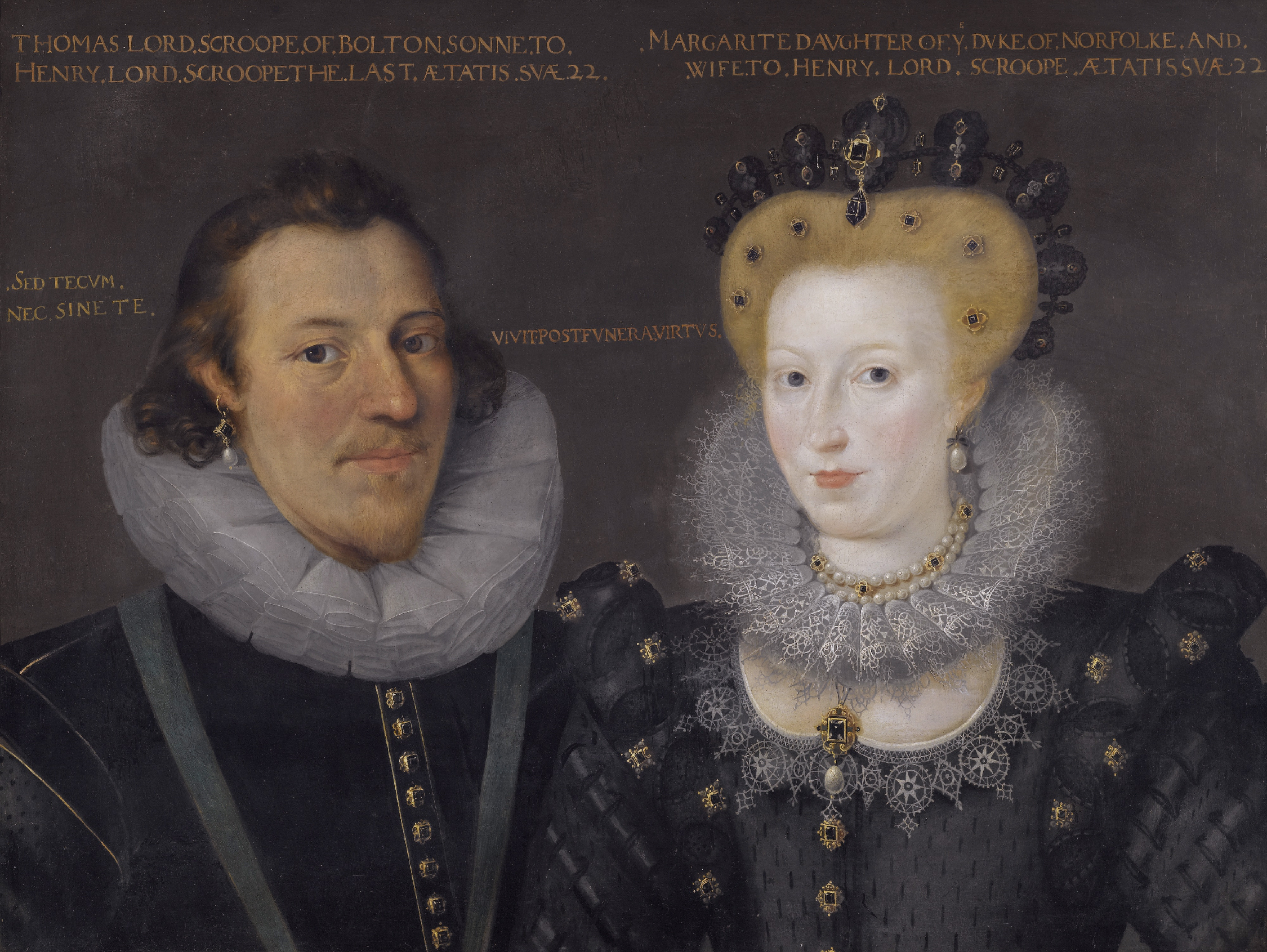
Frances' daughter Margaret with her son Lord Scrope, painting Englisch School, late 16th century

Her children were taken from her and placed in the care of Sir John Williams in the case of her eldest son, and in the care of Lord Wentworth in the case of the four younger ones. One year later, Jane, Thomas, Henry, Katherine and Margaret were allowed to live reunited under their aunt Mary FitzRoy, Henry's sister. Mary FitzRoy appointed protestant John Foxe, the famous martyrologist, and scholar Hadrianus Junius to educate the children. As soon as the 3rd Duke was released, he dismissed Foxe and reassigned the education of his heir to John White, bishop of Lincoln (1554–56).

Frances remarried 1553, to Thomas Steyning, by whom she had two children, Henry and Mary. Mary Steyning married Charles Seckford.

She lived in Suffolk until her death in 1577 and watched the fate of her five children from her first marriage more from a distance.

Frances' eldest son, Thomas Howard, succeeded his late grandfather of the same name at the age of eighteen in 1554. As a second cousin of Queen Elizabeth and one of England's richest landowners, he was one of Elizabeth's closest confidants. But like his father and grandfather, he also disappointed his sovereign, in his case Queen Elizabeth, by joining forces with Mary Stuart, formerly Queen of Scots and Queen of France and the pretender of the catholic feudal nobility at home and abroad to the English throne. He is even said to have been betrothed to Mary Stuart. And although Queen Elizabeth forgave him for his betrayal in 1570, he entered into an alliance with her enemies again shortly thereafter (Ridolfi plot). When he was again discovered plotting against the English queen, there was no more pardon. Frances therefore had to witness the execution of her son in 1572.

Her daughter Jane's husband, Charles Neville, the Earl of Westmorland, had also conspired against Queen Elizabeth in 1570 and had to leave England in a hurry because he could expect to be executed if he was caught. Jane did not follow her husband to the Spanish Netherlands, but remained in England.

Frances' and Henry's second son Henry, the Earl of Northampton, also corresponded with the Scottish queen. However, he got off with a prison sentence. By 1600, he was again among the leading advisors to the next English king, James I.

Frances de Vere died 1577 at Earl Soham, in the neighbouring village to Framlingham, Suffolk. In 1614 her son Henry had a monument erected in St Michael the Archangel's Church, Framlingham for his father, in which he placed not only his remains but also those of his grandfather and mother. Frances rests beside her husband with the blue boar of the de Veres at her feet.

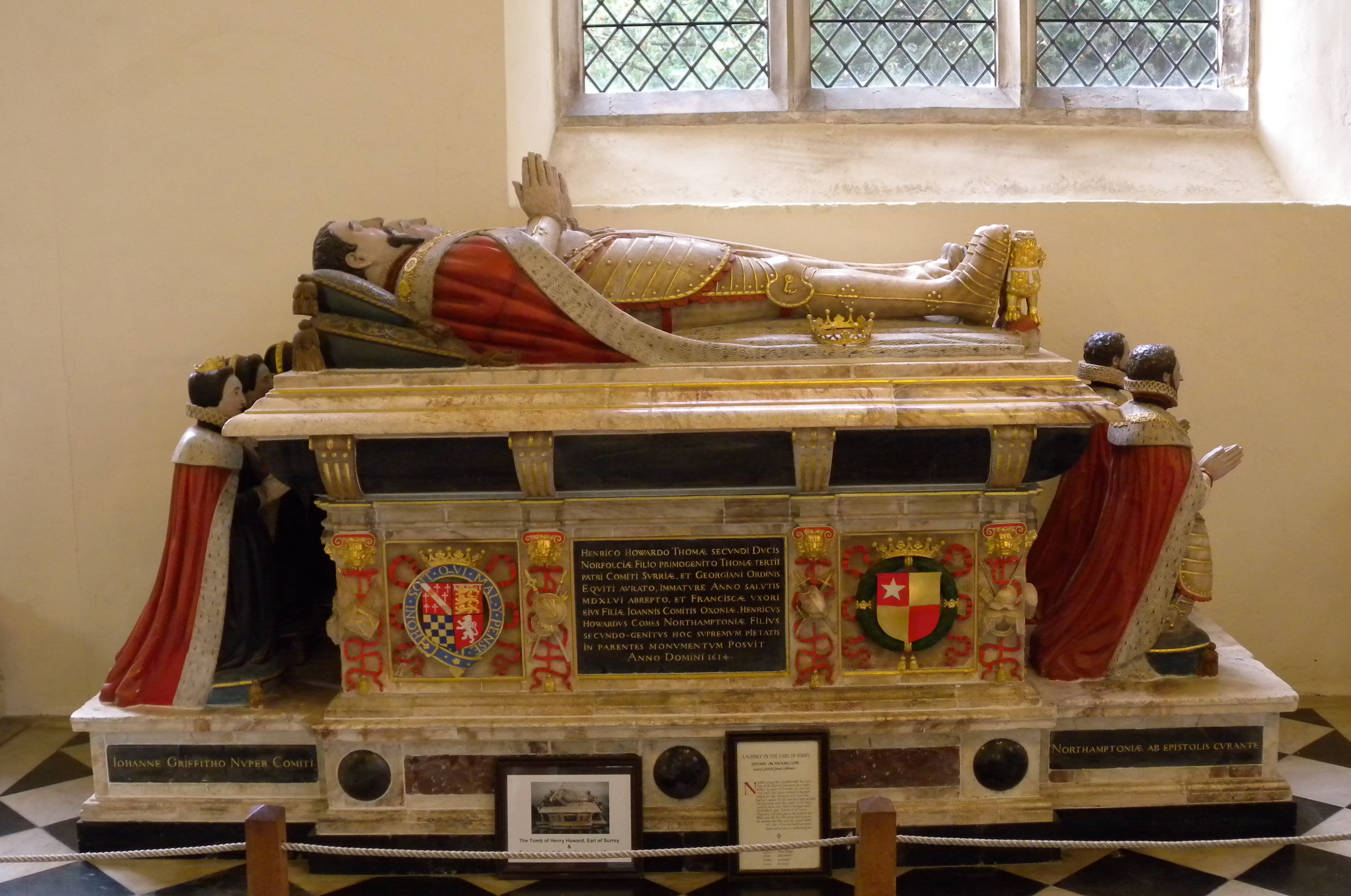
Tomb of Henry Howard and Frances de Vere displaying the Howard and De Vere families coats of arms. Their two sons and three daughters kneel at the Head and foot of the tomb. Painted alabaster, 1614
