= Seckford =

Seckford is a surname. Notable people with the surname include:

- Charles Seckford (1551–1592), English politician
- Thomas Seckford (1515–1587), English MP for Orford
