= Henry Howard, Earl of Surrey =

English poet (1516/17–1547)

Earl of Surrey
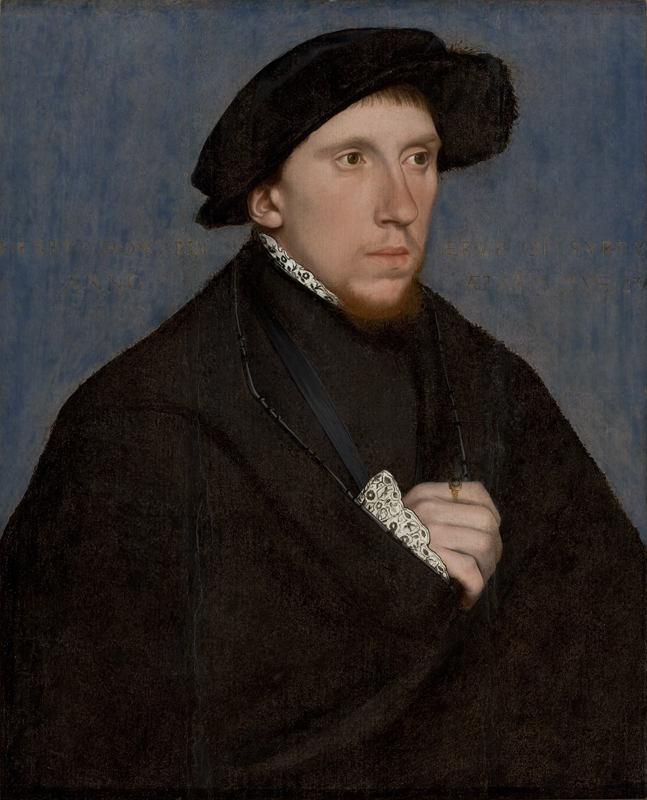
- Portrait, c. 1542

Personal details
- Born: c. 1516 or 1517 Hunsdon, Hertfordshire, England
- Died: 19 January 1547 (aged 29 or 30) Tower Hill, London, England
- Cause of death: Execution
- Resting place: First at the Church of All Hallows, Tower Street, London and then at Church of St Michael the Archangel, Framlingham, Suffolk
- Spouse: Frances de Vere
- Children: Thomas Howard, 4th Duke of Norfolk; Henry Howard, 1st Earl of Northampton; Jane Howard, Countess of Westmorland; Katherine Howard, Lady Berkeley; Margaret Howard, Lady Scrope
- Parent(s): Thomas Howard, 3rd Duke of Norfolk; Lady Elizabeth Stafford
- Religion: Roman Catholicism
- Writing career
- Language: Early Modern English
- Genres: Sonnet; song; translation
- Movements: English Renaissance, Petrarchism

Henry Howard, Earl of Surrey (1516/1517 – 19 January 1547), was an English nobleman, politician and poet. He was one of the founders of English Renaissance poetry and was the last known person to have been executed at the insistence of King Henry VIII. As a fellow translator and imitator of classical Latin authors, his name is closely linked in literature with that of the poet Sir Thomas Wyatt, about whom he wrote an elegy, the only poem published in his life. Owing largely to the powerful position of his father Thomas Howard, 3rd Duke of Norfolk, Henry took a prominent part in court life, and served as a soldier both in France and in Scotland. He was a man of reckless temper, which involved him in many quarrels, and finally brought upon him the wrath of the ageing Henry VIII. He was arrested, tried for treason and beheaded on Tower Hill.

Howard, along with Thomas Wyatt, is regarded as a pioneer of the English sonnet. Notable sonnets by him include "Alas, so all things now do hold their peace", "Set me where as the sun doth parch the green" and "The soote season, that bud and bloom forth brings".

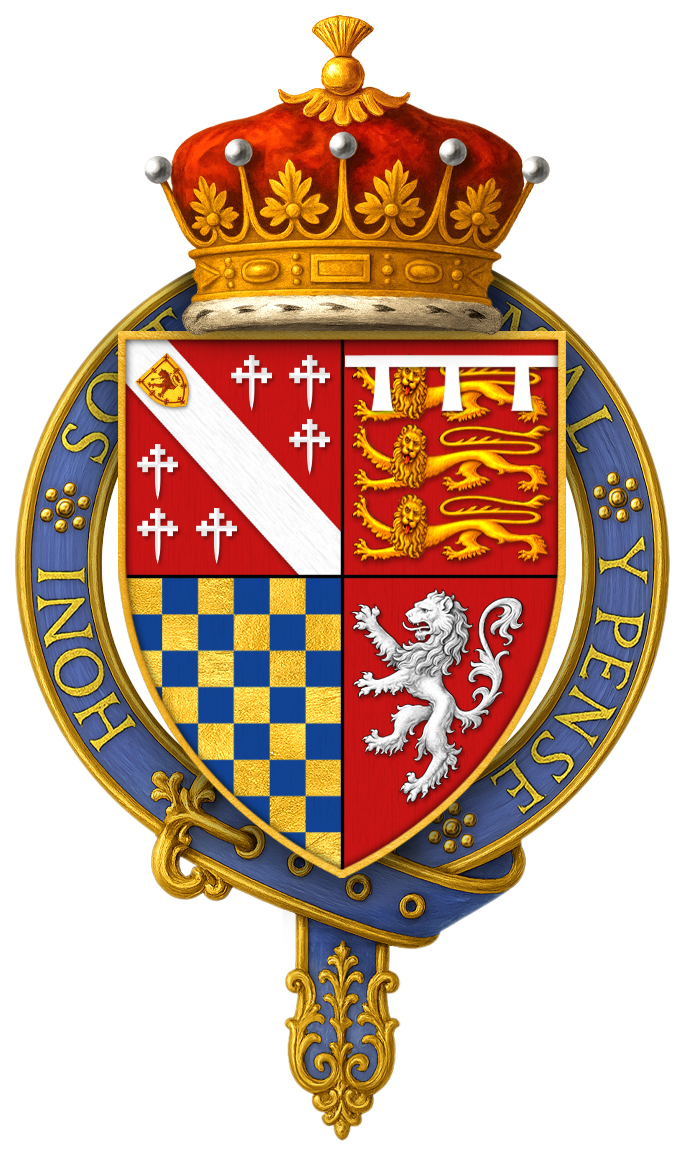
Arms of Henry Howard, Earl of Surrey, KG: Quarterly of 4: 1: Gules, on a bend between six cross-crosslets fitchy argent an escutcheon or charged with a demi-lion rampant pierced through the mouth by an arrow within a double tressure flory counterflory of the first (Howard, with augmentation of honour); 2: Gules, three lions passant guardant in pale or armed and langued azure a label of three points argent (Plantagenet, arms of Thomas of Brotherton, 1st Earl of Norfolk); 3: Chequy or and azure (de Warenne, Earl of Surrey); 4: Gules, a lion rampant argent (Mowbray)

== Origins ==
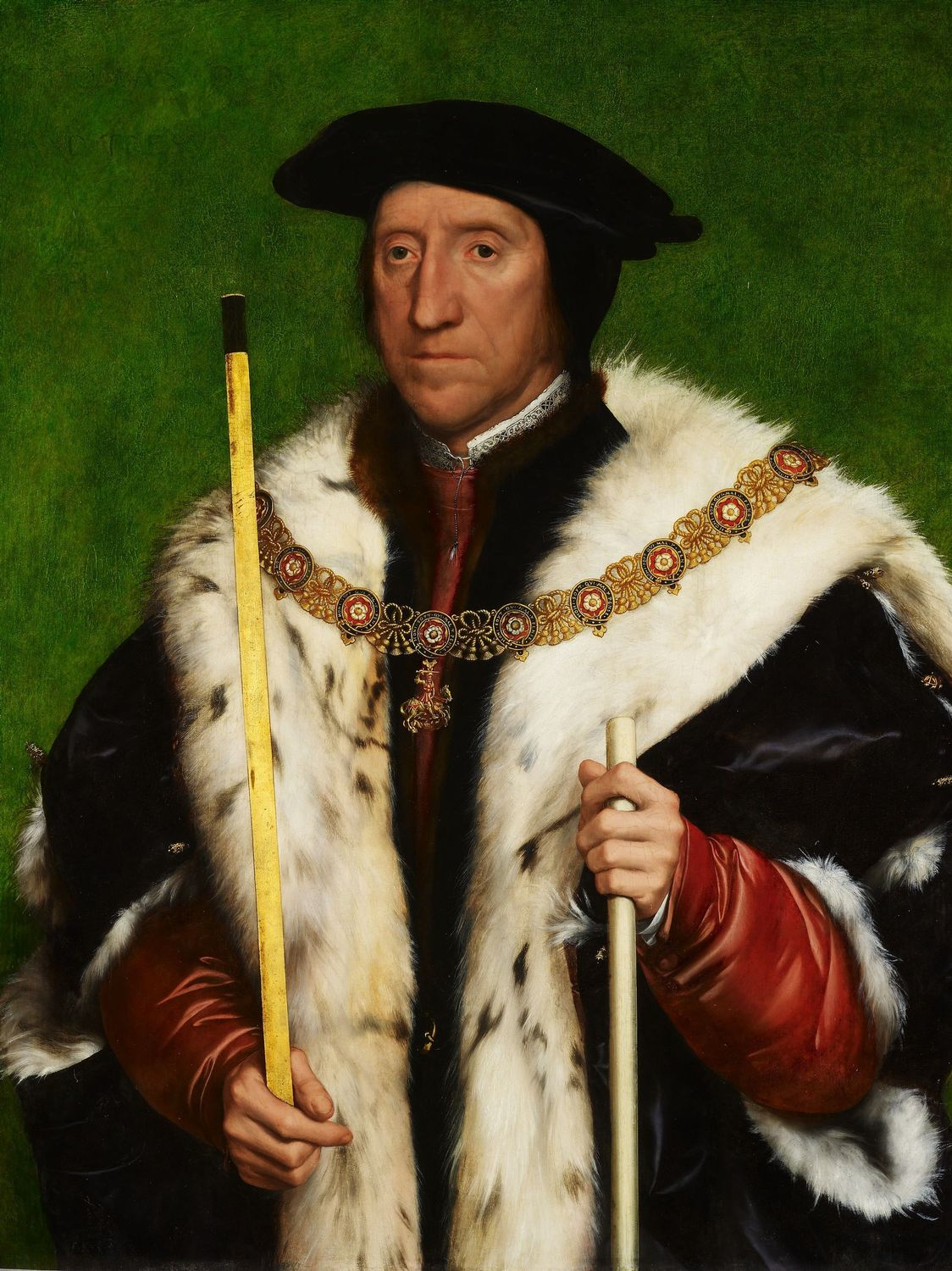
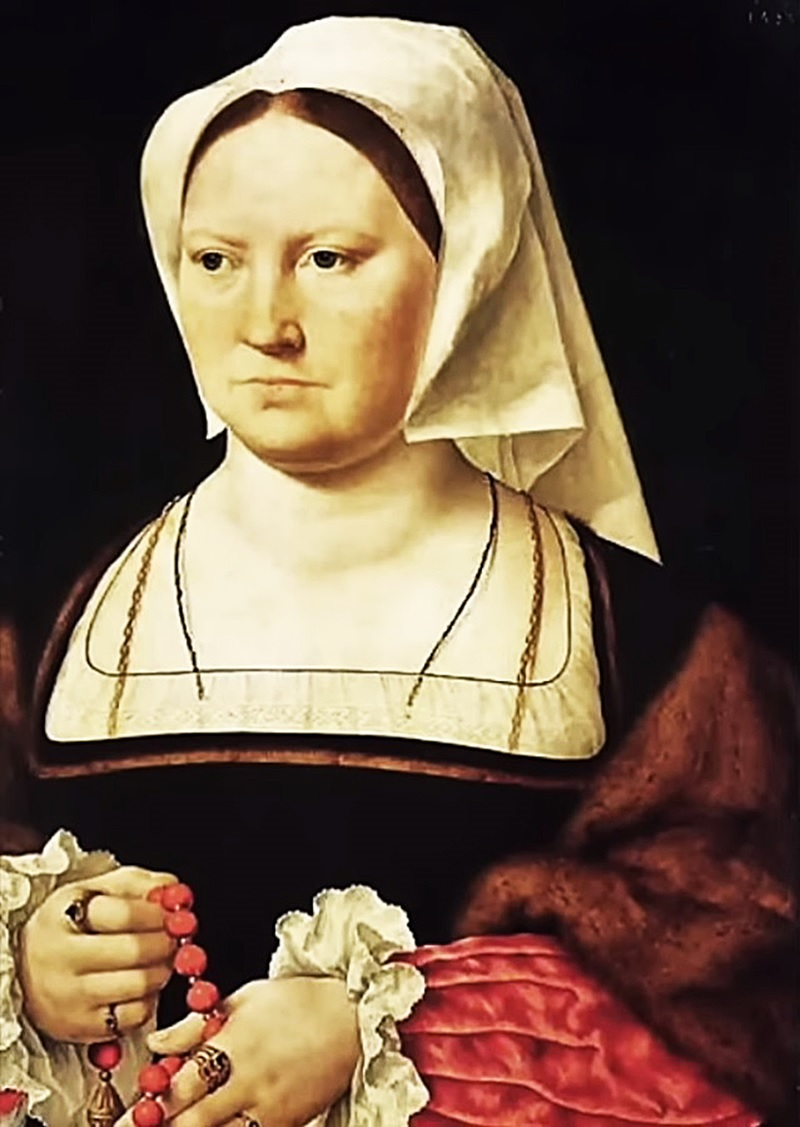
Thomas Howard, 3rd Duke of Norfolk, and Lady Elizabeth Stafford, Henry's parents
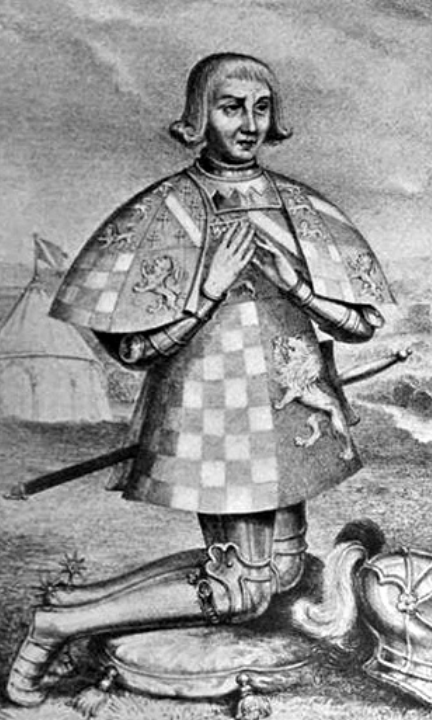
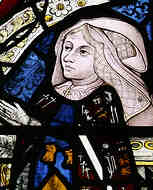
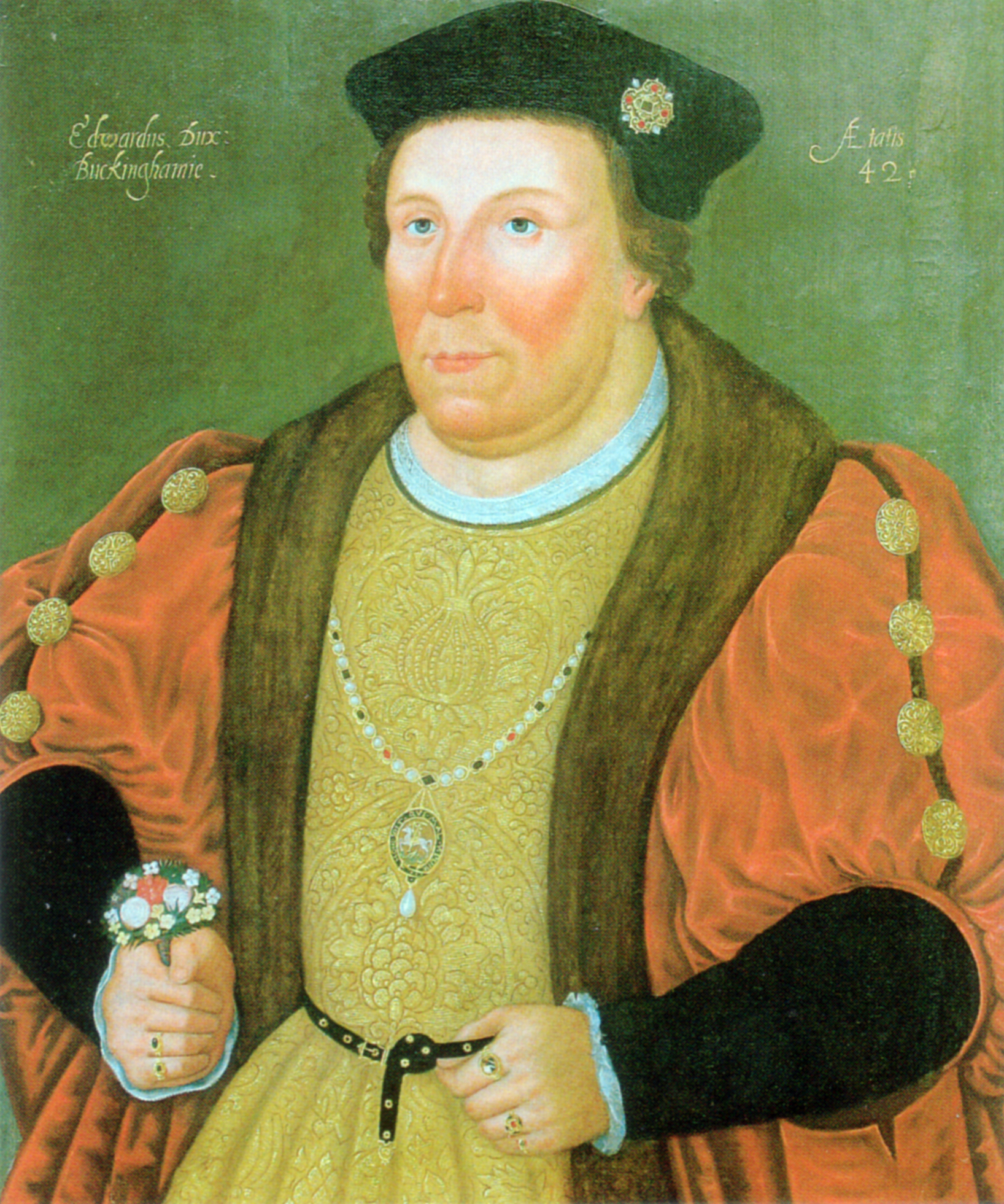
Thomas Howard, 2nd Duke of Norfolk, and his wife Elizabeth Tilney, and Edward Stafford, 3rd Duke of Buckingham, Henry's paternal and maternal grandparents

Henry was born in Hunsdon, Hertfordshire, being the eldest of five children of Thomas Howard, then Earl of Surrey, and his second wife Lady Elizabeth Stafford. His paternal grandparents were Thomas Howard, 2nd Duke of Norfolk, and Lady Elizabeth Tilney, and his maternal grandparents were Edward Stafford, 3rd Duke of Buckingham, and Lady Eleanor Percy. His younger siblings were Katherine, born 1518, Mary, born 1519, Thomas, born 1520, and Muriel, born in 1521. On his father's side, he was a first cousin of Mary, George and Anne Boleyn, as well as Catherine Howard. Both Anne and Catherine would become wives of King Henry VIII. At the time of his birth, his father's political career was on the rise, fuelled in large part by the powerful position of Henry's paternal grandfather, Thomas Howard, 2nd Duke of Norfolk. The Dukes of Norfolk and Buckingham (Henry's grandparents), along with Charles Brandon, 1st Duke of Suffolk, were the three most powerful peers in the Kingdom. Following Stafford's fall from grace and execution in May 1521, Norfolk and Suffolk remained the sole dukes of England.

Howard received a careful education from the best tutors of the time; as a young boy he was making translations from Latin, Italian and Spanish into English. Howard has been described as a "reckless, arrogant man", being very different from the rest of the family: "Most early sixteenth century Howards were dull dogs: hard, hard-nosed and dourly efficient. Howard was quite different. There was something in him of his paternal uncle, the Admiral Edward Howard, killed in action against the French in April 1513. There was more, however, of the darker inheritance of his maternal grandfather, the Duke of Buckingham. Howard inherited all Stafford's grand pride in blood and aristocracy, and all his determination that noblemen should once more come into their own. Perhaps it was from his mother's side too that he got his most dangerous trait: a rashness and a violence that bordered on madness. He also had a great intelligence that was both penetrating and fast and the result was one of the most remarkable men of the age".

== Career ==
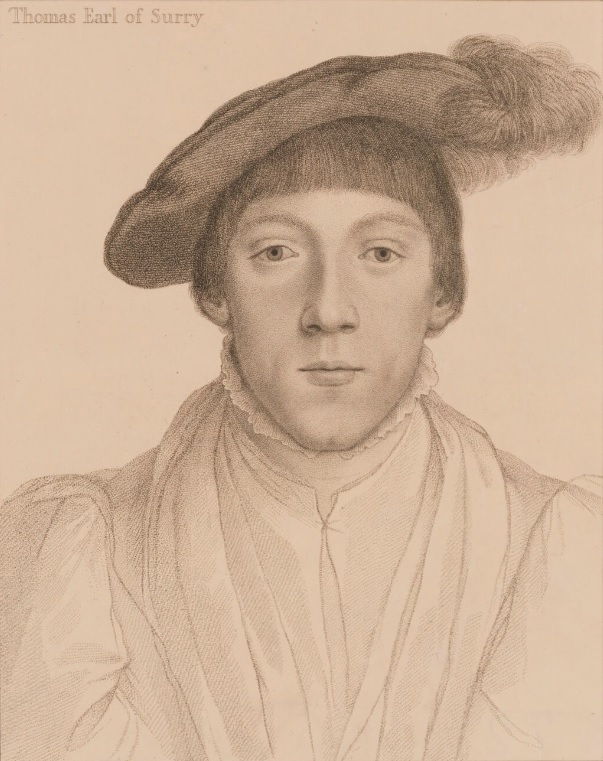
Sketch of Henry Howard, Earl of Surrey, showing a striking resemblance to his father, the Duke of Norfolk, created by Hans Holbein the Younger. c. 1530s. National Portrait Gallery

He was brought up at Windsor Castle with Henry FitzRoy, Duke of Richmond and Somerset, the illegitimate son of Henry VIII. He became a close friend, and later a brother-in-law of Fitzroy, following Fitzroy's marriage to his sister Mary. Like his father and grandfather, he was a soldier, serving in Henry VIII's French wars as Lieutenant General of the King on Sea and Land.

Howard was repeatedly imprisoned for rash behaviour: on one occasion for striking a courtier, and on another for wandering through the streets of London breaking the windows of houses whose occupants were asleep. He assumed the courtesy title of Earl of Surrey in May 1524 when his grandfather died and his father became Duke of Norfolk. Being the eldest son and heir to the 3rd Duke, Surrey was destined to be the future 4th Duke.

In 1532 he accompanied Anne Boleyn (his first cousin), King Henry VIII, and the Duke of Richmond on their visit to France, and remained there for more than a year as a member of the entourage of King Francis I of France. Surrey returned to England in the autumn of 1533, when Richmond's marriage to Mary Howard, Surrey's sister, took place. At the same time, his parents' marriage was in difficulties due to Norfolk's extramarital relationship with Bess Holland. Surrey took his father's side in the family dispute, and remained at Kenninghall, where his wife joined him in 1535. On 10 March 1536, Surrey's eldest son Thomas was born.

In May 1536 both Surrey and his father were obliged to take leading roles in the trial of their relations Anne Boleyn and her brother, the Viscount Rochford. They were tried in the great hall of the Tower. Norfolk presided over the trial as Lord High Steward; Surrey sat below him as Earl Marshal. In July, Surrey's brother-in-law the Duke of Richmond died at the age of 17 and was buried at Thetford Priory, one of the Howard properties. In October, Surrey accompanied his father in the suppression of the Pilgrimage of Grace, a Catholic rebellion which had broken out in the north of England against the Dissolution of the Monasteries.

Religiously, Surrey had reformist leanings but was Roman Catholic like his father, who was the premier Catholic nobleman of England. The Howards remained loyal to Catholicism during the Reformation. Surrey was educated and raised in the traditional religion and one of the causes of his fall from grace was his Catholicism. Years later, his eldest son Thomas would also fall from favour and be executed for having conspired against Queen Elizabeth I with the intention of replacing her with Mary, Queen of Scots and thus restore Catholicism to England.

== Marriage and progeny ==
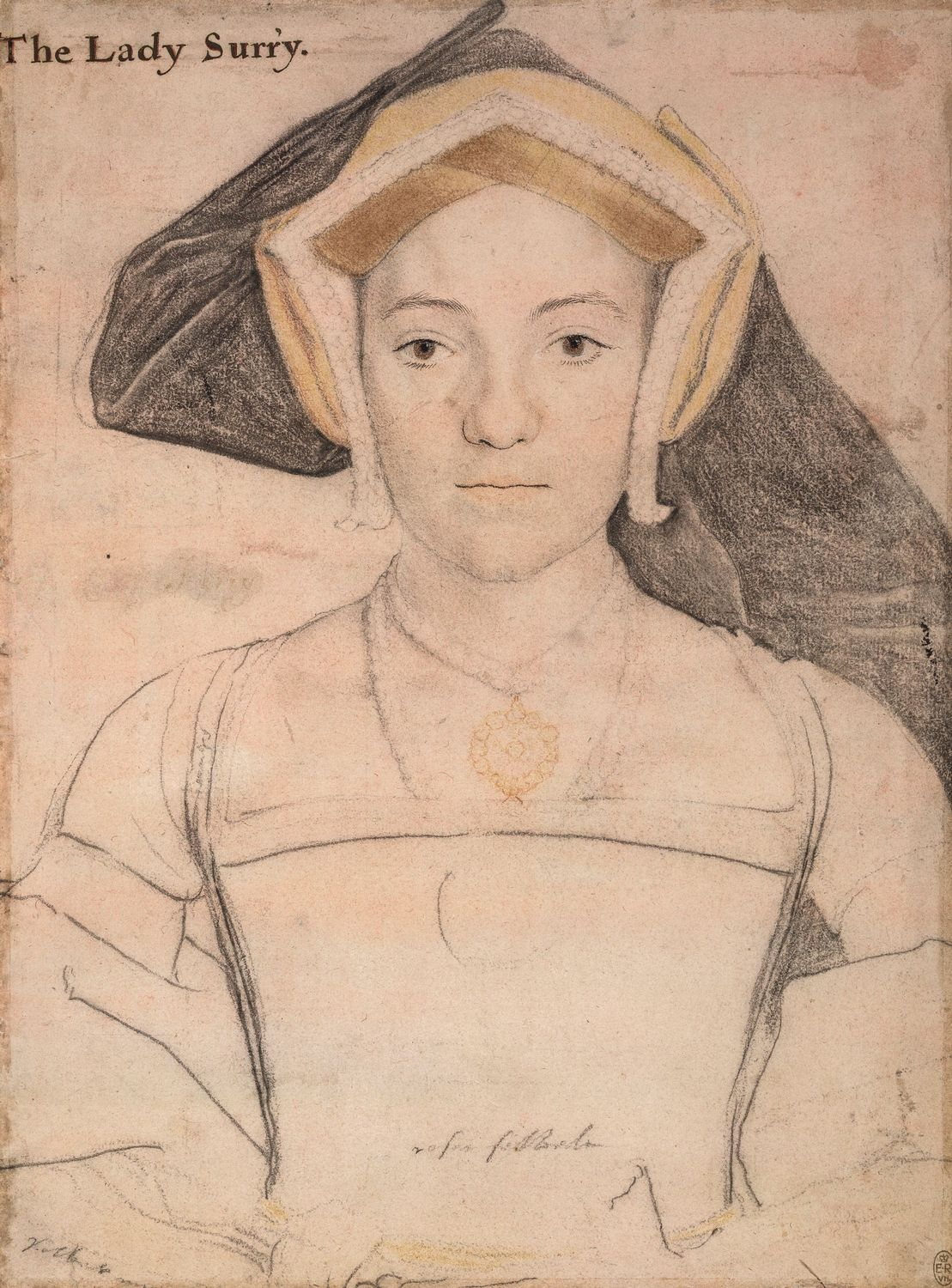
Frances de Vere, by Hans Holbein the Younger, c. 1535

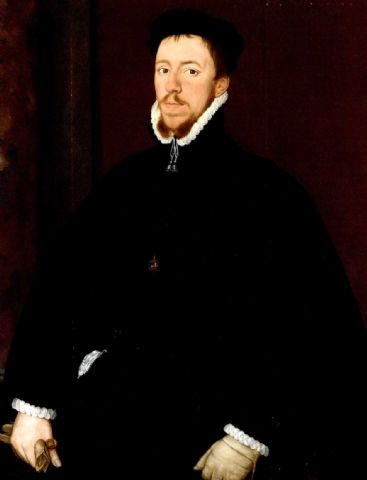
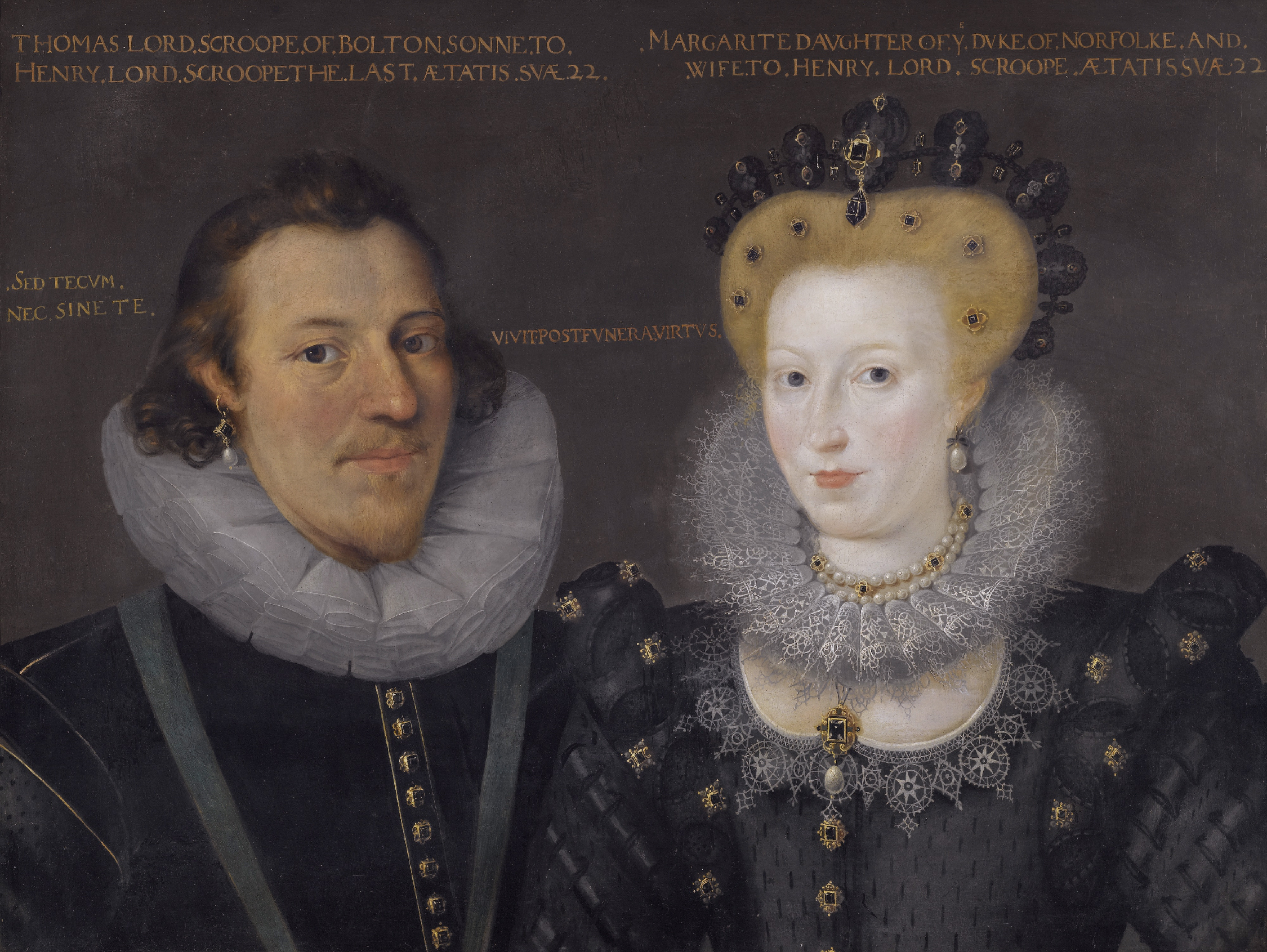
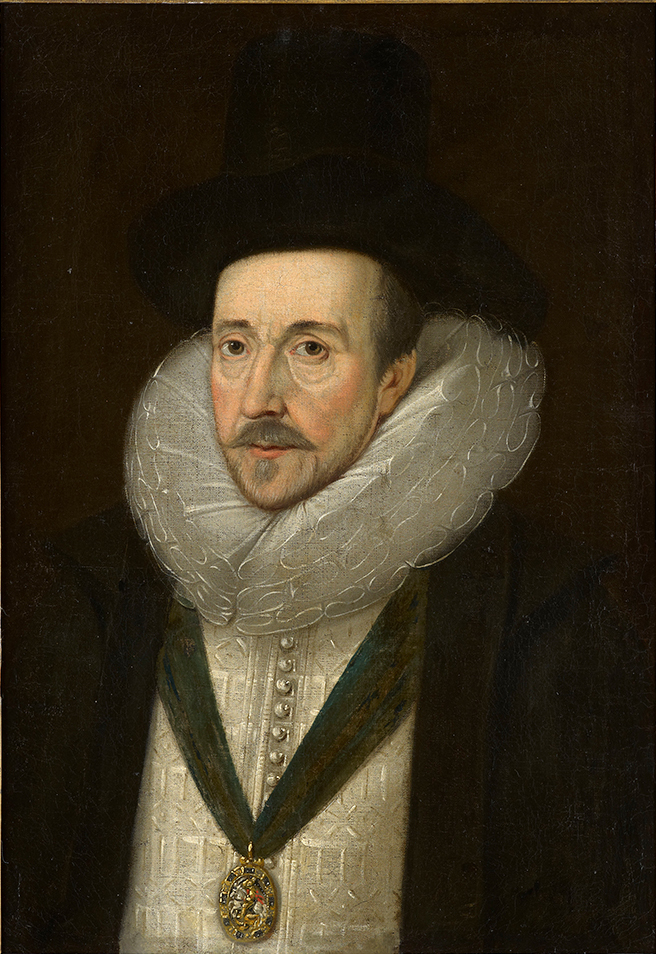
Thomas, Henry and Margaret, Lady Scrope, children of Surrey and Frances de Vere

In the early 1530s, Anne Boleyn, Surrey's first cousin, promoted a marriage between him and Princess Mary, the King's only surviving daughter with his wife Catherine of Aragon. The Duke of Norfolk was very enthusiastic about the match as it might give him greater political influence and put his family closer to the throne of England. Boleyn may have considered the match to be a way of neutralising the threat Mary posed to the succession of any children Anne might have by the King. But she changed her mind, fearing that the Duke could use the match to support Mary's claim to the throne and support Catherine of Aragon in the divorce proceedings which were still continuing. By October 1530, Boleyn persuaded her reluctant uncle to arrange instead for Surrey to marry Frances de Vere, one of the daughters of John de Vere, 15th Earl of Oxford with his second wife, Elizabeth Trussell.

On 15 January 1532, Norfolk and Oxford agreed the marriage contract. Frances would receive an amount of 4,000 marks, of which 200 was received upon her marriage and the rest would be received in instalments. Frances would retain this entitlement in the event of her husband's death. Norfolk gave the couple land that would produce an annual income of £300. The contract was signed a month later, on 13 February.

The wedding took place on 23 April, although due to the couple's young age, they did not begin to live together until 1535. Although the marriage was celebrated according to Catholic rites, there were religious differences between the families: Frances's father was a supporter of the Reformation and was the first Protestant Earl of Oxford, whereas Surrey's father was the premier Catholic nobleman of England. Surrey's father-in-law, the Earl of Oxford, was the holder of the second oldest extant earldom in England and was the Lord Great Chamberlain.

Surrey had with his wife two sons and three daughters:

- Thomas Howard, 4th Duke of Norfolk, who on his grandfather's death in 1554 inherited the Dukedom of Norfolk. He was married three times: (1) Mary FitzAlan (2) Margaret Audley (3) Elizabeth Leyburne.
- Henry Howard, 1st Earl of Northampton, who died unmarried.
- Jane Howard, who married Charles Neville, 6th Earl of Westmorland.
- Katherine Howard, who married Henry Berkeley, 7th Baron Berkeley.
- Margaret Howard, who married Henry Scrope, 9th Baron Scrope of Bolton. She was born shortly after her father's execution.

== Downfall and death ==
The Howards had little regard for the "new men" who had risen to power at court, such as Thomas Cromwell and the Seymour family. Surrey was less circumspect than his father in concealing this disdain. The Howards had many enemies at court. Howard himself branded Cromwell a "foul churl" and William Paget a "mean creature" as well as arguing that "These new erected men would by their wills leave no nobleman on life!" Norfolk's political intriguing against Cromwell took advantage of the King's failed marriage to Anne of Cleves, of which Cromwell was the main promoter, and led to the latter's fall from grace and execution in July 1540. During the last years of Henry VIII's reign, the Seymours, and the King's last wife, Catherine Parr, supporters of Protestantism, gained greater power and influence at court while the Howards, who were conservatives, were left politically isolated. Norfolk attempted to form an alliance with the Seymours by marrying his widowed daughter, Mary, to Thomas Seymour. Mary had given her consent to the marriage and the King approved the request, but such efforts were thwarted by Surrey's erratic and provocative behavior.

Henry VIII, who was becoming increasingly ill, became convinced that the Howards were planning to usurp the Crown from his son, Prince Edward. Surrey suggested that his widowed sister Mary should seduce the ageing king, her father-in-law, and become his mistress, to "wield as much influence on him as Madame d'Etampes doth about the French King". Mary, outraged, said she would "cut her own throat" rather than "consent to such villainy".

She and her brother therefore fell out, and Mary later gave testimony against Henry that helped lead to his trial and execution for treason. Surrey's family, including his mother, his sister Mary, and Bess Holland, his father's mistress, testified against both Surrey and the Duke. The provocative attitude of Surrey escalated to a dangerous point when he quartered the royal arms of Edward the Confessor to include them in his own coat of arms. John Barlow had once called Howard "the most foolish proud boy that is in England". Through his great-grandfather John Howard, 1st Duke of Norfolk (1483 creation), Surrey was a descendant of Thomas of Brotherton, 1st Earl of Norfolk, the sixth son of King Edward I, and the arms of the Howard ancestor, Thomas de Mowbray, 1st Duke of Norfolk (1397 creation), show that Surrey was entitled to bear Edward the Confessor's arms, but doing so was an act of pride, and provocative in the eyes of the Crown. Religious reasons were also one of the causes of Surrey's fall from grace. Henry VIII, very possibly influenced by the Seymours, supporters of Protestantism, believed that the earl and his father were going to usurp the Crown to reverse the Reformation and thus return the English Church to Roman jurisdiction.

The arms for which Howard was attainted (Edward the Confessor's attributed arms are in the fifth quarter with a label of three points plain Argent).

In consequence, the King ordered Howard's imprisonment on a charge of treasonably quartering the royal arms, and also that of his father. They were sentenced to death on 13 January 1547. Surrey was executed on 19 January 1547. On 27 January, the Howards, father and son, were attainted by statute. The Duke's execution was scheduled for the following day (28 January), but it did not take place because Henry VIII died in the early hours of that day. The Privy Council made a decision not to inaugurate the new reign with bloodshed, but Howard remained a prisoner in the Tower of London for the next six years, with most of his titles and property forfeited to the Crown, until he was released and pardoned in August 1553 upon the accession of the Catholic Queen Mary I. Surrey's son Thomas Howard, became heir to the dukedom of Norfolk in place of his father; he inherited the title upon the 3rd Duke's death in 1554.

== Burial ==
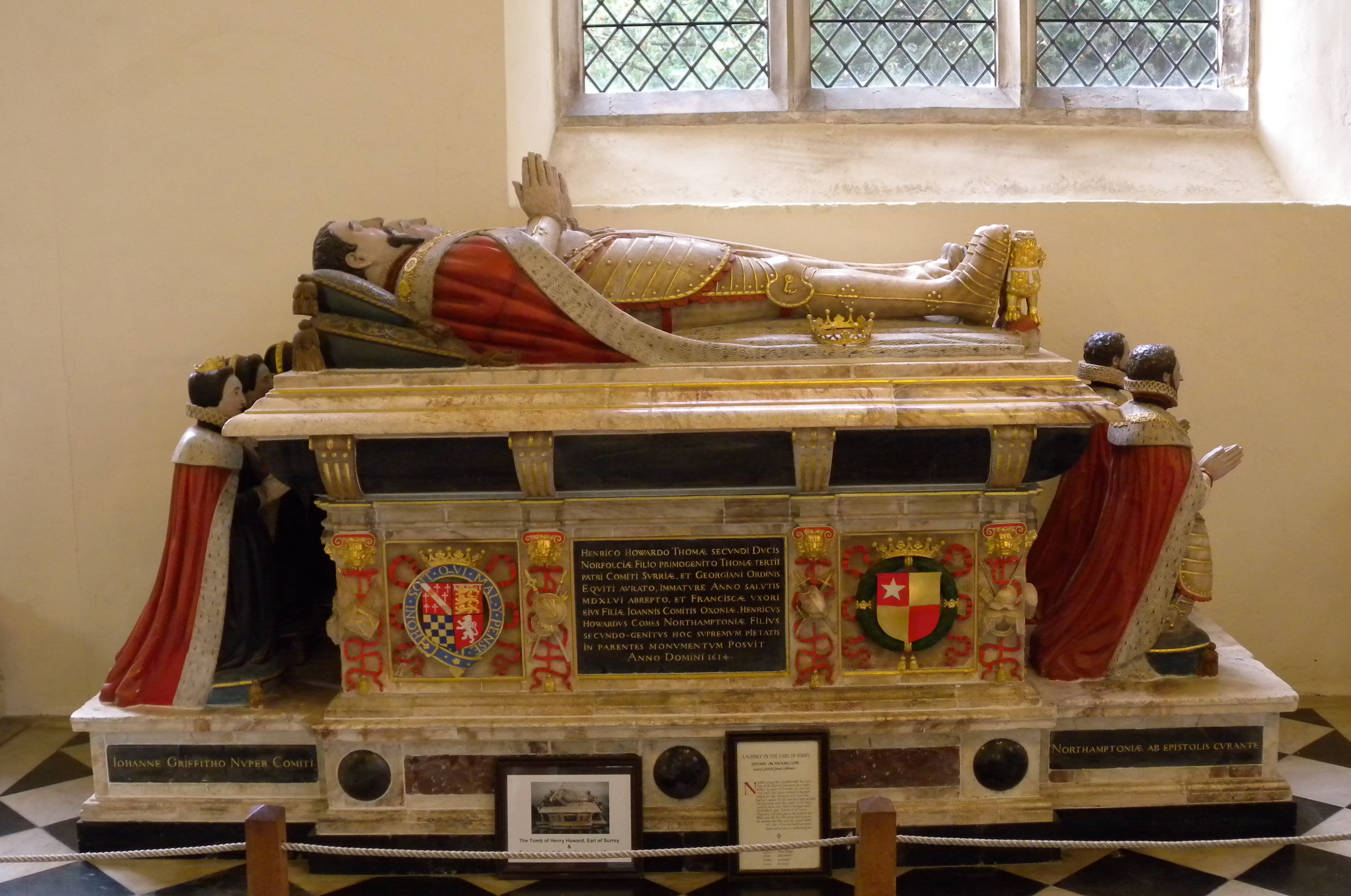
Tomb of Surrey and his wife, Frances de Vere, displaying the coats of arms of the Howard and De Vere families

Surrey was first buried in Church of All Hallows in Tower Street, although in 1614 his remains were moved to St Michael the Archangel's Church, Framlingham, Suffolk, where his spectacular painted alabaster tomb survives, richly decorated with the coats of arms and heraldic animals of the Howard and De Vere families. The tomb was erected by order of Surrey's youngest son, the Earl of Northampton. Although she was buried at Framlingham after her death in 1577, the remains of Lady Frances, Surrey's wife, were subsequently placed alongside those of her husband in the new tomb.

The Latin inscription on the Earl's tomb refers to Surrey as being the son of the 2nd Duke of Norfolk, technically a new creation, but treated for all practical purposes as a recreation of the forfeited title held by Surrey's great-grandfather, the 1st Duke, therefore both the 2nd and 3rd Duke would be numbered correctly.

Surrey's tomb is not a religious example, unlike his father's tomb which is richly decorated with religious iconography, but rather extolling the virtues of its subjects. Effigies of his two sons kneel at the foot and at the head his three daughters.

In the 1970s the funerary monument was in very poor state of preservation, sagging in the centre and with the ends collapsing. The restoration of the tomb was entrusted to John Green. During the restoration and cleaning, it was found that there were holes of the dowel where a coronet had once been placed (not worn on the head, since Surrey died in disgrace). A new coronet was made of lead casting with large fish weights for the baubles, painted, gilded, and placed in position.

== Literary activity and legacy ==
He and his friend Sir Thomas Wyatt may be considered as followers of the Petrarchism movement within the Renaissance literature. They were the first English poets to write in the sonnet form which Shakespeare later used, and Howard was the first English poet to publish blank verse (unrhymed iambic pentameter) in his translation of the second and fourth books of Virgil's Aeneid. Together, Wyatt and Howard, due to their excellent translations of Petrarch's sonnets, are known as "Fathers of the English Sonnet". While Wyatt introduced the sonnet form into English poetry, Howard gave it the rhyming metre and the division into quatrains which characterise the sonnets written in a way variously named English, Elizabethan, or Shakespearean sonnets.

Tottel's Miscellany, printed in 1557, contains 40 poems written by Henry Howard. Among the poems ascribed to Surrey is a loose translation of Martial 10:47, as "The means to attain happy life". A different version is preserved in MS. (Add. 36259). Another version of the translation had been printed ten years earlier in William Baldwin's Treatise of Morall Phylosophie (January 1547/8).

"The Things That Cause a Quiet Life" was written by Surrey:

My friend, the things that do attain
The happy life be these, I find:
The riches left, not got with pain,
The fruitful ground; the quiet mind;

The equal friend; no grudge, no strife;
No charge of rule nor governance;
Without disease the healthy life;
The household of continuance;

The mean diet, no dainty fare;
True wisdom joined with simpleness;
The night discharged of all care,
Where wine the wit may not oppress;

The faithful wife, without debate;
Such sleeps as may beguile the night:
Content thyself with thine estate,
Neither wish death, nor fear his might.

== In popular culture ==
Howard was portrayed by the actor David O'Hara in The Tudors, a television series which ran from 2007 to 2010.

== Family tree ==
Ancestors of Henry Howard, Earl of Surrey

8. John Howard, 1st Duke of Norfolk
4. Thomas Howard, 2nd Duke of Norfolk
9. Katherine Moleyns
2. Thomas Howard, 3rd Duke of Norfolk
10. Sir Frederick Tilney
5. Elizabeth Tilney
11. Elizabeth Cheney
1. Henry Howard, Earl of Surrey
12. Henry Stafford, 2nd Duke of Buckingham
6. Edward Stafford, 3rd Duke of Buckingham
13. Catherine Woodville
3. Elizabeth Stafford
14. Henry Percy, 4th Earl of Northumberland
7. Eleanor Percy, Duchess of Buckingham
15. Maud Herbert, Countess of Northumberland
