= Thomas Steyning =

16th-century English politician

Thomas Steyning (died c. 1582?), of Earl Soham, Suffolk, was an English politician. He was a member (MP) of the parliament of England for Castle Rising in 1559.

== Family ==
He married Frances Howard, Countess of Surrey and had two children: a son Henry, and a daughter, Mary. Mary married Charles Seckford.
