= Charles Neville, 6th Earl of Westmorland =

English nobleman and peer (1542–1601)

Charles Neville
- Earl of Westmorland
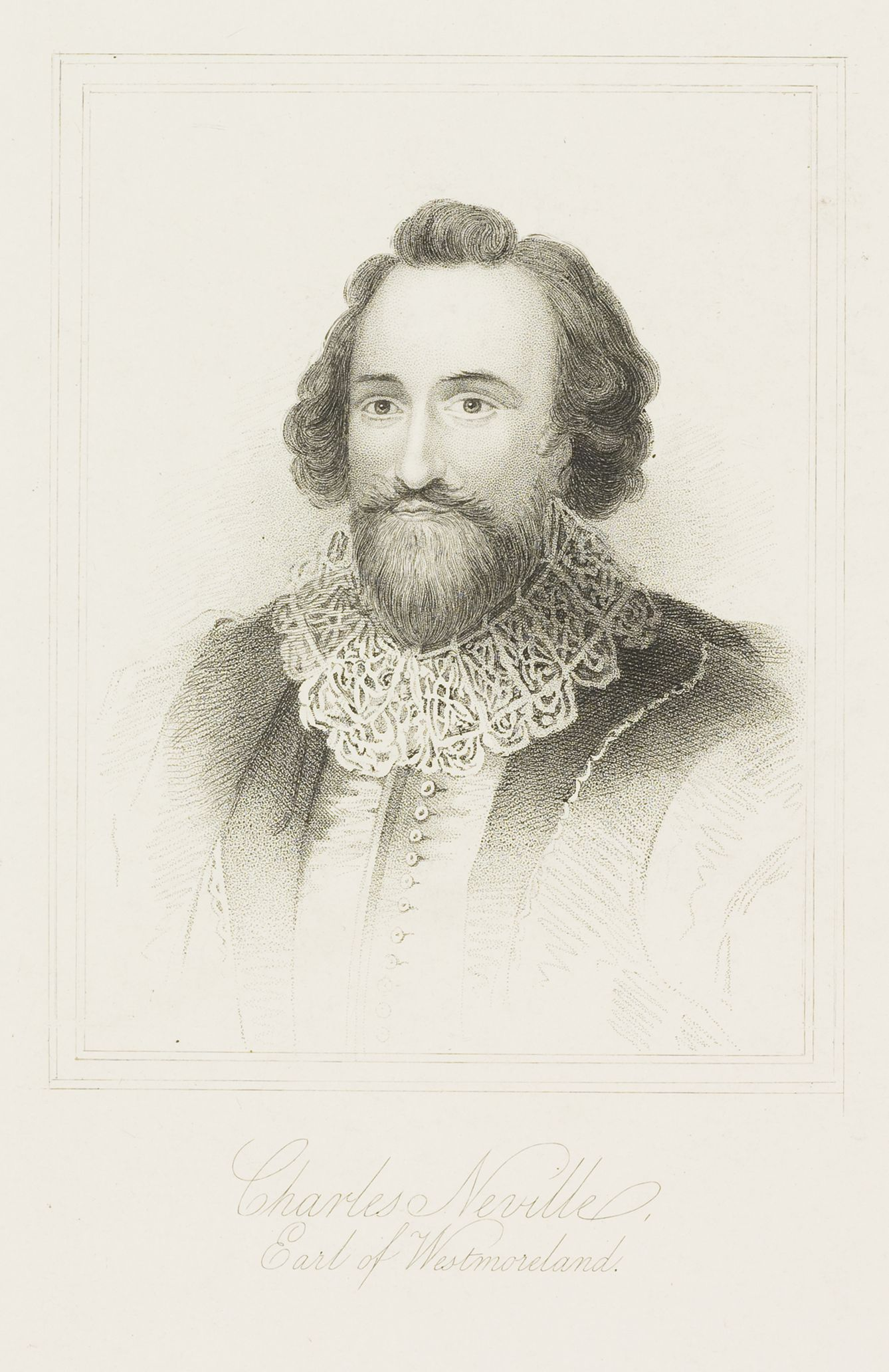
- Born: 18 August 1542
- Died: 16 November 1601 (aged 59)
- Noble family: Neville
- Spouse: Lady Jane Howard
- Issue: Margaret Neville; Catherine Neville; Anne Neville; Eleanor Neville unknown Neville, Lord Neville
- Father: Henry Neville, 5th Earl of Westmorland
- Mother: Anne Manners

Charles Neville, 6th Earl of Westmorland (18 August 1542 – 16 November 1601) was an English nobleman, politician and Roman Catholic rebel leader, who led the Rising of the North against Elizabeth I in 1569. After the failure of the Rising, he fled first to Scotland but then went into exile in the Spanish Netherlands, fearing the same fate as his fellow rebellion leader, Thomas Percy, 7th Earl of Northumberland, who had been captured by the Elizabethan government and executed for treason in August 1572.

== Early life ==
He was the son of Henry Neville, 5th Earl of Westmorland and Lady Anne Manners, second daughter of Thomas Manners, 1st Earl of Rutland.

== Career ==
A Roman Catholic by upbringing, and allied to the Catholic Howard family, Westmorland opposed Queen Elizabeth I's Protestant policies and, in November 1569 he joined Thomas Percy, 7th Earl of Northumberland in the Northern Rebellion against the Queen. The rebels captured Durham, and held a Catholic mass. Forces loyal to the queen mustered and crushed the rebellion, which failed in its attempt to rescue Mary, Queen of Scots from prison.

The two earls escaped to Scotland. Westmorland found protection and concealment for a long time at Ferniehirst Castle, Thomas Kerr's house in Roxburghshire. The Earl's cousin, Robert Constable, was hired by Sir Ralph Sadler to endeavour to track the unfortunate nobleman, and under the guise of friendship to betray him. Constable's correspondence appears among the Sadler State papers – an infamous memorial of treachery and baseness. Westmorland was at Huntly Castle in July 1570.

After Northumberland had been captured and turned over to Elizabeth in 1572, Westmorland feared a similar betrayal and left for Flanders, where he suffered the extremity of poverty. He would never see his wife, Jane Howard (died 1593) and their son and four daughters again. His vast inheritance was confiscated; Brancepeth, the stronghold of the Nevilles in war, and Raby, their festive Hall in peace, had passed into strangers' hands.

A spy report sent from Paris to London in August 1585 states that Charles Neville, the fugitive Earl of Westmorland, might, as part of a concerted Catholic invasion of England, land in Cumberland or Lancashire, bringing with him the son or sons of Henry Percy, 8th Earl of Northumberland. Historians are obliged to wonder which son(s) the report means, as sources indicate that all sons were in England at the time of their father's mysterious death (possibly murder, possibly suicide) in 1585.

In 1588, Westmorland commanded a force of 700 English fugitives in the seaports of Flanders, who with the army of 103 companies of foot and 4000 horse, making together 30,000 men under Alexander Farnese, Duke of Parma; and besides 12,000 men brought by the Duke of Guise to the coast of Normandy, intended for an attack on the West of England, under cover and protection of the Spanish Armada.

Westmorland fled, to live in exile on the Continent; he was attainted by Parliament in 1571 (Attainders of Earl of Westmorland and others Act 1571). He survived on a small pension from Philip II of Spain. George More wrote from Liège to William Cecil seeking religious toleration and the Earl's rehabilitation in August 1597.

== Personal life ==
In 1563, he married Jane Howard, daughter of Henry Howard, Earl of Surrey, and Frances de Vere, Countess of Surrey. She was the sister of Thomas Howard, 4th Duke of Norfolk, and Henry Howard, 1st Earl of Northampton. Charles and Jane were second cousins because Howard's grandmother, Lady Elizabeth Stafford, was the sister of Lady Katherine, Neville's paternal grandmother. The couple had a son and four daughters:

- Lord Neville (1569–1571), whose first name is unknown.
- Lady Margaret Neville, who married Nicholas Pudsey.
- Lady Katherine Neville, who married Sir Thomas Grey of Chillingham, Northumberland, and died without issue.
- Lady Anne Neville, who married Sir David Ingleby, a younger son of Sir William Ingleby of Ripley, Yorkshire, and died without male issue.
- Lady Eleanor Neville, who died unmarried before 25 June 1604.

Westmorland died penniless and largely forgotten on 16 November 1601.

== Notes ==
Peerage of England
Preceded by Henry Neville	Earl of Westmorland; 1564–1571	Forfeit
