= St Michael the Archangel's Church, Framlingham =

Coordinates: 52.2224°N 1.3444°E

St Michael’s Church Framlingham
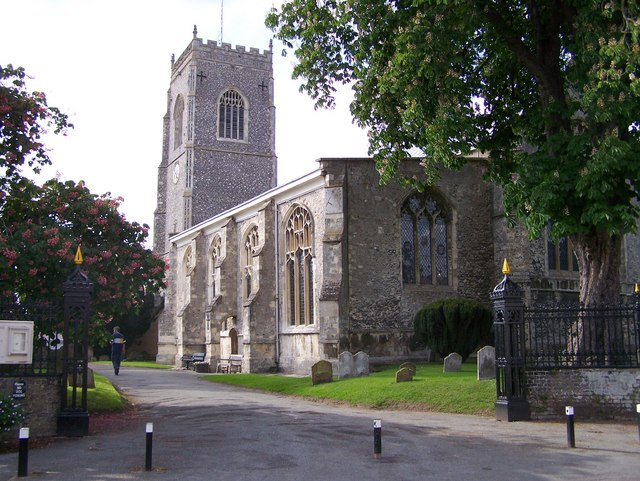
- St Michael’s Church Framlingham
- Country: England
- Denomination: Church of England
- Previous denomination: Roman Catholic
- Churchmanship: Broad Church
- Website: https://www.stmichaelsframlingham.org.uk

History
- Dedication: Saint Michael

Administration
- Province: Canterbury
- Diocese: St Edmundsbury & Ipswich
- Parish: Framlingham, Suffolk

Clergy
- Rector: The Revd Canon Christopher Davey

St Michael's Church in Framlingham, Suffolk is a Church of England church dedicated to Saint Michael. It was the burial site of the Howard family. The church was designated a Grade I listed building in 1966. Currently the Church accepts monetary donations for its maintenance and preservation.

== History ==
The Church of Saint Michael, Framlingham, has been built, rebuilt, and added to several times since construction. A surviving feature, the capitals of the chancel arch, date from the twelfth century, but the majority of the church was built in the Perpendicular style between 1350 and 1555. The roof is decorated with intricate fan tracery which conceal hammer beams. The roof itself dates from about 1521.

Framlingham was a major seat of the Earls and Dukes of Norfolk. Vast estates of the Norman Bigods were forfeited to Edward I and Framlingham came to Thomas of Brotherton, eldest son of Edward and Margaret of France. After many other changes of inheritance, in about 1635 Sir Robert Hitcham bequeathed the Framlingham estate to Pembroke College, Cambridge, who remain Lords of the Manor to this day. The church contains many noteworthy tombs including that of Thomas Howard, 3rd Duke of Norfolk and his wife Anne of York.

In June 2024 the Church was broken into and silverware stolen.

== Bells ==
The church has a ring of 8 bells from a mixture of founders and date from between the 15th and 20th centuries. The ring was augmented to 8 with addition of 2 new trebles in 1718 cast by John Stephens of Norwich. The bells hang in oak frame made by George Day of Eye, Suffolk dating from 1892. The bells were overhauled by John Taylor & Co of Loughborough in 1990.

Bells of St Michael's, Framlingham
Bell	Date	Note	Diameter	Founder	Weight		
Bell	Date	Note	Diameter	Founder	long measure	lb	kg
Treble	1718	E	26.50 in (67.3 cm)	John Stephens	4 long cwt 0 qr 18 lb	466	211
2nd	1718	D#	28.75 in (73.0 cm)	John Stephens	4 long cwt 1 qr 6 lb	482	219
3rd	1720	C#	30.50 in (77.5 cm)	John Stephens	5 long cwt 0 qr 20 lb	580	263
4th	c1499	B	31.50 in (80.0 cm)	Brasyers of Norwich	5 long cwt 2 qr 5 lb	621	282
5th	c1499	A	34.00 in (86.4 cm)	Brasyers of Norwich	6 long cwt 3 qr 18 lb	774	351
6th	1583	G#	37.25 in (94.6 cm)	William Brend	8 long cwt 0 qr 16 lb	912	414
7th	1622	F#	42.25 in (107.3 cm)	William & John II Brend	12 long cwt 1 qr 18 lb	1,390	630
Tenor	1902	E	46.88 in (119.1 cm)	Mears & Stainbank	16 long cwt 0 qr 14 lb	1,806	819

== 1708 Thamar organ ==
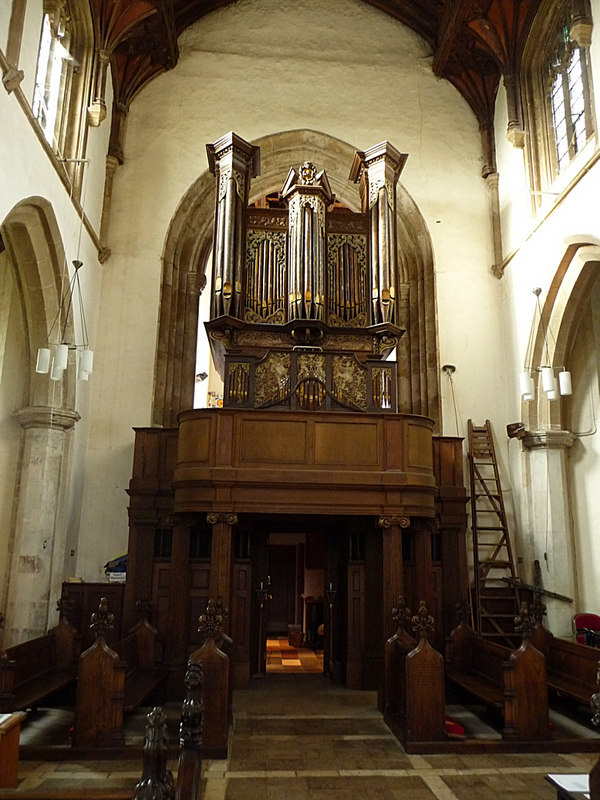
The Thamar organ

One of the most noted features of the church is the world-famous Thamar organ. Only eight large-scale organs in total survived the English Civil War, and only three of those are Thamars. The other examples being in Gloucester Cathedral and St Nicholas's church in the hamlet of Stanford upon Avon, Northamptonshire.

The painted front pipes belong to the Thamar organ first built for the church's patrons, Pembroke College, Cambridge, by Thomas Thamar in 1674 just after the Restoration (celebrated by the hatchment on the south wall); the only other painted pipes of this style are to be found in Gloucester Cathedral. The case is believed to date back to before 1630 (maybe much earlier – 1580 has been mentioned) and some of the pipework may at least pre-date the Commonwealth.

In 1707 the college decided it would like a larger and more up to date organ by Father Smith for their Wren chapel; the Thamar organ came to St. Michael's in 1708 along with its case. It was placed on a gallery where it stayed until 1898. For a period the organ was moved about the church first to the north aisle and then into the chancel until 1970 when the gallery was recovered from the castle and reunited with the organ in its present position under the leadership of Michael Gillingham and with the aid of the Pilgrim Trust.

The organ's history is uncertain. One concerns the famous and historic organ builder John Byfield who worked on the organ during 1740 according to reports in the Ipswich Journal. When Hunter rebuilt the organ in 1898 he used most of Thamar's pipework on the great organ except for the cornet and trumpet which he replaced with a harmonic flute and gamba. The cornet went missing and the trumpet was lost. The swell incorporated at least three eighteenth-century stops.

The organ was restored in 1970 by Bishop and Son of Ipswich. The Thamar organ was restored with no additions or subtractions (apart from a board for bottom C#). The cornet was rediscovered in the Rectory attic and repaired, restored and reconstructed. A very old rank of trumpet pipes was found to replace the lost set. The swell was matched up to complement the great and based on its 18th-century content. The pedal was likewise treated. The Cromorne was introduced by John Budgen of Bishops and is an excellent and versatile addition to the swell organ. A pedal reed was also added. The organ specification is available at the National Pipe Organ Register.

The organ has illustrious associations: Mendelssohn is believed to have given lessons to Caroline Attwood when he visited her elder brother George Attwood, then Rector. Mendelssohn knew George's father, Thomas Attwood, composer and organist of St. Paul's Cathedral and one time pupil of Mozart.

== Howard family monuments ==
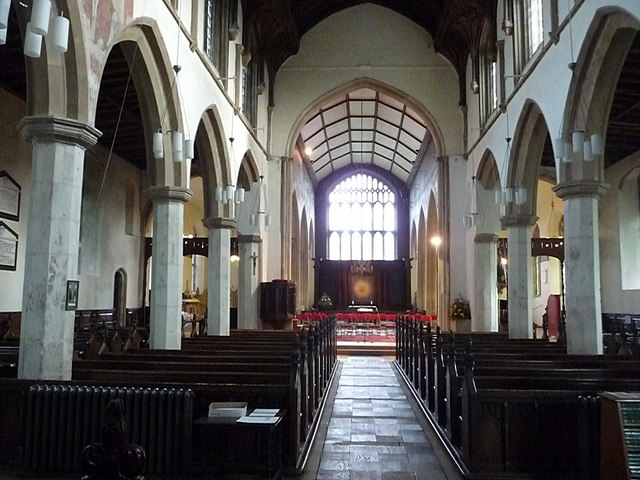
The interior of the church

The church contains family burials of the Howard family (mostly moved after the dissolution of Thetford Priory)

=== Duke of Richmond ===
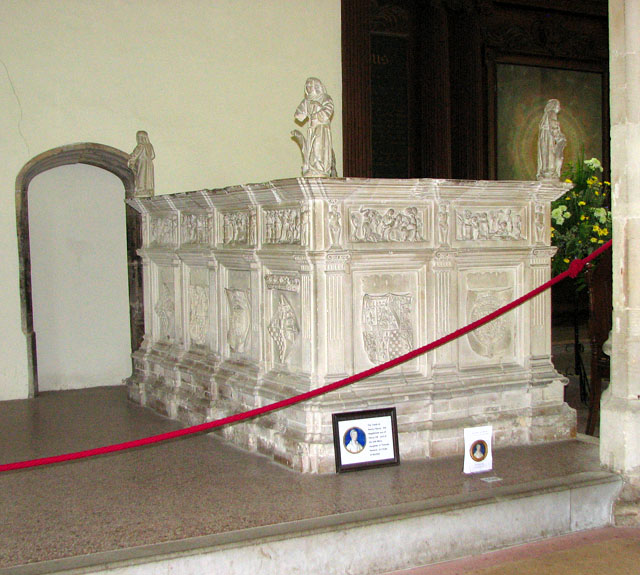
Tomb of Henry FitzRoy, Duke of Richmond

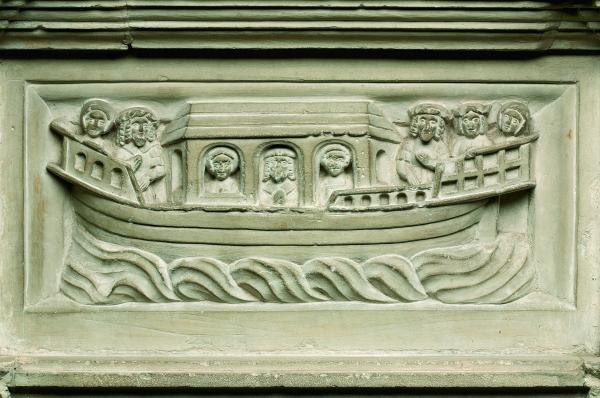
One of the Biblical Old Testament scenes at the tomb of the Duke of Richmond

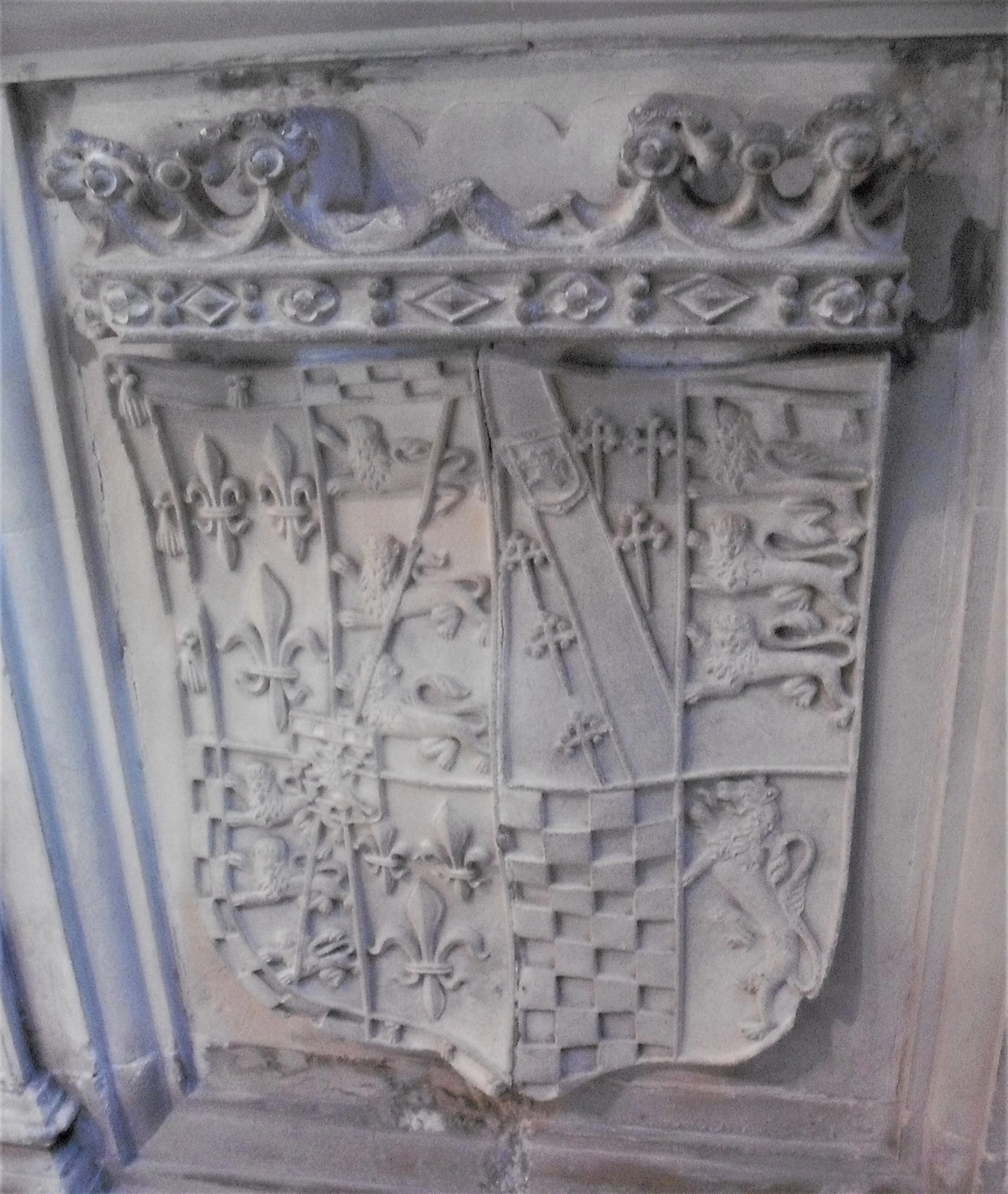
Coat of arms of the Duke of Richmond, impaled with the Howard family arms (by his marriage to Lady Mary, daughter of the 3rd Duke of Norfolk) on his tomb in Framlingham Church.

Henry FitzRoy, Duke of Richmond and Somerset (1519–1536), an illegitimate son of Henry VIII by his mistress Elizabeth Blount, is buried in the church in an beautiful ornate tomb.

The Duke died in July 1536 and was initially buried in the Thetford Priory, originally burial place of the Howard family members. Despite being illegitimate, the King promoted his son to high positions, honors, and titles since at that time he was his only surviving male. In his desire to promote the interests of his family, the 3rd Duke of Norfolk had arranged a betrothal between his daughter Mary and FitzRoy. The couple was married, but due to their young ages did not live together and the consummation of the marriage was prevented by FitzRoy's early death from consumption when he was only 17. The responsibility for FitzRoy's burial was placed upon the Duke of Norfolk by King Henry who seems to have lost interest in his son, once dead. After the dissolution of Thetford, the tomb and its body were brought to Framlingham and Mary FitzRoy was also buried here after her death in December 1557.

In February 1540, when Thetford Priory was about to be closed, the Duke of Norfolk, FitzRoy's father-in-law petitioned the King not to close the Priory Church on the grounds that both his first wife Anne of York, FitzRoy's great-aunt, as well as Richmond himself were buried there. The request had no effect; at the same time however, the King ordered that the current dissolution of the monasteries be briefly suspended, so that everyone who wished had time to rebury the remains of their relations. Howard moved his son-in-law's grave to Framlingham Church.

FitzRoy's tomb has a mix of royal and religious iconography, with his personal coat of arms surrounded by the collar of the Order of the Garter and the Order's motto "Honi soit qui mal pense", and the coats of arms of the Howard family (by his marriage to Mary Howard), and friezes showing scenes from the Biblical Old Testament (mainly from the Book of Genesis and part of the Book of Exodus). On the north side are the birth of Eve; God giving the Garden of Eden into the charge of Adam and Eve; the Temptation, and the Expulsion from Paradise. On the west are the nursing of Cain and Abel, and Adam digging to return to Eden; Cain and Abel making their sacrifices (offerings) to God, and Cain killing Abel. On the south side are Noah's Ark in the Flood; the drunkenness of Noah; the Prophet Abraham and the Angels, and Lot escaping from Sodom and Gomorrah. On the east are Abraham and his son Isaac as well as Moses and the Law tables, and the Israelites sacrificing to the Golden Calf.

One of the scenes carved on the tomb is the outline of a small door which was the private entrance of noblemen from the Castle.

=== Thomas Howard, 3rd Duke of Norfolk ===
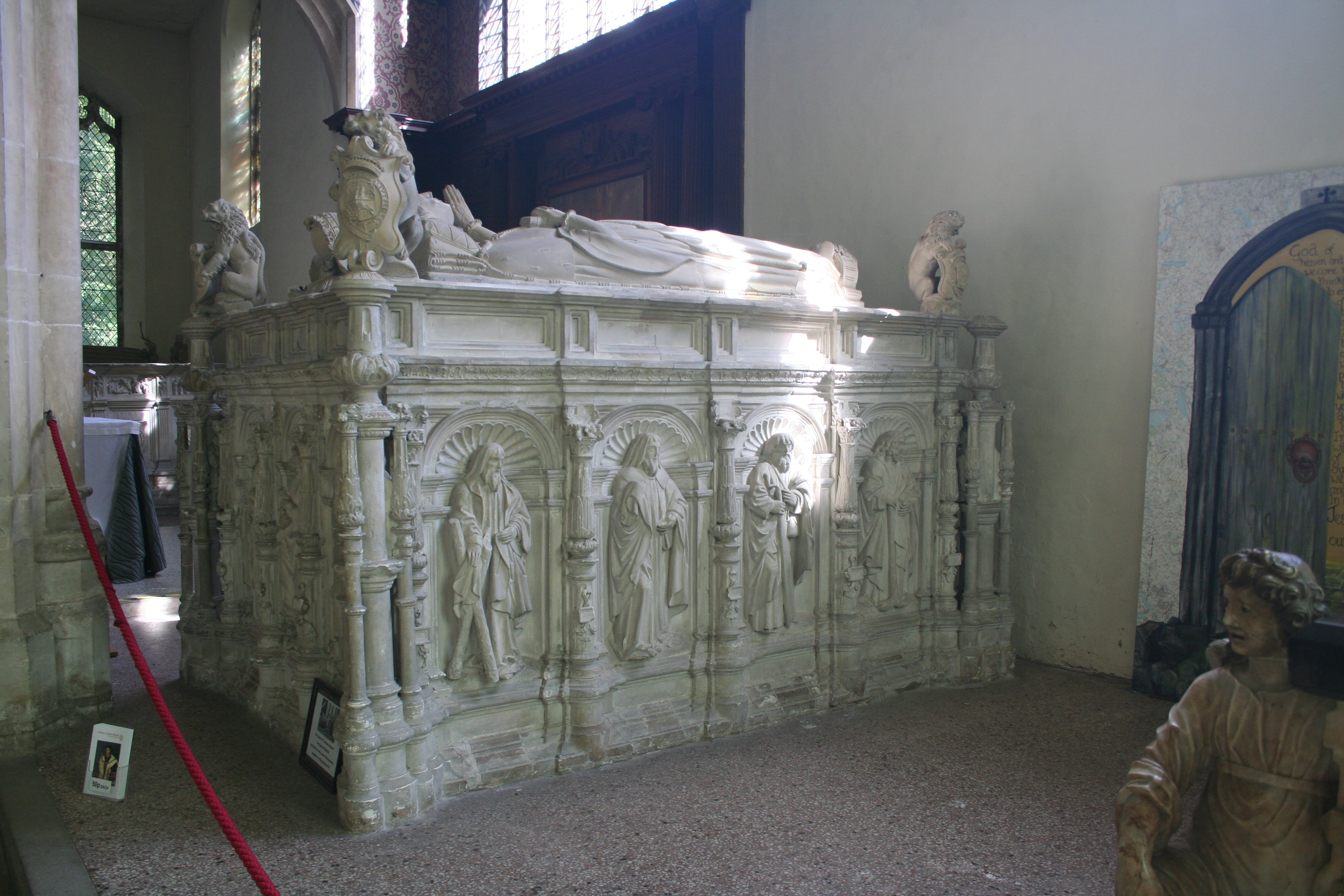
Tomb of the 3rd Duke of Norfolk and his first wife Anne of York in Framlingham Church

The tomb of Thomas Howard stands immediately to the south of the high altar. Archeologically it bears comparison with anything in northern Europe if not perhaps in Italy. The religious representations on Howard's tomb are of the twelve Apostles and some of the oldest Christian saints. On the south side there are St Matthew the Evangelist, St James the Great, St James the Less and St Andrew; on the west St Peter, the Prophet Aaron and St Paul; on the north St Matthias, St Jude Thaddeus, Simon the Zealot (also known as Simon the Canaanite) and St Philip; and on the east St John the Evangelist, Simeon of Jerusalem and St Thomas. These represent the last major display of religious imagery in England before the full weight of Reformation theology made such things impossible.

The design of the tomb is part-French and part-English and it is significant that it was commissioned, not by the Crown, but on behalf of the greatest nobleman in England . It is thought that parts, at least, of this tomb may have been incorporated in another which was at Thetford for Thomas Howard, 2nd Duke of Norfolk victor of Flodden . In turn, this man's father had been John Howard who had died fighting for Richard III at Bosworth and for whom the Norfolk dukedom had been created in the Howard name. It is known that there are two other male bodies interred in the 3rd Duke's tomb and it is an unproven supposition that these are the bodies of his father and grandfather, removed to Framlingham after the dissolution of Thetford Priory.

=== Wives of Thomas Howard, 4th Duke of Norfolk ===
He is buried at St Peter ad Vincula at the Tower of London, executed there for trying to make a fourth marriage to Mary, Queen of Scots. In their robes of state and resting their heads and feet on emblems connected with their Houses, his wives Mary FitzAlan and Margaret Audley are represented, though only Margaret is buried here. The large space between the effigies is said to have been reserved for Norfolk himself, his third wife, or even Mary, Queen of Scots. The sides are decorated with their heraldic quarterings. It would seem that at some former period there were columns which supported a canopy over the monument which must have rendered it highly magnificent.

In 1842 this vault was opened and found to be empty but for a skull and some ashes. Tradition has it that the inhabitants of the town hid some of their valuables in the monument during the Jacobite rising of 1745 and swept it clean afterwards.

=== Henry Howard, Earl of Surrey ===
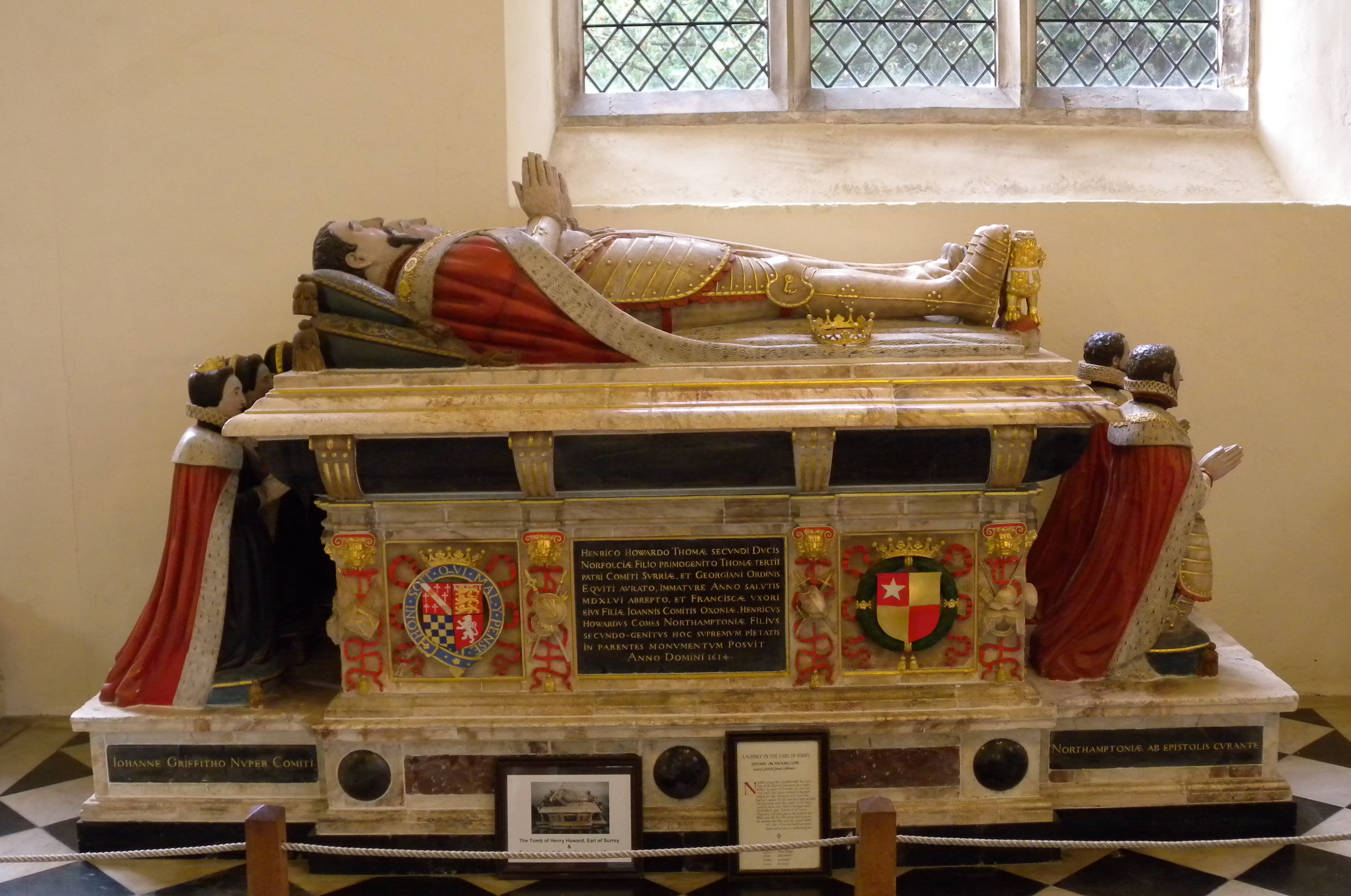
Tomb of Henry Howard, Earl of Surrey displaying the Howard and De Vere families coats of arms

Before his own death in 1614 Henry Howard, 1st Earl of Northampton, Surrey's youngest son made arrangements for his father's and mother's remains to be removed to Framlingham and this monument portraying them both to be erected in 1614. The Latin inscription refers to Surrey as being the son of the Second Duke, which is technically correct as after the Battle of Bosworth the Dukedom was rendered extinct and the Second Duke became the First Duke of the new creation.

The tomb chest is not a religious example but rather extolling the virtues of its subjects. His two sons kneel at the foot end. At the head end are Howard's three daughters:

- Jane, who wears a coronet
- in the centre is Katherine Howard, who married Henry Berkeley, 7th Baron Berkeley
- Margaret who married Henry Scrope, 9th Baron Scrope of Bolton (1534–1592).

By about 1976 the whole monument was subsiding in the centre and the ends collapsing in on itself. The restoration was entrusted to John Green and the monument was cleaned and restored. It was when it was being cleaned that Mr Green found the dowel holes next to Surrey's calf where there once was a coronet (not worn, since he died in disgrace). A new coronet was made of lead casting with large fish weights for the baubles, the whole thing was then painted, gilded, and placed in position.

== In fiction ==
The church is one of a number of locations in Framlingham that plays a role in the mystery novel Magpie Murders by Anthony Horowitz.
