= Jane Howard, Countess of Westmorland =

English noblewoman

Jane Howard
- Born: 1533–1537
- Buried: 30 June 1593; Kenninghall, Norfolk
- Noble family: Howard
- Spouse: Charles Neville, 6th Earl of Westmorland
- Parents: Henry Howard, Earl of Surrey; Frances de Vere
- Religion: Roman Catholicism

Jane Neville (née Howard), Countess of Westmorland (1533/37 – buried 30 June 1593), was a Roman Catholic English noblewoman who had a role in the Rising of the North in 1569 against Queen Elizabeth I.

== Family ==
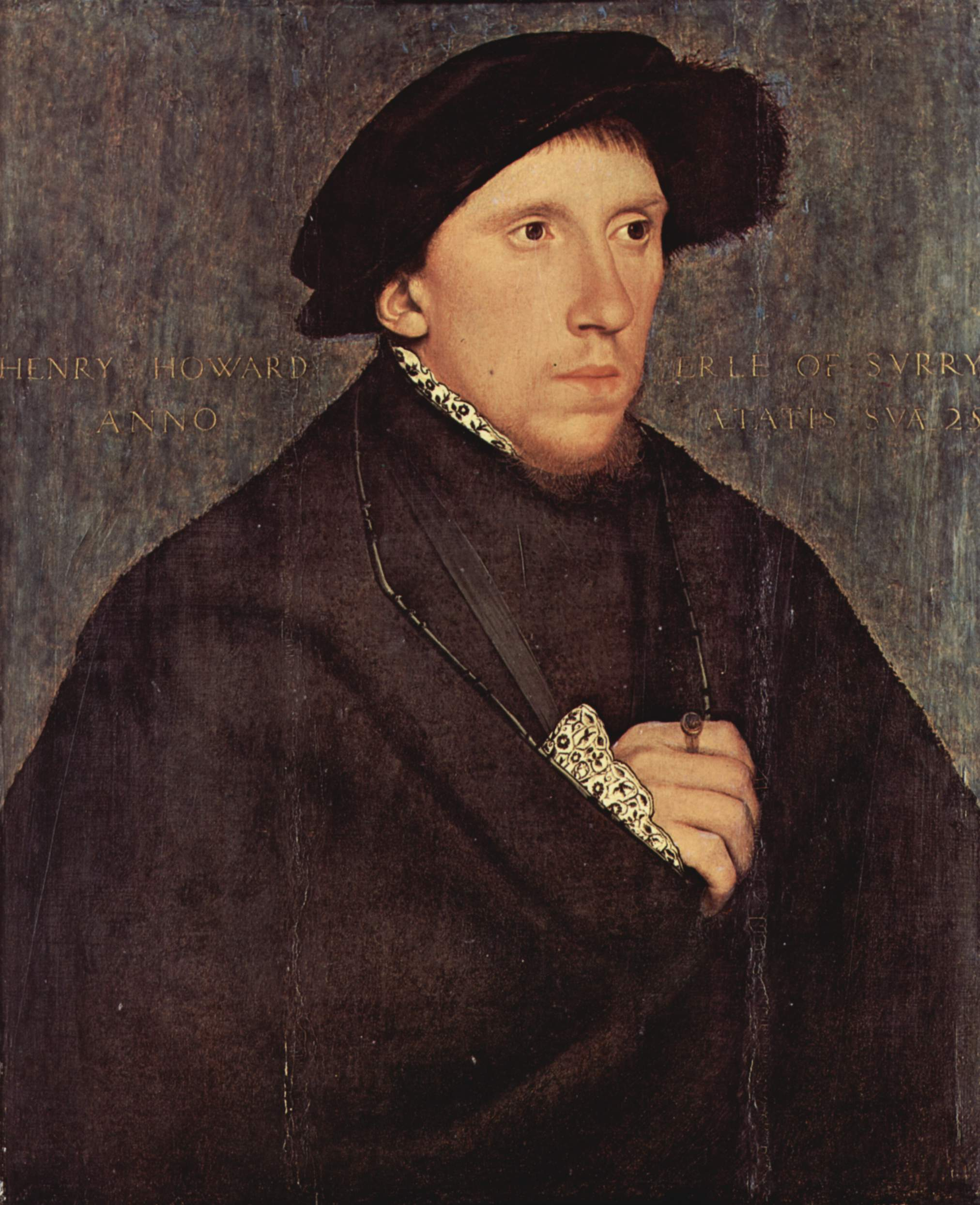
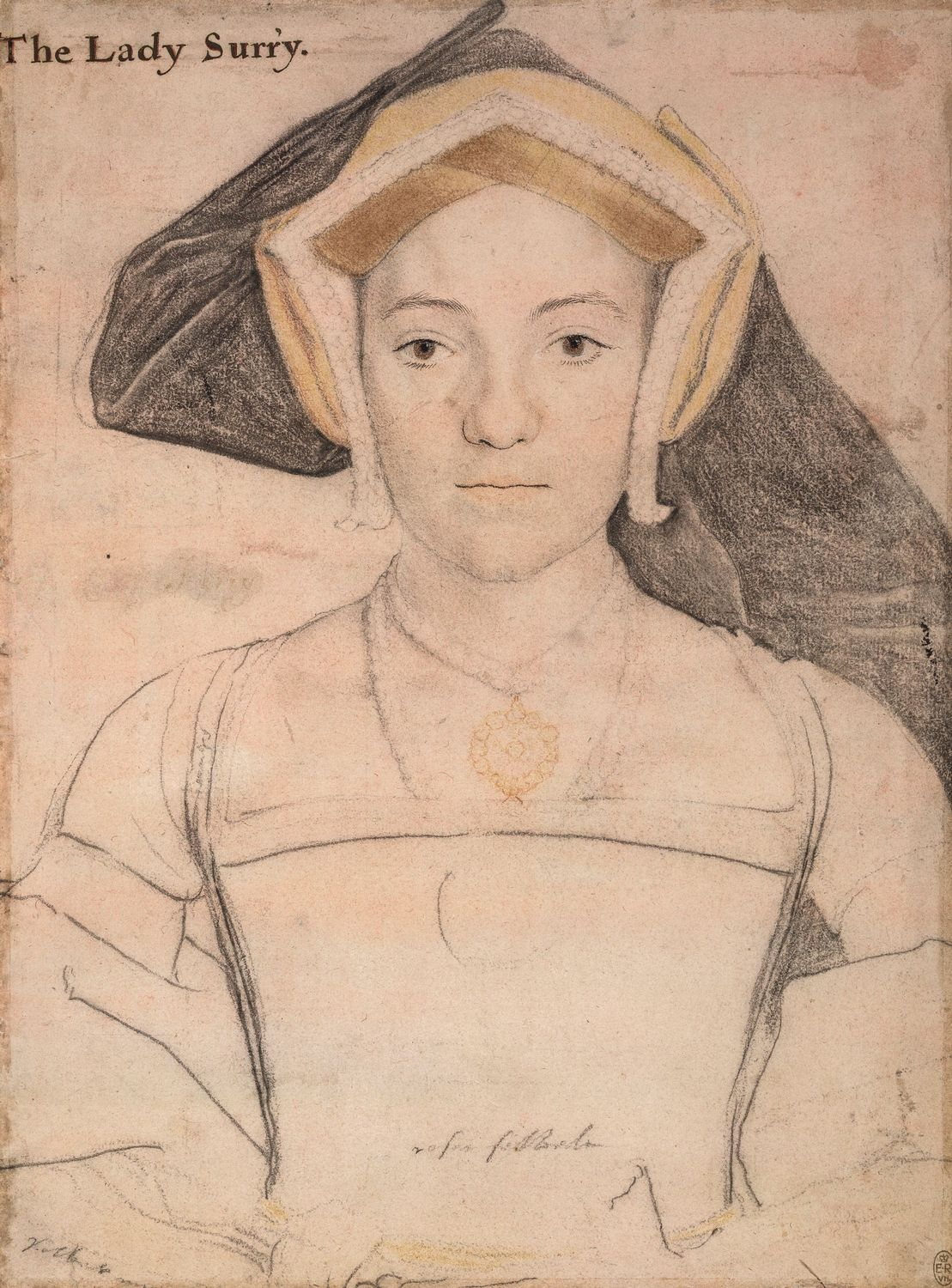
Henry Howard, Earl of Surrey and Frances de Vere, Jane's parents
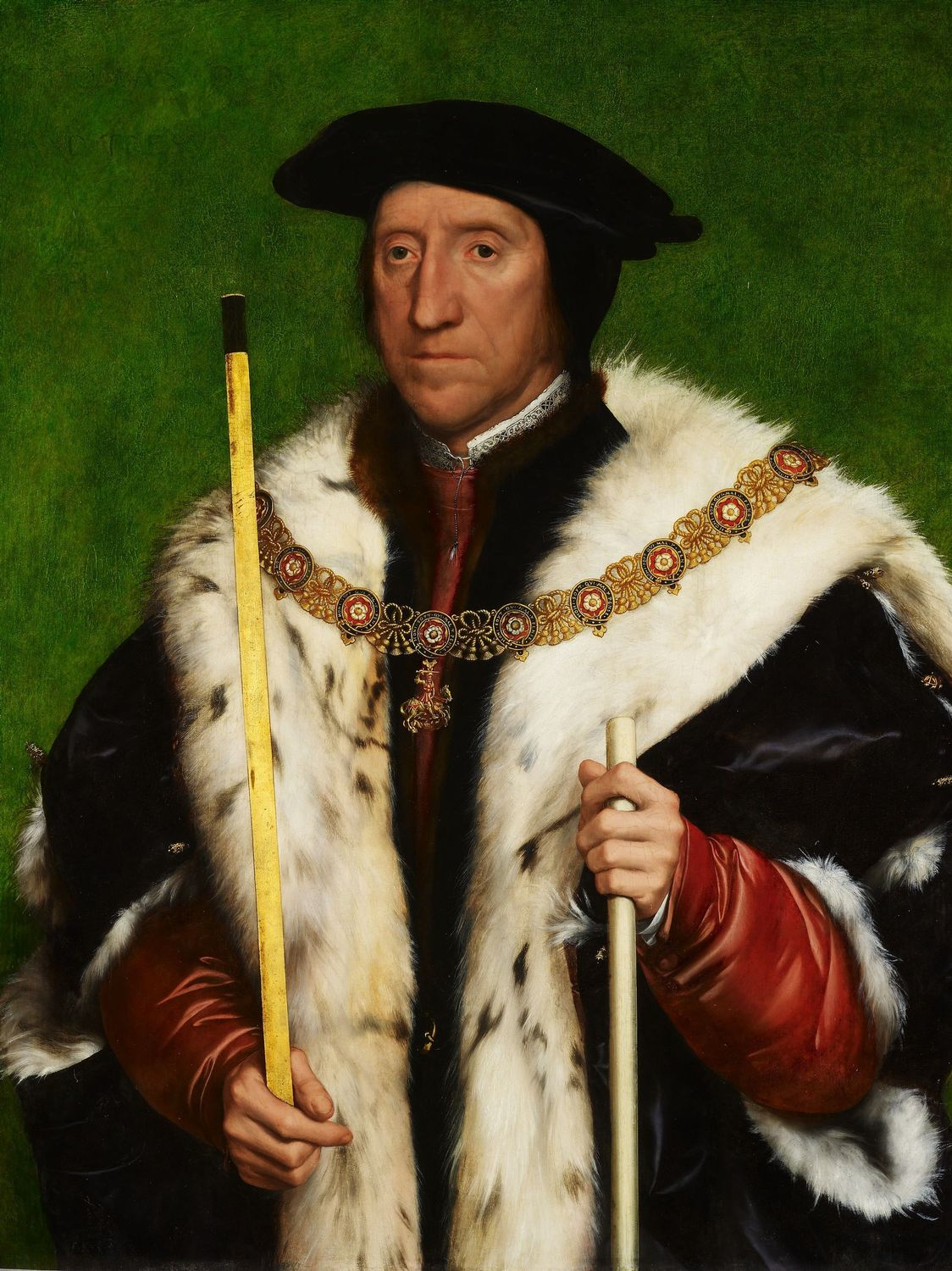
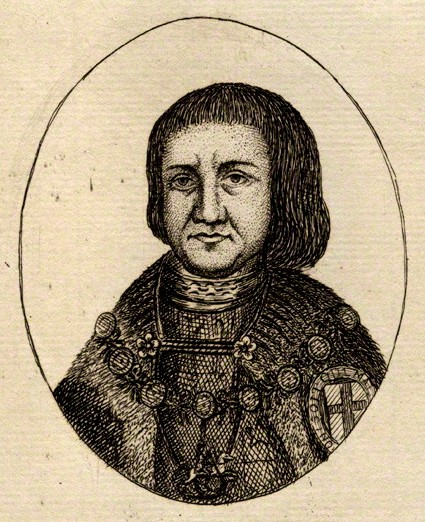
Thomas Howard, 3rd Duke of Norfolk and John de Vere, 15th Earl of Oxford, Jane's paternal and maternal grandfathers

Jane was born between 1533 and 1537, and it is likely toward the latter end, being the first or second of five children of Henry Howard, Earl of Surrey and his wife Lady Frances de Vere. Her grandparents on her father's side were Thomas Howard, 3rd Duke of Norfolk, and Elizabeth Stafford. Her maternal grandparents were John de Vere, 15th Earl of Oxford, and Elizabeth Trussell.

Jane Howard had two brothers, Thomas Howard, 4th Duke of Norfolk, and Henry Howard, 1st Earl of Northampton, and two sisters, Katherine Howard, who married Henry Berkeley, 7th Baron Berkeley, and Margaret Howard, who married Henry Scrope, 9th Baron Scrope of Bolton. Jane Howard's youngest sister Margaret was born after their father's execution.

== Life ==
Jane Howard's father, the Earl of Surrey, was tried and convicted of treason at the Guildhall on 13 January 1547 and beheaded on Tower Hill on 19 January 1547. In 1548, his children were placed in the care of their aunt Mary FitzRoy, who appointed the martyrologist John Foxe as their tutor. Under Foxe, Jane learned Latin and Greek to the level that she could "compete with the most learned men of the age."

Despite being educated by Foxe, who was a well-known Protestant, Jane was Roman Catholic as were most of her family (his father had fallen out of favour in part because he was a Catholic and his grandfather, the 3rd Duke of Norfolk had been a prisoner in the Tower from the end of the reign of Henry VIII and was kept there throughout the reign of Edward VI for the same reason; he was released early in the rule of the Catholic Queen Mary I).

About 1563/1564 Jane Howard married Charles Neville, 6th Earl of Westmorland, who had succeeded to the earldom after his father's death on 10 February 1564. In November 1569, Westmorland joined the Earl of Northumberland in the Northern Rebellion. After initial successes, Westmorland and Northumberland were forced to flee to the Scottish border when Queen Elizabeth I sent forces north under the Earl of Sussex. Sussex proclaimed Westmorland and Northumberland rebels at York on 19 November. Shortly thereafter Northumberland was handed to the Scottish Regent, the Earl of Moray. However, Westmorland was given refuge by Lord Kerr at Ferniehirst Castle in Roxburghshire, and he eventually escaped by sea in 1570 to the Spanish Netherlands, where he remained an exile until his death. In 1571, he was attainted, and all his honours forfeited. After her husband's attainder, Jane was grannted a pension by the queen of £200 for life.

In the events which preceded the Northern Rebellion in 1569, the countess had more to do with raising the troops than her husband did. She was well educated but perhaps not the clever when it came to understanding political machinations. She was first to urge the rebels to rise against Elizabeth, yet she expected the Queen to pardon her when they failed.

The countess hoped to arrange the marriage of her brother, Thomas Howard, 4th Duke of Norfolk, to Mary, Queen of Scots, and put them both on England's throne and along with it, the Catholic religion would be restored in England. This would also restore her own position in society and that of her daughters. Norfolk was executed for treason in 1572, and she lived under house arrest for the rest of her life.

The countess was buried 30 June 1593 at Kenninghall, Norfolk.

Westmorland continued to be involved for many years in plots to invade England and replace Queen Elizabeth with Mary, Queen of Scots. In 1599, he considered marrying again. His prospective bride was the daughter of President Richardot. Westmorland died 16 November 1601 at Nieuwpoort, Flanders. On 25 June 1604, two of his daughters, Katherine and Anne, were granted pensions of 200 marks a year by King James. Westmorland's cousin Edmund Neville, the only son of Richard Neville (d. 27 May 1590) by Barbara Arden, the daughter of William Arden of Park Hall, Warwickshire, unsuccessfully claimed the earldom.

== Marriage and issue ==
On 28 August 1564, Jane Howard married Charles Neville, 6th Earl of Westmorland, the second but only surviving son of Henry Neville, 5th Earl of Westmorland, by his first wife, Anne Manners, the second daughter of Thomas Manners, 1st Earl of Rutland, by Eleanor Paston, daughter of Sir William Paston (died c. 20 September 1554). Jane and Charles were second cousins because Howard's grandmother, Lady Elizabeth Stafford was the sister of Lady Katherine, Neville's paternal grandmother. The couple had a son and four daughters:

- Lord Neville (1569 – died 21 April 1571), whose first name is unknown
- Margaret Neville, who married Nicholas Pudsey
- Katherine Neville, who married Sir Thomas Grey of Chillingham, Northumberland, and died without issue
- Anne Neville, who married Sir David Ingleby, a younger son of Sir William Ingleby of Ripley, Yorkshire, and died without male issue
- Eleanor Neville, who died unmarried before 25 June 1604
