= Earl Soham =

Coordinates: 52.22°N 01.26°E

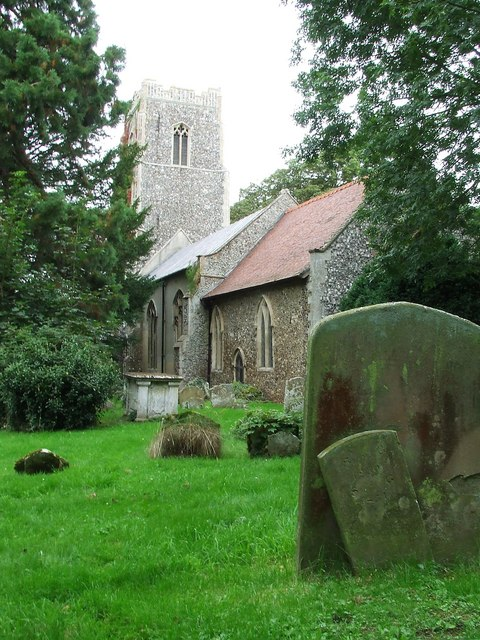
- Earl Soham, Church of St Mary

- Location within Suffolk
- Population: 455 (2011)
- OS grid reference: TM2363
- District: East Suffolk
- Shire county: Suffolk
- Region: East
- Country: England
- Sovereign state: United Kingdom
- Post town: Woodbridge
- Postcode district: IP13
- Police: Suffolk
- Fire: Suffolk
- Ambulance: East of England
- UK Parliament: Central Suffolk and North Ipswich

Earl Soham is a small settlement in Suffolk, England. It is on the A1120 road and is 4 kilometres (2 mi) west of the town of Framlingham.

Earl Soham once belonged to the Earls of Norfolk, the Bigod family (sometimes spelt "Bigot" in old texts), who also owned nearby Framlingham Castle. Edward I granted Roger Bigod permission to hold a market and a lamb and stock fair in the village. The parish was in the hundred of Loes well before 1086. The church dates from about 1320 (chancel) with the nave dated to about 1470 (Kelly's Suffolk Directory 1900) and a perpendicular west tower c. 1475. The Baptist Chapel was built around 1863. The school was first built in 1850. Earl Soham Lodge was originally a hunting lodge, built in the 13th century but rebuilt in 1789. For many years it was the seat of the Cornwallis family. The population of the village peaked in the 19th century with over 750 inhabitants.

Sir Auckland Colvin, colonial administrator in India and Egypt, is buried in the village churchyard.

== Governance ==
An electoral ward in the same name exists. This ward stretches south to Charsfield with a total population taken at the 2011 census of 2,144.

== Notable residents ==
- Thomas Browne, Archdeacon of Ipswich
- Nicholas Peke, one of the Ipswich Martyrs
- Thomas Steyning, Member of Parliament for Castle Rising in 1559.
- Robert Groome, Archdeacon of Suffolk
- Auckland Colvin, colonial administrator in India and Egypt
- Patricia Highsmith, US Born Crime writer between 1964 and 1967, at Bridge Cottage
