= Charles Seckford =

English politician (1551–1592)

Charles Seckford (1551–1592), of Great Bealings, Suffolk, was an English politician. He was a member (MP) of the parliament of England for Aldeburgh in 1572.

Charles married Mary, daughter of Thomas Steyning and Frances de Vere.
