= Henry Neville, 5th Earl of Westmorland =

English peer

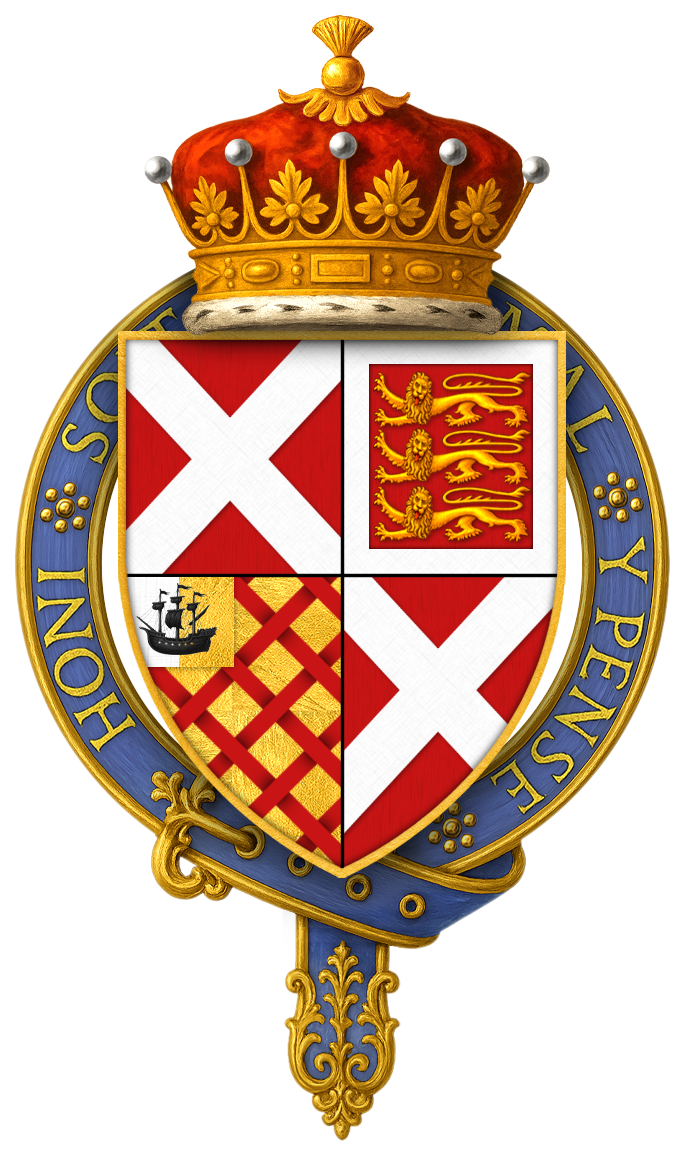
Arms of Sir Henry Neville, 5th Earl of Westmorland, KG

Henry Neville, 5th Earl of Westmorland (1525–Aug 1563) was an English peer, member of the House of Lords and Knight of the Garter.

== Life ==
He was born in 1525, the eldest son of Ralph Neville, 4th Earl of Westmorland and his wife, Katherine Stafford. Katherine's father was Edward Stafford, 3rd Duke of Buckingham; her mother was Eleanor Percy, Duchess of Buckingham.

Henry Neville was knighted in 1544 and inherited the earldom from his father in 1550. He was made a member of the Privy Council around 1552 and ambassador to Scotland the same year. He became a Knight of the Garter and lord-lieutenant of Durham on 7 May 1552. Upon the death of Edward VI, Neville supported Mary I and participated in her coronation ceremony, carrying, with the Earl of Cumberland, swords representing spiritual and temporal justice. From January 1558 to December 1559 he was lieutenant-general of the north.

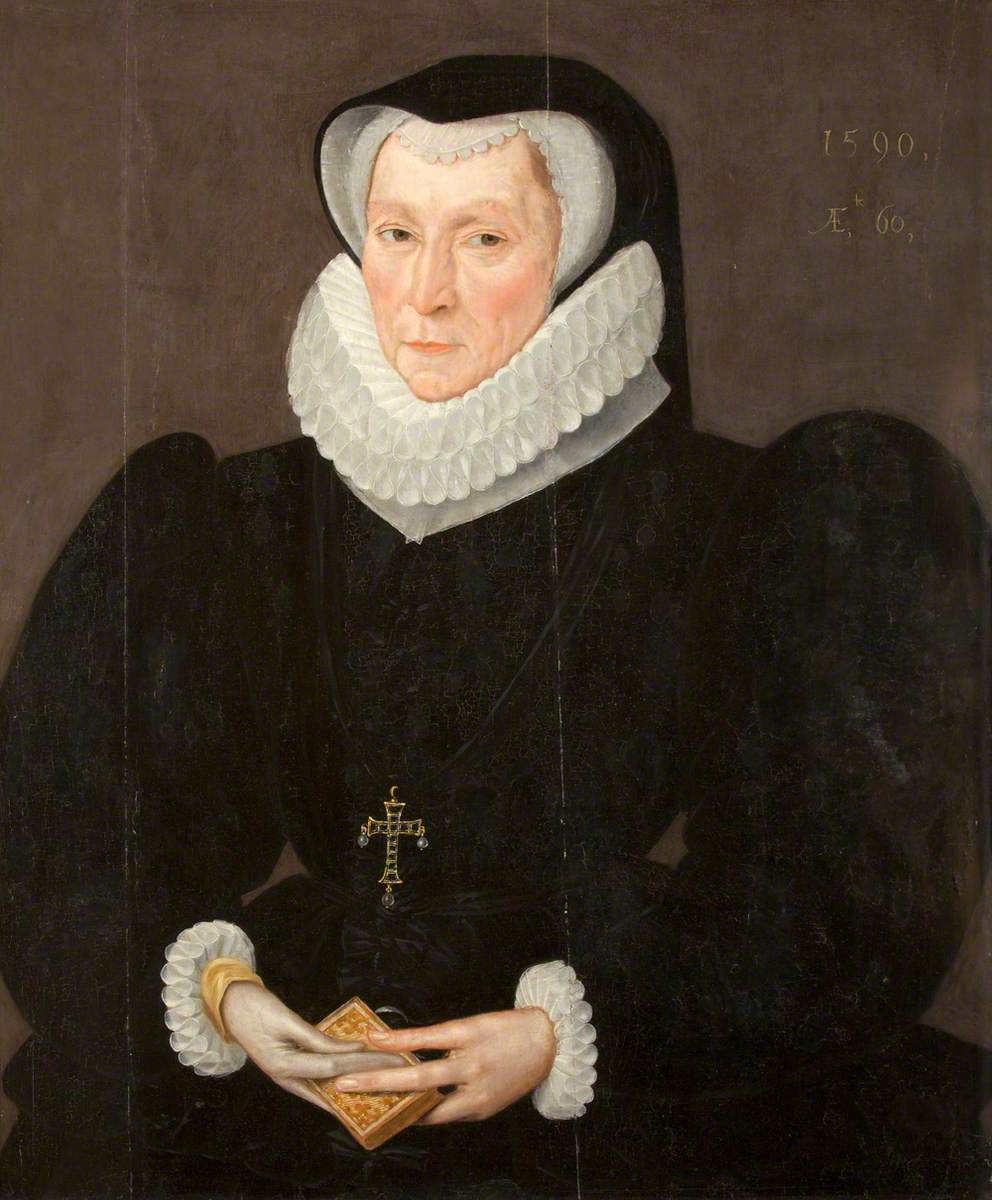
Portrait of Lady Catherine Neville (b.1529/1530), Lady Constable, Aged 60 by Robert Peake the Elder, 1590, located at Lytes Cary Manor, Somerset. It is inscribed on the upper right: 1590 aet 60. A half-length portrait of Catherine Constable, at the age of 60, facing, in black dress and hood, white ruff and cuffs, a gold prayer book in both hands.

His first wife was Anne Manners, daughter of Thomas Manners, 1st Earl of Rutland. Their daughter Eleanor married William Pelham. Another daughter, Catherine, married as his second wife, Sir John Constable. A second portrait of Catherine by Robert Peake the Elder, dated 1590, resides at Burton Constable Hall.

His second wife was Jane, the daughter of Sir Roger Cholmeley; thirdly he married her sister Margaret, the widow of Sir Henry Gascoigne.

Henry Neville died in August 1563 and was succeeded by his son by Anne Manners, Charles Neville, 6th Earl of Westmorland.

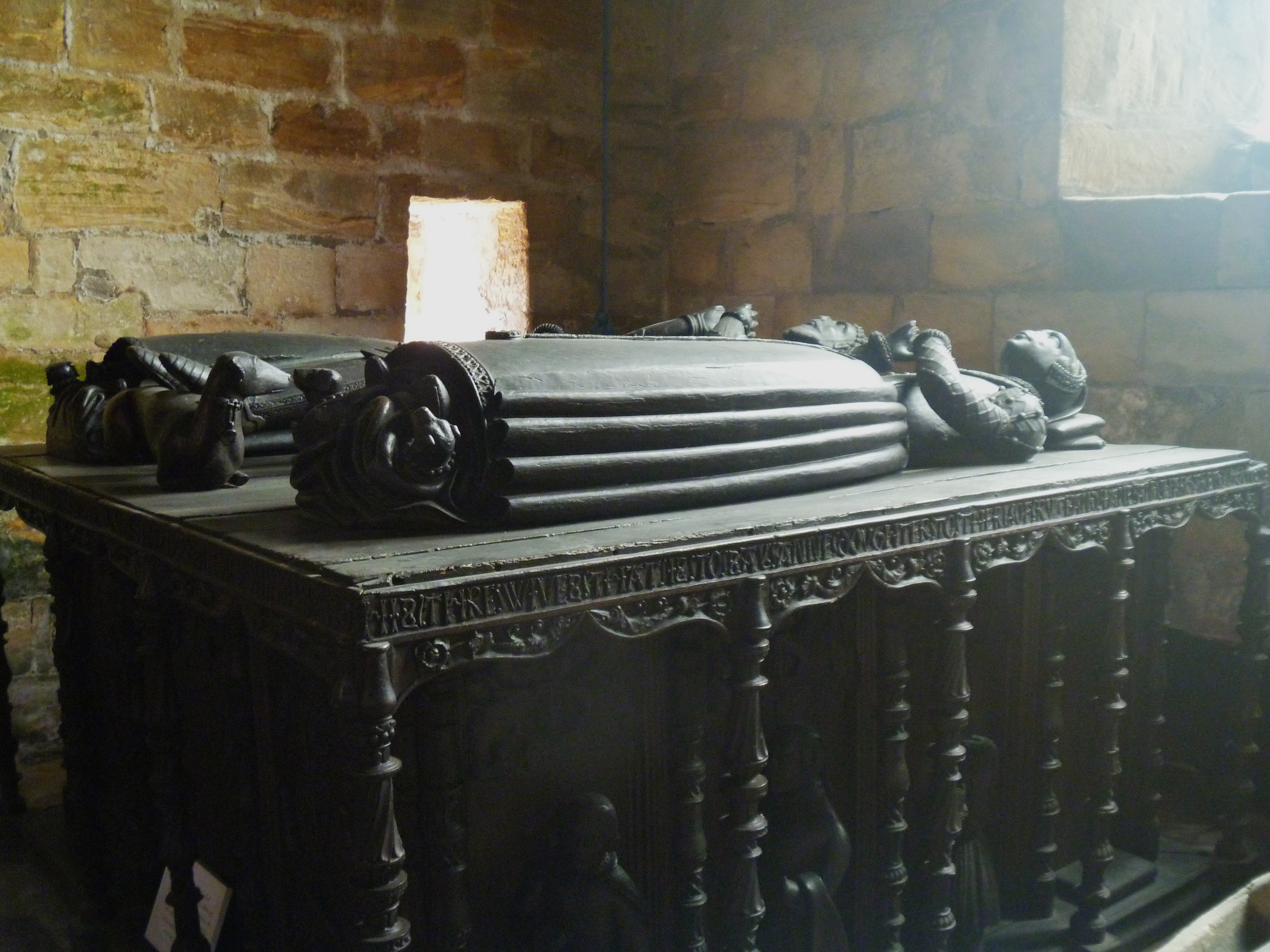
Wooden chest tomb of Henry Neville in St Mary's Church, Staindrop

Peerage of England
Preceded by Ralph Neville	Earl of Westmorland; 1549–1564	Succeeded by Charles Neville
