= Kenninghall =

Village in Norfolk, England

Coordinates: 52.4385°N 0.9924°E

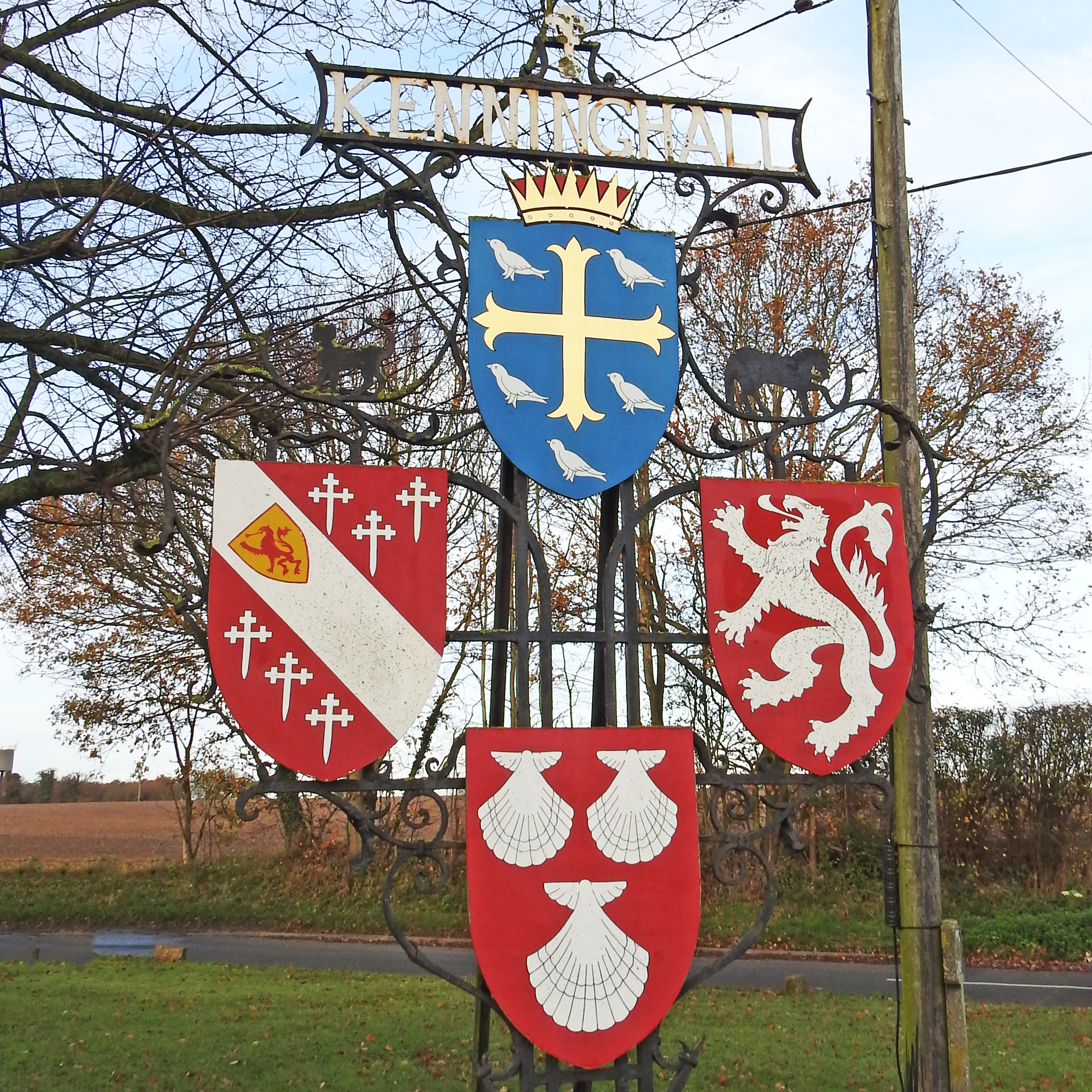
- Kenninghall Village Sign

- Location within Norfolk
- Area: 5.73 sq mi (14.8 km^{2})
- Population: 1,028 (2021 census)
  - Density: 179/sq mi (69/km^{2})
- OS grid reference: TM034865
- Civil parish: Kenninghall
- District: Breckland
- Shire county: Norfolk
- Region: East
- Country: England
- Sovereign state: United Kingdom
- Post town: Norwich
- Postcode district: NR16
- Dialling code: 01953
- Police: Norfolk
- Fire: Norfolk
- Ambulance: East of England
- UK Parliament: South West Norfolk
- Website: http://www.kenninghall.org.uk/

Kenninghall is a village and civil parish in the English county of Norfolk.

Kenninghall is located 6.5 miles (10.5 km) north-west of Diss and 18 miles (29 km) south-west of Norwich.

== Correct pronunciation ==
In the local Norfolk dialect, Kenninghall is pronounced "Kennyle".

== History ==
Kenninghall's name is of Anglo-Saxon origin and derives from the Old English for the nook of land of Cena's people. Another theory links the name to the Saxon "cyning" for king, suggesting a meaning of "King's House".

In the Domesday Book, Kenninghall is listed as a settlement of 36 households in the hundred of Guiltcross. In 1086, the village was divided between the East Anglian estates of King William I and William d'Ecouis.

The manor of Kenninghall found its way into the ownership of the Howard family who held the title of Dukes of Norfolk. The family originally lived at East Hall which was demolished around 1520 and replaced by Kenninghall Place. The palace was built in an 'H' style and was demolished in 1650 though some parts of it remain.

In 1836, the Guiltcross Union House was built in Kenninghall which was to serve as a workhouse for the surrounding area. By 1916, it was serving as an institute for 'mentally defective boys' and was later used to house German prisoners of war during the Second World War.

== Geography ==
According to the 2021 census, Kenninghall has a population of 1,028 people which shows an increase from the 941 people recorded in the 2011 census.

== St. Mary's Church ==
Kenninghall's parish church is dedicated to Saint Mary and dates from the Fourteenth Century. St. Mary's is located on Church Street and has been Grade I listed since 1958. The church holds Sunday service twice a month.

St. Mary's holds a rare set of royal arms from the reign of Queen Elizabeth I as well as a set from the reign of King Charles I. The church also holds a good set of modern stained-glass windows.

== Amenities ==
Kenninghall Primary School is located on North Lopham Road and is part of the Enrich Learning Trust. The headteacher is Mr. L. Ambrose.

== Notable residents ==
- Jane Howard, Countess of Westmorland- (1533-1593) noblewoman, died and buried in Kenninghall.
- Elizabeth Leyburne, Duchess of Norfolk- (1536-1567) noblewoman, died in Kenninghall.
- Oliver Bernard- (1925-2013) poet and translator, lived and died in Kenninghall.

== War Memorial ==
Kenninghall's war memorials are a set of marble plaques in St. Mary's Church which list the following names for the First World War:

Rank	Name	Unit	Date of death	Burial/Commemoration
Bdr.	James T. Fulcher	124th Bde., Royal Field Artillery	24 Apr. 1917	Arras Memorial
Cpl.	Henry J. Williams	12th Royal Lancers	15 Apr. 1917	Duisans British Cemetery
Gnr.	Frederick W. Wells	111th Bty., Royal Garrison Artillery	20 Jun. 1917	Voormezeele Cemetery
Pte.	William J. Claxton	3rd Bn., Coldstream Guards	15 Sep. 1916	Thiepval Memorial
Pte.	Samuel Davison	1st Bn., Essex Regiment	13 Aug. 1915	Helles Memorial
Pte.	George W. Mitson	RMns att. HMS Indefatigable	31 May 1916	Plymouth Naval Memorial
Pte.	William A. Fenn	2/10th Bn., Middlesex Regiment	3 Nov. 1917	Jerusalem Memorial
Pte.	John W. Ward	2nd Bn., Norfolk Regiment	14 Apr. 1915	Basra War Cemetery
Pte.	William T. Wilson	3rd Bn., Norfolk Regt.	30 Dec. 1917	Chatby Memorial
Pte.	Cecil J. Wells	7th Bn., Norfolk Regt.	13 Oct. 1915	Loos Memorial
Pte.	Stanley Barrett	8th Bn., Norfolk Regt.	11 Aug. 1917	Menin Gate
Pte.	Henry J. Witham	8th Bn., Norfolk Regt.	11 Aug. 1917	Menin Gate
Pte.	William A. Bilham	9th Bn., Norfolk Regt.	20 Nov. 1917	Ribécourt British Cemetery
Pte.	Ernest W. Bush	9th Bn., Norfolk Regt.	20 Nov. 1917	Fifteen Ravine Cemetery
Pte.	Edward Francis	9th Bn., Norfolk Regt.	15 Sep. 1916	Thiepval Memorial
Pte.	George Francis	11th Bn., Queen's Own Regiment	27 Oct. 1916	Warlencourt British Cemetery
Pte.	Frederick Burrows	5th Bn., Shropshire Light Infantry	25 Sep. 1915	Menin Gate
Rfn.	Lennox Cunningham	23rd (County) Bn., London Regt.	13 Dec. 1917	Jerusalem War Cemetery

The following names were added after the Second World War:

Rank	Name	Unit	Date of death	Burial/Commemoration
LAC	Ronald Trudgill	Royal Air Force Volunteer Reserve	26 Jan. 1945	Nicosia War Cemetery
St1C	Sydney G. Cunningham	HMS Grenade (Destroyer)	30 May 1940	St. Mary's Churchyard
A2C	Stanley C. Rolfe	No. 912 Balloon Squadron RAF	16 Nov. 1939	St. Mary's Churchyard
Gnr.	Albert Collings	10 Bty., Royal Artillery	29 Jun. 1944	Plymouth Naval Memorial
Pte.	Ernest Trudgill	Royal Norfolk Regiment	7 Mar. 1946	St. Mary's Churchyard
Pte.	Edward H. Ringer	6th Bn., Royal Norfolks	18 Feb. 1941	St. Mary's Churchyard
Pte.	George H. Taylor	6th Bn., Queen's Royal Regiment	16 Jun. 1944	Bayeux War Cemetery
