= Feudal barony of Stafford =

Feudal barony in England

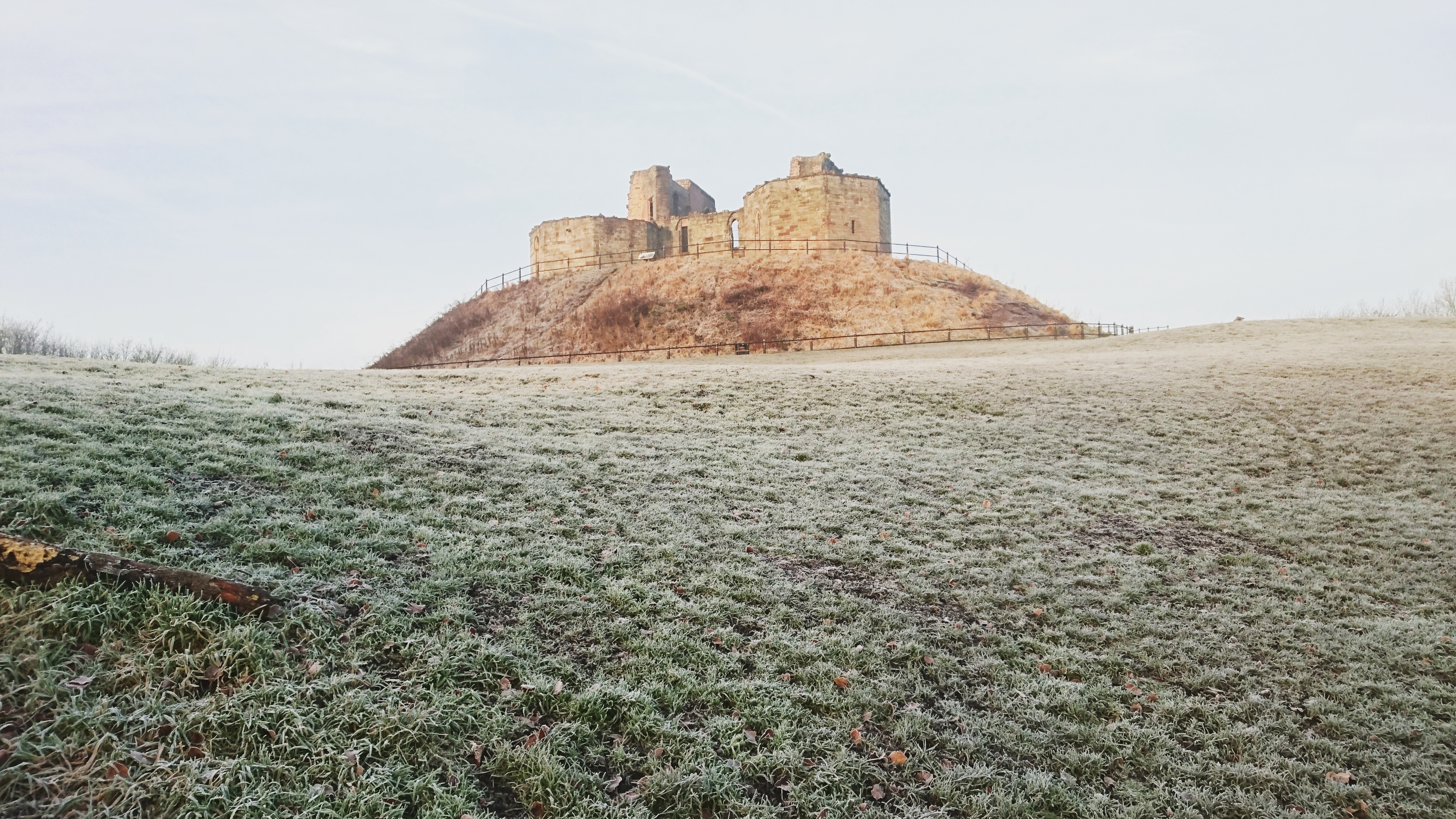
Stafford Castle, seat of the feudal barony of Stafford. Almost the entire surviving building dates from a reconstruction in 1813 by the Jerningham family

The feudal barony of Stafford was a feudal barony the caput of which was at Stafford Castle in Staffordshire, England. The feudal barons were subsequently created Barons Stafford (1299) by writ, Earls of Stafford (1351) and Dukes of Buckingham (1444). After the execution of the 3rd Duke in 1521, and his posthumous attainder, the castle and manor of Stafford escheated to the crown, and all the peerage titles were forfeited. However the castle and manor of Stafford were recovered ten years later in 1531 by his eldest son Henry Stafford, 1st Baron Stafford (1501-1563), who was created a baron in 1547. His descendants, much reduced in wealth and prestige, retained possession of Stafford Castle and the widow of the 4th Baron was still seated there during the Civil War when shortly after 1643 it was destroyed by Parliamentarian forces. By the time of the 6th Baron Stafford (d.1640) the family had sunken into poverty and obscurity, and in 1639 he suffered the indignity of being requested by King Charles I to surrender his title on account of his "having no parte of the inheritance of the said Lord Stafford not any other landes or means whatsoever". On his death the following year, unmarried and without issue, the senior male line of the Stafford family was extinguished. However a vestige of the feudal barony may be deemed to have continued in the families of later owners of the manor of Stafford and site of the Castle, after the abolition of feudal tenure in 1661.

== Descent ==
The descent of the feudal barons of Stafford is recorded, amongst other places, in the Rimed Chronicle of Stone Priory, a verse of unknown date which was found inscribed on a tablet hanging at Stone Priory (founded by the 1st feudal baron) in 1537 at the time of the Dissolution of the Monasteries and transcribed and printed by Dugdale in his Monasticon Anglicanum. Modern standard sources (which largely agree with it) state the descent as follows:

=== de Tosny/de Stafford ===
- Robert de Stafford (c.1039–c.1100) (alias Robert de Tosny/Toeni, etc.) an Anglo-Norman nobleman who arrived in England during or shortly after the Norman Conquest of 1066 and was awarded by King William the Conqueror 131 manors in his newly conquered kingdom, predominantly in the county of Staffordshire. He built Stafford Castle as his seat. His 131 landholdings are listed in the Domesday Book of 1086. By his wife, believed to have been Avice de Clare, he left a son and heir:
- Nicholas I de Stafford (d.circa 1138), eldest son and heir, 2nd feudal baron of Stafford, the descent from whom was as follows (all successive feudal barons of Stafford):
- Robert II de Stafford (d.1177/85), son and heir;
- Robert III de Stafford (d.1193/4), son and heir, died without issue.
- Millicent de Stafford, sister and heiress, wife of Hervey/Harvey I Bagot (d.1214). Harvey "had to pay so heavy a fine to Coeur de Lion for permission to marry this heiress, and obtain livery of her lands, that he was forced to sell Drayton — one of her manors — to the canons of St. Thomas". Her younger son was William Stafford of "Broomshull" (Bramshall near Uttoxeter, Staffordshire, a Bagot possession), ancestor of several prominent Stafford lines, most notably Stafford of Hooke in Dorset, Stafford of Southwick in the parish of North Bradley, Wiltshire and Stafford of Grafton in the parish of Bromsgrove, Worcestershire.

=== Bagot/de Stafford ===
Arms of Stafford, adopted at the start of the age of heraldry (c.1200-1215), probably by Harvey II de Stafford (d.1237) (son of Harvey I Bagot (d.1214) by his wife the heiress Millicent de Stafford), said to be the founder of the Stafford family: Or, a chevron gules

- Henry/Harvey II de Stafford (d.1237), son and heir of his mother, who adopted his maternal surname in lieu of his patronymic and married Pernel, daughter of William de Ferrers, 3rd Earl of Derby (d.1190). He is said to be the founder of the Stafford family "one of the loftiest of our English houses, which rose to the highest point of splendour only to fall to the other extreme of reverse."
- Harvey III de Stafford (d.1241), son and heir, who died without issue.
- Robert IV de Stafford (d.1261), brother and heir;
- Nicholas II de Stafford (1255-1282), son and heir.
- Edmund de Stafford, 1st Baron Stafford (1272/3-1308), son and heir, summoned to parliament by writ on 6 February 1299 by King Edward I, by which he is deemed to have become the 1st Baron Stafford. He married Margaret Basset, daughter of Ralph Basset, 1st Lord Basset of Drayton (d.1299) of Drayton Bassett in Staffordshire. His younger son was Richard Stafford, ancestor of the Staffords of Clifton, barons by writ in 1371, which family expired early in the following century.
- Ralph de Stafford, 1st Earl of Stafford, 2nd Baron Stafford (1301–1372), KG, son and heir, created Earl of Stafford in 1351, one of the Founder Knights of the Garter, who married Margaret de Audley, daughter and heiress of Hugh de Audley, 1st Earl of Gloucester (d. 1347). Ancestor of Humphrey Stafford, 1st Duke of Buckingham, 6th Earl of Stafford (1402-1460), of Stafford Castle.
- Hugh de Stafford, 2nd Earl of Stafford, 3rd Baron Stafford (c. 1342–1386), eldest son of the 1st Earl
- Thomas Stafford, 3rd Earl of Stafford, 4th Baron Stafford (c. 1368–1392), second son of the 2nd Earl
- William Stafford, 4th Earl of Stafford, 5th Baron Stafford (1375–1395), third son of the 2nd Earl
- Edmund Stafford, 5th Earl of Stafford, 6th Baron Stafford (1378–1403), fifth son of the 2nd Earl
- Humphrey Stafford, 1st Duke of Buckingham, 6th Earl of Stafford, 7th Baron Stafford (1402–1460), created 1st Duke of Buckingham in 1444
- Henry Stafford, 2nd Duke of Buckingham (1455–1483), grandson of the 1st Duke, was attainted for treason in 1483.
- Edward Stafford, 3rd Duke of Buckingham (1477–1521), eldest son of the 2nd Duke, was restored to his father's honours in 1485. In 1511 he built himself a new grand residence at Thornbury Castle in Gloucestershire, but retained Stafford Castle. He was executed for treason in 1521 and posthumously attainted in 1523, under King Henry VIII. The family's estates escheated to the crown.
- Henry Stafford, 1st Baron Stafford (1501-1563), eldest son of the 3rd Duke by his wife Eleanor Percy, a daughter of Henry Percy, 4th Earl of Northumberland. He had accompanied King Henry VIII to the Field of the Cloth of Gold in 1520, but his father was executed for treason the next year, and attainted. In 1522 he managed to recover some of his paternal estates, although in 1529 he claimed to have been boarding for the four previous years in an Abbey with his wife and seven children. on 15 July 1531, although still deemed "corrupt in blood" he received from Henry VIII a grant of the Castle and manor of Stafford, forfeited by his father, after which he was known as "Henry, Lord Stafford", even though not a peer. However, in 1547, under the infant King Edward VI, he was restored in blood and raised to the peerage as Baron Stafford, albeit then taking his place as last among the barons. In 1554, in consideration for his service in the Duke of Northumberland's Rebellion, he was granted his father's former estate at Thornbury Castle and elsewhere. In 1558 his new title was recognized as carrying precedence from the barony of 1299, and he was promoted in seniority to after Baron Talbot, but the new title, unlike the old, descended only via the male line. His sister was married to Thomas Howard, 3rd Duke of Norfolk (1473-1554) an uncle of two of the wives of King Henry VIII, namely Anne Boleyn and Catherine Howard, both of whom were beheaded, and played a major role in the machinations affecting these royal marriages. After falling from favour in 1546, he was stripped of the dukedom and imprisoned in the Tower of London, avoiding execution when Henry VIII died on 28 January 1547.
- Henry Stafford, 2nd Baron Stafford (c.1534-1566), eldest surviving son and heir, a Member of Parliament for the prestigious county seat of Shropshire. He married Elizabeth Davy, of Holbeach in Lincolnshire, but produced no issue. He died at Stafford Castle in 1566 and was buried at St Mary's Church, Stafford.
- Edward Stafford, 3rd Baron Stafford (1536–1603), brother, born at Stafford Castle. He served as a Member of Parliament for the borough of Stafford (1558-9) and later trained as a lawyer at the Middle Temple. He married Mary Stanley (d.1609), a daughter of Edward Stanley, 3rd Earl of Derby, by his wife Katherine Howard, a daughter of the 3rd Duke of Norfolk. He died in 1603 and was buried at St Mary's Church, Stafford. His wife survived him and was buried in 1609 at Thornbury, where survives her monument.
- Edward Stafford, 4th Baron Stafford (1572–1625), buried at the Castle Church, Stafford. During the early phases of the Civil War in 1643 Stafford Castle was held by his widow Lady Isabel Stafford (née Isabel Forster), a staunch Roman Catholic and Royalist. The Parliamentarians had captured the town of Stafford on 15 May 1643, following a brief siege, but some of its garrison escaped and held Stafford Castle, in the hope of using it as a bridgehead to recapture the town. Colonel William Brereton rode up to the castle with some of his men and called upon Lady Stafford to surrender, to which she refused. In response "some of the poor outhouses were set on fire to try whether these would work their spirits to any relenting. All in vain, for from the castle they shot some of our men and horses which did much enrage and provoke the rest to a fierce revenge. Almost all the dwelling houses and outhouses were burnt to the ground." The siege was raised when Colonel Hastings led a relief column which arrived on 5 June. Lady Stafford was eventually persuaded to leave, a small garrison remaining to defend the castle against a renewed siege.
- Henry Stafford, 5th Baron Stafford (1621–1637), grandson. His sister Mary Stafford (1619–1694) married William Howard (1614–1680), second surviving son of Thomas Howard, 14th Earl of Arundel, and following the extinction of the male line of the Stafford family (on the death in 1640 of Roger Stafford, 6th Baron Stafford (see below)) both were created jointly Baron Stafford.
- Roger Stafford, 6th Baron Stafford (c. 1573–1640), distant cousin, only son of Richard Stafford (a younger son of Henry Stafford, 1st Baron Stafford) by his wife Mary Corbet, a daughter of John Corbet (c.1500-1555) of Lee in Shropshire, MP for Shropshire in 1539. Corbet was a descendant of the powerful Norman family of Corbet, marcher lords and feudal barons of Caus Castle in Shropshire, the ownership of which had at some time passed to the Staffords. In 1523 John Corbet served as a receiver of the lands of the attainted 3rd Duke and was appointed as steward of Caus by the latter's son Henry Stafford, 1st Baron Stafford. Roger Stafford succeeded to the title aged about 64 but two years later in 1639 was requested by King Charles I to surrender his title on account of his poverty "having no parte of the inheritance of the said Lord Stafford not any other landes or means whatsoever". It was said that the king wanted to bestow the prestigious title of Stafford on the Howard family, Earls of Arundel, and that Roger, by then an old man, was held prisoner until his death by the Howards in Arundel House in London to prevent him marrying and continuing his line. On his death unmarried and without issue, the barony and the senior male line of the illustrious family of Stafford became extinct.

== Landholdings ==
The first feudal baron held 131 manors as listed in the Domesday Book of 1086, a high proportion lying in Staffordshire. They included Barlaston and Bradley in Staffordshire and part of Duns Tew in Oxfordshire.

== End of the Stafford family ==
The feudal barony descended with the ownership of Stafford Castle, which eventually passed out of the Stafford family. The peak of the Stafford family was reached by Edward Stafford, 3rd Duke of Buckingham (1477–1521), who was executed for treason in 1521, on whose death "the princely House of Stafford fell to rise no more". Cleveland relates the descent of his progeny into obscurity and poverty as follows:

His only son, stripped alike of lands and dignities, received back a small fraction of its splendid possessions, with a seat and voice in parliament as a baron, and this title was borne by several generations. Edward, fourth Lord Stafford, "basely married to his mother's chambermaid," was succeeded by his grandson Henry, with whom the direct line terminated in 1637; and the claim of the last remaining heir, Roger, was rejected by the House of Lords on account of his poverty. This unfortunate man, the great-grandson of the last Duke, was then sixty-five, and had sunk into so abject a condition that he felt ashamed of bearing his own name, and long passed as Fludd, or Floyde, having, it is supposed, assumed the patronymic of one of his uncle's servants, who had reared and sheltered him in early life. He was compelled to surrender his barony to Charles I, and died unmarried in 1640; leaving an only sister, Jane, who in spite of her Plantagenet blood married a joiner, and had a son gaining a poor livelihood as a cobbler in 1637 at Newport in Shropshire".
