= William Stafford (courtier) =

English politician and courtier (c. 1508–1556)

Sir William Stafford
- Born: c. 1508
- Died: 5 May 1556 (aged 47-48); Geneva, Switzerland
- Buried: Unknown
- Noble family: Stafford
- Spouses: Mary Boleyn (m. 1534; died 1543) Dorothy Stafford (m. 1545)
- Issue: Sir Edward Stafford; William Stafford; Sir John Stafford; Elizabeth Stafford; Ursula Stafford; Dorothy Stafford
- Father: Sir Humphrey Stafford
- Mother: Margaret Fogge

Sir William Stafford, of Chebsey, in Staffordshire (c. 1508 – 5 May 1556) was an Essex landowner and the second husband of Mary Boleyn, who was the sister of Anne Boleyn, Queen of England. Mary was one-time mistress of King Henry VIII.

== Biography ==
Stafford was the second son of Sir Humphrey Stafford (died 22 September 1545) of Cottered and Rushden, Hertfordshire, by his first wife, Margaret Fogge, daughter of Sir John Fogge of Ashford, Kent. His family belonged to a younger, Blatherwycke cadet branch of the mighty Stafford family, which held the Dukedom of Buckingham and the Earldom of Wiltshire until the fall from grace and execution of Edward Stafford, 3rd Duke of Buckingham. Though born to a prominent family of landed gentry, Stafford was a mere gentleman and only a second son, and thus served Henry VIII as a soldier.

In 1532, Stafford was listed as one of the two hundred people who accompanied Henry VIII to France. The purpose of the journey was for Henry and his fiancée, Anne Boleyn, to meet with Francis I so that he might show his public support and approval for the annulment of Henry's first marriage to Catherine of Aragon. Among the other travellers was Anne Boleyn's sister, Mary Boleyn, the eldest daughter of Thomas Boleyn, who was by then the Earl of both Wiltshire and Ormonde. With her connections, Mary had excellent marriage prospects. Nonetheless, Mary and Stafford married in secret in 1534. When the marriage was discovered after Mary became pregnant, the couple were banished from court.

The couple initially lived at Chebsey in Staffordshire, but later moved to the Boleyn family home, Rochford Hall at Rochford, in Essex. They lived in relative obscurity until Mary died in 1543, after which Stafford served in Scotland. He was knighted there in 1545 - during the reign of Henry VIII - and, two years later, became an MP for Hastings. Also in 1545, Stafford remarried, this time to his second cousin, Dorothy Stafford, the youngest daughter of Henry Stafford, 1st Baron Stafford and Ursula Pole (died 1570).

During the reign of Mary I, Stafford and his family fled to Geneva. He died there on 5 May 1556, not living to see the reign of his first wife's niece, Elizabeth I, or to see his wife, children, and stepchildren become influential courtiers in Elizabeth's court.

== Marriages and issue ==
In 1534, William Stafford secretly wed, as her second husband, Mary Boleyn (c. 1499 – 1543), sister of King Henry VIII's second wife, Anne Boleyn. Mary Boleyn is said to have been pregnant at the time of her marriage to Sir William Stafford and they may have had two children:

- Edward Stafford (1535–1545).
- Anne Stafford (b. 1536?), possibly named in honour of Mary's sister, Queen Anne Boleyn.

However if these children did exist, nothing further is known of them.

Stafford married secondly, in 1545, Dorothy Stafford (d. 22 September 1604), daughter of Henry Stafford, 1st Baron Stafford, and Ursula Pole, by whom he had three sons and three daughters:

- Elizabeth Stafford (1546 – 6 February 1599), who married firstly, Sir William Drury (1550–1590), by whom she had issue. She married secondly Sir John Scott.
- Sir Edward Stafford (1552–1604) of Grafton, who married firstly, Roberta Chapman (died 1578), the daughter of Alexander Chapman of Rainthorpe Hall, Norfolk, by whom he had a son and two daughters, and secondly, on 29 November 1597, Douglas Sheffield (1547–1608), daughter of William Howard, 1st Baron Howard of Effingham, and sister of Charles Howard, 1st Earl of Nottingham.
- Ursula Stafford (born 1553), who married Richard Drake (d. 11 July 1603) of Esher, Surrey, equerry to Elizabeth I, third son of John Drake (died 1558), esquire, of Ash in the parish of Musbury, Devonshire, and brother of Bernard Drake, by whom she had a son, Francis Drake (d. 1633).
- William Stafford (1554–1612), conspirator, who about 1593 married Anne Gryme (died 1612), daughter of Thomas Gryme of Antingham, Norfolk, by whom he had a daughter, Dorothy Stafford, and a son, William Stafford (1593–1684).
- Sir John Stafford of Marlwood Park (January 1556 – 28 September 1624), Thornbury, Gloucestershire, who married firstly, Bridget Clopton (d. March 1574), the daughter of William Clopton of Kentwell Hall, by whom he had a son, and secondly, on 29 January 1580, Millicent Gresham (buried 24 December 1602), the daughter of Edmund Gresham (buried 31 August 1586) and Joan Hynde, by whom he had no issue.
- Dorothy Stafford, who likely died in infancy.

== Ancestry ==
Ancestors of William Stafford (courtier)

16. Sir Humphrey Stafford I, MP
8. Sir Humphrey Stafford II
17. Elizabeth Burdett
4. Sir Humphrey Stafford III
18. Sir Thomas Aylesbury, MP
9. Eleanor Aylesbury
19. Katherine Pavenham
2. Sir Humphrey Stafford IV
20. William Fray
10. Sir John Fray
21. Harriet Montgomery
5. Catherine Fray
22. Sir John Danvers
11. Agnes Danvers
23. Alice Verney
1. Sir William Stafford
24. Thomas Fogge
12. Sir William Fogge
25. Jane de Valence
6. Sir John Fogge
26. William Septuans
13. (Miss) Septuans
27. Elizabeth Cheyne
3. Margaret Fogge
28. Sir Nicholas Haute
14. William Haute, MP
29. Alice de Coven
7. Alice Haute
30. Richard Wydeville
15. Joan Wydeville
31. Joan Bedlisgate

== In popular culture ==
=== Films and television ===
- Stafford is portrayed by Eddie Redmayne in the Hollywood adaptation of The Other Boleyn Girl, by Philippa Gregory, alongside Scarlett Johansson as Mary Boleyn.
- Philip Glenister played Stafford alongside Natascha McElhone as Mary in the BBC film of The Other Boleyn Girl.
- Stafford is mentioned in the Showtime series The Tudors, in regards to his marriage to Mary Boleyn. However, he does not appear on-screen.
- Stafford appears briefly in the third episode of the first season of television adaptation of Wolf Hall. He is played by Tom Forbes.

=== Books ===
- Stafford appears as a principal character in The Last Boleyn, by Karen Harper, a book about the life of Mary Boleyn in the years before, during, and after her time as the mistress of Henry VIII . He was called "Staff" by all who knew him (in particular Henry VIII ).
- Stafford (called "William") also was a main character in The Other Boleyn Girl, by Philippa Gregory, who escorts Mary Boleyn to Hever Castle, first starting in 1527. They become friends soon after the death of Mary's first husband, William Carey and William (Stafford) buys Mary's children, Catherine Carey, Lady Knollys, and Henry Carey, 1st Baron Hunsdon, their first ponies. Mary and William marry in 1533, and in secret, and Anne Boleyn, Mary's sister, doesn't discover it until a year later, when Mary discovers that she is pregnant for the third time with her daughter, also called Anne.
- Stafford's marriage is mentioned in Wolf Hall, where Mary Boleyn is a prominent character. He appears briefly during a scene set in Calais.

== Bibliography ==
- Hart, Kelly. The Mistresses of Henry VIII. The History Press (1 July 2011); ISBN 978-0752458526
- Bindoff, The Commons 1509–1558
- Oxford DNB, Mary Boleyn
