= Dorothy Stafford =

English noblewoman (1526-1604)

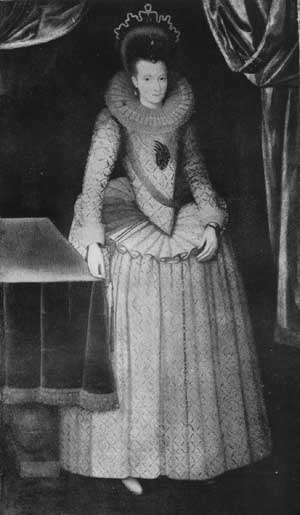
- Born: 1 October 1526; England
- Died: 22 September 1604 (aged 77)
- Buried: St. Margaret's Church, Westminster, London
- Noble family: Stafford
- Spouse: Sir William Stafford
- Issue: Sir Edward Stafford; William Stafford; Sir John Stafford; Elizabeth Stafford; Ursula Stafford; Dorothy Stafford
- Father: Henry Stafford, 1st Baron Stafford
- Mother: Ursula Pole
- Occupation: Mistress of the Robes to Queen Elizabeth I

Dorothy Stafford, Lady Stafford (1 October 1526 – 22 September 1604) was an English noblewoman, and an influential person at the court of Queen Elizabeth I of England, to whom she served as Mistress of the Robes. Dorothy Stafford was the second wife of Sir William Stafford, widower of Mary Boleyn. She and her family sought exile in Geneva during the reign of Mary I to escape the persecution of their Protestant religion. The Protestant reformer John Calvin stood as godfather to her youngest son.

== Family ==
Dorothy Stafford was born on 1 October 1526, the oldest daughter of Henry Stafford, 1st Baron Stafford and Lady Ursula Pole, whose mother, Margaret Pole, 8th Countess of Salisbury, would be executed for treason in 1541 by the order of King Henry VIII. Her grandmother was the last surviving member of the Plantagenet dynasty. Dorothy had thirteen siblings, of whom the names of twelve are known. With her sister Susan, she was raised in the household of her aunt, Elizabeth Stafford, Duchess of Norfolk. Dorothy was the Duchess's favourite niece, to whom she was very generous, giving her many gifts of clothing and money.

== Marriage and issue ==
About 1545 Dorothy Stafford married her distant cousin, Sir William Stafford, the second son of Sir Humphrey Stafford of Blatherwycke, Northamptonshire, by his first wife, Margaret Fogge, the daughter of Sir John Fogge of Ashford, Kent.

Sir William Stafford's first wife, Mary Boleyn, the elder sister of Anne Boleyn, had died in July 1543. Sir William was Mary Boleyn's second husband, her first having been William Carey, by whom she had a son, Henry Carey, 1st Baron Hunsdon, and a daughter, Catherine Carey. Sir William Stafford is said to have had at least two children by Mary, but both are said to have died young.

Sir William Stafford and Dorothy Stafford had three sons and three daughters:

- Sir Edward Stafford (1552–1604) of Grafton, who married firstly, Roberta Chapman (d. 1578), the daughter of Alexander Chapman of Rainthorpe Hall, Norfolk, by whom he had a son and two daughters, and secondly, on 29 November 1597, Douglas Sheffield (1547–1608), daughter of William Howard, 1st Baron Howard of Effingham, and sister of Charles Howard, 1st Earl of Nottingham.
- William Stafford (1554–1612), conspirator, who about 1593 married Anne Gryme (d. 1612), daughter of Thomas Gryme of Antingham, Norfolk, by whom he had a daughter, Dorothy Stafford, and a son, William Stafford (1593–1684).
- Sir John Stafford of Marlwood Park (January 1556 – 28 September 1624), Thornbury, Gloucestershire, who married firstly, Bridget Clopton (d. March 1574), the daughter of William Clopton of Kentwell Hall, by whom he had a son, and secondly, on 29 January 1580, Millicent Gresham (buried 24 December 1602), the daughter of Edmund Gresham (buried 31 August 1586) and Joan Hynde, by whom he had no issue.
- Elizabeth Stafford (d 6 February 1599), who married firstly, Sir William Drury (1550–1590), by whom she had issue. She married secondly Sir John Scott.
- Ursula Stafford (b. 1553), who married Richard Drake (d. 11 July 1603) of Esher, Surrey, equerry to Elizabeth I, third son of John Drake (d. 1558), esquire, of Ash in Musbury, Devonshire, and brother of Bernard Drake, by whom she had a son, Francis Drake (d. 1633).
- Dorothy Stafford, who likely died in infancy.

On 23 September 1545 Sir William Stafford was knighted in Scotland by Edward Seymour, Earl of Hertford during the War of the Rough Wooing.

Dorothy Stafford and her family were staunch Protestants, and during the reign of Mary I went into exile at Geneva, where they were befriended by the Protestant reformer, John Calvin, who stood as godfather to their youngest son, John, on 4 January 1556. On 5 May 1556, Sir William Stafford died, and Dorothy moved with her young children to Basel.

== Elizabeth I's court ==
In January 1559, following the accession of Queen Elizabeth I, Dorothy and her children returned to England, where she was received at court. Calvin had strongly opposed their departure, having wanted to keep his godson in Switzerland. In 1563 Dorothy was appointed Mistress of the Robes to Queen Elizabeth, and exercised much influence at the royal court. She used her influence with the Queen to promote the causes of both her friends and casual acquaintances; in 1569, Matthew Parker, Archbishop of Canterbury, seeking a prebend for a colleague, wrote to her requesting that she "speak some good word" on the matter to the Queen. In 1576 she broke her leg in a riding accident, but quickly recovered. Two years later she used her influence to secure the prestigious office of English Ambassador to France for her eldest son, Sir Edward Stafford.

She held her post at court until the Queen's death in 1603, having served her for 40 years. Her eldest daughter, Elizabeth Stafford, was a Lady of the Bedchamber, and her son-in-law, Richard Drake, served as the Queen's Equerry. Her late husband's two stepchildren by Mary Boleyn also held influential posts at court.

== Death ==
Dorothy died on 22 September 1604, and was buried in St. Margaret's Church, Westminster. Her effigy and monument are in the north aisle of the church. According to Adams, "six children are commemorated on her funeral monument, three boys and three girls". The inscription on the monument reads:

Here Lyeth the Lady Dorothy Stafford, Wife and Widow to Sir William Stafford, Knight, Daughter to Henry, Lord Stafford, the only son of Edward, the last Duke of Buckingham: Her mother was Ursula, Daughter to the Countesse of Salisbury, the only Daughter to George, Duke of Clarence, Brother to King Edward the Fourth. Shee continued a true Widow from the Age of 27 till her Death. She served Queen Elizabeth 40 Yeeres, lying in the Bedchamber, esteemed of her, loved of all, doing good, all she could, to every Body, never hurt any; a continual Remembrancer of the Suits of the Poor. As she Lived a religious Life, in great Reputation of Honour and Vertue in the World, so she ended in continual fervent Meditation, and hearty Prayer to God. At which Instant, as all her Life, so after her Death, she gave liberally to the Poore, and died aged 78, the 22. of September 1604. In whose Remembrance, Sir Edward Stafford, her sonne, hath caused this Memorial of her to be in the same Forme and Place as she herselfe long since required him.

== Notes ==
Court offices
Preceded by Susan Clarencieux	Mistress of the Robes to Queen Elizabeth I 1558–1603	Succeeded by Audrey Walsingham
