= Henry Stafford, 1st Baron Stafford =

English nobleman (1501–1563)

- Born: 18 September 1501; Penshurst Place, Kent, England
- Died: 30 April 1563 (aged 61); Caus Castle, Shropshire, England
- Buried: 6 May 1563; All Saints Church, Worthen, Shropshire, England
- Noble family: Stafford
- Spouse: Ursula Pole
- Issue: Thomas Stafford; Henry Stafford, 2nd Baron Stafford; Edward Stafford, 3rd Baron Stafford; Dorothy Stafford and more..
- Father: Edward Stafford, 3rd Duke of Buckingham
- Mother: Eleanor Percy, Duchess of Buckingham

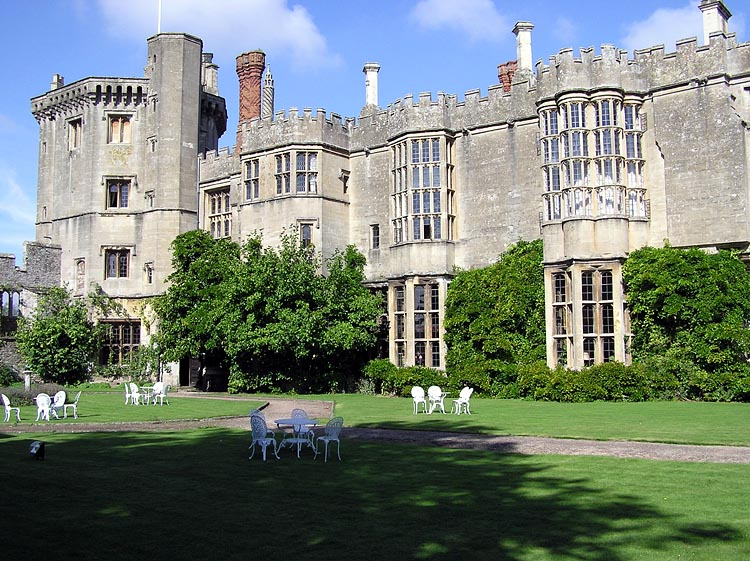
The west front of Thornbury Castle. The castle was begun in 1511 as a home for Henry Stafford's father, Edward Stafford, third Duke of Buckingham.

Henry Stafford, 1st Baron Stafford (18 September 1501 – 30 April 1563) was an English nobleman. After the execution for treason in 1521 and posthumous attainder of his father Edward Stafford, 3rd Duke of Buckingham, with the forfeiture of all the family's estates and titles, he managed to regain some of his family's position and was created Baron Stafford in 1547. However his family never truly recovered from the blow and thenceforward gradually declined into obscurity, with his descendant the 6th Baron being requested by King Charles I in 1639 to surrender the barony on account of his poverty.

== Origins ==
He was born on 18 September 1501 at Penshurst Place in Kent, the only son and heir of Edward Stafford, 3rd Duke of Buckingham (1477–1521), of Stafford Castle in Staffordshire and of Thornbury Castle in Gloucestershire, by his wife Eleanor Percy, a daughter of Henry Percy, 4th Earl of Northumberland and Maud Herbert.

== Marriage and issue ==
On 16 February 1519, aged 18, he married Ursula Pole, a daughter of Sir Richard Pole by his wife Margaret Plantagenet, suo jure 8th Countess of Salisbury. The marriage had been arranged by his father at the suggestion of Cardinal Thomas Wolsey. Ursula's dowry was 3,000 marks, which would be increased by 1,000 marks "if the Countess (of Salisbury) get back certain lands from the King". As part of the marriage settlement the Countess settled lands in Somerset and Devon worth 700 marks on the couple and their children and the Duke of Buckingham contributed lands worth £500 as Ursula's jointure. He also paid for the wedding expenses, apart from Ursula's wedding clothes which were provided by her mother. Following their marriage, Henry and Ursula lived in the household of his father, where they had guardians to watch over them. By Ursula he had about fourteen children, seven sons and seven daughters, of whom twelve names are known:

- Henry Stafford (b. November 1520), who died in early infancy. The Duke paid a midwife 10 shillings to attend Ursula following his birth.
- Henry Stafford, 2nd Baron Stafford (died 1566), eldest surviving son and heir, who married Elizabeth Davy;
- Thomas Stafford (c.1533 – 28 May 1557), executed for high treason.
- Edward Stafford, 3rd Baron Stafford (17 January 1535 – 18 October 1603), heir to his elder brother; he married Maria Stanley, a daughter of Edward Stanley, 3rd Earl of Derby, by whom he had issue.
- Richard Stafford, who married Mary Corbet, a daughter of John Corbet of Lee in Shropshire and Anne Booth, by whom he had issue Roger Stafford, 6th Baron Stafford, born about 1572, and Jane Stafford, born about 1581
- Walter Stafford (c. 1539 – after 1571)
- William Stafford
- Dorothy Stafford (1 October 1526 – 22 September 1604), who married Sir William Stafford, by whom she had six children. She was an influential person at the court of Queen Elizabeth I whom she served as Mistress of the Robes.
- Elizabeth Stafford, married Sir William Neville
- Anne Stafford, married Sir Henry Williams
- Susan Stafford (after 1547)
- Jane Stafford

== Titles and offices ==
He was styled by the courtesy title Earl of Stafford (his father's secondary peerage) until the attainder of his father in 1521. In 1547 he petitioned Parliament for restoration in blood, but did not claim any of his father's forfeited land or titles. In 1548 he was summoned to Parliament by writ, by King Edward VI, and was thus created 1st Baron Stafford.

The barony was initially regarded as a new creation, but in February 1558, he won the right to have it recognised as carrying precedence of the first creation of 1299, created for his ancestor Edmund de Stafford, 1st Baron Stafford (1272/3-1308), of Stafford Castle in Staffordshire, feudal baron of Stafford. In 1554, having petitioned Queen Mary I for financial assistance, he was made one of two Chamberlains of the Exchequer, a position that brought him an annual fee of £50.

This was the 4th creation of the title Baron Stafford which eventually was surrendered in 1639 by his descendant Roger Stafford, 6th Baron Stafford (called in his youth by the surname "Floyde"), due to his poverty and "very mean and obscure condition", at the request of King Charles I. Cleveland commented on him as follows: "This unfortunate man, the great-grandson of the last Duke, was then sixty-five, and had sunk into so abject a condition that he felt ashamed of bearing his own name, and long passed as Fludd, or Floyde, having, it is supposed, assumed the patronymic of one of his uncle's servants, who had reared and sheltered him in early life."

Having trained as a lawyer at Gray's Inn in 1528, in 1531 he was appointed to the honourable post of recorder of the borough of Stafford, next to his family's ancient seat of Stafford Castle. He was later appointed a justice of the Peace for both Staffordshire and Shropshire in 1536. Between 1558 and 1559 he was the lord-lieutenant of Staffordshire, a role which included being appointed as clerk of the Peace. He is sometimes identified as the Henry Stafford who sat for Stafford in the House of Commons in 1545 and 1547, but it is more likely that this was his illegitimate half-brother Henry Stafford.

== Literary interests ==
Stafford had an extensive library of about 300 books, mostly in Latin. In 1548 he published an English translation of the 1534 tract by Edward Foxe, as "The True Dyfferens Between the Royall Power and the Ecclesiasticall Power", (original Latin title De vera differentia regiae potestatis et ecclesiae). Under Queen Mary I, he converted back to Catholicism and translated two tracts by Erasmus against Luther, of which neither survives. He commissioned other translations, such as Humphrey Lloyd's version of Vassaeus on urine, and influenced the publication of Mirror for Magistrates in 1559.

== Death ==
He died on 30 April 1563, at the age of 61, at Caus Castle in Shropshire, the seat of the Corbet family. He was buried on 6 May in nearby Worthen Church. He was succeeded in his titles by his eldest surviving son Henry Stafford, 2nd Baron Stafford (died 1566), who himself died almost three years later.

Peerage of England
| New creation | Baron Stafford; 4th creation 1547–1563 | Succeeded by Henry Stafford |
