= Mary FitzRoy, Duchess of Richmond and Somerset =

English noblewoman

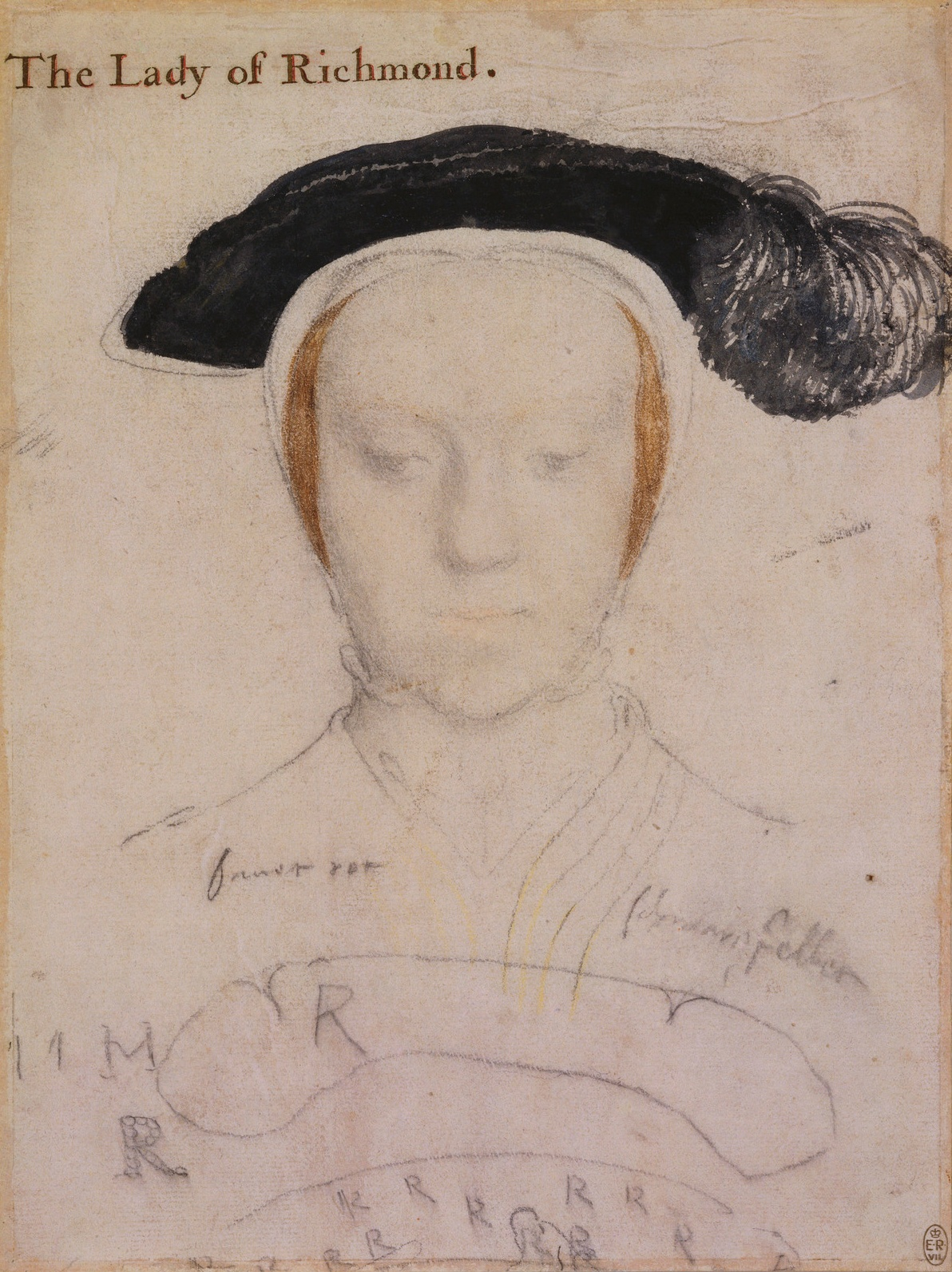
- Sketch by Hans Holbein the Younger
- Born: Mary Howard c. 1519
- Died: December 1555 or 1557(aged 37/38)
- Burial place: St. Michael the Archangel's Church in Framlingham, Suffolk, England.
- Known for: Daughter-in-law of King Henry VIII
- Spouse: Henry FitzRoy, 1st Duke of Richmond and Somerset
- Parents: Thomas Howard, 3rd Duke of Norfolk (father); Elizabeth Howard, Duchess of Norfolk (mother)

Mary FitzRoy, Duchess of Richmond and Somerset (c. 1519 – December 1555 or 1557), born Mary Howard, was a daughter-in-law of King Henry VIII of England, the wife of his illegitimate son Henry FitzRoy, 1st Duke of Richmond and Somerset.

== Childhood ==
Mary was born in 1519, the third of five children of Thomas Howard, then Earl of Surrey, and his wife Lady Elizabeth Stafford. Her paternal grandparents were Thomas Howard, 2nd Duke of Norfolk and Lady Elizabeth Tilney, and her maternal grandparents were Edward Stafford, 3rd Duke of Buckingham and Lady Eleanor Percy. Her older siblings were Henry born 1517 and Katherine born 1518, and her younger siblings were Thomas born 1520 and Muriel, born in 1521. At the time of her birth, her father was the third-highest-ranking and most powerful nobleman in England. Her grandfathers, Thomas Howard, 2nd Duke of Norfolk, and Edward Stafford, 3rd Duke of Buckingham, were the most powerful peers in the Kingdom. After Buckingham's execution for treason in 1521, her other grandfather was one of only two dukes in the kingdom (the other was Charles Brandon, 1st Duke of Suffolk). When her paternal grandfather died in May 1524, Mary's father became the new duke of Norfolk. This changed in 1525, when Henry VIII elevated Henry FitzRoy, his six-year-old illegitimate son by Elizabeth Blount, to the Dukedom of Richmond and Somerset. When in 1529 Cardinal Thomas Wolsey, who was charged with FitzRoy's care, fell from grace, the mantle passed to Thomas Howard. At the same time the idea arose, allegedly from either the King or Anne Boleyn, that FitzRoy should marry Norfolk's daughter.

== Marriage ==
In November 1533, negotiations were completed and Mary, now aged thirteen or fourteen, and FitzRoy, himself just fourteen, were married. Through her father, she was first cousin to both Anne Boleyn and Katherine Howard, as well as second cousin to Jane Seymour.

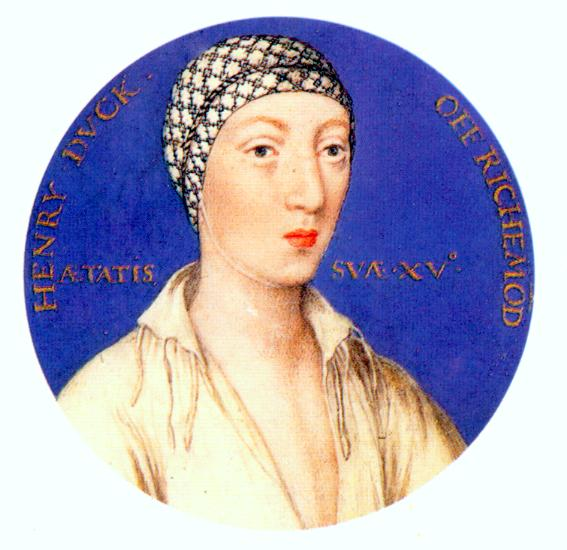
Henry FitzRoy, Duke of Richmond

The match was a triumph for the Boleyn family as the Duchess was a former member of Queen Anne's household, and a staunch advocate of reform. It was also a very advantageous match for the Duchess as, with no legitimate male heir to the throne, the Duke was seen at the time as a likely future king. However, the marriage was not to last as FitzRoy died of consumption on 23 July 1536. He had barely turned seventeen.

== Widowhood ==
Fearful that sexual activity too early was unhealthy, the King had ordered the couple not to consummate their marriage. As a result, the Duchess was not allowed to keep many of the lands which would normally have been her entitlement as widow. The King insisted without the consummation, it was not a true marriage. She remained at court, closely associated with FitzRoy's cousin, Margaret Douglas. Together they were the main contributors to the Devonshire Manuscript, a collection of poetry written by themselves and court poets. The Duchess is thought to be the owner or holder of the manuscript. It is not known how much she contributed, however she is thought to have copied in one of her brother's poems "O Happy Dames." In 1539, Douglas and the Duchess were appointed to meet Anne of Cleves at Calais.

In 1542, when Henry VIII's fifth wife and the Duchess's first cousin Katherine Howard fell from grace, the Duchess and her entire family were arrested and briefly imprisoned in the Tower of London. The Duchess's father petitioned for her to be married to Thomas Seymour, brother of Henry VIII's third wife Jane Seymour. The King gave his approval for the match, but her brother, Henry, Earl of Surrey, objected strongly, as did the Duchess herself, and the marriage did not take place. Surrey then suggested that the Duchess should seduce the aged King, her father-in-law, and become his mistress, to "wield as much influence on him as Madame d'Etampes doth about the French King". The Duchess, outraged, said she would "cut her own throat" rather than "consent to such villainy".

Mary and her brother fell out, and she later testified at the trial for treason in which both Surrey and her father were sentenced to death. Surrey was executed on 19 January 1547, while his father was spared the same fate because Henry VIII had died in the early hours of the Duke's scheduled execution date (January 28), although he remained a prisoner in the Tower of London throughout the reign of Edward VI. Although her father was the premier Roman Catholic nobleman of England, and Mary herself was raised in the traditional faith as a child, she was sympathetic to reformist ideas, and engaged the Protestant martyrologist John Foxe as tutor for her brother's five children: Thomas, Jane, Henry, Katherine and Margaret. A list of her possessions at this time mentions a Flemish coffer containing paper patterns for embroidery.

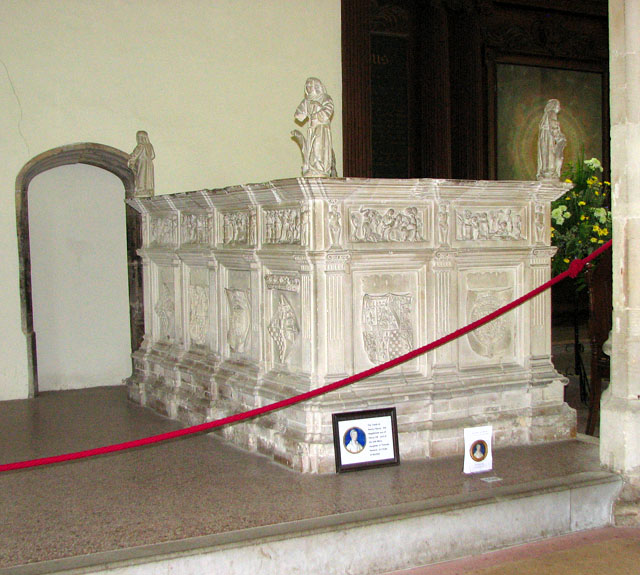
Tomb of Henry FitzRoy, Duke of Richmond and Mary Howard. St Michael the Archangel's Church, Framlingham, Suffolk

The Duchess never remarried and her presence at court dwindled after Henry VIII died in January 1547. Beverly Murphy assigns the date of her death to December 1555, during the reign of her sister-in-law, Queen Mary I, but Heather Darsie contends that her death was on 7 December 1557, from influenza.

== Fictional portrayals ==
Mary FitzRoy has appeared in many books of noted historical fiction, most notably The Secrets of the Tudor Court by Darcey Bonnette which features Mary as the main character, and The Sixth Wife, in which she is a rival of Katherine Parr, and is used by her brother Surrey to try to become a "seventh wife" of the King despite her protests. Her character mainly falls into the background toward the end of the novel after the king has died. She is also featured in Queen's Gambit, a novel about Katherine Parr and is featured as one of Katherine's rivals. Mary was also the main character and story-teller in Brazen by Katherine Longshore.

Mary is portrayed by Viola Prettejohn in Season 2 of the televised version of Dame Hilary Mantel's Wolf Hall trilogy, Wolf Hall: The Mirror and the Light, in late 2024 (UK; airing 2025 in the US). Otherwise her portrayal in film or television is limited to being mentioned in the second episode of the 2021 miniseries Anne Boleyn in a scene between Anne and her uncle Thomas Howard where they discuss his daughter's marriage to Henry FitzRoy that has not yet been consummated.
