= Henry Stafford (MP) =

Henry Stafford (fl. 1541–1555) was an English politician, the illegitimate son of Edward Stafford, 3rd Duke of Buckingham. He served as the Member of Parliament representing Stafford in 1545, 1547, October 1553 and 1555, but his later career is obscure.

Stafford's mother is unknown but he is assumed to have been born by 1520; the date is not recorded but can be inferred from his having reached majority by November 1541.

His father, the Duke of Buckingham, was charged with treason and executed by Henry VIII in May 1521, followed by a comprehensive act of attainder in 1523 to abolish his titles. Buckingham's heir (and only legitimate son) Henry, however, over the following years slowly recovered a portion of his estates, taking possession of Stafford Castle and becoming recorder of the town in 1531, then a Justice of the Peace in 1536, while stressing his loyalty to the King. In 1541, Henry Stafford was appointed as the steward of his half-brother's holding of Holderness in Yorkshire.

He is believed to have led a troop of horsemen from Bridlington to fight in Scotland in 1544, as part of the war known as the "Rough Wooing", and may also have been the Henry Stafford who was captured and ransomed for £700 by the Scots in 1549.

He was selected to represent Stafford in the Parliaments of 1545, 1547, October 1553 and 1555; little is known of his activity there, though in 1553 he was recorded as supporting the Protestant faction.

There is no definite record of his activities after leaving Parliament in 1555, though it is possible he is the Henry Stafford who was appointed constable of Dungarvan Castle in 1559.
