= Elizabeth Holland =

16th-century English political figure

Elizabeth Holland (died 1547/8), commonly known as Bess Holland, was an English courtier. She was the mistress of Thomas Howard, 3rd Duke of Norfolk and maid-of-honour to his niece, Anne Boleyn, the second wife of Henry VIII of England.

== Life ==
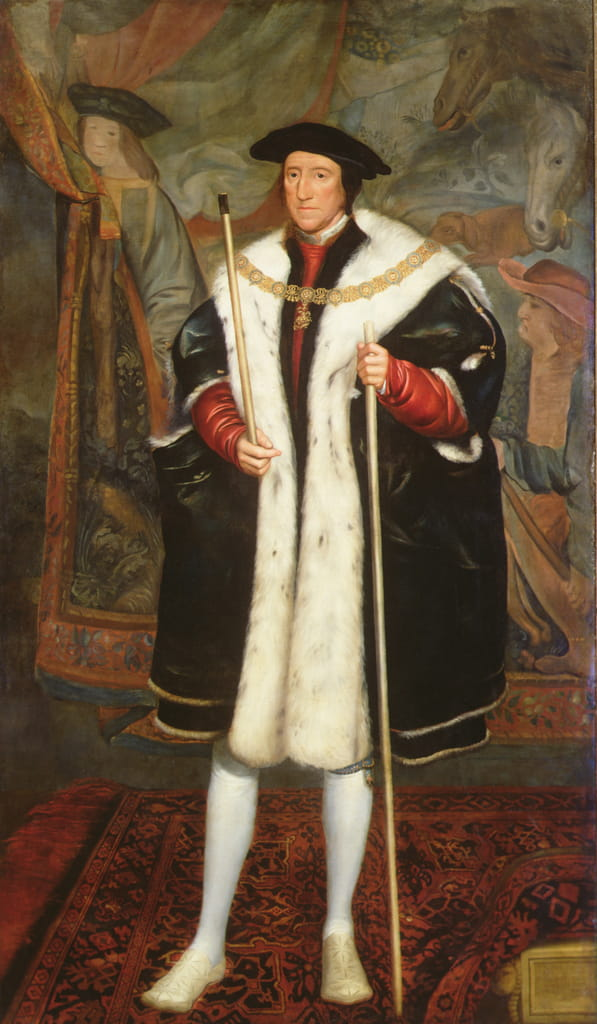
Thomas Howard, 3rd Duke of Norfolk After Hans Holbein the Younger. An embellished portrait possibly by or after Henry Stone

The daughter or sister of the Duke's secretary, it is often said that Holland had worked for eight years as a laundress in the household of Norfolk's wife, Elizabeth Stafford, Duchess of Norfolk. This is from one of the Duchess of Norfolk's letters in which she describes Holland as a "churl’s daughter who was but a washer in my nursery for eight years". Kate Emerson points out that since Holland was a gentlewoman, she was probably not a laundress in the household, or the children's nurse, but may have been the children's governess. Holland was certainly on good terms with Lady Mary Howard, Norfolk's daughter.

When Anne Boleyn was created Marquess of Pembroke, Holland was one of her maids of honour.

Holland was still at court in 1537, when she rode in the funeral cortege of Queen Jane.

== Family ==
The Visitations of Norfolk and The Gawdy Papers identify Holland as "Elizabeth Holland da. to Thomas Holland of Swynested"; Kate Emerson, in A Who's Who of Tudor Women, claims Elizabeth Holland was the daughter (some sources say the sister) of John Holland of Wortwell Hall in Redenhall, Norfolk and a kinswoman, probably a niece, of John Hussey, 1st Baron Hussey of Sleaford.

Holland's brother, George, signed for her jewellery “for and in the name of my said sister” when it was returned to her in February 1547. After the Duke of Norfolk's fall the commissioners had seized rings, brooches, strings of pearls, silver spoons, ivory tables, and other treasures from her lodgings at Kenninghall, where she had at her disposal an outer chamber, a bedchamber, and an adjoining garret. Her eldest brother, Thomas, was involved in a dispute with her husband over her inheritance after her death.

== Fall of Norfolk ==
Despite a relationship of fifteen years duration with the Duke, when he and his son, Henry Howard, Earl of Surrey, were arrested in December 1546, Holland gave information which helped to seal their fates. Emerson points out that she probably had no choice. Surrey was executed on the evening before the king died. Norfolk's execution was not carried out after the king's death; instead, he was kept in the Tower of London throughout the reign of King Edward VI, and was released in 1553, at the start of the reign of Queen Mary I, whose Catholic beliefs were similar to his.

In April, 1547 or earlier, Edmond of Sybeton, Suffolk, sent Holland, a receipt for 100 pounds "from Mrs. Holland by hands of Mr. Henry to be paid unto my Lord of Norfolk his Grace". It appears that Holland sent money to the Duke of Norfolk whilst he was incarcerated in the Tower.

In 1547 Holland married Henry Reppes (d. 1558) of South Reppes, Norfolk, She was given a pardon on July 1547, but by November she had died in childbirth. Her nephew, Thomas Holland, was made her heir.

== Holland's jewels and costume ==
An inventory of jewels belonging to Elizabeth Holland survives. It includes a diamond ring, which had been a gift from Mary Shelton and a sapphire ring given to her by Mistress Freeston. She had a brooch with a picture of Cupid, one with the Trinity, and another of Our Lady of Pity with Christ in her lap. She owned a gold pin case, and three gold button clasps for partlets each set with two "counterfeit" stones. A girdle of gold chain links had a "tablet" or locket of gold with the Virgin Mary holding the "vernacle" or veil with the image of Jesus, and a jacinth stone on its other side. She owned four pairs of billiments, upper and nether, of goldsmith's work for her French hoods, and a velvet-covered prayer book with gold mounts.

An inventory of her clothes includes French-style gowns of black velvet, satin, and damask, some with "placards" (stomachers) of the same fabric. She had two farthingales made of red Bruges satin. Her partlets were made of lawn or of black velvet. She owned a velvet side-saddle, and practised embroidery and had a cushion cover on a frame, another was worked with her own initials "E.H".
