= Ursula Pole, Baroness Stafford =

English noblewoman

Lady Ursula Pole
- Baroness Stafford
- Born: c. 1504; England
- Died: 12 August 1570 (aged 65–66)
- Noble family: Pole (birth); Plantagenet (motherhood); Stafford (marriage)
- Spouse: Henry Stafford, 1st Baron Stafford
- Issue: Henry Stafford; Dorothy Stafford, Lady Stafford; Henry Stafford, 2nd Baron Stafford; Thomas Stafford; Edward Stafford, 3rd Baron Stafford; Richard Stafford; Walter Stafford; William Stafford; Elizabeth Stafford; Anne Stafford; Susan Stafford; Jane Stafford; Others two daughters
- Father: Sir Richard Pole
- Mother: Margaret Pole, 8th Countess of Salisbury

Ursula Pole, Baroness Stafford (c.1504 – 12 August 1570) was an English noblewoman; the wife of Henry Stafford, 1st Baron Stafford; a wealthy heiress and the only daughter of Margaret Pole, 8th Countess of Salisbury. Her mother was the last surviving member of the Plantagenet dynasty and was executed for treason at the age of 67 in 1541 by the command of King Henry VIII.

== Family ==
Lady Ursula was born in about 1504, the only daughter of Sir Richard Pole and Margaret Pole, suo jure 8th Countess of Salisbury, who, as the daughter of George Plantagenet, Duke of Clarence and Isabella Neville, was the last surviving member of the Plantagenet dynasty.

Ursula's father died in 1505 when she was a baby. The Poles' chief residence was Warblington Castle in Hampshire. Ursula's mother would stand as godmother to the Princess Mary, and later hold the post of Royal Governess.

Ursula had four older brothers, Henry Pole, 1st Baron Montagu, Reginald Pole, Cardinal and last Roman Catholic Archbishop of Canterbury, Sir Geoffrey Pole, and Sir Arthur Pole. Her eldest brother Henry, who was one of the peers at the trial of Queen Anne Boleyn, was executed for treason in 1539; two years later her mother followed him to the block, and her titles and honours were forfeited to the Crown. Geoffrey was suspected of treason and went into exile on the Continent.

== Marriage and issue ==
On 16 February 1518/1519, Lady Ursula married Henry Stafford, 1st Baron Stafford (18 September 1501 – 30 April 1563), the only son of Edward Stafford, 3rd Duke of Buckingham and Lady Alianore Percy. She was about 15 years old, and he was not yet 18. His eldest sister, Elizabeth Stafford was married to Thomas Howard, 3rd Duke of Norfolk. The marriage had been arranged by the Duke of Buckingham, at the suggestion of Cardinal Thomas Wolsey. Ursula's dowry was 3,000 marks, which would be increased by 1,000 marks "if the Countess (of Salisbury) get back certain lands from the King". The Countess settled lands in Somerset and Devon worth 700 marks on the couple and their children. In return, the Duke of Buckingham was required to set aside lands worth £500 as Ursula's jointure. He also paid for the wedding expenses, apart from Ursula's wedding clothes which were provided by her mother.

Following their marriage, Ursula and Henry made their home in the household of her father-in-law, the Duke of Buckingham, where they had guardians to watch over them. In November 1520, Ursula gave birth to her first child; she would have a total of seven sons and seven daughters. The Duke paid a midwife 10 shillings to attend Ursula following the birth of the child.

Five months earlier, Ursula had been in France at the Field of the Cloth of Gold despite being in her fourth month of pregnancy. The following year, 1521, her father-in-law was beheaded for treason and posthumously attainted by an Act of Parliament, with his title and estates being forfeited to the Crown. Ursula's husband was created 1st Baron Stafford by King Henry's son and successor, Edward VI, in 1547. From that time onward, Ursula was styled Baroness Stafford.

Henry and Ursula had a total of about fourteen children of whom twelve names are known:

- Henry Stafford (born November 1520 – died in early infancy)
- Dorothy Stafford (1 October 1526 – 22 September 1604), married Sir William Stafford, by whom she had six children. Dorothy was an influential person at the court of Queen Elizabeth I to whom she served in the capacity of Mistress of the Robes.
- Henry Stafford, 2nd Baron Stafford (died 1565), married Elizabeth Davy.
- Thomas Stafford (c.1533 – 28 May 1557), executed for High Treason.
- Edward Stafford, 3rd Baron Stafford (17 January 1535 – 18 October 1603), married Maria Stanley, daughter of Edward Stanley, 3rd Earl of Derby, by whom he had issue.
- Richard Stafford, married Mary Corbet, by whom he had issue, including Roger Stafford, 6th Baron Stafford.
- Walter Stafford (c.1539 – after 1571).
- William Stafford.
- Elizabeth Stafford, married Sir William Neville.
- Anne Stafford, married Sir Henry Williams.
- Susan Stafford.
- Jane Stafford.
- Other two daughters whose name are unknown.

Ursula appeared to have had a cordial relationship with her sister-in-law Elizabeth Stafford, Duchess of Norfolk, with whom Ursula's husband had quarrelled. Upon her death in 1558, the Duchess bequeathed to Ursula, whom she affectionately described as her "sister Stafford", all her apparel and jewellery, as well as a French hood and a velvet-covered saddle.

== Death ==
Ursula died on 12 August 1570 at the age of about 66. At the time of her death, her oldest daughter, Dorothy was one of the most influential ladies at the court of Queen Elizabeth I, serving as Mistress of the Robes.

Ursula's husband had died in 1563, and was succeeded by their eldest surviving son, Henry as 2nd Baron Stafford, who himself died two years later.
