= Henry Stafford, 2nd Baron Stafford =

English peer and MP

Henry Stafford
- Baron Stafford
- Born: Isleworth, Middlesex, England
- Died: 8 April 1566; Stafford Castle
- Noble family: Stafford
- Spouse: Elizabeth Davy
- Father: Henry Stafford, 1st Baron Stafford
- Mother: Ursula Pole

Henry Stafford, 2nd Baron Stafford (before 1527 – 8 April 1566) was an English peer in the peerage of England and MP.

== Family life ==
Henry Stafford was the eldest surviving son of Henry Stafford, 1st Baron Stafford and Ursula Pole. He married Elizabeth Davy, daughter of John Davy of Holbeach, Lincolnshire, before 1557.

== Serving in Parliament ==
Henry Stafford failed twice in 1553 to be returned as knight of the shire for Staffordshire for Parliament. According to his father, he should have been returned as he was 'chosen by the whole shire, no man saying the contrary'. He was eventually elected in 1555, this time as a representative for Shropshire. He did not appear to be active in the Commons, leaving little record of his actions; The History of Parliament notes that he was not on any list of those who opposed Government bills.

== Honours and titles ==
Henry Stafford was knighted at Queen Mary I's coronation, 2 Oct 1553. He was appointed Justice of the Peace for Shropshire in 1554. He was appointed keeper of the records at the Tower of London early in Queen Elizabeth I's reign, a post he held until about January 1564. He complained to William Cecil at this point that he had been deprived of his office by William Bowyer.

Henry Stafford succeeded as the 2nd Baron Stafford at his father's death on 30 April 1563. He only held the barony for 3 years, being succeeded by his brother Edward Stafford on 8 April 1566.

== Notes ==
Peerage of England
Preceded by Henry Stafford	Baron Stafford; 1563–1566	Succeeded by Edward Stafford
