= Edward Stafford (diplomat) =

English Member of Parliament, courtier and diplomat (1552-1605)

- Born: 1552
- Died: 5 February 1605 (aged 52–53)
- Resting place: St. Margaret's Church, Westminster Abbey, London, United Kingdom
- Education: -St John's College, Cambridge -Pembroke College, Cambridge
- Occupation: Diplomat
- Years active: 1571–1605 (his death)
- Spouse(s): -Roberta Chapman (early 1570s–1578, her death) -Douglas Sheffield (née Howard) (1579–1605, his death)
- Children: 3 (first marriage); 2 (second marriage)
- Parent(s): Sir William Stafford, Dorothy Stafford
- Awards: Knighted 1583

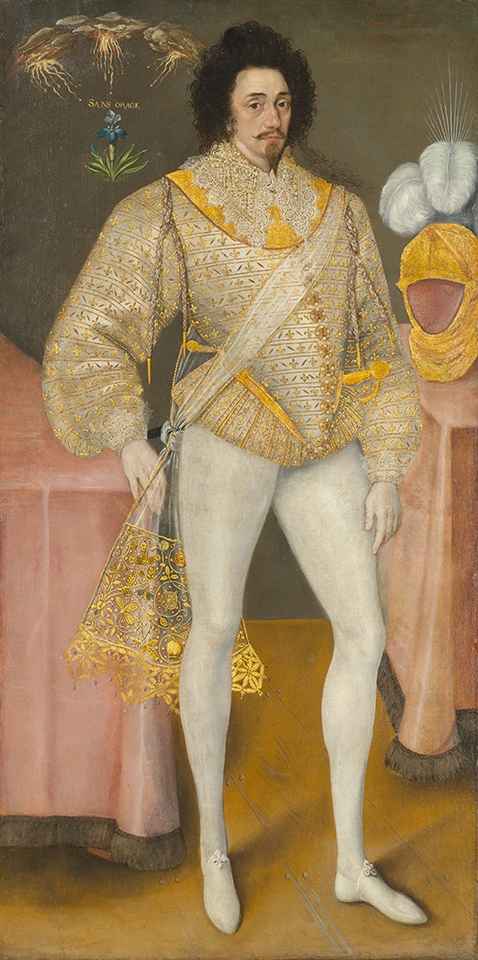
Portrait of a Man, possibly Sir Edward Stafford (1552–1605)

Sir Edward Stafford (1552 – 5 February 1605) was an English Member of Parliament, courtier, and diplomat to France during the time of Queen Elizabeth I.

He was involved in abortive negotiations for a proposed marriage between Elizabeth and Francis, Duke of Anjou.

After he was appointed ambassador to Paris in 1583, he took money from Henry I, Duke of Guise in return for access to diplomatic correspondence. He also received money from a Spanish agent, Bernardino de Mendoza, and there is strong evidence that has convinced most historians that Stafford in return for the money passed on secrets to Spain. Further, it was his duty to report to London intelligence he possessed on the formation of the Spanish Armada, but he did not do so. The English counterspy Francis Walsingham was deeply suspicious but was unable to prove anything and could not act as long as Stafford was protected by Lord Burghley. No action was taken against him by Elizabeth, although he was not given any posts of consequence after his recall in 1590. McDermott concludes, "The evidence of Stafford's treachery, though substantial, remains circumstantial, and the precise degree of his culpability is difficult to establish". Leimon and Parker are convinced of his guilt and add, " Equally damning is the misinformation about the nonexistence and false destinations of the Armada Stafford forwarded to England".

== Early life ==
Stafford was born to Sir William Stafford of Chebsey, Staffordshire and Dorothy Stafford, his second wife.

After studying at St John's College, Cambridge and Pembroke College, Cambridge, Stafford was assisted by William Cecil, Lord Burghley and became a member of parliament for Mitchell in Cornwall (1571) and then for Heytesbury in Wiltshire (1572). He was a member of Elizabeth I's court from 1573, carrying Burghley's secret letters. His mother was Mistress of the Robes to Elizabeth I from 1564 which assisted Stafford's position.

== Diplomacy in France ==
In 1578, Stafford was sent to France to act in negotiations on behalf of Queen Elizabeth I with King Henry III of France, concerning the possibility of Elizabeth's engagement to Francis, Duke of Anjou; the duke stayed with Stafford on a visit to England in August 1579. Stafford was sent on three further missions to France in 1580 concerning the proposed marriage.

He was knighted in 1583 and was appointed ambassador to Paris. In March 1585, Stafford obtained a cipher key, thought to be used in the correspondence of the Duke of Guise, the Archbishop of Glasgow, and Mary, Queen of Scots, which he forwarded to Francis Walsingham. Stafford came to align himself with Burghley, rather than with Walsingham, which caused complications of loyalties in Walsingham's intelligence network, and Stafford's own letters were intercepted by Walsingham's agents.

Stafford's gambling and financial difficulties were reported upon by Walsingham, which led to Stafford ignoring Walsingham when sending information from Paris. He took 3,000 crowns from Henry I, Duke of Guise, in return for access to diplomatic correspondence, and became linked with Charles Arundell, a leader of the English Roman Catholics living in Paris. These developments became known to Walsingham, although he did not seek to move against Stafford, who still had Burghley's protection; the death of Walsingham's heir in October 1586 led to a reconciliation between Walsingham and Burghley in any case, and Stafford and Walsingham exchanged friendly letters in April 1587.

Stafford has been described as a Francophile. He lacked sympathy for the plight of Huguenots in France.

== Relationship with Spain ==
However, before this reconciliation, in January 1587, Arundel had acted as an intermediary between Stafford and the Spanish agent Bernardino de Mendoza in discussions about Stafford acting as a spy; Arundel was given 2,000 crowns to hand to Stafford. Whilst one suggested motive is money, another possibility is a desire for revenge upon Walsingham. Although it is unclear whether Mendoza had three informers in Paris, or just one (Stafford) to whom Mendoza gave three pseudonyms, Mendoza was given warning of Francis Drake's attack on the Spanish fleet at Cádiz, amongst other secrets. According to historian David Howarth, Stafford's code name in Mendoza's letters was "Lucio." He once accepted ten thousand golden ducats.

However, some information passed on to Spain was inaccurate, either because Stafford was deliberately not giving Spain the full picture, or because Stafford himself was kept ill-informed. Stafford was less than forthcoming in his reports to London when giving details of preparations for the Spanish Armada in 1588, either deliberately or because of over-reliance on Mendoza. There is only circumstantial evidence that Stafford acted traitorously, although the weight of evidence against him has been described as "substantial".

== After the Armada ==
After the defeat of the Armada, Stafford eventually stopped giving intelligence to Mendoza – either because he no longer had a financial incentive so to do (as Elizabeth had cancelled his debts) or because Walsingham's death in 1590 removed a personal motive.

He was recalled from Paris in 1590, and held no major posts thereafter, although he was given the sinecure of Clerk of the Pipe from 1596 to his death. He was returned to the House of Commons of England for various constituencies, namely (Winchester in 1593; Stafford in 1597 and 1601; Queenborough in 1604).

He died on 5 February 1605, and was buried at St. Margaret's, Westminster.

== Personal life ==
Stafford married Roberta Chapman during the early 1570s; they had one son (who outlived Stafford) and two daughters; Roberta died during her fourth pregnancy in 1578.

Stafford then married Douglas Sheffield, sister of Charles Howard, 2nd Baron Howard of Effingham and former lover of Robert Dudley, 1st Earl of Leicester. The marriage strengthened his links with the queen, since his sister-in-law Katherine was Elizabeth's closest female companion, as well as being her second cousin. Stafford had two children with his second wife, who did not survive childhood.
