= William Stafford (conspirator) =

English courtesan and conspirator (1554–1612)

- Born: 1 March 1554; Rochford, Essex, England
- Died: 16 November 1612 (aged 58)
- Noble family: Stafford
- Spouse: Anne Gryme
- Issue: Dorothy Stafford, William Stafford
- Father: Sir William Stafford
- Mother: Dorothy Stafford

William Stafford (1 March 1554 – 16 November 1612) was an English courtier and conspirator.

He was the son of William Stafford of Chebsey, who had been the brother-in-law of Henry VIII of England and the uncle of Elizabeth I. The elder William Stafford's first marriage had been to Mary Boleyn, sister of Anne Boleyn, and Stafford was the child of his second marriage to Dorothy Stafford.

== Early life ==
In 1555, William's strongly Protestant family went into exile in Geneva, Switzerland. They were there for nearly two years and were associates with John Calvin who was godfather to William's brother. Following the death of his father, the remaining family moved to Basel, where they lived next door to John Knox. They returned to Waltham, Essex in 1559.

William was educated at Winchester College, where he was admitted in 1564, and New College, Oxford, where he matriculated in 1571. In 1573 he was elected a fellow of New College, but two years later he was deprived of his fellowship for being away without leave. He came to London, where his mother was in attendance on Queen Elizabeth.

== Travel and Espionage ==
In 1585, William went to France secretly, staying in the lodgings of his brother Sir Edward Stafford, ambassador to France, and spying on his own account. When this was found out, he begged Sir Francis Walsingham's intercession with his mother. He soon returned to England.

The following year, William became involved with the plans of Châteauneuf, the French ambassador. By 1587, Châteauneuf was conspiring to poison Queen Elizabeth, using William Stafford's court connections to plant a poisoned gown or saddle for the queen's use. William confessed the plot to Walsingham, who arrested the conspirators. William was released from the Tower in August 1588 without any charges being brought. It is speculated that William was an agent provocateur for Walsingham in this plot; certainly he suffered no lasting harm from the episode.

After this, William retired to a quiet life in the country. In 1593 he married Anne Gryme, daughter of Thomas Gryme of Antingham, Norfolk, and soon became a father. His son was another William Stafford, a notable author. He died on 16 November 1612.
