= The Sixth Wife =

1953 novel by Eleanor Hibbert

- First edition (publ. Robert Hale)
- Author: Jean Plaidy
- Language: English
- Publisher: Robert Hale
- Publication date: 1953
- OCLC: 1669792
- LC Class: PZ3.H5212 Si

The Sixth Wife is a 1953 historical novel by noted novelist Jean Plaidy. It recounts the tale of Catherine Parr, the sixth wife of Henry VIII, King of England. The novel covers the life of Catherine as Queen, and her fearful feeling of being replaced in the King's eyes.

Though the novel conveys Catherine's life, several other characters' lives are foreshadowed as well. Catherine's family play a key role including her sister Anne Parr Herbert, her stepdaughter Elizabeth, niece Jane Grey, doomed friend Anne Askew, rivals Thomas Wriothesley, 1st Earl of Southampton, Stephen Gardiner, Henry Howard, Anne Stanhope, Mary Howard Fitzroy the Dowager Duchess of Richmond and former romantic interest Thomas Seymour.

The novel unfolds over a period of five years, recounting Catherine's rise as Queen Consort to her death as Dowager Queen.

== Historical inaccuracies ==
Though the novel is a work of fiction, it contains minor historical inaccuracies regarding the Six Wives of Henry VIII. It states that Anne Boleyn suffered four miscarriages during her marriage to the King yet there were three that were historically confirmed. Also Henry, while reflecting upon his wives, recalls that he married Jane Seymour quickly because she was pregnant and she lost the child shortly after the wedding, something which is entirely fictional. Catherine Howard is also recalled to have lost a child. There is only small historical evidence to suggest that Catherine may have become pregnant during her short term as Queen, but she may have suffered a false pregnancy before beginning her menstrual cycle and not having a miscarriage as stated in the novel. Today, the pregnancies of the wives are still debated, with Boleyn and Howard possibly having miscarriages, and Seymour maybe having one during her early marriage, and not before as fictitiously stated.
