= The Blanket of the Dark =

1931 novel by John Buchan

- Author: John Buchan
- Language: English
- Genre: Novel
- Set in: England
- Publisher: Hodder & Stoughton
- Publication date: 1931
- Media type: Print
- Pages: 314

The Blanket of the Dark is a 1931 historical novel by the Scottish author John Buchan. The novel is set in the early part of the reign of Henry VIII, and explores the possible consequences had the Tudors been overthrown by a rightful descendant of Edward III.

== Plot ==
The action of the novel takes place in the country west of Oxford during the 1536 Pilgrimage of Grace, an uprising against Henry VIII. Peter Pentecost, a young monastic scholar, is informed by shadowy figures who are plotting to depose the king that he is the legitimate son of the deceased Duke of Buckingham and that, as the last of the Bohun line, he has a claim to the English throne.

Although his true identity must for now remain secret, Peter finds himself being prepared for his intended kingly role and being tutored in the noble pursuits of swordsmanship and archery. He meets a noblewoman, Sabine Beauforest.

To hide from the king’s men, Peter takes to the greenwood where he is aided by Solomon Darking and his vagabond comrades. They introduce him to the lore of the countryside, and reveal the existence of a self-contained outlaw society, invisible to the agents of the state, with its own system of communication and intelligence gathering. He discovers that "under the blanket of the dark all men are alike and all are nameless".

As the novel progresses, Peter has increasing doubts about the venture he is being asked to undertake, and the motives of those behind it: "They claimed to stand for the elder England and its rights, and the old Church, but at their heart they stood only for themselves." After an encounter with the king himself, Peter asks himself whether there "might not there be a world of light under the blanket of the dark?" He accepts that he is not destined for a life of power and disappears from official sight back into the greenwood.

== Title ==
The title is a phrase from William Shakespeare's Macbeth, where Lady Macbeth, preparing herself to murder King Duncan, says "Come, thick night, / And pall thee in the dunnest smoke of hell, / That my keen knife see not the wound it makes, / Nor heaven peep through the blanket of the dark, / To cry, Hold, hold!" (Macbeth, Act 1, Scene 5)

== Critical reception ==
David Daniell in The Interpreter's House (1975) quotes Kipling who professed to be "rested and delighted" by the book and who called it a tour de force. Rose Macaulay said that the book was "so enchanting and beautiful that I often read it for my pleasure". Daniell himself notes that while the tone is relaxed, the control is tight, and "it is as if Buchan is drawing together all his skills under the influence of his response to the land and its people".

Writing for the John Buchan Society website in 2001, Kenneth Hillier called The Blanket of the Dark “a thoroughly enjoyable book, because it not only expresses the deep love Buchan had for his adopted countryside but it conveys great empathy with the period in which it is set”.

David Goldie noted in 2009 that "One of the animating ideas of The Blanket of the Dark is that English values are expressed more profoundly in the quiet wisdom of its folk than in the forceful actions of its rulers".

In 2019, the historian Diarmaid MacCulloch called it a "wonderful young adult book", also describing it as "chilling" and "brilliant".
