= Thomas Stafford (rebel) =

English aristocrat who was executed for treason

- Born: c. 1533; England
- Died: 28 May 1557 (aged 23–24); Tower Hill, London
- Noble family: Stafford
- Father: Henry Stafford, 1st Baron Stafford
- Mother: Ursula Pole
- Cause of death: decapitation

The Hon. Thomas Stafford (c. 1533 – 28 May 1557) was an English aristocrat who was executed for treason after being involved in two rebellions against Queen Mary I.

== Early life ==
Thomas Stafford was the ninth child and second surviving son of Henry Stafford, 1st Baron Stafford and Ursula Pole. Little is known of his early life, first being mentioned in 1550 as he travelled to Rome, where he associated with his uncle Reginald Cardinal Pole. He spent three years in Italy before travelling to Poland, obtaining the recommendation of King Sigismund Augustus who requested Mary restore him to the Dukedom of Buckingham.

== Rebellion ==
Augustus's appeal appeared to have no effect. When Stafford returned to England in January 1554 he joined the rebellion led by Thomas Wyatt; this arose out of concern of Mary's determination to marry Philip II of Spain. The rebellion failed and Thomas was captured and briefly imprisoned in the Fleet Prison before fleeing to France. There, he intrigued with other English exiles and continued to promote his claim to the English throne.

On 18 April 1557 (Easter Sunday) Stafford sailed from Dieppe with two ships and over 30 men. Landing in Scarborough on 25 April 1557, he walked into the unprotected castle and proclaimed himself Protector of the Realm, attempting to incite a new revolt by denouncing the Spanish marriage, railed against increased Spanish influence and promised to return the crown "to the trewe Inglyshe bloude of our owne naterall countrye". Stafford claimed he had seen letters at Dieppe showing that Scarborough and 12 other castles would be given to Philip II and garrisoned with 12,000 Spanish soldiers before his coronation. Three days later, the Earl of Westmorland recaptured the castle and arrested Stafford and his companions.

== Death ==
Stafford was beheaded for treason on 28 May 1557 on Tower Hill, after imprisonment in the Tower of London. Thirty-two of his followers were also executed after the rebellion.
