= Elizabeth Howard, Duchess of Norfolk =

English aristocrat and noblewoman (c. 1497–1558)

Her Grace The Duchess of Norfolk
- Born: Lady Elizabeth Stafford c. 1497
- Died: 30 November 1558 (aged 60-61); Lambeth, Surrey, England
- Buried: Church of St Mary-at-Lambeth, Surrey
- Noble family: Stafford (by birth); Howard (by marriage)
- Spouse: Thomas Howard, 3rd Duke of Norfolk
- Issue: Henry Howard, Earl of Surrey; Lady Katherine Howard, Countess of Derby; Lady Mary Howard, Duchess of Richmond and Somerset; Thomas Howard, 1st Viscount Howard of Bindon; Lady Muriel Howard
- Father: Edward Stafford, 3rd Duke of Buckingham
- Mother: Lady Eleanor Percy

Elizabeth Howard, Duchess of Norfolk (née Lady Elizabeth Stafford; c. 1497 – 30 November 1558) was an English aristocrat and noblewoman. She was the eldest daughter of Edward Stafford, 3rd Duke of Buckingham and Lady Eleanor Percy. Her abusive marriage to Thomas Howard, 3rd Duke of Norfolk, whom she married at age 15, created a public scandal.

== Family ==
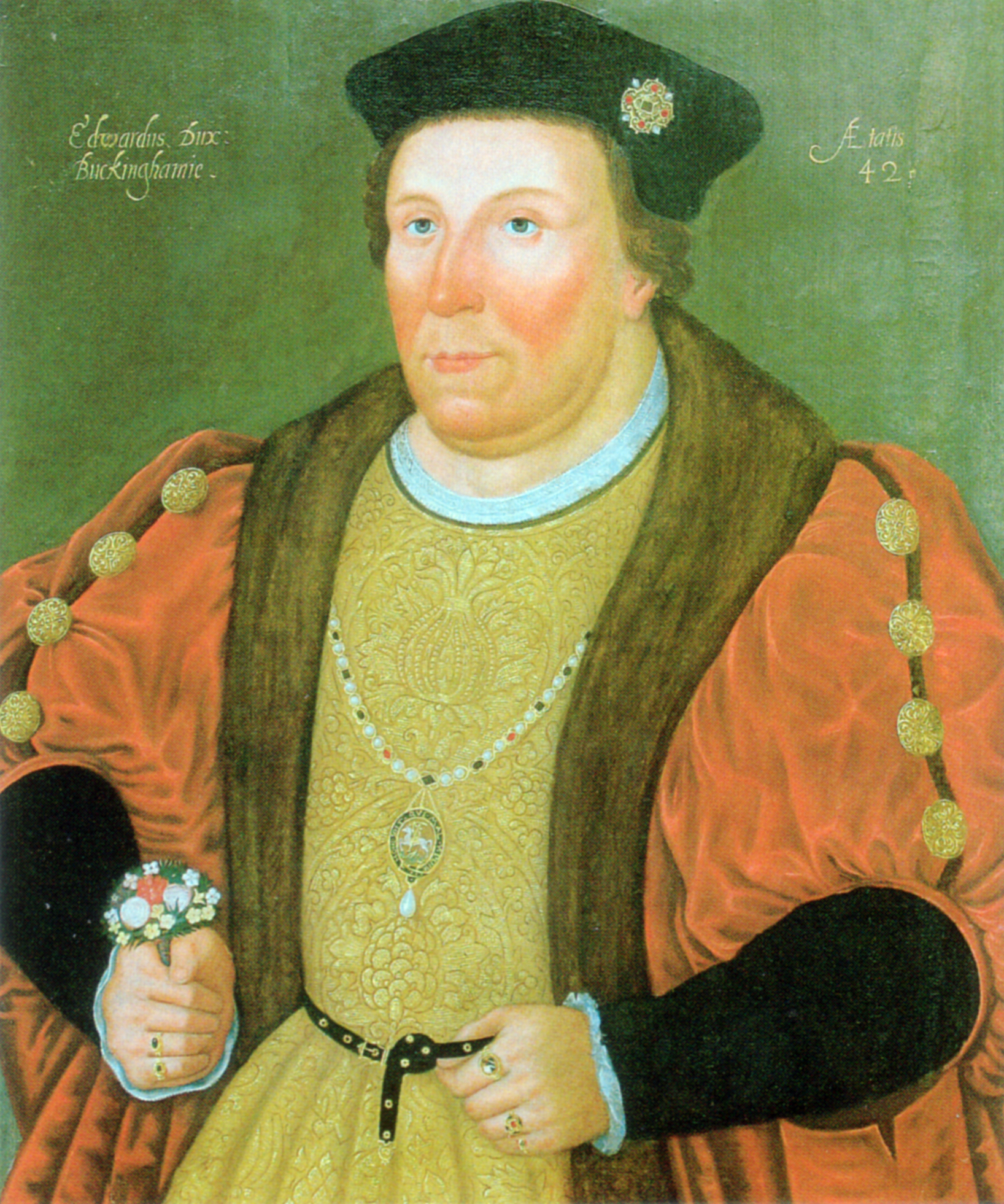
Elizabeth Stafford's father, Edward Stafford, 3rd Duke of Buckingham

Lady Elizabeth Stafford, born about 1497, was the eldest daughter of Edward Stafford, 3rd Duke of Buckingham, and Eleanor Percy (d. 1530). Her paternal grandmother, Lady Catherine Woodville was sister of Queen Elizabeth Woodville and hence sister-in-law of King Edward IV of England. Her paternal grandfather, Henry Stafford, 2nd Duke of Buckingham, was executed for treason in 1483 by King Richard III, and in 1521 her own father suffered the same fate when he was beheaded on Tower Hill for treason against King Henry VIII.

== Early life ==
Lady Elizabeth lived at home until at least 1508. According to Harris, Lady Elizabeth's father saw that all his children received some education and her literacy is attested to by the fact that she was described by the poet John Skelton as an admirer, friend of the muses and his particular patron. Elizabeth came to court in 1509 as a lady-in-waiting to Catherine of Aragon, and became the Queen's lifelong friend.

== Marriage ==
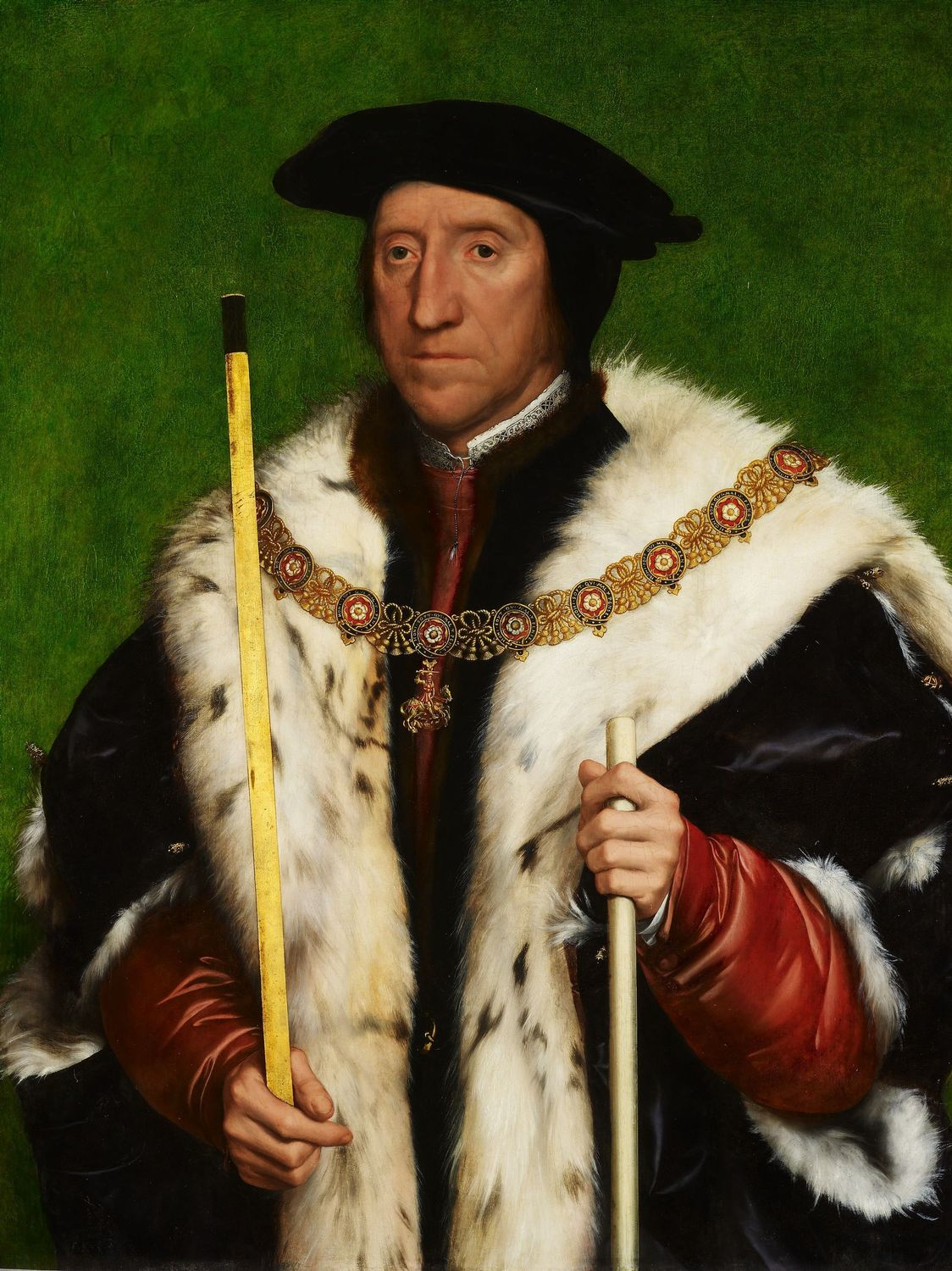
Elizabeth Stafford's husband, Thomas Howard, 3rd Duke of Norfolk

Before 8 January 1513, when she was only fifteen and he was in his late thirties, Lady Elizabeth became the second wife of Thomas Howard, Earl of Surrey. He was the widower of Anne, daughter of King Edward IV.

Lady Elizabeth had earlier been promised in marriage to her father's ward, Ralph Neville, 4th Earl of Westmorland. The young Elizabeth and Westmorland seem to have been mutually devoted, and years later, in a letter to Thomas Cromwell dated 28 September 1537, Elizabeth recalled that:

He and I had loved together two years, an my lord my husband had not sent immediately word after my lady and my lord's first wife was dead, he made suit to my lord my father, or else I had been married before Christmas to my Lord of Westmorland'.

Lady Elizabeth's father initially attempted to persuade Surrey to marry one of his other daughters, but according to her, "He would have none of my sisters, but only me".

Lady Elizabeth brought Surrey a dowry of 2,000 marks, and was promised a jointure of 500 marks a year, although Surrey apparently never kept that promise. In her later letters, she asserted that she had been a dutiful wife, continuing to serve at court daily "sixteen years together" while her husband was absent in King Henry VIII's wars, and accompanying him to Ireland when he was posted there in 1520–22. They had five children, and according to Graves, as late as 1524, when he became Duke of Norfolk, "they appeared to be bonded by mutual love". Elizabeth's father, meanwhile, had been executed for treason in May 1521.

However, in 1527 Norfolk took a mistress, Bess Holland, the daughter of his steward, with whom he lived openly at Kenninghall, and whom the Duchess described variously in her letters as a bawd, a drab, and "a churl's daughter ... which was but washer of my nursery eight years'. It appears the Duchess' anger caused her to exaggerate Bess Holland's inferior social status, as her family were probably minor gentry, and she eventually became a lady-in-waiting to Anne Boleyn.

During the long period in which King Henry VIII sought to have his marriage to Catherine of Aragon annulled, the Duchess remained staunchly loyal to Queen Catherine and antagonistic towards her husband's niece, Anne Boleyn, with whom the King was infatuated. Late in 1530 it was noted that the Duchess was secretly conveying letters to Queen Catherine from Italy concealed in oranges, which Catherine passed on to the Imperial ambassador, Eustace Chapuys, and at one time the Duchess told Chapuys that her husband had confided in her that Anne would be 'the ruin of all her family'. In 1531, the Duchess was exiled from court at Anne Boleyn's request for too freely declaring her loyalty to Catherine.

According to Graves, the Duchess also quarrelled with Anne over Anne's insistence that the Duchess's daughter, Mary Howard, should marry Henry VIII's illegitimate son, Henry FitzRoy. When Anne was crowned queen on 1 June 1533, the Duchess refused to attend the coronation "from the love she bore to the previous Queen".

Meanwhile, the Duchess's own marriage continued to deteriorate. Norfolk refused to give up his mistress, and resolved to separate from his wife. Both Norfolk and Thomas Cromwell requested the Duchess's brother to take her in, a suggestion he rejected. The Duchess wrote of her husband's abuse of her during this period, claiming that when she was recovering after the birth of her daughter, Mary, he had pulled her out of bed by the hair, dragged her through the house, and wounded her with a dagger. In three separate letters to Cromwell the Duchess repeated the accusation that Norfolk had "set his women to bind me till blood came out at my fingers' ends, and pinnacled me, and sat on my breast till I spit blood, and he never punished them". Norfolk responded to the allegations by writing that "I think the apparent false lies were never contrived by a wife of her husband that she doth daily increase of me".

Continued cohabitation was clearly impossible, and on 23 March 1534 Norfolk forced a separation. According to the Duchess, the Duke had ridden all night, and arriving home in a furious temper had locked her in a chamber and taken away all her jewels and apparel. She was sent to a house in Redbourn, Hertfordshire, from which she wrote a number of letters to Cromwell complaining that she was kept in a state of virtual imprisonment with a meagre annual allowance of only £200. At first the Duchess attempted to reconcile with her husband, but when she received no reply to her 'kind letters' to the Duke, she declared to Cromwell in a letter dated 30 December 1536 that 'from this day forward I will never sue to the King, nor to none other, to desire my lord my husband to take me again'. On his part, Norfolk refused to give up Bess Holland, and attempted to persuade the Duchess to agree to a divorce, offering to return her jewels and apparel and give her a great part of his plate and stuff of household, but she rebuffed his offers. She received little or no support from her family. Her eldest son and daughter became estranged from her, while her brother condemned her behaviour.

Forsaken by almost everyone, the Duchess remained obdurate. On 3 March 1539, she wrote to Cromwell that:

I am of age to rule myself, as I have done these five years, since my husband put me away. Seeing that my lord my husband reckoned me to be so unreasonable, it were better that I kept me away, and keep my own house still, and trouble no other body ... I pray you, my lord, take no displeasure with me, although I have not followed your lordship's good counsel, and your letters, as touching my lord my husband for to come home again, which I will never do in my life.

== Final years ==
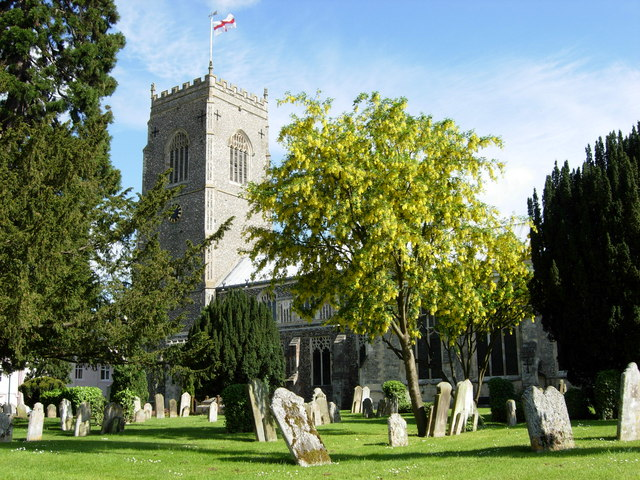
Framlingham Church, burial place of Elizabeth Stafford's husband

The Duchess's entreaties to Cromwell ceased with his fall from power in 1540. She and her brother were eventually reconciled, and at some time before 1547 he sent one of his daughters to live with her, whom the Duchess treated very generously.

During Henry VIII's last years Edward Seymour, 1st Earl of Hertford, and Henry's last wife, Catherine Parr, both of whom favoured the reformed faith, gained influence with the King while the conservative Duke of Norfolk became isolated politically. The Duke attempted to form an alliance with the Seymours through a marriage between his widowed daughter, Mary Howard, and Hertford's brother, Thomas Seymour, but the effort was forestalled by the provocative conduct of the Duke's eldest son and heir, Henry Howard, Earl of Surrey, who had displayed in his own heraldry the royal arms and insignia. On 12 December 1546 both Norfolk and Surrey were arrested and sent to the Tower. On 12 January 1547 Norfolk acknowledged that he had 'concealed high treason, in keeping secret the false acts of my son, Henry Earl of Surrey, in using the arms of St. Edward the Confessor, which pertain only to kings', and offered his lands to the King. Norfolk's family, including the Duchess, his daughter Mary, and his mistress, Bess Holland, all gave evidence against him. Surrey was beheaded on 19 January 1547, and on 27 January 1547 Norfolk was attainted by statute without trial. The dying King gave his assent to Norfolk's death by royal commissioners, and it was rumoured that he would be executed on the following day. He was saved by the King's death on 28 January and the council's decision not to inaugurate the new reign with bloodshed.

Norfolk remained in the Tower throughout the reign of King Edward VI. He was released and pardoned by Queen Mary I in 1553, and in Mary's first parliament (October–December 1553), his statutory attainder was declared void, thereby restoring him to the dukedom. He died at Kenninghall on 25 August 1554, and was buried at St. Michael's Church at Framlingham in Suffolk. The Duchess was not named in his will.

In July 1557 she officiated as godmother at the baptism of her great-grandson, Philip Howard, holding the child over a gold baptismal font which was kept in the Treasury and normally used only for the baptism of royal children.

Elizabeth Howard died 30 November 1558 at Lambeth, and was buried in the Howard chapel in the Church of St Mary-at-Lambeth. Her brother wrote a brief but apparently heartfelt epitaph:

Thou wast to me, both far and near,
A mother, sister, a friend most dear.

== Issue ==
By Thomas Howard, 3rd Duke of Norfolk, Elizabeth had two sons and three daughters:

- Henry Howard, Earl of Surrey, (1516/7-1547), who married Frances de Vere, daughter of John de Vere, 15th Earl of Oxford, by whom he had two sons and three daughters, Thomas Howard, 4th Duke of Norfolk; Henry Howard, 1st Earl of Northampton; Katherine Howard, who married Henry Berkeley, 7th Baron Berkeley; Margaret Howard, who married Henry Scrope, 9th Baron Scrope of Bolton; and Jane Howard, who married Charles Neville, 6th Earl of Westmorland. In 1548, after Surrey's execution, his children were placed in the care of their aunt, Mary Howard who appointed the martyrologist, John Foxe, as their tutor.
- Lady Katherine Howard (1518–1530), who by 9 December 1529 married, as his first wife, Edward Stanley, 3rd Earl of Derby (1509–1572), and died 15 March 1530. Derby later married, as his second wife, Katherine's aunt, Dorothy Howard.
- Lady Mary Howard (1519–1557), who married, on 28 November 1533, King Henry VIII's illegitimate son, Henry FitzRoy (1519–1536), by whom she had no issue.
- Thomas Howard, 1st Viscount Howard of Bindon (1520–1582), who married firstly Elizabeth Marney, secondly Gertrude Lyte, thirdly Mabel Burton, and fourthly Margaret Manning.
- Lady Muriel Howard (died young).
