= William Stafford (author) =

William Stafford (1593–1684), was born in Norfolk, England and was an English landowner. He was the son of the conspirator William Stafford and his wife Anne Gryme.

== Biography ==
He was the author of The Reason of the War, with the Progress and Accidents Thereof, Written by an English Subject which was published in 1646, which argued for Charles I to give more power to Parliament.

The Jacobite pamphleteer Richard Stafford was his grandson.
