= Henry Percy, 4th Earl of Northumberland =

English aristocrat (c.1449–1489)

Henry Percy
- Earl of Northumberland
- Quartered arms
- Born: 1449; Leconfield, Yorkshire, England
- Died: 28 April 1489 (aged 39–40); South Kilvington, Yorkshire, England
- Noble family: Percy
- Spouse: Maud Herbert
- Issue: Eleanor Percy, Duchess of Buckingham; Henry Algernon Percy, 5th Earl of Northumberland; Sir William Percy; Alan Percy; Sir Josceline Percy; Arundel Percy; Anne Percy, Countess of Arundel; Elizabeth Percy
- Father: Henry Percy, 3rd Earl of Northumberland
- Mother: Eleanor Poynings

Henry Percy, 4th Earl of Northumberland KG (c. 1449 – 28 April 1489) was an English aristocrat during the Wars of the Roses. After losing his title when his father was killed fighting the Yorkists, he later regained his position. He led the rearguard of Richard III's army at the Battle of Bosworth in 1485, but failed to commit his troops. He was briefly imprisoned by Henry VII, but later restored to his position. A few years later he was murdered by citizens of York during a revolt against Henry VII's taxation.

== Origins ==
Percy was the son of Henry Percy, 3rd Earl of Northumberland, and his wife Eleanor Poynings.

His father was first cousin to (among others) Edward IV of England, Anne, Duchess of Exeter, Edmund, Earl of Rutland, Elizabeth, Duchess of Suffolk, Margaret of York, George, Duke of Clarence, and Richard III of England. Percy himself was second cousin to (among others) Elizabeth of York, Edward V of England, Richard, Duke of York, Arthur Plantagenet, 1st Viscount Lisle, Margaret Pole, Countess of Salisbury, Edward, Earl of Warwick, and Edward of Middleham. Both Perkin Warbeck and Lambert Simnel claimed to be his second cousins.

== Loss and restoration of title ==
His father was loyal to the House of Lancaster. His wife, Maud Herbert, had in fact been first betrothed to Henry of Richmond, who would claim and win the throne in 1485, becoming Henry VII. His father was killed in the Battle of Towton on 29 March 1461. The earldom of Northumberland was forfeited to the victorious Yorkists. The adolescent Percy was imprisoned in the Fleet Prison. He was transported to the Tower of London in 1464.

In 1465, John Neville was named Earl of Northumberland in his place. Percy eventually swore fealty to Edward IV and was released in 1469. He petitioned for the return of his paternal titles and estates to him. He gained support from Edward IV himself. John Neville had to quit his title and was instead named Marquess of Montagu in 1470. However, the restoration of the title to Percy was delayed by the Parliament of England until 1473. He was made a Knight of the Garter in 1474 by Edward IV.

For the following twelve years, Percy held many of the important government posts in northern England, such as warden of the east and middle marches, which were traditional in his family.

== Bosworth campaign and aftermath ==
He commanded the Yorkist reserve at the Battle of Bosworth Field on 22 August 1485. Percy never committed his forces to the battle. His inactivity played an important part in the defeat and death of Richard III. Historians suspect him of treason in favour of victor Henry VII of England, although there is an alternative theory that his forces, placed behind those of King Richard, were in no position to take part in the battle before Richard was killed.

Percy was arrested along with Ralph Neville, 3rd Earl of Westmorland and Thomas Howard, 2nd Duke of Norfolk. He was nominally imprisoned for several months but swore allegiance to the new King. Henry VII released him on terms of good behaviour. Percy was allowed to retain his titles and lands as well as being allowed to return to his old posts, and was in fact sent on diplomatic missions for the crown, something that would not have occurred had Henry VII not trusted him implicitly.

== Marriage and children ==
At some time between 1473 and 1476 he married Maud Herbert (died before 1485), daughter of William Herbert, 1st Earl of Pembroke and his wife Anne Devereux. Their children included:

- Henry Algernon Percy (died 1527), his heir, who married Catherine Spencer.
- Eleanor Percy (died 1530), who first married Edward Stafford, 3rd Duke of Buckingham.
- Sir William Percy (died 1540), who married firstly Agnes Constable, widow of Sir Henry Ughtred (1477–1510) and secondly Margaret Sothill, widow of Sir John Normanville.
- Alan Percy (died 1560), who became Master of St John's College, Cambridge.
- Sir Josceline Percy (died 1532), who married Margaret Frost and was grandfather to Thomas Percy.
- Anne Percy (died 1552), who married as his second wife William FitzAlan, 11th Earl of Arundel.

== Death ==
In April 1489, Percy held temporary residence in his estates of Yorkshire. Henry VII had recently allied himself to Anne of Brittany against Charles VIII of France. Taxes rose to finance the military action. Sir John Egremont of Yorkshire led a riot in protest at the high taxation, known as the Yorkshire rebellion of 1489. Percy was targeted by the rioters as he approached the city and was slain on 28 April. He was buried at Beverley Minster.

== Notes ==
Peerage of England
Preceded by John Neville	Earl of Northumberland; 1470–1489	Succeeded by Henry Algernon Percy
Preceded by Eleanor Percy	Baron Poynings; 1482–1489	Succeeded by Henry Algernon Percy
