= Eleanor Percy, Duchess of Buckingham =

English duchess

Eleanor Percy
- Duchess of Buckingham
- Born: c. 1474; Leconfield, Yorkshire, England
- Died: 13 February 1530 (aged around 56)
- Noble family: Percy
- Spouses: Edward Stafford, 3rd Duke of Buckingham; John Audley
- Issue: Lady Elizabeth Stafford; Lady Katherine Stafford; Lady Mary Stafford; Henry Stafford, 1st Baron Stafford
- Father: Henry Percy, 4th Earl of Northumberland
- Mother: Lady Maud Herbert

Eleanor Percy, Duchess of Buckingham (c. 1474 – 13 February 1530), was the eldest daughter of Henry Percy, 4th Earl of Northumberland, by his wife, Lady Maud Herbert, daughter of William Herbert, 1st Earl of Pembroke. Eleanor Percy married Edward Stafford, 3rd Duke of Buckingham, who was beheaded in 1521 on charges of plotting to overthrow the king, Henry VIII. As a result, the Dukedom of Buckingham and estates were forfeited, and her children lost their inheritance.

== Biography ==
Eleanor Percy was born about 1474 in Leconfield, Yorkshire. On 14 December 1490, at about sixteen years of age, Eleanor married Edward Stafford, 3rd Duke of Buckingham, who was five years old when his father, the rebellious 2nd Duke of Buckingham, was attainted and executed for high treason. Edward Stafford's mother, Catherine Woodville, went on to marry Jasper Tudor, the first Duke of Bedford and thirdly, Richard Wingfield.

Two years after his father's execution, when Henry VII ascended the throne, the attainder was reversed, and the title and estates of Edward's father were restored to him. At seven, Edward became the third Duke of Buckingham and also the ward of King Henry VII's mother, Lady Margaret Beaufort.

After Edward's death, Eleanor remarried to John Audley. Her second marriage was childless.

== Children ==
Eleanor Percy bore her first husband, Edward Stafford, four children:

1. Lady Elizabeth Stafford (1497 – 30 November 1558); married Thomas Howard, 3rd Duke of Norfolk and had issue.
2. Lady Catherine Stafford (born abt. 1499 – 14 May 1555); married Ralph Neville, 4th Earl of Westmorland and had issue.
3. Lady Mary Stafford; married George Nevill, 5th Baron Bergavenny and had issue.
4. Henry Stafford, 1st Baron Stafford (18 September 1501 – 30 April 1563); married Ursula Pole, Baroness Stafford, daughter of Margaret Pole, 8th Countess of Salisbury, and had issue.

== Sources ==
- B.J.Harris, Edward Stafford, third duke of Buckingham (1986)
- C.Rawcliffe, The Staffords, earls of Stafford and dukes of Buckingham, 1394-1521, Cambridge Studies in Medieval Life and Thought, 3rd ser., 11 (1978)
