= Stafford Castle =

Grade II listed castle near the town of Stafford

- Staffordshire, England
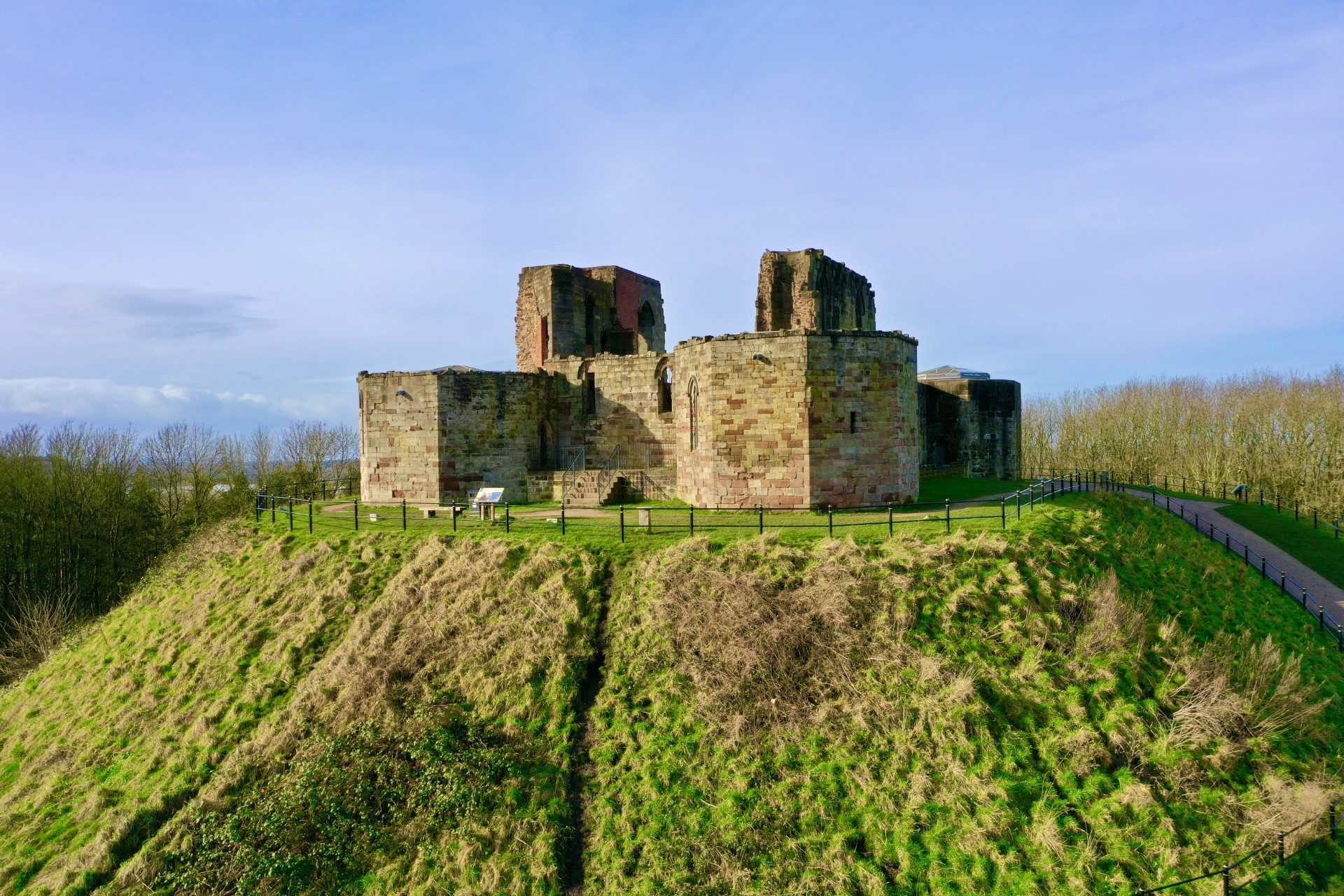
- Stafford Castle Keep

Site information
- Type: Motte and bailey, later Gothic Revival

Location
- Shown within Staffordshire
- Location within Staffordshire
- Coordinates: 52.7973°N 2.1468°W
- Grid reference: grid reference SJ902222

Site history
- Events: www.freedom-leisure.co.uk/stafford-castle/

Stafford Castle is an ancient Grade II listed castle situated 2 miles (3.2 km) west of the town of Stafford in Staffordshire, England. From the time of the Norman Conquest and as recorded in the Domesday Book of 1086 it was the seat of the powerful Anglo-Norman Stafford family (originally de Tosny, later via a female line de Stafford), feudal barons of Stafford, later Barons Stafford (1299) by writ, Earls of Stafford (1351) and Dukes of Buckingham (1444). The 14th-century stone keep was demolished in 1643, during the Civil War, having been held for the Royalists by Lady Isabel Stafford. The castle was remodelled in the early 19th century by the Jerningham family in the Gothic Revival style, on the foundations of the medieval structure, and incorporates much of the original stonework. Today the A518 Stafford-to-Newport Road passes next to it and it is a prominent local landmark visible from the M6 motorway and from the West Coast inter-city mainline.

== History ==
=== A Saxon castle at Stafford ===
The early historian of Staffordshire Robert Plot cited the Anglo-Saxon Chronicle (104) for evidence that Æthelflæd, the Saxon warrior-princess and ruler of the Mercians, built a castle at Stafford in the year 913, along with an adjacent burg (meaning a fortified town). However, the exact site of this first castle, probably made of wood, is now unknown.

=== Medieval ===
==== Saxon ====
Shortly before the castle was built the Saxon Eadric the Wild had led a failed rebellion which culminated in the defeat of the Saxons at the Battle of Stafford in 1069.

==== Norman ====
A wooden castle was built on the site at some time in the 1070s by the Norman magnate Robert de Stafford (c.1039–c.1100) (alias Robert de Tosny/Toeni, etc.) who arrived in England during or shortly after the Norman Conquest of 1066 and was awarded by King William the Conqueror 131 manors in his newly conquered kingdom, predominantly in the county of Staffordshire. Thus he was able to control and extract taxes from the native Anglo-Saxon community and to prepare for the Norman invasion of Wales in 1081. The castle was originally a timber and earth fortification, built on modified glacial deposit. The first castle was built in the usual form of a motte and bailey.

Ralph de Stafford, 1st Earl of Stafford, one of the King's leading commanders in the first phases of the Hundred Years' War, sealed a contract with a master mason in 1347, ordering a stone castle to be built on the castle mound. The rectangular stone keep originally had a tower in each corner, but was later adapted, with a fifth tower being added on in the middle of the north wall (actually facing west).

=== Early Modern ===
The stone castle reached its heyday during the time of Humphrey Stafford, 1st Duke of Buckingham (1402–1460), who was killed at the Battle of Northampton in 1460. His grandson Henry Stafford, 2nd Duke of Buckingham (1455–1483) had become a ward of the Yorkists and was initially a supporter of Richard III, but later rebelled in favour of the aborted invasion of Henry Tudor (Henry VII) in 1483, and paid with his life. His son Edward Stafford, 3rd Duke of Buckingham (1478–1521) escaped and was later restored to his lands by a grateful King Henry VII. In 1511 the 3rd Duke built himself a further grand residence at Thornbury Castle in Gloucestershire, effectively a fortified manor house. His royal blood made him a threat to Henry VIII, who had him executed in 1521, when the family's estates, including Stafford Castle and its deer parks, escheated to the Crown. The king's auditors commented favourably on the deer to be had in the parks and thought the castle might be a suitable stop-off on one of the King's progresses.

Stafford Castle, along with a small parcel of land, was restored to the later Staffords, but they never regained the wealth or status of earlier years. Through lack of maintenance, the keep fell into disrepair and in 1603 Edward Stafford, 3rd Baron Stafford referred in a letter to 'My rotten castle of Stafford.'

During the early phases of the Civil War in 1643 it was held by Lady Isabel Stafford (née Isabel Forster), a staunch Roman Catholic and Royalist, the widow of Edward Stafford, 4th Baron Stafford (1572–1625), who had been buried at the Castle Church, Stafford. The Parliamentarians had captured the town of Stafford on 15 May 1643, following a brief siege, but some of its garrison escaped and held Stafford Castle, in the hope of using it as a bridgehead to recapture the town. Colonel William Brereton rode up to the castle with some of his men and called upon Lady Stafford to surrender, to which she refused. In response "some of the poor outhouses were set on fire to try whether these would work their spirits to any relenting. All in vain, for from the castle they shot some of our men and horses which did much enrage and provoke the rest to an act of fierce revenge. Almost all the dwelling houses and outhouses were burnt to the ground." The siege was raised when Colonel Hastings led a relief column which arrived on 5 June. Lady Stafford was eventually persuaded to leave, a small garrison remaining to defend the castle against a renewed siege. Finally, in late June, the Royalist garrison fled, having heard that a large Parliamentarian army was approaching, complete with siege cannon capable of overwhelming the small garrison. The castle then fell into Parliamentarian control and was demolished. On 22 December, not many months after its capture, the "Parliamentarian Committee of Stafford" ordered: "the Castle shall be forthwith demolished." When the traveller and diarist, Celia Fiennes passed through the town of Stafford in 1698, she noted: "...the castle which is now ruinated and there only remains on a hill the fortified trenches that are grown over green."

=== Re-emergence ===
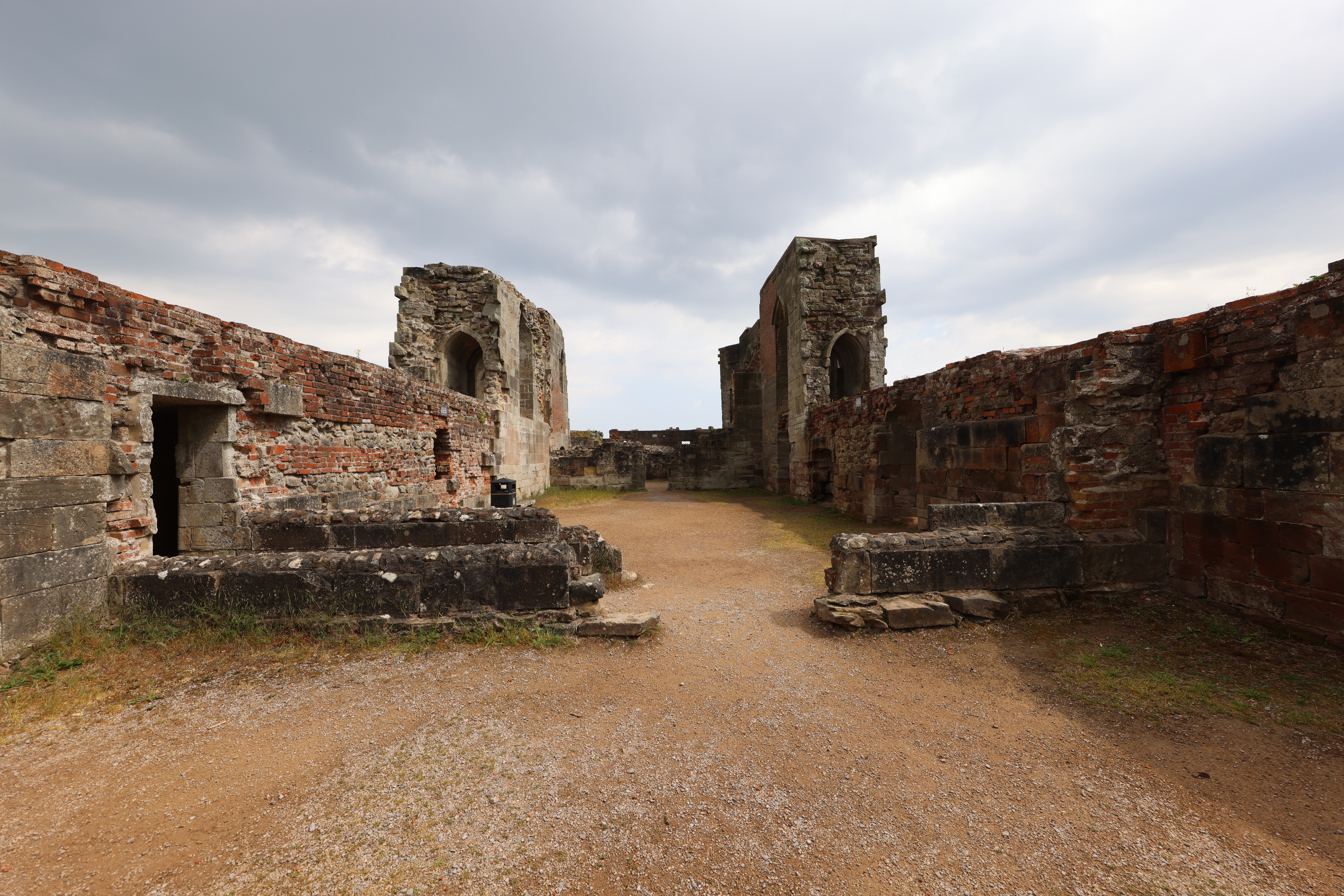
The interior of the rebuilt keep

By the 1790s only a single low wall remained to be seen above ground, and that was at risk of falling. Some workmen employed to underpin this wall discovered the buried castle basements and foundations, which ran off from the wall. Realising the likely extent of these basements, and the possibility of treasures within, they brought their discovery to the attention of Sir William Jerningham. Jerningham immediately ordered all the foundations and basements to be uncovered, and the whole mound to be cleared of overgrowth. The castle was partly rebuilt from 1815.

=== Post-World War II ===
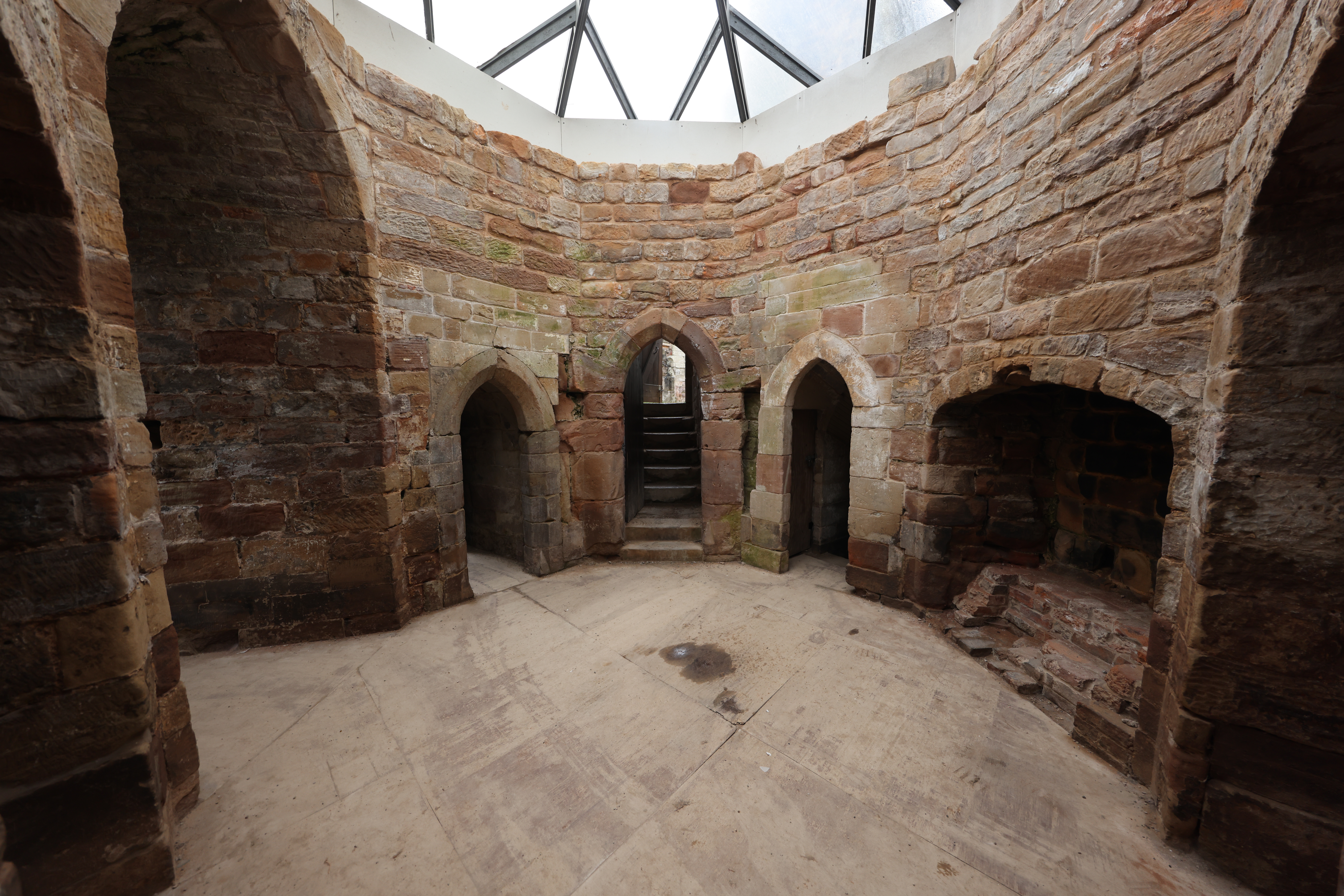
Interior of one of the towers at Stafford Castle

In the immediate post-war years, the mature woodland that surrounded the Keep was felled, which may have led to the structure being exposed to high winds. By 1949 large pieces of masonry had begun to fall from the towers, which were declared unsafe. Mr. and Mrs. Stokes, the last caretakers of the castle and its grounds, vacated the building that winter. The site became a target for vandals and in 1961 Lord Stafford gave the Keep to the local authority.

In 1978 professional excavations began to show the complex archaeology of the site, which had been for generations the seat of one of the most important families in the region. The excavations continued for many years, becoming one of the area's biggest employers of young people during the severe economic depression of the early 1980s. These excavations and establishment of a reconstructed medieval herb garden were documented over many years by the BBC.

On the site's official public opening in 1988, a heritage trail was established with signage and interpretation, and new fencing on improved trails. In 1992 a new purpose-built museum and gift/refreshments shop opened on-site below the castle mound.

== See also ==
- Castles in Great Britain and Ireland
- List of castles in England
- Listed buildings in Stafford (Outer Area)
