= Edward Stafford, 3rd Duke of Buckingham =

English nobleman (1478–1521)

Edward Stafford, 3rd Duke of Buckingham KG KB
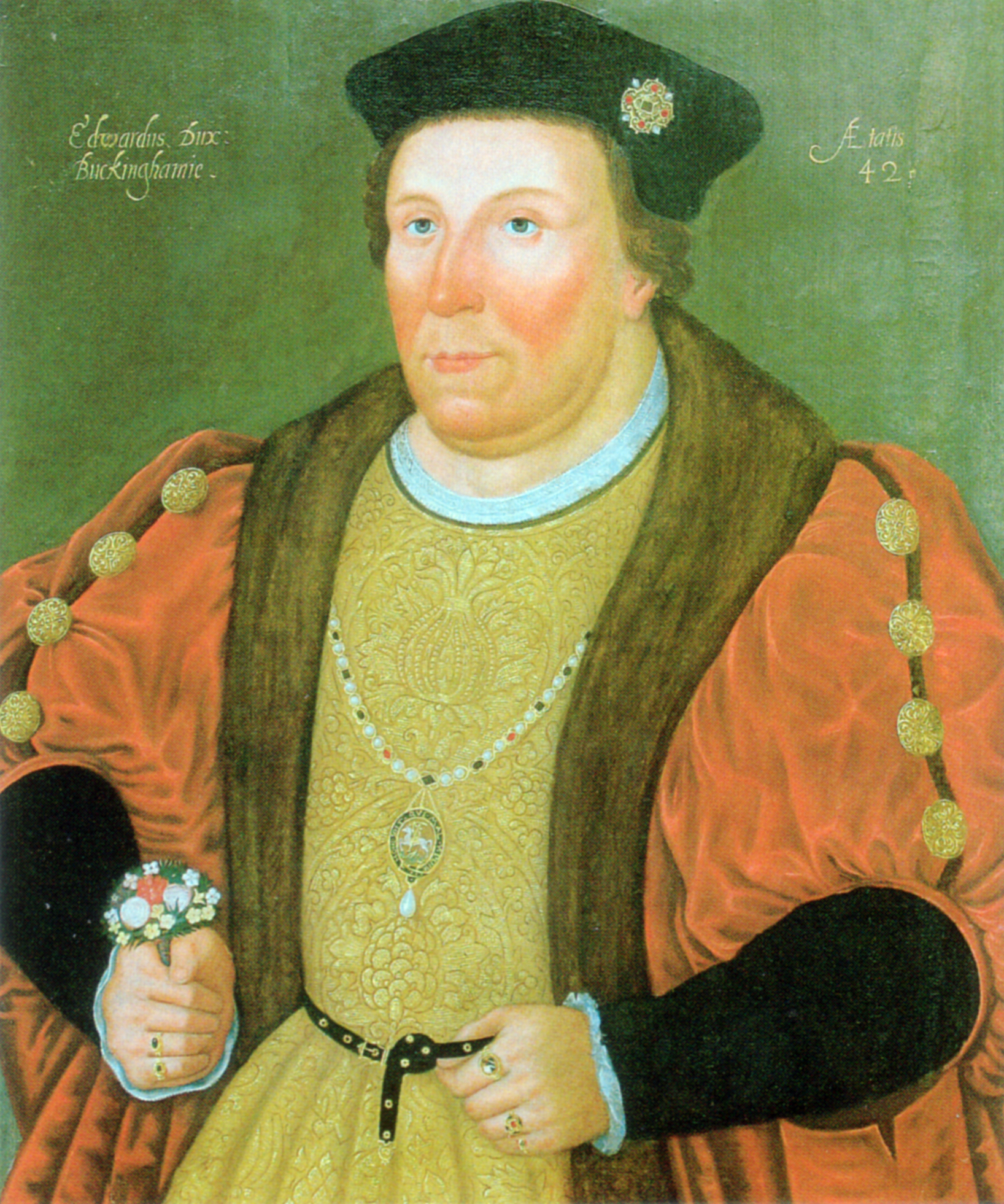
- Portrait of Edward Stafford, 3rd Duke of Buckingham, 1520, at Magdalene College, Cambridge (unknown artist)

Lord High Constable
- In office 1504–1521
- Monarch: Henry VIII
- Preceded by: The Lord Stanley
- Succeeded by: Merged in the crown

Lord High Steward
- In office 1509–1509
- Preceded by: Jasper Tudor, Duke of Bedford (1486)
- Succeeded by: Charles Brandon, 1st Duke of Suffolk (1533)

Personal details
- Born: 3 February 1478 Brecon Castle, Wales
- Died: 17 May 1521 (aged 43) Tower Hill
- Resting place: Austin Friars Church, London
- Spouse: Lady Eleanor Percy
- Relations: Stafford family
- Children: Elizabeth Stafford, Duchess of Norfolk; Katherine Stafford, Countess of Westmorland; Mary Stafford, Baroness Bergavenny; Henry Stafford, 1st Baron Stafford
- Parents: Henry Stafford, 2nd Duke of Buckingham; Lady Katherine Woodville

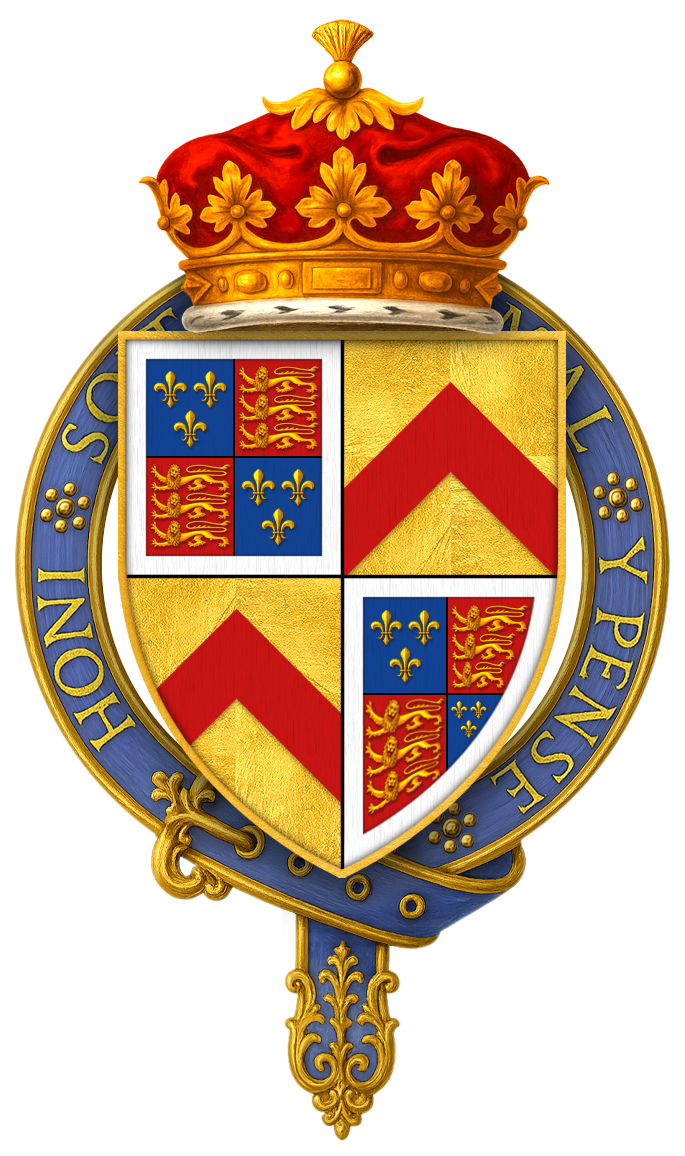
Arms of Edward Stafford, 3rd Duke of Buckingham, KG

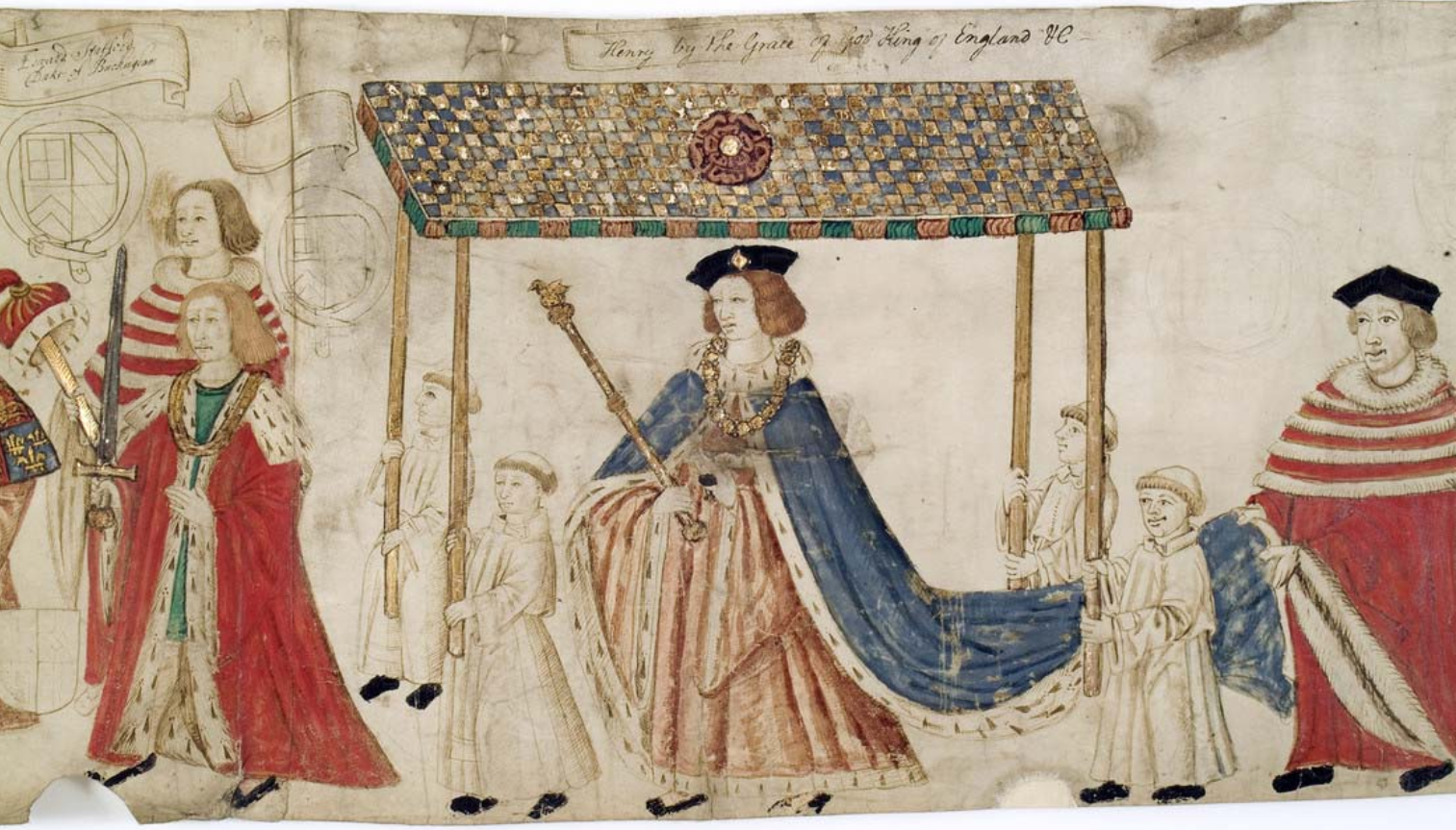
King Henry VIII aged 21, on his way to open Parliament on 4 February 1512. Edward Stafford, 3rd Duke of Buckingham, KG, walks ahead carrying the Sword of State. Another peer holds the Cap of Maintenance. Detail from The Procession of Parliament 1512, Library of Trinity College, Cambridge.

Edward Stafford, 3rd Duke of Buckingham KG KB (3 February 1478 – 17 May 1521), was an English nobleman. He was the son of Henry Stafford, 2nd Duke of Buckingham, and Katherine Woodville, and nephew of Elizabeth Woodville and King Edward IV. Thus, Edward Stafford was a first cousin once removed of King Henry VIII. He frequently attended the courts of Henry VII and Henry VIII. He was convicted of treason and executed on 17 May 1521.

== Family ==
Edward Stafford, born 3 February 1478 at Brecon Castle in Wales, was the eldest son of Henry Stafford, 2nd Duke of Buckingham, and Katherine Woodville (the daughter of Richard Woodville, 1st Earl Rivers, by Jacquetta of Luxembourg, daughter of Pierre de Luxembourg, Count of St. Pol) and was thus a nephew of Elizabeth Woodville and Edward IV.

By his father's marriage to Katherine Woodville, Stafford had a younger brother, Henry Stafford, 1st Earl of Wiltshire, (Note: According to Davies he may have had another brother, Humphrey Stafford, who died young.) and two sisters: Elizabeth, who married Robert Radcliffe, 1st Earl of Sussex, and Anne, who married firstly Sir Walter Herbert (d. 16 September 1507), an illegitimate son of William Herbert, 1st Earl of Pembroke, and secondly George Hastings, 1st Earl of Huntingdon.

After the execution of the 2nd Duke of Buckingham, his widow, Katherine Woodville, married Jasper Tudor, second son of Owen Tudor and Henry V's widow, Catherine of Valois. After Jasper Tudor's death on 21 December 1495, Katherine Woodville married Sir Richard Wingfield (d. 22 July 1525). Katherine Woodville died 18 May 1497. After her death, Wingfield married Bridget Wiltshire, daughter and heiress of Sir John Wiltshire of Stone, Kent.

== Career ==
In October 1483 his father rebelled against Richard III. He was beheaded without trial on 2 November 1483, whereby all his honours were forfeited. Stafford is said to have been hidden in various houses in Herefordshire at the time of the rebellion, and perhaps for the remainder of Richard III's reign. After Richard III's defeat at Bosworth on 22 August 1485, and Henry VII's accession to the crown, Stafford was made a Knight of the Order of the Bath on 29 October 1485 as Duke of Buckingham, and attended Henry VII's coronation the following day, although his father's attainder was not formally reversed by Parliament until November. The young duke's wardship and lands were granted, on 3 August 1486, along with the wardship of his younger brother, Henry Stafford, to the King's mother, Margaret Beaufort, and according to Davies it is likely Buckingham was educated in her various households.

Buckingham was in attendance at court at the elevation of Henry VII's second son, the future King Henry VIII, as Duke of York, on 9 November 1494, and was made a Knight of the Order of the Garter in 1495. In September 1497 he was a captain in the forces sent to quell a rebellion in Cornwall.

As a young man, Buckingham played a conspicuous part in royal weddings and the reception of ambassadors and foreign princes, "dazzling observers by his sartorial splendour". At the wedding of Henry VII's eldest son and heir Arthur, Prince of Wales, and Katherine of Aragon in 1501, he is said to have worn a gown worth £1500. He was the chief challenger at the jousting tournament held the following day.

At the accession of Henry VIII, Buckingham was appointed on 23 June 1509, for the day of the coronation only, Lord High Constable, an office which he claimed by hereditary right. He also served as Lord High Steward at the coronation and bearer of the crown. In 1509 he was made a member of the King's Privy Council. On 9 July 1510 he had licence to crenellate his manor of Thornbury, Gloucestershire, and according to Davies rebuilt the manor house as "an impressively towered castle" with "huge oriel windows in the living-quarters in the inner court".

In 1510 Buckingham was involved in a scandal concerning his sister, Anne, who was the wife of George Hastings, 1st Earl of Huntingdon. After hearing rumours concerning her and Sir William Compton, Buckingham found Compton in Anne's room. Compton was forced to take the sacrament to prove that he and Anne had not committed adultery, and Anne's husband sent her away to a convent 60 miles (100 km) from the court. There is no extant evidence establishing that Anne and Sir William Compton were guilty of adultery. In 1523 Compton took the unusual step of bequeathing land to Anne in his will, and directing his executors to include her in the prayers for his kin for which he had made provision in his will. There are some suggestions that the affair continued until 1513. Other rumours are that the affair was with the King himself. Buckingham returned to the King's graces, being present at the marriage of Henry's sister, served in Parliament and was present at the Field of the Cloth of Gold negotiations with Francis I of France and at negotiations with Charles V, Holy Roman Emperor.

From June to October 1513 Buckingham served as a captain during Henry VIII's invasion of France, commanding 500 men in the "middle ward". About 1517 he was one of 12 challengers chosen to joust against the king and his companions but excused himself on the ground that he feared to run against the King's person. He and his wife, Eleanor, attended the Field of the Cloth of Gold in 1520.

Although Buckingham was appointed to commissions of the peace in 1514 and charged—together with other Marcher lords—with responsibility for keeping order in south Wales, particularly along the borderland Welsh Marches, he was rebuked by the king in 1518 for failing to achieve the desired results. Buckingham exercised little direct political influence and was never a member of the King's inner circle.

Buckingham's literary patronage included two translations, a printed translation of Helyas, Knyghte of the Swanne (on the Knight of the Swan), which he commissioned in 1512, and A Lytell Cronicle, a translation of an account of the Near East which he may have commissioned in 1520 in connection with his proposed pilgrimage to Jerusalem.

== Betrayal and execution ==
Buckingham was one of few peers with substantial Plantagenet blood (Stafford was descended from John of Gaunt through his paternal grandmother Margaret Beaufort, daughter of Edmund, 2nd Duke of Somerset) and maintained numerous connections, often among his extended family, with the rest of the upper aristocracy, activities which attracted Henry's suspicion. During 1520, Buckingham became suspect of potentially treasonous actions, and Henry authorised an investigation, ordering Cardinal Wolsey to watch him. The king personally examined witnesses against him, gathering enough evidence for a trial. The duke was finally summoned to Court in April 1521 and arrested and placed in the Tower. He was tried before a panel of 17 peers, being accused of listening to prophecies of the king's death and intending to kill the king. Buckingham was executed on Tower Hill on 17 May 1521 and posthumously attainted by Act of Parliament on 31 July 1523, disinheriting his children from most of his wealth.

Some conclude this was one of the few executions of high personages under Henry VIII in which the accused was "almost certainly guilty". However, Sir Thomas More complained that the key evidence was hearsay from servants who, as commoners, were threatened and tortured to extract false confessions.

== Marriage and issue ==
In 1488, Henry VII had suggested a marriage between Buckingham and Anne of Brittany, but in December 1489 the executors of Henry Percy, 4th Earl of Northumberland, paid the king £4,000 for Buckingham's marriage to Percy's eldest daughter Eleanor (d. 1530). They had a son and three daughters:

- Henry Stafford, 1st Baron Stafford (18 September 1501 – 30 April 1563), who married Ursula Pole, daughter of Sir Richard Pole by his wife, Margaret, Countess of Salisbury, daughter of George, Duke of Clarence.
- Lady Elizabeth Stafford (c. 1497 – 30 November 1558), the second wife of Thomas Howard, 3rd Duke of Norfolk.
- Lady Katherine Stafford (c. 1499 – 14 May 1555), who married Ralph Neville, 4th Earl of Westmorland.
- Lady Mary Stafford, the youngest daughter, who married, about June 1519, as his third wife, George Neville, 5th Baron Bergavenny.

Buckingham is also said to have had three (Note: Davies names only two illegitimate children, Henry and Margaret.) illegitimate children:

- George Stafford.
- Henry Stafford, who represented Stafford in Parliament 1545–1555.
- Margaret Stafford (c. 1511 – 25 May 1537), whom Buckingham married to his ward, Thomas Fitzgerald of Leixlip, half-brother to the Earl of Kildare.

== In fiction ==
- The accusation and condemnation of Buckingham is depicted in the Shakespeare play Henry VIII.
- In the 2003 two-part drama Henry VIII starring Ray Winstone and Helena Bonham Carter, Buckingham is played by Charles Dance. His character was a minor one, killed off in the first 15 minutes.
- Buckingham is a character in the first two episodes of the first season of the drama series The Tudors in 2007. Portrayed by Steven Waddington, Buckingham's intrigues are fictionalised, with several key facts omitted.
- Buckingham's (fictional) son is a character in the novel The Blanket of the Dark, by John Buchan (1931). He has grown up as Peter Pentecost in the forests near Oxford and is told of his true heritage in the year 1536. Later, he has a fateful encounter with the king and decides not to pursue a life of power.
- He is portrayed by Olly Rix in the 2019 Starz miniseries The Spanish Princess, where he is depicted early on as seducing one of Katherine of Aragon's ladies in waiting. In the second season his character is amalgamated with that of the historical Sir Francis Bryan when his character loses an eye at a jousting match and resorts to wearing an eye patch.

== Ancestry ==
Ancestors of Edward Stafford, 3rd Duke of Buckingham

16. Edmund Stafford, 5th Earl of Stafford
8. Humphrey Stafford, 1st Duke of Buckingham
17. Lady Anne of Gloucester
4. Humphrey Stafford, Earl of Stafford
18. Ralph Neville, 1st Earl of Westmorland
9. Lady Anne Neville
19. Lady Joan Beaufort
2. Henry Stafford, 2nd Duke of Buckingham
20. John Beaufort, 1st Earl of Somerset
10. Edmund Beaufort, 2nd Duke of Somerset
21. Lady Margaret Holland, Duchess of Clarence
5. Lady Margaret Beaufort, Countess of Stafford
22. Richard de Beauchamp, 13th Earl of Warwick
11. Lady Eleanor Beauchamp
23. Elizabeth de Berkeley
1. Edward Stafford, 3rd Duke of Buckingham
12. Sir Richard Wydeville
6. Richard Woodville, 1st Earl Rivers
26. Thomas Bedlisgate
13. Joan Bedlisgate
27. Joan Beauchamp
3. Catherine Woodville, Duchess of Buckingham
28. John of Luxembourg, Lord of Beauvoir
14. Peter of Luxembourg, Count of Saint-Pol
29. Marguerite of Enghien
7. Jacquetta of Luxembourg
30. Francis of Baux
15. Margaret de Baux
31. Sueva Orsini

== Notes ==
Court offices
Vacant Title last held by Jasper Tudor, Duke of Bedford	Lord High Steward; 1509	Vacant Title next held by Charles Brandon, 1st Duke of Suffolk
Political offices
Preceded by The Lord Stanley	Lord High Constable; 1504–1521	Merged in the crown
Peerage of England
Vacant Forfeit in 1483 Title last held by Henry Stafford	Duke of Buckingham; 1485–1521	Forfeit
