= Thomas Scott (died 1610) =

English politician

The Honourable Thomas Scott JP
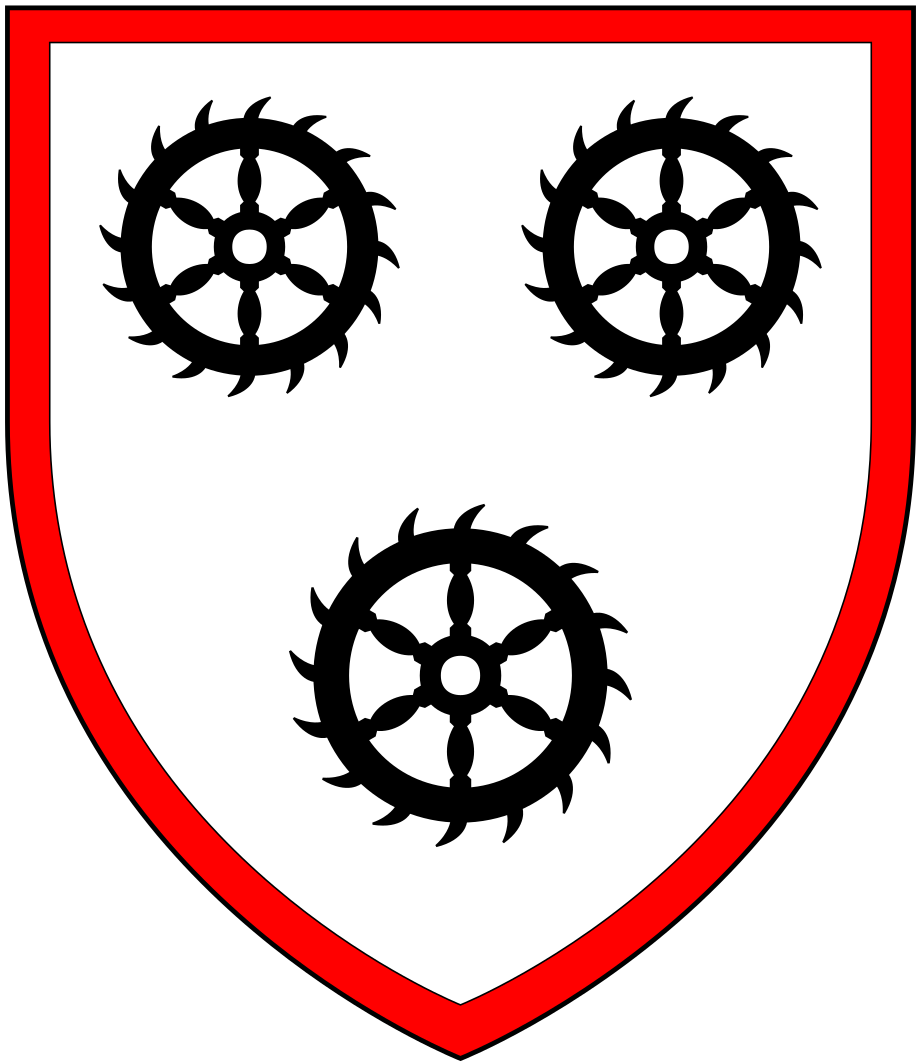
- Arms of Scott: Argent, three Catherine Wheels sable a bordure gules
- Born: c. 1563
- Died: 24 September 1610 (aged 46–47)
- Education: Hart Hall, Oxford
- Occupation: Politician
- Spouses: Mary Knatchbull (died) Elizabeth Honywood (m. 1587)
- Parents: Sir Thomas Scott; Elizabeth Baker
- Family: Scott

Thomas Scott (c. 1563 – 24 September 1610) of Scot's Hall, Smeeth, Kent, was an English landowner and politician who sat in the House of Commons from 1586 to 1587. He was elected MP for the seat of Aylesbury in 1586.

== Early life and family ==
Scott was the 1st son of Sir Thomas Scott (d. 1594) of Scot's Hall, Smeeth, Kent and his 1st wife, Elizabeth Baker, daughter of Sir John Baker of Sissinghurst.

He was a student at Hart Hall, Oxford where he matriculated on 20 May 1580, aged 17.

On the death of his father on 30 December 1594, he inherited seven manors, the Scot's Hall estate and all his goods.

=== Marriages and issue ===
He married, firstly, Mary Knatchbull, daughter of John Knatchbull, of Mersham, by whom he had a son, who died young.

He married, secondly, in about 1587, Elizabeth Honywood (d. 1627), daughter and heir of Thomas Honywood, of Sene, Newington, by whom he had no children.

== Career ==
He was a Member (MP) of the Parliament of England for Aylesbury in 1586.

He was a captain of a troop of Lancers, under his father as commander-in-chief of the Kentish forces, in 1588 and 1589, in anticipation of a second invasion of England by Philip of Spain.

From about 1596 he served as a justice of the peace (JP), quarter sessions in Kent, Sheriff of Kent from 1601 to 1602 and was a commissioner for the survey of crown lands in Kent in 1608.

== Death ==
He died without issue on 24 September 1610, leaving his brother John (d. 1616) as his heir. It is unknown where he was buried, but it was probably at Brabourne, where "many of the ancient Scott memorials have disappeared." His will has not survived, but an indenture notes that he left £2,000 to his niece, Elizabeth Scott, and his widow was to be taken care of by Sir John; on the latter’s death (in 1616), she was to receive an annuity of £240. She died in May 1627 and was buried in the parish church at Brabourne.

Parliament of England
Preceded by Thomas Tasburgh; John Smith	Member of Parliament for Aylesbury; 1586–1587; With: Thomas Tasburgh	Succeeded by Thomas Pigott; Henry Fleetwood
