= Henry Crispe =

16th-century English politician

Sir Henry Crispe (by 1505 – 21 August 1575) was an English landowner and politician.

== Family ==
Henry Crispe was the son of John Crispe of Quex, Birchington, Kent.

== Career ==
In 1544 he fought with the army in France when it captured the port of Boulogne. He was appointed Sheriff of Kent for 1546 and was knighted in 1553.

He was a Member of Parliament (MP) for Dover in March 1553 and of Winchelsea later in that same year. He was returned the member for Canterbury in 1558.

== Marriages and issue ==
Crispe married firstly Katherine Scott, the daughter of Sir John Scott of Scot's Hall in Smeeth, Kent, by whom he had a son, Nicholas.

He married secondly Anne Haselhurst, the daughter and coheir of George Haselhurst, by whom he had four sons and two daughters.

Crispe was succeeded by his second son John, his eldest son, Nicholas, having predeceased him in 1564.
