= Reginald Scot =

English politician and author (1538–1599)

The Honourable Reginald Scot
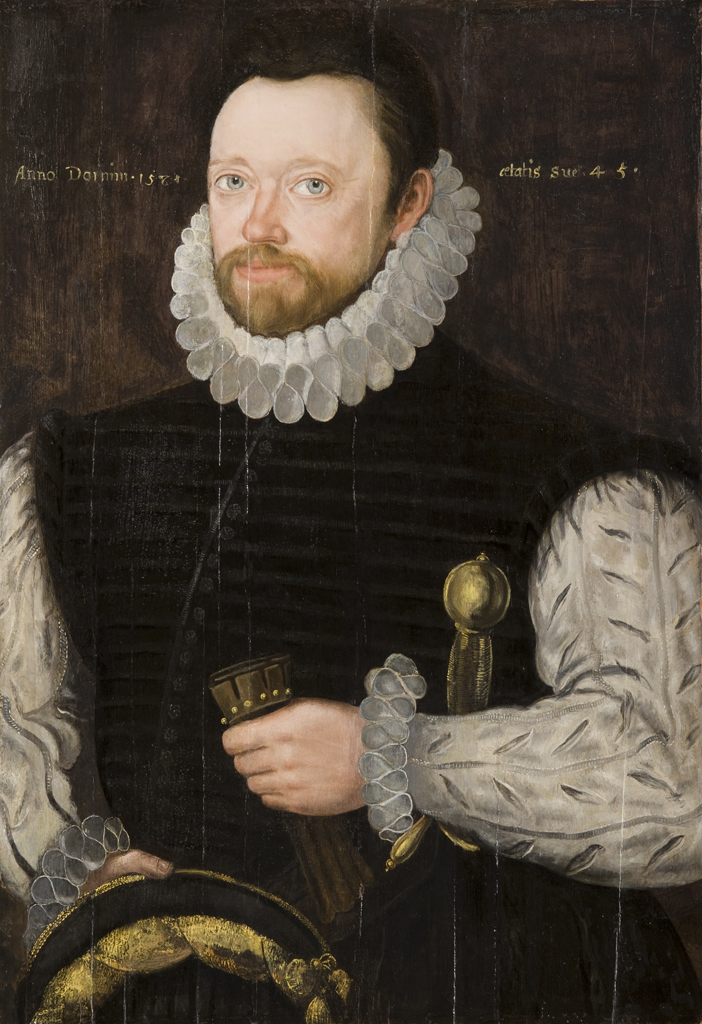
- Portrait of a Gentleman, possibly Reginald Scott, 1581
- Born: c. 1537
- Died: 9 October 1599 (aged 61–62); Smeeth, Kent
- Resting place: St Mary the Virgin's church, Brabourne; 51.1357°N 1.00549°E
- Education: Hart Hall, Oxford
- Occupations: Writer; Politician
- Known for: The Discoverie of Witchcraft
- Spouses: Jane Cobbe (m. 1568, died): Alice Collyar
- Children: with Jane: Elizabeth Scott
- Parents: Richard Scott; Mary Whetenall
- Relatives: Sir Thomas Scott (cousin)
- Family: Scott

Reginald Scot or Scott (c. 1537 – 9 October 1599) of Smeeth and Aldington, Kent, was an English politician and author who wrote The Discoverie of Witchcraft, which was published in 1584. It was written against the belief in witches, to show that witchcraft did not exist. Part of its content exposes how (apparently miraculous) feats of magic were done, and the book is deemed the first work, in English, "to present a detailed description of sleight of hand and conjuring."

== Life ==
He was the 1st son of Richard Scott, son of Sir John Scott (d. 1533) of Scots Hall in Smeeth, near Ashford in Kent. His mother was Mary Whetenall (d. 1582), daughter of George Whetenall of Hextall’s Place, East Peckham. His father died before 1544, and his mother remarried Fulk Onslow, clerk of the parliament; dying on 8 October 1582, she was buried in the church of Hatfield, Hertfordshire. Reginald or Reynold (as he signed his name in accordance with contemporary practice) was born about 1537.

When about eighteen, Scot entered Hart Hall, Oxford, but left the university without a degree. His writings show some knowledge of law, but he is not known to have joined any inn of court. Marrying in 1568, he seems to have spent the rest of his life in his native county. His time was mainly passed as an active country gentleman, managing property which he inherited from his kinsfolk about Smeeth and Brabourne, or directing the business affairs of his first cousin, Sir Thomas Scott, who proved a generous patron, and in whose house of Scots Hall he often stayed. He was collector of subsidies for the lathe (county subdivision) of Shepway in 1586 and 1587, and he was perhaps the Reginald Scot who acted in 1588 as a captain of untrained foot-soldiers at the county muster. He was returned to the parliament of 1589 as member for New Romney, "but there is no evidence to support the suggestion" that he was a justice of the peace (JP). He describes himself as "esquire" in the title-page of his Discoverie, and is elsewhere designated "armiger".

Scot married at Brabourne, on 11 October 1568, Jane Cobbe of Cobbes Place, in the parish of Aldington. By her he had a daughter Elizabeth, who married Sackville Turnor of Tablehurt, Sussex. Subsequently, Scot married a second wife, a widow named Alice Collyar, who had a daughter called Mary by her former husband.

Scot made his own will (drawing it with his own hand) on 15 September 1599. He died at Smeeth on 9 October following, and was probably buried in the church of St. Mary the Virgin, Brabourne, with his first wife Jane. His small properties about Brabourne, Aldington, and Romney Marsh he left to his widow. The last words of his will run: "Great is the trouble my poor wife hath had with me, and small is the comfort she hath received at my hands, whom if I had not matched withal I had not died worth one groat."

== Doctrine and espoused belief ==
In the Discoverie, Scot aligns himself with Reformed Protestantism, quoting John Calvin more than a dozen times. Calvin in turn was echoing the skepticism toward superstitions of early English reformer John Wycliffe. Scot expresses what is often called the Providential view in stating that "it is neither a witch, nor devil, but glorious God that maketh the thunder...God maketh the blustering tempests and whirlwinds..." This doctrine was also aligned with the tenth-century Canon Episcopi and Scot quotes from it. In the last half of the sixteenth century, an active theological debate continued from various pulpits throughout Europe – Calvinist, Lutheran, and Roman Catholic – between those who supported the skeptical Episcopi/Providential tradition and those who believed that witches could obtain real supernatural powers through an agreement or pact with the devil. The latter belief in the power of witches, and an intense phobia toward them, was associated by Scot with the book Malleus Maleficarum by the German inquisitor Heinrich Kramer, and upon this book Scot focuses the most criticism, and lumps others aligned with the same view of witchcraft: "...from whom [Jean] Bodin and all the other writers... do receive their light..."

A late twentieth-century historian argues that Scot was likely to have been influenced by, and perhaps was a member of, the Family of Love. An intriguing clue to this theory is the name Abraham Fleming written backwards (Gnimelf Maharba) in Scot's lengthy bibliography in the front pages of the Discoverie.

== Works ==
=== About hops cultivation ===
In 1574 he published his Perfect Platform of a Hop-garden, and necessary instructions for the making and maintenance thereof, with Notes and Rules for Reformation of all Abuses. The work, which is dedicated to Serjeant William Lovelace of Bethersden in Kent, is the first practical treatise on hop culture in England; the processes are illustrated by woodcuts. Scot, according to a statement of the printer, was out of London while the work was going through the press. A second edition appeared in 1576, and a third in 1578.

=== About witchcraft and magic ===
His work on witchcraft was The Discoverie of Witchcraft, wherein the Lewde dealing of Witches and Witchmongers is notablie detected, in sixteen books … whereunto is added a Treatise upon the Nature and Substance of Spirits and Devils, 1584. Scot enumerates 212 authors whose works in Latin he had consulted, and twenty-three authors who wrote in English. He studied the superstitions respecting witchcraft in courts of law in country districts, where the prosecution of witches was constant, and in village life, where the belief in witchcraft flourished. He set himself to prove that the belief in witchcraft and magic was rejected alike by reason and religion, and that spiritualistic manifestations were either wilful impostures or illusions due to mental disturbance in the observers. The book also includes several chapters describing conjuring and sleight of hand tricks in detail.

== Notes ==
Parliament of England
Preceded by William Southland; Robert Thurbarne	Member of Parliament for New Romney; 1589; With: William Southland	Succeeded by John Mynge; Robert Bawle
