= Thomas Scott (died 1594) =

English Member of Parliament, died 1594

The Honourable Sir Thomas Scott JP DL
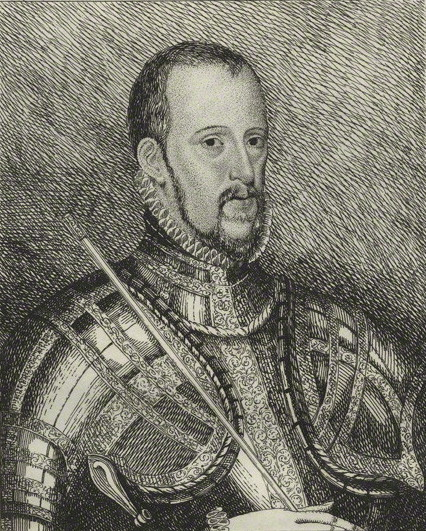
- Sir Thomas Scott, 1803, etching by Samuel de Wilde
- Born: 1535
- Died: 30 December 1594 (aged 59)
- Resting place: St Mary the Virgin's church, Brabourne; 51.1357°N 1.00549°E
- Education: Inner Temple
- Occupation: Politician
- Spouses: Elizabeth Baker (m. 1554; died 1583) Elizabeth Heyman (m. 1583, died): Dorothy Bere
- Children: with Elizabeth Baker: Thomas Scott; Sir John Scott; Charles Scott; Richard Scott; Sir Edward Scott; Robert Scott; Reginald Scott; Sir William Scott; Joseph Scott; Anthony Scott; Benjamin Scott; Elizabeth Scott; Emmeline Scott; Anne Scott; Mary Scott
- Parents: Sir Reginald Scott; Emmeline Kempe
- Relatives: Reginald Scot (cousin)
- Family: Scott

Sir Thomas Scott (1535 – 30 December 1594), of Scot's Hall, Smeeth, Kent, was an English landowner and politician who sat in the House of Commons from 1571 to 1587. He was elected MP for the seat of Kent in 1571, 1572 and 1586. He was knighted in 1570, and was cousin to Reginald Scot.

== Early life and family ==
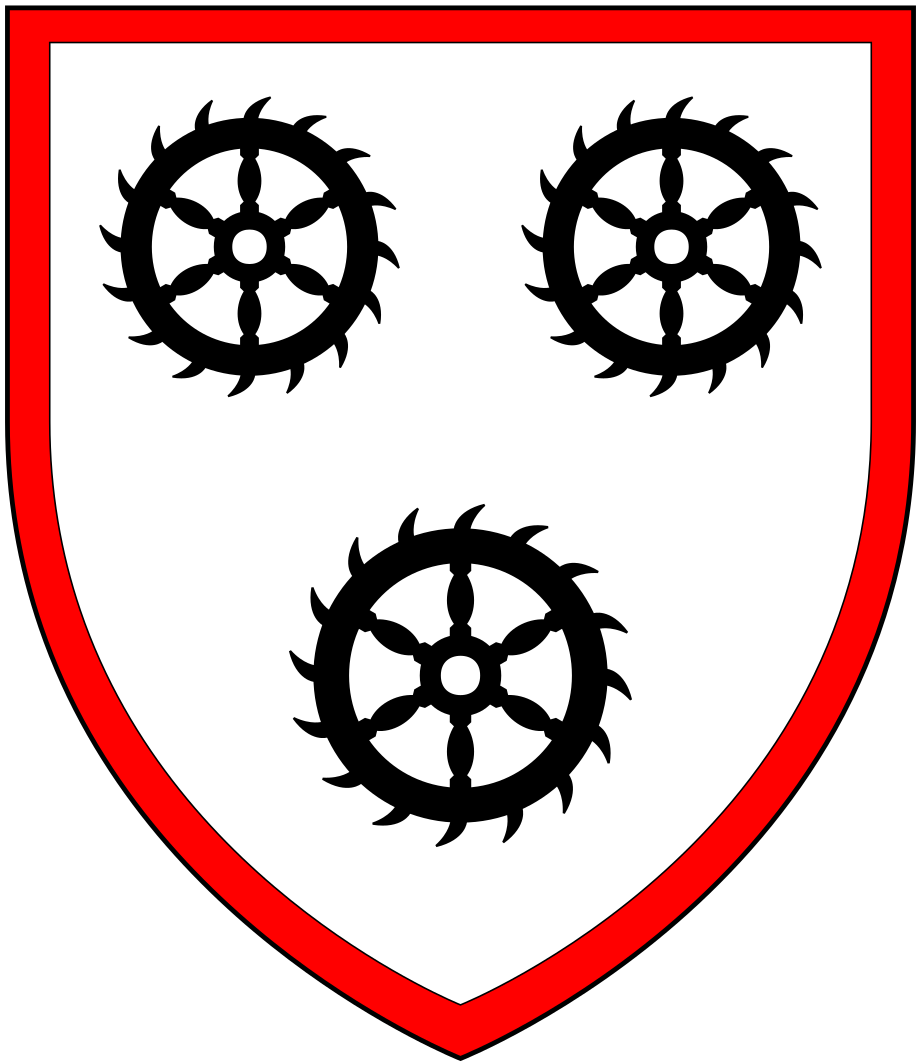
Arms of Scott: Argent, three Catherine Wheels sable a bordure gules

Thomas Scott was the eldest son of Sir Reginald Scott (d. 1554), a member of one of the leading families in Kent, by his first wife, Emmeline Kempe, the daughter of Sir William Kempe of Ollantigh and Eleanor Browne, daughter of Sir Robert Browne. He was admitted to the Inner Temple in November 1554, at the age of 19, and in the same year he was married. His father died on 16 December leaving him 30 manors centred on Brabourne and Smeeth near Ashford. On 18 May 1556, after coming of age, he was granted licence to enter his lands.

=== Marriages and issue ===
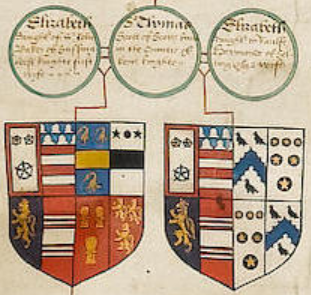
Arms of Sir Thomas Scott (1535-1594) from a family pedigree illuminated on vellum, commissioned by his second son Sir John Scott (1570-1616). The two shields show his quartered arms impaling the quartered arms of each of his two wives: left: his first wife Elizabeth Baker; right: his second wife Elizabeth Heyman

Scott married, firstly, in 1554, Elizabeth Baker (d. 1583), the daughter of Sir John Baker of Sissinghurst and sister-in-law of Thomas Sackville, 1st Earl of Dorset, by whom he had 17 children, including:

- Thomas Scott (d. 1610), of Scot's Hall, 1st son.
- Sir John Scott (d. 1616) of Nettlestead, Kent, 2nd son, who married, as his second wife, Katherine Smythe, widow of Sir Rowland Hayward and daughter of Thomas Smythe, Customer of London. He was a Member of Parliament for Kent and an early investor in the Colony of Virginia.
- Charles Scott (d. 1601), 3rd son, was Captain of 150 men, under his father, at the Camp at Northbourne, in 1589 and 1590. He died in 1601, without issue.
- Richard Scott, 4th son, who married Katherine Hayward, daughter of Sir Rowland Hayward.
- Sir Edward Scott (d. 1646), of Scot's Hall, 5th son.
- Robert Scott, 6th son.
- Reginald Scott.
- Sir William Scott.
- Joseph Scott.
- Anthony Scott.
- Benjamin Scott.
- Elizabeth Scott, who married firstly John Knatchbull, and secondly, in 1589, Sir Richard Smythe (d.1628), the son of Thomas Smythe, Customer of London.
- Emmeline Scott, who married Sir Robert Edolphe.
- Anne Scott, who married firstly Richard Knatchbull, and secondly Sir Henry Bromley.
- Mary Scott, who married Sir Anthony St. Leger (d.1603), of Ulcombe and Leeds, Kent, eldest son and heir of Sir Warham St Leger by his first wife, Ursula Neville, youngest daughter of George Neville, 5th Baron Bergavenny, by whom she was the mother of Sir Warham St Leger (d. 11 October 1631), who married Mary Hayward (d.1662), daughter of Sir Rowland Hayward. After the death of Sir Anthony St. Leger in 1603, his widow, Mary Scott, married Sir Alexander Culpeper (d. 15 April 1636) of Wigsell, East Sussex.

She died on 17 November 1583 and was buried at Brabourne.

He married, secondly, in 1583, Elizabeth Heyman, the daughter of Ralph Heyman of Somerfield, by whom he had no issue.

He married, thirdly, Dorothy Bere, daughter of John Bere of Horsman's Place, Dartford, and widow of, John Heyes, of Essex, Edward Scott, of Camberwell, and George Fynche, of Norton in Sheldwich, Kent. By Dorothy he had no issue.

== Career ==
Scott quickly became prominent in public affairs, serving as a justice of the peace (JP) for Kent from about 1561, quarter sessions by 1571 and as a commissioner for piracy in 1565 and for grain by 1573.

In 1570 he was knighted at Somerset Place in London. He was Sheriff of Kent from 1576 to 1577, deputy lieutenant by 1582; commissioner for piracy and Cinque Ports, Sussex, in 1578.

He served as MP for the seat of Kent in the parliaments of 1571, 1572–1583 and 1586–1587. In 1589, he probably helped his cousin, Reginald Scot, acquire the seat of New Romney. He was also a commissioner for draining and improving Romney Marsh, and was superintendent of works for the improvement of Dover harbour in the 1580s.

In Parliament, Scott seems to have been a consistent scourge of the Roman Catholics. In his first Parliament, he was appointed to a joint committee with the House of Lords to confer with the Royal lawyers on how to deal with Mary, Queen of Scots. On 15 May 1572, in the debate following the committee's report to the Commons, he regaled the House with his conclusion, that the Scots Queen was not the root of the mischief: "Rather, as a good physician before prescribing medicine, he would seek out the causes. Papistry was the principal." The second cause was the uncertainty of the succession, and the medicine he prescribed was threefold - taking away Mary's title to the succession, establishing an alternative heir and, as these two alone would be insufficient, cutting off the heads of the Scots Queen and the Duke of Alva. Scott's drastic advice was echoed by many others in the debate, but was not adopted by the government.

In February 1587, Scott was warning Parliament of the danger from Spain. (His second son, John, was serving with the army in the Netherlands, and was soon to win a knighthood for his services.) He told the Commons that in his view there was "more danger by advancing Papists into place of trust and government than by anything", advice which no doubt went down well with the mood of the day, but also considered the dangers of invasion, drawing from the resistance to Julius Caesar the lesson that the enemy should be countered at sea or fought while landing on the beaches. His attack on the Catholics caught the imagination of the Puritan members, and he was forthwith appointed to the head of a small committee "to search certain houses in Westminster suspected of receiving and harbouring of Jesuits, seminaries or of seditious and Popish books and trumperies of superstition." But he did not neglect his own advice on more practical military defences: at the time of the Spanish Armada the following year, he was appointed head of the defensive force assembled at Northbourne Downs to meet any invasion in Kent, and equipped four thousand men at his own expense within a day of receiving his orders.

== Death ==
He died on 30 December 1594, at the age of 59, according to his epitaph, attributed to his cousin, Reginald Scot. His will dated 17 December 1594 (proved on 7 January 1595), left the bulk of his estate, including the Scot's Hall estate and all his goods to his eldest son, Thomas. His second son, John received £150 and his mother's "jewel of diamonds and rubies", for his wife, Lady Elizabeth. His younger sons, Charles, Richard, Edward and Robert, were each given minor land holdings while three sons-in-law, Sir Henry Bromley, Sir Anthony St. Leger and Richard Smythe each received a horse or a gelding. He left part of his household goods and several portions of lands, including the manor of Thevegate, to his widow, who had to surrender her jointure, Nettlestead, to the second son, John. The will had a codicil: "That my executers shall finish the buildings which I have begun at Thevegate, in such sort as I meant to have done, so as the rooms which are to be made mete for Dame Dorothy, my wife, to inhabit in may speedily according to the plot and purpose which I went to accomplish be performed and done." Thevegate (or Evegate) where his widow was to reside, came into the Scott family on the marriage of Anne Pympe, daughter and heir of Reynold Pympe (d. 1531) to Sir John Scott (d. 1533) of Scot's Hall in 1506.

Scott was held in such high regard that after his death in 1594, the parish of Ashford offered to bury him in the chancel of the parish church free of charge, although his heirs declined the offer and he was buried with his ancestors in the parish church at Brabourne.

AN EPYTAPHE uppon the death of the noble and famous Sir Thomas Scott, of Scotshall in the countie of Kente, who dyed on the 30th day of December, 1594, and was buried in Brabourne Church among his ancestours: —

Here lyes Sir Thomas Scott by name;
Oh happie Kempe that bore him!
Sir Raynold, with four knights of fame, Lyv'd lyneally before him.
His wieves were Baker, Heyman, Beere;
His love to them unfayned.
He lyved nyne and fiftie yeare, And seventeen soules he gayned.
His first wief bore them every one;
The world might not have myst her!
She was a very paragon.
The Lady Buckherst's syster....

— Reginald Scot, Epitaph for Sir Thomas Scott

Sir Thomas Scott's monument in Brabourne church was destroyed by the Parliamentarian forces during the civil war in 1648. No trace of it remains in the church, but in what was formerly the chapel of Scot’s Hall, a mural slab was found in the nineteenth century, bearing the words: "Here lies all that is mortal of Sir Thomas Scott".

== Notes ==
Parliament of England
Preceded by Sir Henry Sidney; Henry Cheyne	Member of Parliament for Kent; 1571–1583; With: Sir Henry Sidney 1571; Sir Henry Sidney 1572–1583	Succeeded by Sir Philip Sidney; Edward Wotton
Preceded by Sir Philip Sidney; Edward Wotton	Member of Parliament for Kent; 1586–1587; With: Sir Henry Brooke alias Cobham I 1586–1587	Succeeded by Henry Brooke alias Cobham II; Sir Henry Brooke alias Cobham I
