= Leonard Digges (scientist) =

English mathematician and surveyor

- Born: c.1515
- Died: c.1559, aged 44
- Parent(s): James Digges, Philippe Engham

Leonard Digges (c.1515 – c.1559) was a English mathematician and surveyor, credited with the invention of the theodolite, and a great populariser of science through his writings in English on surveying, cartography, and military engineering. His birth date is variously suggested as c.1515 or c.1520 (but certainly by 1530).

Much of his work was expanded on, annotated, and published by his son, Thomas Digges. His son followed in his footsteps and was a pivotal player in the popularisation of Copernicus's book De revolutionibus orbium coelestium. Notes written by Thomas Digges in the publication of the book Pantometria in 1570 contain descriptions of how Leonard Digges made use of a "proportional Glass" to view distant objects and people. Some, such as astronomer and historian Colin Ronan, claim this describes a reflecting or refracting telescope built between 1540 and 1559, but its vague description and claimed performance makes it dubious.

== Biography ==
Leonard Digges, born about 1515, was the only son of James Digges (born c.1473), esquire, of Digges Court and Broome in Barham, Kent, by his second wife, Philippe Engham, the daughter of John Engham, esquire, of Chart, Kent. James Digges had been High Sheriff of Kent in 1510–11, and had married as his first wife Mildred Fineux, the daughter of Sir John Fineux, Chief Justice of the King's Bench, and Elizabeth Apuldrefield, by whom he had an only son, John Digges, who married Mildred Scott, the daughter of Sir John Scott (d. 7 October 1533) of Scot's Hall in Smeeth, Kent. John Digges predeceased his father, leaving two sons by his wife, Mildred Scott, William Digges and Francis Digges. James Digges made his last will on 20 February 1535/6 requesting burial in the north chancel of the church of Barham, 'where my mother and my wife do lie', and naming as executors his second wife, Philippe; John Sackville, esquire; his nephew, Robert Brent, gentleman; and his son, Leonard, with Sir William Hawte as overseer. The will was proved on 24 November 1540, at which time his second wife, Philippe, was still living.

Leonard Digges was the grandson of John Digges, esquire, of Digges Court and Broome, High Sheriff of Kent in 1495-6, and his wife Joan Clifton, the daughter and co-heiress of Sir Gervase Clifton of Clifton, Nottinghamshire, London, and Brabourne, Kent, by his first wife, Isabel Herbert, daughter of Vincent Herbert, esquire. Leonard Digges' aunt, Isabel Digges, the daughter of John Digges and Joan Clifton, married Richard Sackville (d. 28 July 1524), esquire, and was the mother of John Sackville.

In 1542 Digges, in company with three other gentlemen, visited the castle of Guînes, 'where they impressed their host through debate and demonstration of their skills in geometry, navigation, measurement, and artillery'.

In January 1554 Digges took part in an unsuccessful rebellion led by the Protestant Sir Thomas Wyatt, who opposed the projected marriage between Philip II of Spain and England's new Catholic Queen, Mary I. Digges was convicted of high treason, attainted, and condemned to death. His life was pardoned on 1 April 1554, but according to Johnston 'his lands and goods, which had been seized after his attainder, continued to be held subject to payment of recognizances to the crown'. In February 1555 Digges was fined 400 marks. After being paid off in instalments, the fine was discharged on 7 May 1558. The date of Digges' death is unknown; he is thought to have died about 1559:

From Thomas's autobiographical comments in a legal dispute of the 1590s it can be inferred that Leonard died about 1559, shortly after he had resumed possession of his confiscated lands.

=== Marriage and issue ===
Digges married Bridget Wilford, the daughter of Thomas Wilford, esquire, of Hartridge in Cranbrook, Kent, by his first wife, Elizabeth Culpeper, the daughter of Walter Culpeper, esquire, by whom he had three sons and three daughters:

- Thomas Digges, whose children were Sir Dudley Digges (politician and statesman) (1583–1639), Leonard Digges (writer) (1588–1635), Margaret and Ursula
- James Digges.
- Daniel Digges.
- Mary Digges, who married a husband surnamed Barber.
- Anne Digges, who married William Digges.
- Sarah Digges, who married firstly a husband surnamed Martin, and secondly John Weston.

== Works ==
The first publication of many by Leonard Digges was A General Prognostication published in 1553, which became a best-seller as it contained a perpetual calendar, collections of weather lore and a wealth of astronomical material, until then largely only obtainable through books published in Latin or Greek. It was revised in 1555 (the earliest surviving edition) and again in 1556 with the title A Prognostication everlasting. Subsequent editions reprint the text from 1556; editions from 1576 and later include additional material by his son.

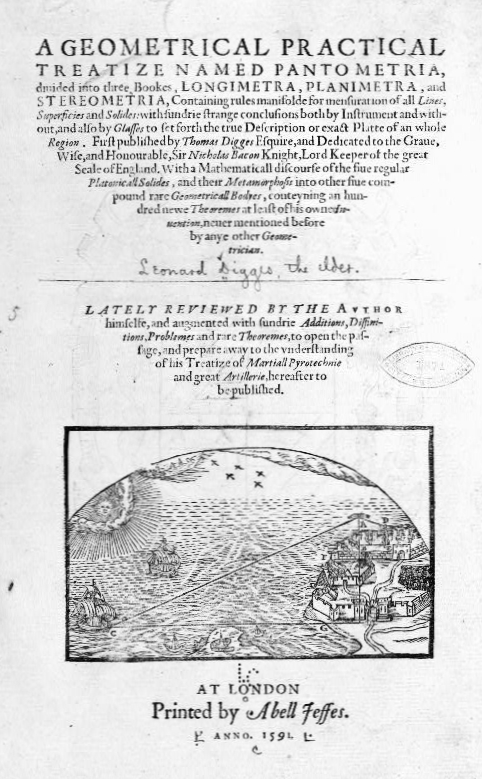
Title page of Leonard Digges's Pantometria (1591)

=== Telescope ===
There are claims Leonard Digges independently invented the reflecting telescope, and/or the refracting telescope as part of his need to see accurately over long distances during his surveying works. In the preface to the 1591 Pantometria, (a book on measurement, partially based on his father's notes and observations) Leonard's son Thomas lauded his father's accomplishments. Some of the praise of the son for the father appears to be extravagant exaggeration, while other claims appear more credible. On the fifth page of the preface, Thomas Digges provides a remarkable account of his father's accomplishments:

[H]is divine mind aided with this science of Geometrical mensurations, found out the quantities, distances, courses, and strange intricate miraculous motions of these resplendent heavenly Globes of Sun, Moon, Planets and Stares fixed, leaving the rules and precepts thereof to his posterity. Archimedes also (as some suppose) with a glass framed by revolution of a section Parabolicall, fired the Roman navy in the sea coming to the siege of Syracuse. But to leave these celestial causes and things done of antiquity long ago, my father by his continual painful [painstaking] practices, assisted with demonstrations Mathematical, was able, and sundry times hath by proportional Glasses duly situate in convenient angles, not only discovered things far off, read letters, numbered pieces of money with the very coin and superscription thereof, cast by some of his friends of purpose upon downs in open fields, but also seven miles off declared what hath been done at that instant in private places.

The writings left by Digges' colleague William Bourne contain further detail on the experiments with lenses and mirrors conducted by Leonard Digges and his son. It is these details which led some researchers, most notably Colin Ronan, to claim that Leonard Digges invented a functioning telescope sometime between 1540 and 1559. The description seemed to suggest that Digges created a rudimentary instrument incorporating lenses and a concave mirror, in a manner rather different from a modern reflecting telescope. However, the construction of lenses to the required optical precision would have been very difficult in the 16th century, and the construction of an adequate mirror would have been much harder still. It is doubtful that Digges built a successful instrument, and the optical performance required to see the details of coins lying about in fields, or private activities seven miles away was far beyond the technology of the time.

== Honours ==
Digges Cove in Antarctica is named after Leonard Digges.
