= John Scott (died 1533) =

English politician (died 1533)

Sir John Scott
- Born: c. 1484
- Died: 7 October 1533
- Occupation: Member of Parliament for New Romney
- Spouse: Anne Pympe
- Parents: Sir William Scott (father); Sibyl Lewknor (mother)

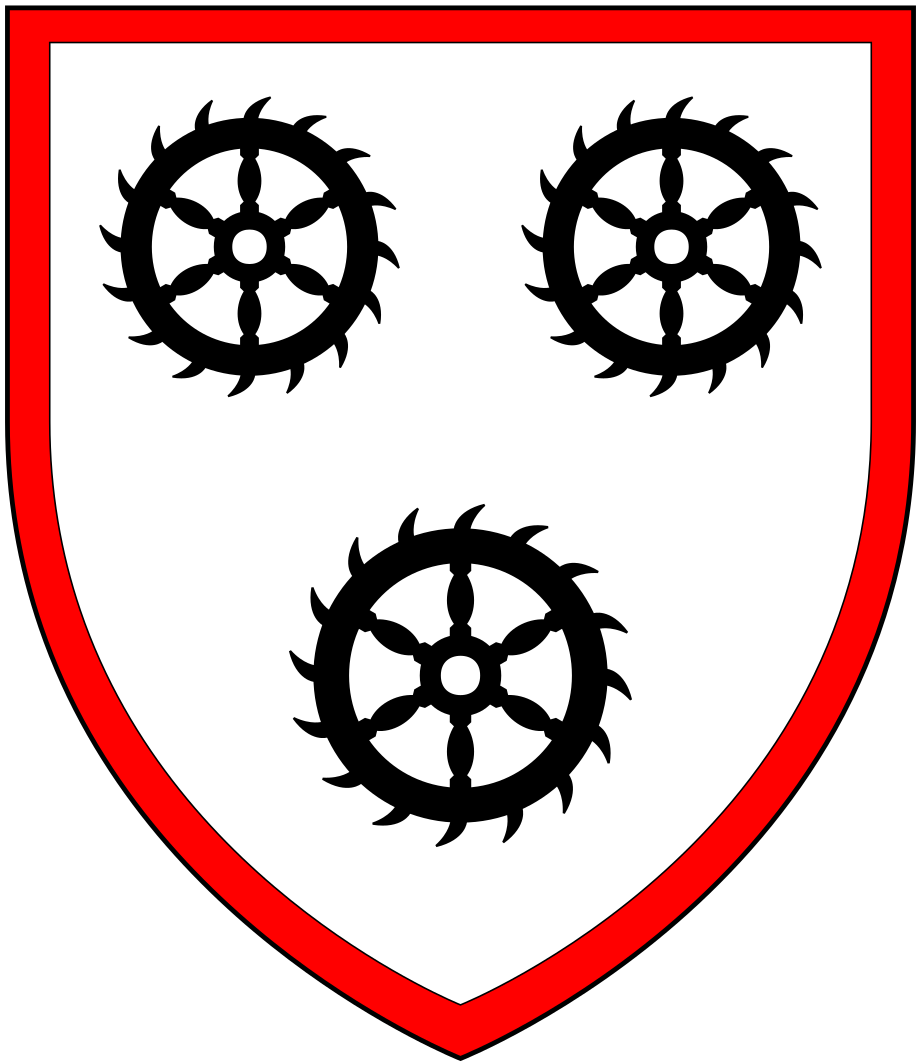
Arms of Scott: Argent, three Catherine Wheels sable a bordure gules

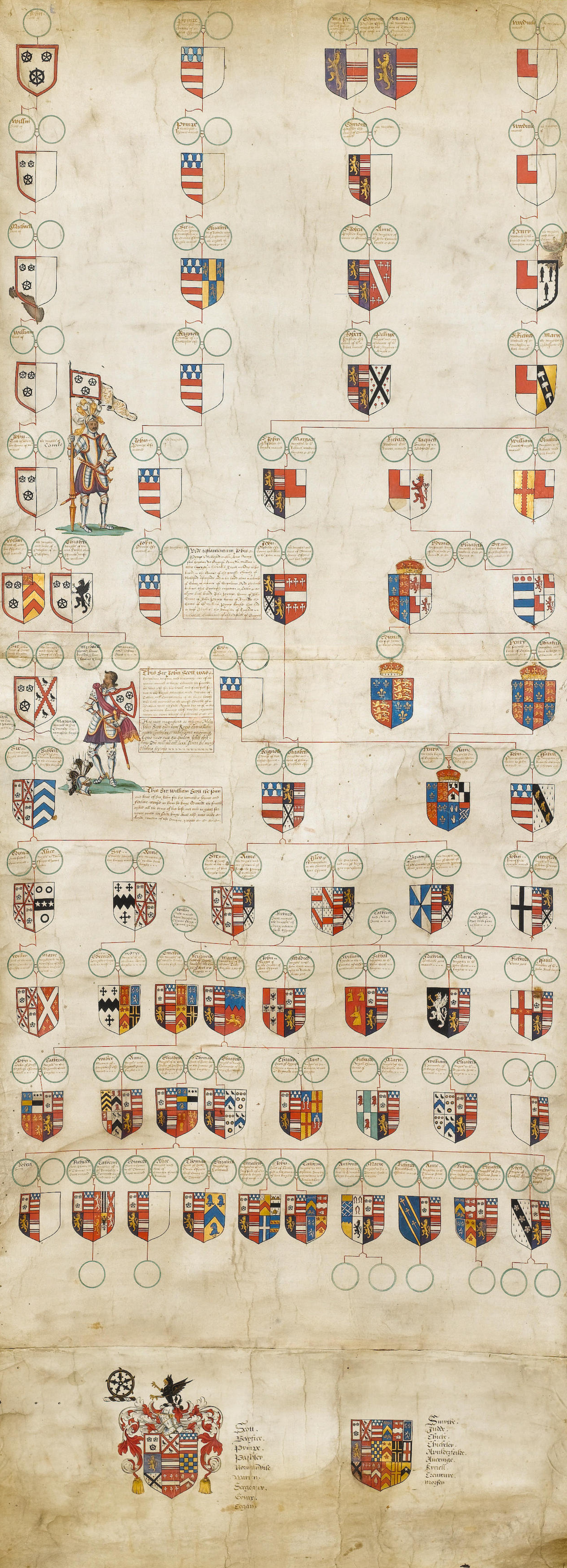
Scott family pedigree commissioned by Sir John Scott(1570–1616), of Scot's Hall and of Nettlestead Place in Kent, great-grandson of Sir John Scott (d.1533), showing the family's connection to Elizabeth Woodville, wife of King Edward IV. His shield is 4th row from the bottom, 3rd from the left, showing the quartered arms of Scott impaling the quartered arms of Pympe

Sir John Scott (c. 1484 – 7 October 1533) was the eldest son of Sir William Scott of Scot's Hall. He served in King Henry VIII's campaigns in France and was active in local government in Kent and a Member of Parliament for New Romney. He was the grandfather of both Reginald Scott, author of The Discoverie of Witchcraft, a source for Shakespeare's Macbeth, and Thomas Keyes, who married Lady Mary Grey.

== Family ==
According to MacMahon, the Scott family, which claimed descent from John Balliol, was among the leading families in Kent during the reign of King Henry VII.

John Scott, born about 1484, was the eldest son of Sir William Scott of Scot's Hall and Sibyl Lewknor (d. 1529), the daughter of Sir Thomas Lewknor of Trotton, Sussex. Scott's father, Sir William Scott, had been Comptroller of the Household to King Henry VII, and Scott's grandfather, Sir John Scott, had been Comptroller of the Household to King Edward IV. Both Scott's father and grandfather had held the offices of Constable of Dover Castle and Warden of the Cinque Ports, and Scott's father had been Marshal of Calais.

Scott had a brother, Edward, and three sisters, Anne, who married Sir Edward Boughton; Katherine; and Elizabeth.

== Career ==
As a young man Scott was knighted by the future Emperor Charles V in 1511 while serving as a senior captain, under his relative Sir Edward Poynings, with the English forces sent by King Henry VIII to aid Margaret of Austria, Regent of the Low Countries, against Charles II, Duke of Guelders. According to MacMahon Henry VIII 'transmuted the honour into a knighthood of the body'. In 1512 he was elected Member of Parliament for New Romney. Scott may have participated in the French campaigns of 1512 and 1513; he was among the forces being marshaled at Calais in 1514 when negotiations for peace between England and France brought the war to a temporary halt. In 1514 and 1515 he was a commissioner for the subsidy in Sussex. In June 1520 he attended Henry VIII at the Field of Cloth of Gold. In 1522 he was in the service of George Nevill, 5th Baron Bergavenny, Constable of Dover Castle, and was placed in charge of transport when the Emperor Charles V landed at Dover on 28 May 1522. In 1523 Scott was with the English forces which invaded northern France under the Duke of Suffolk. In 1523 and 1524 he was a commissioner for the subsidy in Kent. He was Sheriff of Kent in 1527 and 1528, and a Justice of the Peace in that county from 1531 until his death. In May 1533 Scott was summoned to be a servitor at the coronation of Anne Boleyn. He died on 7 October 1533.

== Marriage and issue ==
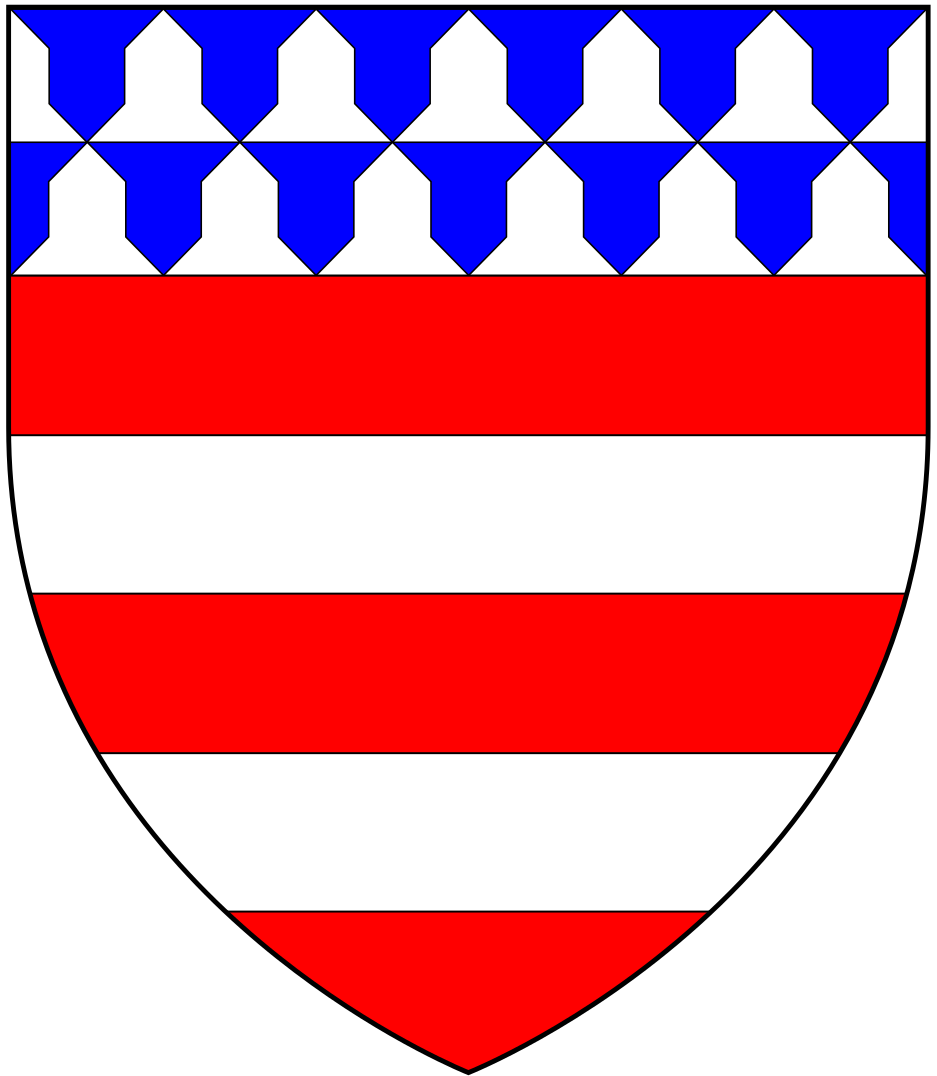
Arms of Pympe: Gules, two bars argent a chief vair

Scott married, before 22 November 1506, Anne Pympe, daughter and heiress of Reynold Pympe, esquire, of Nettlestead, Kent, by Elizabeth Pashley, the daughter of John Pashley, esquire.

Sir John Scott and Anne Pympe had five sons and seven daughters:

- William Scott, who died in 1536 without issue.
- Sir Reginald (or Reynold) Scott (1512–15 December 1554), Sheriff of Kent in 1541–42 and Captain of Calais and Sandgate, who married firstly Emeline Kempe, the daughter of Sir William Kempe of Olantigh, Kent, by Eleanor Browne, the daughter of Sir Robert Browne, by whom he was the father of Sir Thomas Scott (1535–30 December 1594) and two daughters, Katherine Scott, who married John Baker (c.1531–1604×6), by whom she was the mother of Richard Baker, and Anne Scott, who married Walter Mayney. Sir Reginald Scott married secondly Mary Tuke, the daughter of Sir Brian Tuke.
- Sir John Scott.
- Richard Scott, esquire, the father of Reginald Scott (d. 1599), author of The Discoverie of Witchcraft.
- George Scott.
- Mildred Scott, who married firstly, John Digges, esquire, the son of James Digges and half brother of Leonard Digges, and secondly, Richard Keyes, gentleman, by whom she was the mother of Thomas Keyes, who married Lady Mary Grey.
- Katherine Scott, who married Sir Henry Crispe.
- Isabel Scott, who married Richard Adams, esquire.
- Alice Scott.
- Mary Scott, who married Nicholas Ballard, gentleman.
- Elizabeth Scott.
- Sibyl Scott, who married Richard Hynde, esquire.
