= Scot's Hall =

Country house in Smeeth, England

Coordinates: 51°6′50″N 0°58′11″E

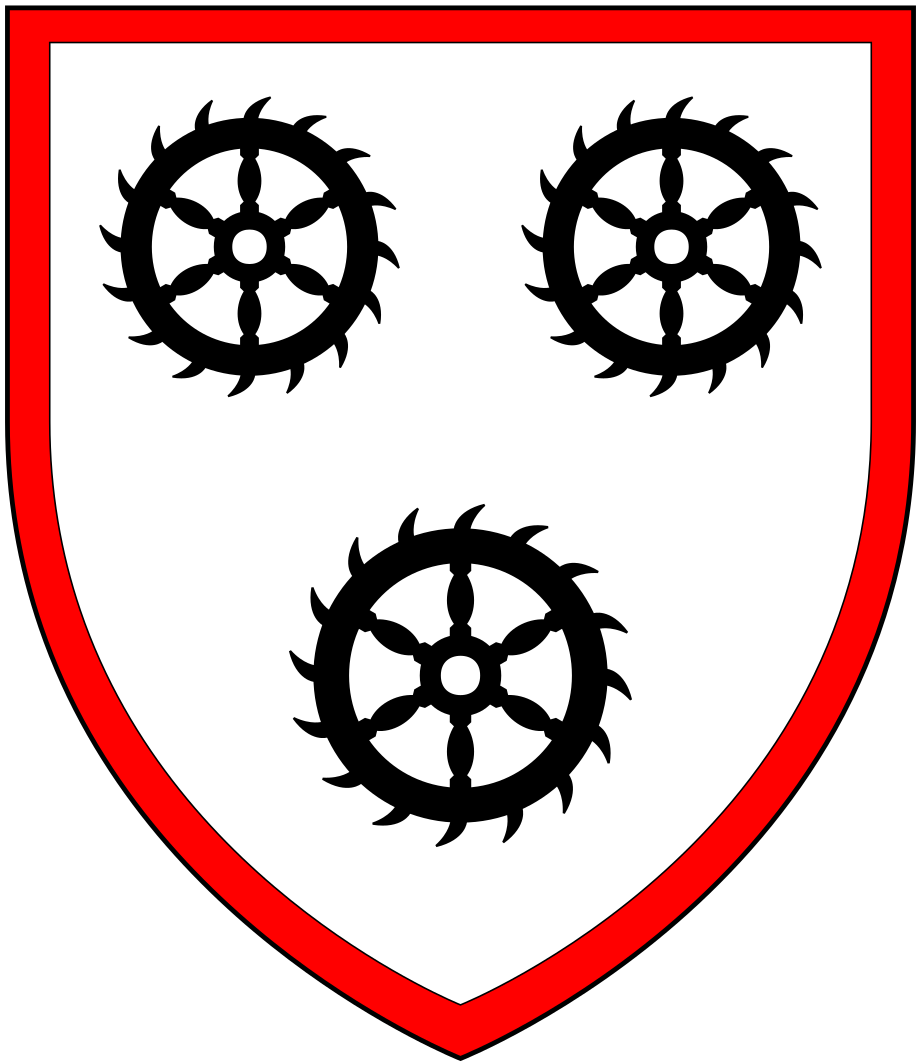
Arms of Scott of Scot's Hall: Argent, three Catherine Wheels sable a bordure gules

Scot's Hall (or Scott's Hall) was a country house in Smeeth, between Ashford and Folkestone in southeast England. It was the property of a gentry family, the Scotts.

From the beginning of the fourteenth century to the end of the eighteenth century, the Scotts, who were descendants of the Balliols, were influential in Kent, also owning Chilham Castle. Scott's Hall was the centre of the dynasty and there was a time when one could ride from Scot's Hall to London without leaving Scott Property, a journey of over fifty miles. During the reign of Elizabeth I, it was described as one of the most splendid houses in Kent. Samuel Pepys was a regular visitor in the seventeenth century: the contemporary owner, Sir Thomas Scott, married Caroline Carteret, daughter of Pepys' friend and colleague, Sir George Carteret. With his keen nose for gossip, Pepys noted that Thomas' right to inherit the estate was debatable: his parents were separated, and his father for a time refused to acknowledge any of his wife's children, although he ultimately did acknowledge Thomas as his son.

== History of the Buildings ==
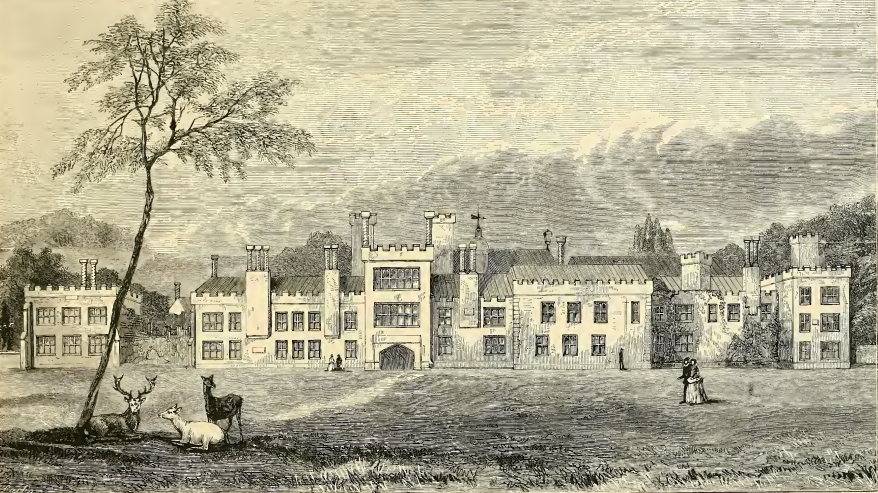
Scot's Hall, rebuilt circa 1491

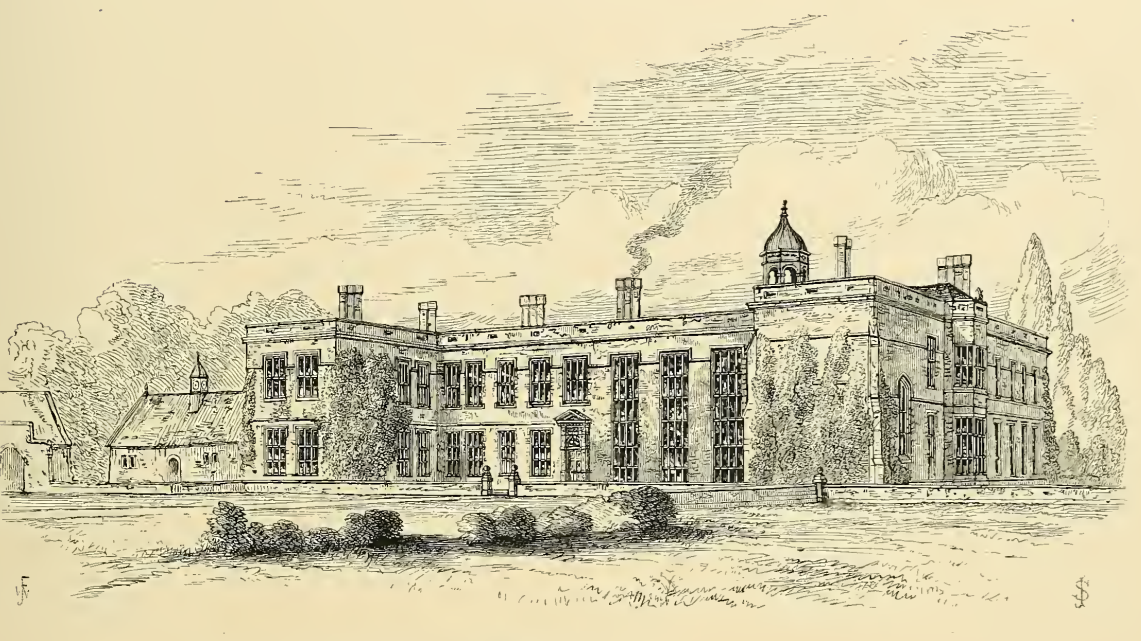
Scot's Hall, rebuilt circa 1634

Scott's Hall at its current location is one of the oldest houses in Smeeth and has a long and fascinating history. It is not possible to say exactly when the first Scott's Hall at this location was built but there is certainly evidence to suggest that it replaced an old medieval house and was here in 1429 when the Scot family moved into it from the nearby village of Braborne (sic). At some point it must have been destroyed by fire because a second Scot's Hall was re-built in 1491. James Renat Scott, in his book "Memorials of the family of Scott, of Scot's-hall, In the county of Kent" published in 1876, surmises that this must have been one of the most magnificent manorial residences in the county. A map dated 1590, currently on show in the Tower of London, demonstrates the position of Scott's Hall and its gardens over a large area centred on the current location. There is also a map in Ashford Museum which shows the hall, with the legend "Scots Hall, Mrs Scot". However, a third fire resulted in its destruction once more which necessitated yet another Scot's Hall being re-built in 1634. A drawing of the house shown in Renat's book illustrates a huge dwelling with many rooms and large grounds. Records from the reign of Queen Elizabeth I describe Scots Hall as one of the most splendid houses in Kent and Samuel Pepys was apparently a regular visitor to Scots Hall during the C17th. It was claimed that it was possible to ride a horse all the way to London from Scots Hall (over 50 miles) without once leaving grounds which were owned by the wealthy Scot family.

Towards the end of the C18th the financial fortunes of the Scot family began to decline and it had to be sold to Sir John Honeywell in 1784. The new owner also struggled with the upkeep and the enormous house fell into disrepair. In 1808 the once magnificent building was finally taken down due to decay and now little remains of the original building except the site, the name and a few other hidden secrets. There is evidence of the old stone walls in at least three places around the gardens of the current Scott's Hall, which indicate the sheer size of the former building. The current Scott's Hall, which was rebuilt in the early C19th, is very much smaller than the original but one wall on the east of the house appears to be from an earlier building as the Jacobean bricks have been left in situ and align perfectly with another ancient wall further up the garden. There is also an old well in the garden with pipes leading up to the house which still holds water. At some point the lath and plaster in the entrance hall of the house was removed, uncovered beams which have been dated to the C14th, though it is possible that they were originally ships' beams that have been repurposed. There is also Jacobean panelling in the main hall of the house.

The ancient Scot family themselves claimed to be the descendants of the Norman family of Balliol and through them the kings of Scotland from Malcolm were descended. William Scot was the brother of the King of Scotland and for a time the family wrote their surname as de Balliol de Scot. Diplomatically, William later dropped the de Balliol part of his name in order to avoid the anger of King Edward of England, retaining only that of Scot. It is recorded that John de Balliol was born at Durham in 1208 but, following a land dispute with the Bishop of Durham which he lost, he agreed to pay penance by providing funds for schools in Oxford. After his death, his wife established Balliol college in Oxford. One of his grandsons, John le Scot, married Caroline Carter and thereafter moved to Kent and eventually Scott's Hall. For nearly four hundred years the Scot family held considerable influence over Kent and had positions at court according to their rank. John le Scot was a committed supporter of the House of York and, along with many of his descendants, is buried at St Mary's Church in Brabourne where they had originally briefly settled when they first came to Kent.

Little evidence remains of how well the Scot family got on together, except amongst the Deeds four letters were found dated 26 February, 13 March, 16 April, and July 1779. These are all from a Cecilia Scot who was married to Francis Scot, who were the last Scots to reside at Scott's Hall. The letters are addressed to her uncle William (1713-1803) who was said to be quite a wealthy man, begging his help to leave an unhappy marriage and escape from a man she clearly didn't love; sadly no help seems to have come from him so Cecilia had to remain with her husband.

== Descent ==
=== William Scott (d.1434) ===
William Scott (d.1434) married Isabel Finch (died c.1457), youngest daughter of Vincent Finch (alias Herbert), of Netherfield, Sussex. His son and heir was John Scott (c.1423-1485) of Scot's Hall. His daughter Joan Scott married Thomas Yerde of Denton Court and the manor of Tappington in Kent and East Cheam in Surrey. Thomas Yerde’s mother was Anne Courtenay daughter of Hugh Courtenay, 4th Earl of Devonshire.

=== John Scott (c.1423-1485) ===
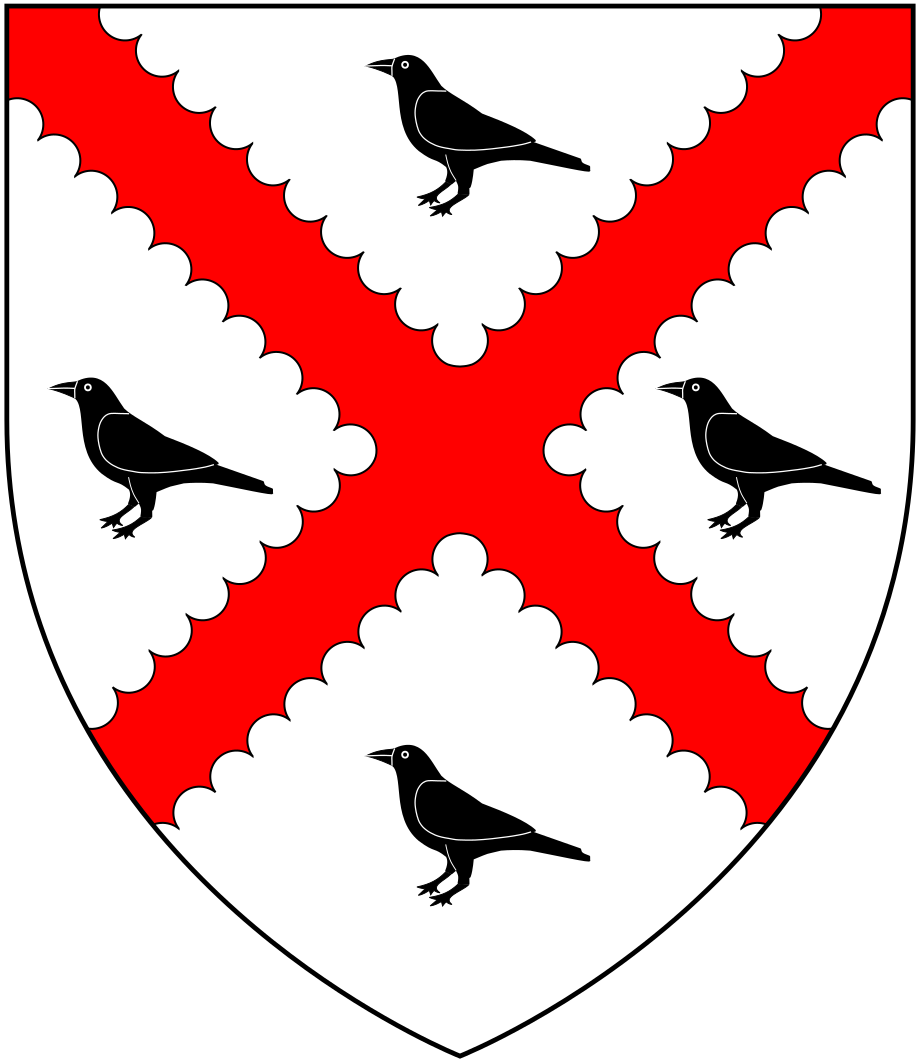
Arms of Beaufitz: Argent, a saltire engrailed gules between four ravens proper

John Scott (c.1423-1485) of Scot's Hall was a committed supporter of the House of York. Among other offices, he served as Comptroller of the Household to Edward IV, and lieutenant to the Lord Warden of the Cinque Ports. He was the son of William Scott (d.1434) and Isabel Finch (died c.1457), youngest daughter of Vincent Finch, or Herbert, of Netherfield, Sussex. He married Agnes Beaufitz (d.1486/7), daughter and co-heiress of William Beaufitz (alias Bewfice) of The Grange, Gillingham, Kent, and likely also a fishmonger of London, by whom he had a son and two daughters including:

- Sir William Scott (d. 24 August 1524), who married Sibyl Lewknor.
- Isabel or Elizabeth Scott (d. 15 August 1528), whom Sir John Scott married to his ward, Sir Edward Poynings. There is a memorial brass to her in St Mary's Church, Brabourne.
  He died 17 October 1485, and was buried, by his instructions, in the north wall of the chancel of St. Mary's church, Brabourne.

=== William Scott (1459-1524) ===
Arms of Lewknor: Azure, three chevrons argent

Sir William Scott (1459-1524) of Scot's Hall in Smeeth, Kent was Lord Warden of the Cinque Ports. He was the son of Sir John Scott and Agnes Beaufitz, daughter and co-heiress of William Beaufitz. He married Sibyl Lewknor, the daughter of Sir Thomas Lewknor (d.1484) of Trotton, Sussex, and Katherine Pelham (d.1481), widow of John Bramshott (d.1468), and daughter of Sir John Pelham, Chamberlain to Queen Catherine of Valois. His son and heir was Sir John Scott (d.1533), who married Anne Pympe. He was buried at Brabourne, where there is a memorial brass to him in the Scott chapel in St Mary's church.

=== Sir John Scott (c. 1484-1533) ===
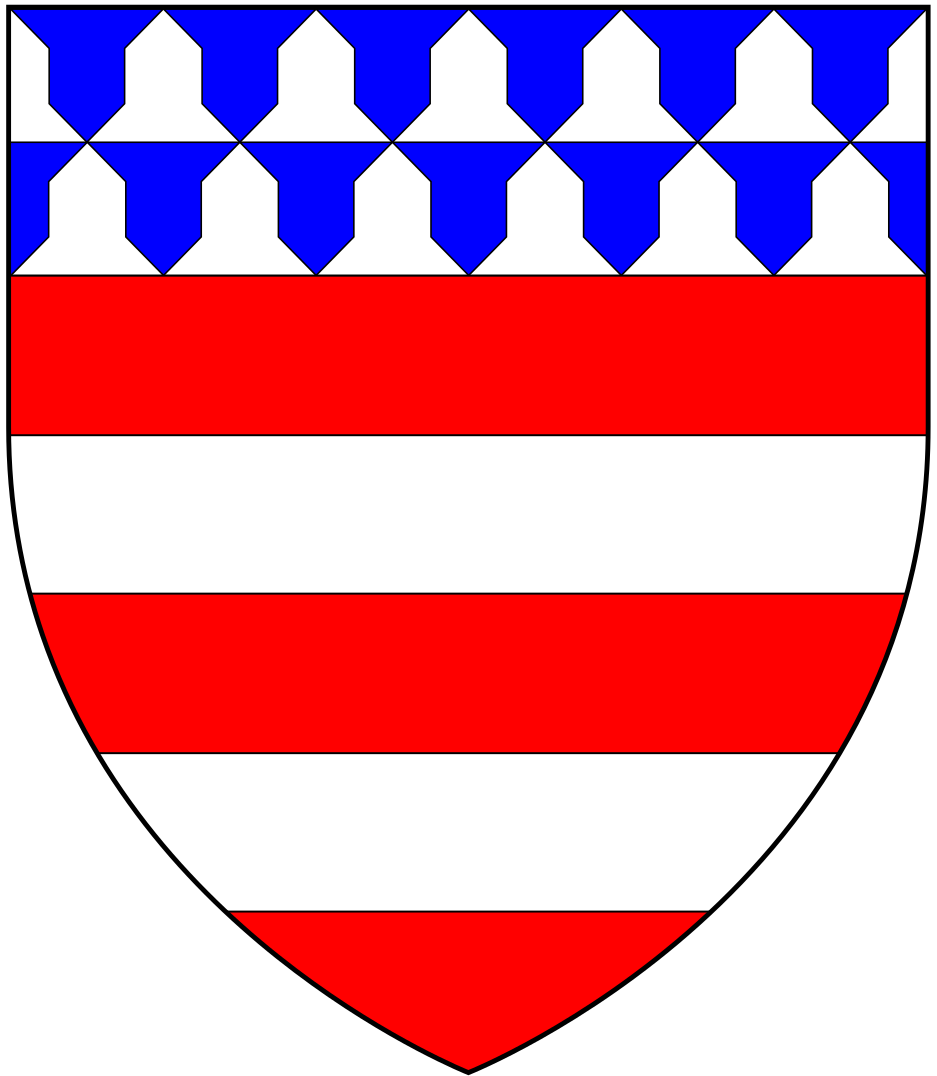
Arms of Pympe: Gules, two bars argent a chief vair

Sir John Scott (c. 1484 – 7 October 1533) was the eldest son of Sir William Scott of Scot's Hall. He served in King Henry VIII's campaigns in France, and was active in local government in Kent and Burgess of New Romney. He was the grandfather of both Reginald Scot, author of The Discoverie of Witchcraft, a source for Shakespeare's Macbeth, and Thomas Keyes, who married Lady Mary Grey. He married, before 22 November 1506, Anne Pympe, daughter and heiress of Reynold Pympe, esquire, of Nettlestead, Kent, by Elizabeth Pashley, the daughter of John Pashley, esquire. Sir John Scott and Anne Pympe had five sons and seven daughters:

- William Scott, who died in 1536 without issue.
- Sir Reginald (or Reynold) Scott (1512–15 December 1554), Sheriff of Kent in 1541–42 and Captain of Calais and Sandgate, who married firstly Emeline Kempe, the daughter of Sir William Kempe of Olantigh, Kent, by Eleanor Browne, the daughter of Sir Robert Browne, by whom he was the father of Sir Thomas Scott (1535–30 December 1594) and two daughters, Katherine Scott, who married John Baker (c.1531–1604×6), by whom she was the mother of Richard Baker, and Anne Scott, who married Walter Mayney. Sir Reginald Scott married secondly Mary Tuke, the daughter of Sir Brian Tuke.
- Sir John Scott.
- Richard Scott, esquire, the father of Reginald Scot (d. 1599), author of The Discoverie of Witchcraft.
- George Scott.
- Mildred Scott, who married firstly, John Digges, esquire, the son of James Digges and half brother of Leonard Digges, and secondly, Richard Keyes, gentleman, by whom she was the mother of Thomas Keyes, who married Lady Mary Grey.
- Katherine Scott, who married Sir Henry Crispe.
- Isabel Scott, who married Richard Adams, esquire.
- Alice Scott.
- Mary Scott, who married Nicholas Ballard, gentleman.
- Elizabeth Scott.
- Sibyl Scott, who married Richard Hynde, esquire.

=== Sir Reginald Scott (1512–1554) ===
Sir Reginald (or Reynold) Scott (1512–15 December 1554), Sheriff of Kent in 1541–42 and Captain of Calais and Sangatte, who married firstly Emeline Kempe, the daughter of Sir William Kempe of Olantigh, Kent, by Eleanor Browne, the daughter of Sir Robert Browne, by whom he was the father of Sir Thomas Scott (1535–30 December 1594) and two daughters, Katherine Scott, who married John Baker (c.1531–1604×6), by whom she was the mother of Richard Baker, and Anne Scott, who married Walter Mayney. Sir Reginald Scott married secondly Mary Tuke, the daughter of Sir Brian Tuke.

=== Sir Thomas Scott (1535–1594) ===
Sir Thomas Scott (1535–1594), son of Sir Reginald Scott (1512–1554) of Scot's Hall in Kent, was an English Member of Parliament (MP). He married three times:

- Firstly to Elizabeth Baker (d. 17 November 1583), the daughter of Sir John Baker of Sissinghurst and sister-in-law of Thomas Sackville, 1st Earl of Dorset, by whom he had ten sons and four daughters:
  - Sir Edward Scott.
  - Thomas Scott, esquire.
  - Sir John Scott of Nettlestead, Kent, who married, as his second wife, Katherine Smythe, widow of Sir Rowland Hayward and daughter of Thomas Smythe, Customer of London. He was a Member of Parliament for Kent and an early investor in the Colony of Virginia.
  - Richard Scott, who married Katherine Hayward, daughter of Sir Rowland Hayward.
  - Robert Scott.
  - Reginald Scott.
  - Sir William Scott.
  - Joseph Scott.
  - Anthony Scott.
  - Benjamin Scott.
  - Elizabeth Scott, who married firstly John Knatchbull, and secondly, in 1589, Sir Richard Smythe (d.1628),[1] the son of Thomas Smythe, Customer of London.
  - Emeline Scott, who married Sir Robert Edolphe.
  - Anne Scott, who married firstly Richard Knatchbull, and secondly Sir Henry Bromley.
  - Mary Scott, who married Sir Anthony St. Leger (d.1603), of Ulcombe and Leeds, Kent, eldest son and heir of Sir Warham St Leger by his first wife, Ursula Neville, youngest daughter of George Neville, 5th Baron Abergavenny, by whom she was the mother of Sir Warham St Leger (d. 11 October 1631), who married Mary Hayward (d.1662), daughter of Sir Rowland Hayward. After the death of Sir Anthony St. Leger in 1603, his widow, Mary Scott, married Sir Alexander Culpeper (d. 15 April 1636) of Wigsell, Sussex.
- Secondly he married Elizabeth Heyman (d.1595), the daughter of Ralph Heyman of Somerfield, by whom he had no issue.
- Thirdly he married Dorothy Bere, the daughter of John Bere of Horsman's Place, Dartford, by whom he had no issue.

=== Sir John Scott (c. 1564-1616) ===
Sir John Scott (c. 1564-1616), of Scot's Hall and of Nettlestead Place in Kent, was an English soldier, Member of Parliament (MP) and an early investor in the Colony of Virginia. He married twice, but had no issue:

- Firstly, in 1590, to Elizabeth Stafford (c. 1546 – 6 February 1599), widow of Sir William Drury (30 May 1550 – 18 January 1590) of Hawstead, Suffolk, and daughter of Sir William Stafford (d. May 1556) by his wife, Dorothy Stafford (1 October 1526 – 22 September 1604), granddaughter of Edward Stafford, 3rd Duke of Buckingham. By his first marriage, Scott was the stepfather of Sir Robert Drury, friend of the poet, John Donne. Without issue.
- Secondly, before 17 September 1599, he married Katherine Smythe, widow of Sir Rowland Hayward, Lord Mayor of London, and daughter of Thomas Smythe (d.1591). She was baptised Katherine Smith on 6 Dec 1561 at All Hallows Lombard Street, City of London and is recorded in the Smythe pedigree taken during the Heraldic Visitation of London in 1568 and the Visitation of Kent in 1619 as the daughter of Thomas Smythe and Alice Judde. Without issue.

== See also ==
- Edward Scott (died 1646)
- John Scott (soldier)
- John Scott (died 1485)

== Bibliography ==
- Bindoff, S.T. (1982). The House of Commons 1509-1558. Vol. II. London: Secker & Warburg. ISBN 9780436042829.
- Boys, John Harvey (16 February 1847). "Fragments of Family History: the Baliols or Scots". The Patrician. 3. Great Britain: E. Churton.
- Brown, Alexander (1897). The Genesis of the United States. Vol. 2. Boston: Houghton Mifflin and Company. pp. 596–597. OCLC 680811104.
- Doran, Susan (January 2008). "Keys [née Grey], Lady Mary (1545?–1578)". Oxford Dictionary of National Biography (online ed.). Oxford University Press. doi:10.1093/ref:odnb/15503. (Subscription, Wikipedia Library access or UK public library membership required.)
- Glencross, Reginald M. (1922). "Virginia Gleanings in England". The Virginia Magazine of History and Biography. XXX. Richmond, Virginia: Virginia Historical Society: 363–364.
- Martin, G.H. (2004). "Baker, Sir Richard". Oxford Dictionary of National Biography (online ed.). Oxford University Press. doi:10.1093/ref:odnb/1131. (Subscription, Wikipedia Library access or UK public library membership required.)
- Richardson, Douglas (2011). Everingham, Kimball G. (ed.). Magna Carta Ancestry: A Study in Colonial and Medieval Families. Vol. I (2nd ed.). Salt Lake City: Douglas Richardson. ISBN 978-1449966379.
- Richardson, Douglas (2011). Everingham, Kimball G. (ed.). Magna Carta Ancestry: A Study in Colonial and Medieval Families. Vol. II (2nd ed.). Salt Lake City: Douglas Richardson. ISBN 9781731391681.
- Richardson, Douglas (2011). Everingham, Kimball G. (ed.). Magna Carta Ancestry: A Study in Colonial and Medieval Families. Vol. IV (2nd ed.). Salt Lake City: Douglas Richardson. ISBN 9781460992708.
- Rigg, J.M. (1897). "Scott, William (d.1350)" . In Lee, Sidney (ed.). Dictionary of National Biography. Vol. 51. London: Smith, Elder & Co. pp. 105–107.
- Rowe, Joy (2004). "Drury family (per. 1485–1624)". Oxford Dictionary of National Biography (online ed.). Oxford University Press. doi:10.1093/ref:odnb/73909. (Subscription, Wikipedia Library access or UK public library membership required.)
- Scott, Benjamin John (1914). The Norman Balliols in England; complied in part from Mr. Wentworth Huyshe's Harold and the Balliols. London: Blades, East & Blades.
- Scott, James Renat (1876). Memorials of the Family of Scott, of Scot's-Hall, In the County of Kent. With an Appendix of Illustrative Documents. London: J. R. Scott, Clevelands, Walthamstow, E. OCLC 1048814514.
- Scott, James Renat (1876). "The Scott monuments in Brabourne Church" (PDF). Archaeologia Cantiana. 10.
- Sherwood, George, ed. (December 1908). "Keyes, by R.J. Fynmore". The Pedigree Register 1907-1910. I. London: George Sherwood: 196–1988.
- White, Emma Siggins (1918). Genealogical Gleanings of Siggins and Other Pennsylvania Families. Kansas City, Missouri: Tiernan-Dart Printing Company. p. 543–545.
