= Henry Fleetwood (Aylesbury MP) =

English politician

Henry Fleetwood (born ca. 1565) was an English politician who sat in the House of Commons at various times between 1589 and 1611.

Fleetwood was the youngest son of Thomas Fleetwood of The Vache, Buckinghamshire and his second wife. He was educated at Gray's Inn in 1580 and was called to the bar in 1586. In 1589, he was elected Member of Parliament for Aylesbury.

Fleetwood became a Reader of Staple Inn in 1597 and an ancient of Gray's Inn in 1598. In 1601 he was elected MP for Wycombe. He was re-elected MP for Wycombe in 1604. Fleetwood was Lent reader in 1608 but was also found guilty of corruption by his inn of court in the same year.

Fleetwood married Elizabeth Fust, daughter of Edward Fust of London. He was the brother of George Fleetwood and William Fleetwood, MP for Middlesex.

Parliament of England
Preceded by Thomas Tasburgh; Thomas Scott	Member of Parliament for Aylesbury; 1589; With: Thomas Pigott	Succeeded by Sir Thomas West; John Lyly
Preceded by William Fortescue; John Tasburgh	Member of Parliament for Wycombe; 1601–1611; With: Richard Blount 1601–1604; Sir John Townsend 1604–1611	Succeeded by William Borlase; Sir Henry Neville
