= Thomas Pigott (Aylesbury MP) =

English politician

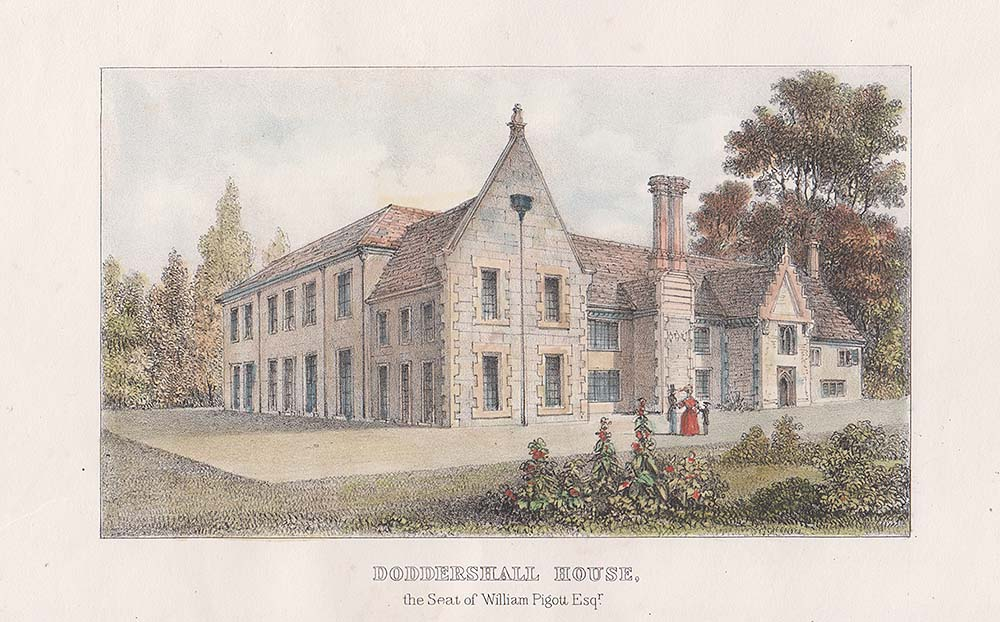
Doddershall House, Pigott family estate

Thomas Pigott of Doddershall, Buckinghamshire (fl. 1589) was an English politician and a Member (MP) of the Parliament of England.

== Family ==
Thomas Pigott was born to Thomas Pigott Sr. and Marie Lane, daughter of Sir Ralph Lane. His father was High Sheriff of Buckinghamshire in 1593–1594, and a justice of the peace for the county.

His uncle was the Welsh judge John Lloyd, while his half-cousin, the MP Thomas Pigott, was the son-in-law of Sir Richard Rich, 1st Baron Rich, Lord Chancellor of England.

Through his mother Mary Lane, Pigott was a grandson of Lady Maud Parr, the cousin of Queen Katherine Parr, and a nephew of Governor Sir Ralph Lane, Speaker Sir Edward Phelips, builder of Montacute House, and of Peter Wentworth, the brother-in-law of Sir Francis Walsingham.

Pigott married twice, firstly to Dorothy Cottenham, daughter and coheiress of Henry Cottenham of Norfolk. They had one son and one daughter. His second wife was a daughter of Sir John Allot, alderman and Lord Mayor of London.

== Career ==
He was a Member (MP) of the Parliament of England for Aylesbury in 1589. He was probably the Thomas Pigott who served as a Captain of the Buckinghamshire Trained Bands when they were called out during an invasion scare in 1599.

Parliament of England
Preceded by Thomas Tasburgh; Thomas Scott	Member of Parliament for Aylesbury; 1589; With: Henry Fleetwood	Succeeded by Sir Thomas West; John Lyly
