= John Allot =

English merchant and politician

Sir John Allot (or Allott) was a 16th-century English merchant and politician who served as Lord Mayor of London. He was the fourth son of a Lincolnshire squire, Richard Allot of Great Lymber. He came to London and joined the Worshipful Company of Fishmongers. He was elected in 1580 as one of the Sheriffs of London, serving with Ralph Woodcock, and in 1590 he was elected Lord Mayor of London. He did not finish his term, though.

He died on 17 September 1591 and was buried at St Margaret Moses; the remainder of his term was served by Sir Rowland Hayward (as his second term). He had a daughter, Margaret, who married William Albany of Oxsted. Another daughter, Anne, married Thomas Pigott, MP, and secondly Sir John Gibson, MP.

Civic offices
Preceded by John Harte	Lord Mayor of London; 1590–1591	Succeeded by Rowland Hayward
