= John Scott (soldier) =

English landowner, army officer and politician

The Honourable Sir John Scott JP DL
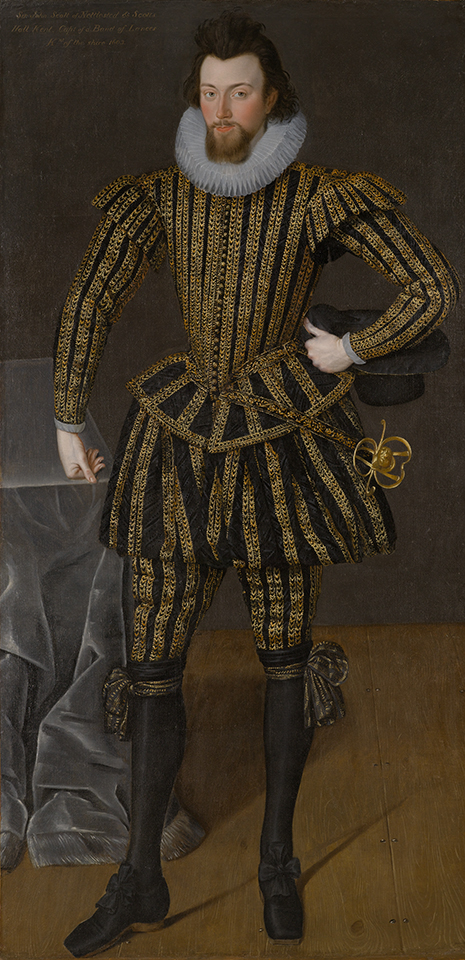
- Portrait of a Man, probably Sir John Scott, c. 1600-1605, Robert Peake the Elder

Member of Parliament for Kent
- In office 1604–1611
- Preceded by: Sir Francis Fane
- Succeeded by: Sir Peter Manwood

Member of Parliament for Maidstone
- In office 1614–1614
- Preceded by: Laurence Washington
- Succeeded by: Sir Francis Barnham

Personal details
- Born: c. 1564
- Died: 24 September 1616 (aged 51–52)
- Resting place: St Mary the Virgin's church, Brabourne; 51.1357°N 1.00549°E
- Spouses: Elizabeth Stafford (m. 1591; died 1599) Katherine Smythe (m. 1599)
- Parents: Sir Thomas Scott; Elizabeth Baker
- Education: Hart Hall, Oxford

Sir John Scott (c. 1564 – 24 September 1616), of Nettlestead and Scot's Hall, was an English landowner, army officer and politician. He was elected MP for the seat of Kent in 1604 and Maidstone in 1614. He was knighted in 1588.

== Early life ==
He was born around 1564, the second son of Sir Thomas Scott (d. 1594) of Scot's Hall and his first wife Elizabeth Baker, daughter of Sir John Baker of Sissinghurst, Kent.

He was a student at Hart Hall, Oxford, where he matriculated, on 20 May 1580, at the age of 16.

His father settled on his second son the manor house, Nettlestead Place, in Nettlestead, Kent and in his will left him £150. On the death of his older brother, Thomas, in 1610, he inherited Scot's Hall in Smeeth, Kent. In addition to Nettlestead and the Scot’s Hall estate, he also leased from the Crown nearby Aldington Park, a property that had come into his possession some years earlier following the death of two of his younger brothers.

== Career ==
He served as captain of a band of lancers in the English army in the Netherlands, and in 1588 was knighted in the field by Lord Willoughby for his services. In 1597 he commanded a ship in the expedition to the Azores.

In 1601, Scott was implicated in Essex's Rebellion but succeeded in clearing himself, and in the same year was a parliamentary candidate for Kent in 1601. He was unsuccessful on this first attempt, but was elected its MP in the Parliament of 1604 and for Maidstone in the Addled Parliament of 1614.

In November 1603 Anne of Denmark appointed him as one of the advisors for the administration of her English jointure lands. Scott was an early investor in the Colony of Virginia. He became a member of the Council for Virginia in 1607, the year when that colony was re-established, subscribing £75, and was a councillor of the Virginia Company of London in 1609.

By 1593 he was a justice of the peace (JP) for Kent; captain of militia, foot, from 1598 to 1601, and horse in 1611. From 1601 he served as Deputy lieutenant; commissioner for sewers, Kent and Sussex from 1602 to 1609, inquiry, lands and goods of George Brooke, Kent, in 1603, and subsidy from 1607 to 1608.

He was made a freeman of Maidstone in 1612, and was a commissioner for aid, Kent, in 1612; collector, composition for purveyance, Aylesford division, Kent, in 1614; commissioner for charitable uses from 1615 to 1616.

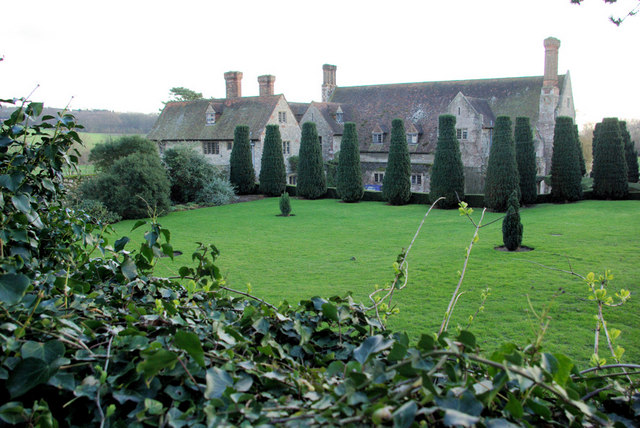
Nettlestead Place, Nettlestead, Kent

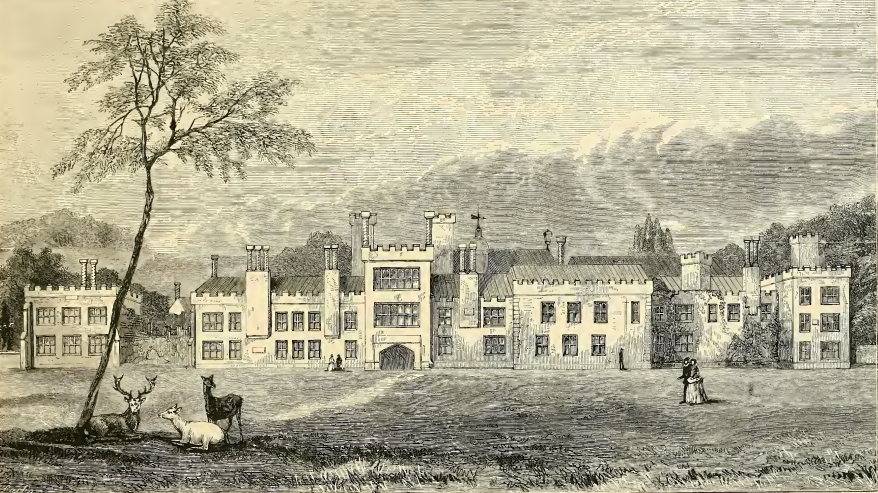
Scot's Hall, Smeeth, Kent

== Marriages ==
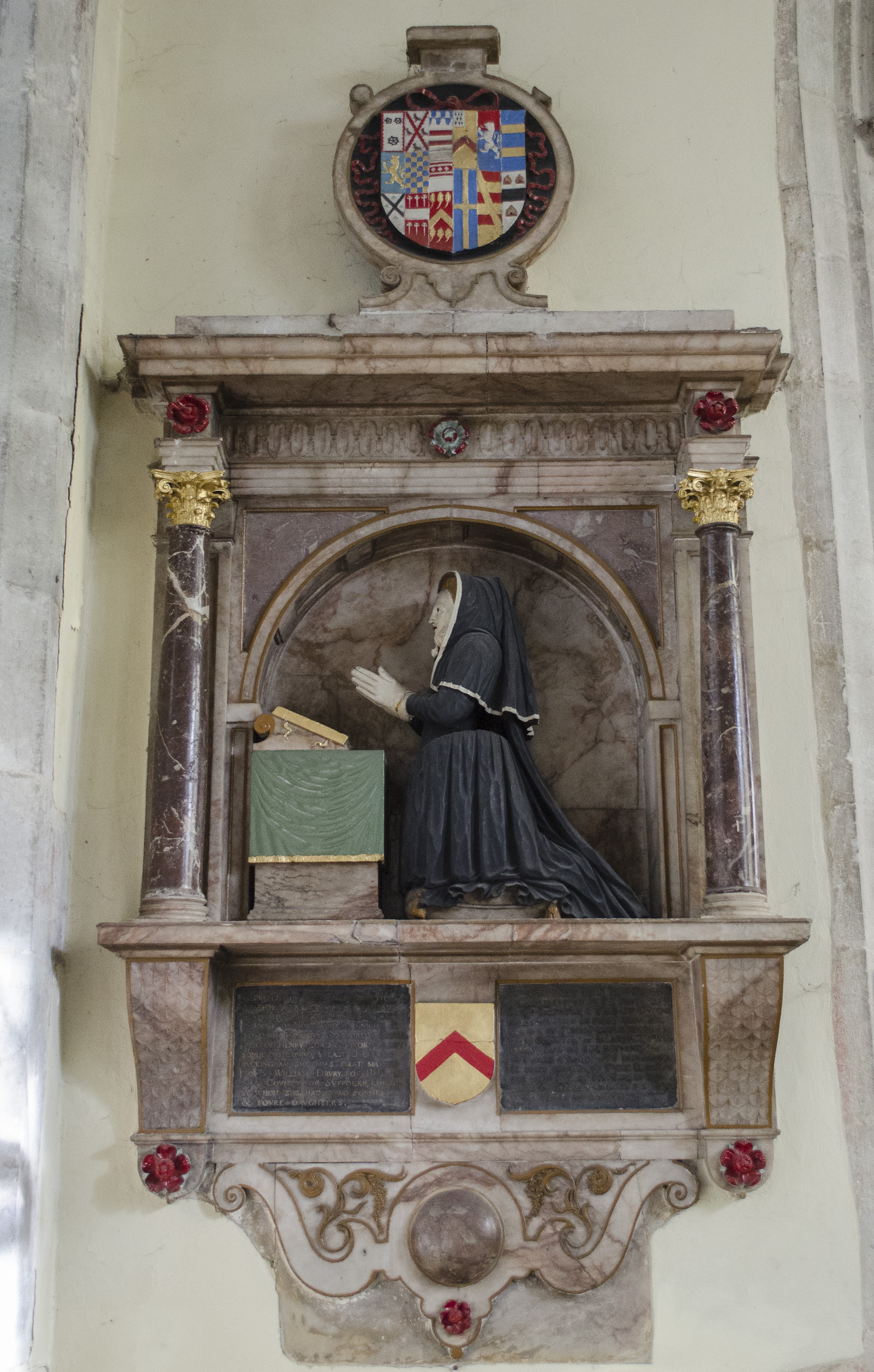
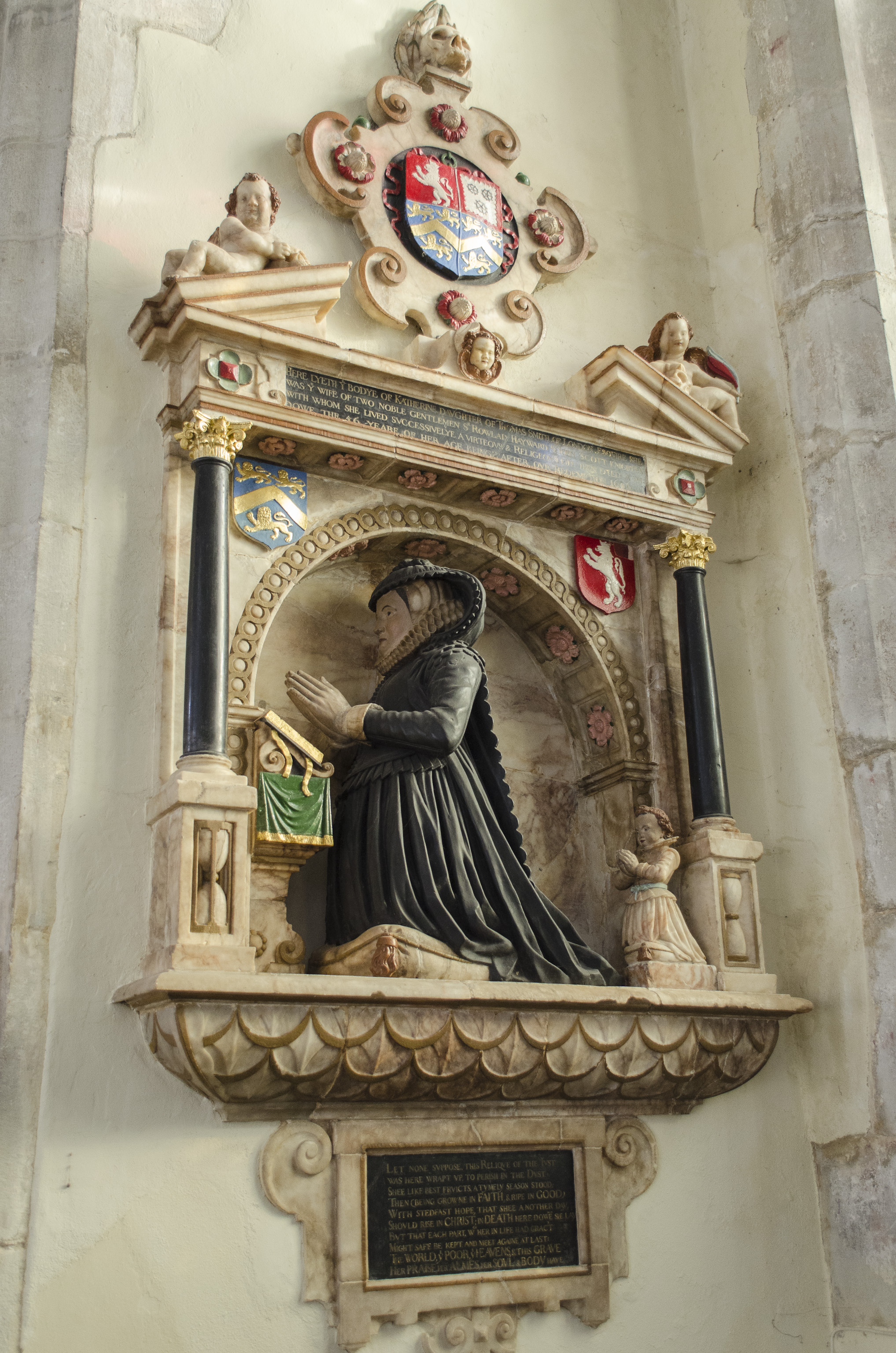
Mural monuments to both wives of Sir John Scott in St Mary's Church, Nettlestead. Left: Elizabeth Stafford; right: Katherine Smythe

Scott married twice, but had no children by either wife:

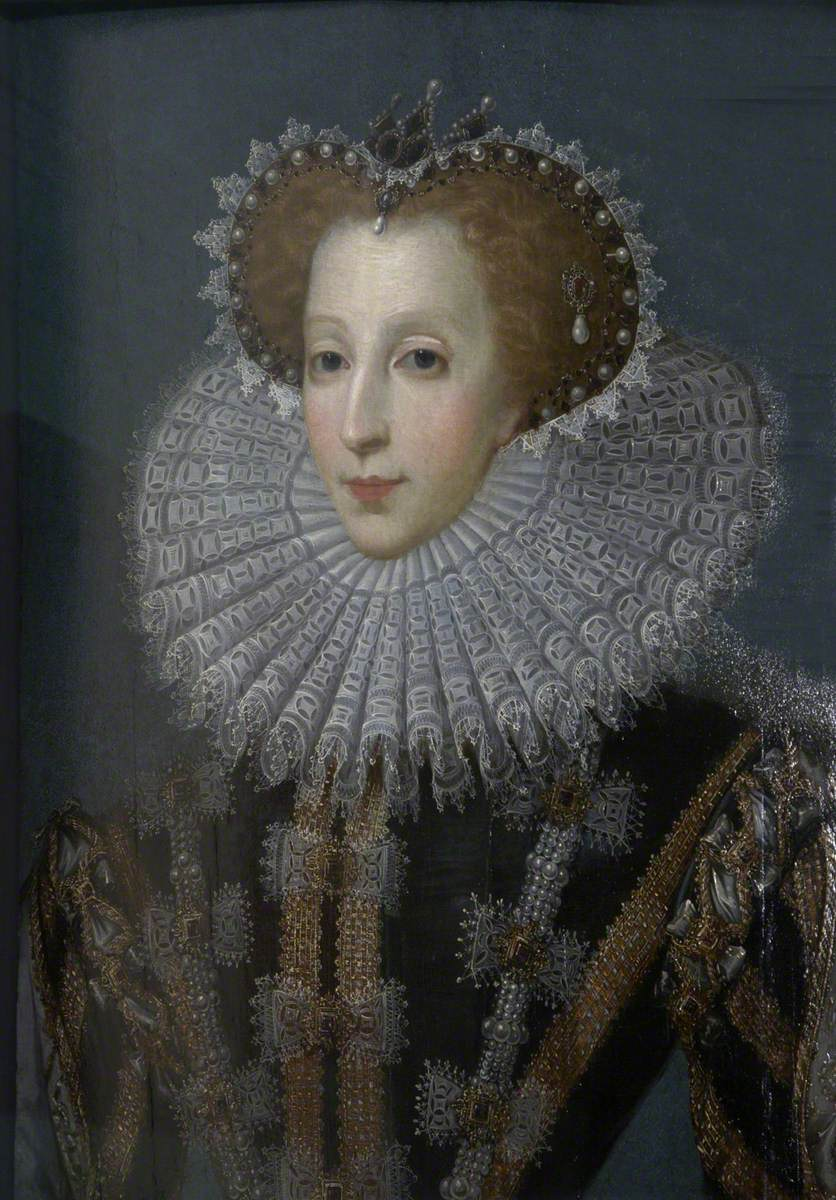
Elizabeth Stafford, Lady Drury, 16th century, unknown artist

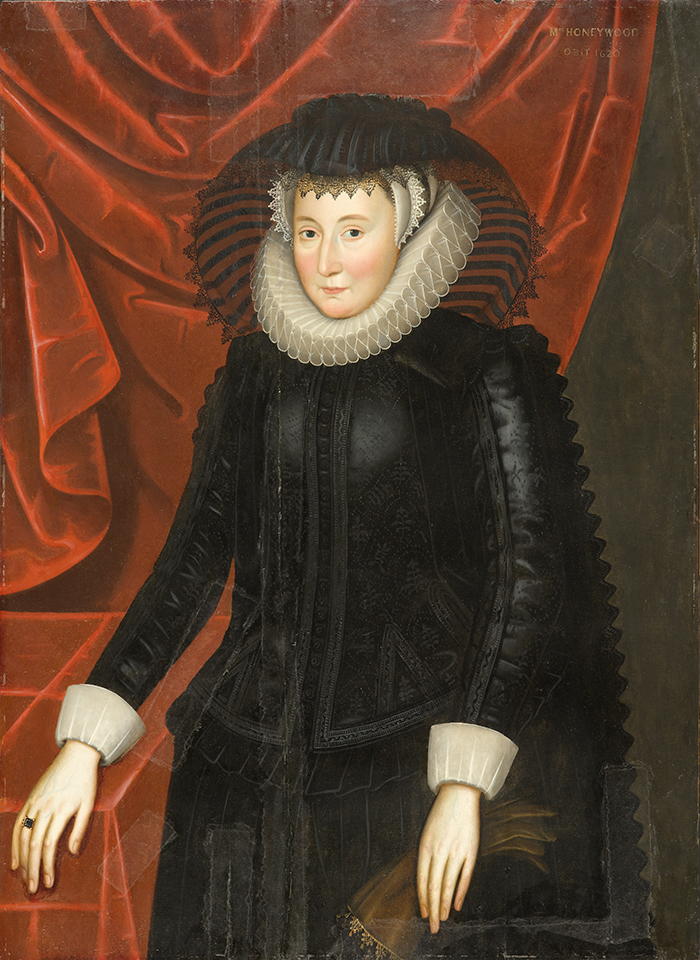
Portrait of Lady Katherine Smythe Scott, circa 1625, Wiliam Larkin
- Firstly, in about 1591, he married Elizabeth Stafford (d. 1599), widow of Sir William Drury (d. 1590) of Hawstead, Suffolk, and daughter of Sir William Stafford (d. 1556) and Dorothy Stafford (d. 1604), granddaughter of Edward Stafford, 3rd Duke of Buckingham. By his first marriage, Scott was the stepfather of Sir Robert Drury (d. 1615), friend of the poet, John Donne. She died on 6 February 1599 and was buried in St Mary's Church, Nettlestead, where a mural monument dedicated to her survives.
- Secondly, before 17 September 1599, he married Katherine Smythe (1561–1617), widow of Sir Rowland Hayward (d. 1593), and daughter of Thomas Smythe (d.1591) and Alice Judde. She was baptised on 6 December 1561 at All Hallows Lombard Street, City of London and is recorded in the Smythe pedigree taken during the Heraldic Visitation of London in 1568 and the Visitation of Kent in 1619 as the daughter of Thomas Smythe and Alice Judde.

== Death ==
He died without issue on 24 September 1616 and was buried in Brabourne church, Kent; in the Scott Chapel, there is a tablet as follows:

Here liest the body of Sir John Scott, son of Sir Thomas Scott,
Justice of the Peace, and
Captain of a Company .... Troop of Lancers.
A.D. 24 Sept., 1616.
This monument was placed here by appointment of his brother,
Sir Ed. Scott, Knight of the Order of the Bath.

His widow, who survived him by about six months, died in early 1617, and was buried in St Mary's Church, Nettlestead, where her mural monument survives. Nettlestead Place and the Scot's Hall estate passed to his younger brother, Edward.

== Arms ==
Coat of arms of John Scott
Notes "Illuminated pedigree of the Scott family of Scot's Hall, Kent, evidently prepared for Sir John Scott of Nettlestead, Kent". Crest A demi-griffin sable; With second crest of Scott above left: A Catherine Wheel of five spokes sable. Escutcheon Quarterly of 9:— 1. Scott: Argent, three Catherine Wheels of five spokes sable a bordure gules; 2. Beaufitz ("Bewfice"): Argent, a saltire engrailed gules between four ravens proper; 3. Pympe: Gules, two bars argent a chief vair; 4. Pashley Purpure: a lion rampant tail forked and nowed or crowned argent; 5. Normanvile: Gules, a fess double cotised argent; 6. de Warrenne, Earl of Surrey: Checquy or and azure; 7. Sergeaux (Sergea..y): Ermine, a saltire sable; 8. Gower: Gules, a fess between six cross crosslets argent; 9. Cogan: Gules, a chevron between three leaves argent.
