= Listed buildings in Smeeth =

Civil Parish in Kent, England

Smeeth is a village and civil parish in the Borough of Ashford of Kent, England. It contains one grade I, two grade II* and 34 grade II listed buildings that are recorded in the National Heritage List for England.

This list is based on the information retrieved online from Historic England.

== Key ==
Grade	Criteria
I	Buildings that are of exceptional interest
II*	Particularly important buildings of more than special interest
II	Buildings that are of special interest

== Listing ==
Name	Grade	Location	Type	Completed (Note: The date given is the date used by Historic England as significant for the initial building or that of an important part in the structure's description.)	Date designated	Grid ref. (Note: The grid reference is based on the British national grid reference system, sometimes known as OSGB36, used by the Ordnance Survey.) Geo-coordinates	Notes	Entry number (Note: The "List Entry Number" is a unique number assigned to each listed building and scheduled monument by Historic England.)	Image	Wikidata
Smeeth War Memorial	II				2 October 2017	TR0719639566; 51°07′04″N 0°57′33″E		1448318	Upload Photo	Q66478877
Barn and Courtyard Walls 25 Metres to North of Church Farmhouse	II	Church Road			10 August 1988	TR0722539696; 51°07′09″N 0°57′35″E		1071170	Upload Photo	Q26326138
Chest Tomb to Elizabeth Ball About 15 Metres East of Church of St Mary	II	Church Road			10 August 1988	TR0725139610; 51°07′06″N 0°57′36″E		1071167	Upload Photo	Q26326131
Chest Tomb to Thomas Wyborn, About 2 Metres South of Church of St Mary	II	About 2 Metres South Of Church Of St Mary, Church Road			10 August 1988	TR0723339603; 51°07′06″N 0°57′35″E		1362792	Upload Photo	Q26644659
Church Cottages	II	Church Road			10 August 1988	TR0725239565; 51°07′04″N 0°57′36″E		1071168	Upload Photo	Q26326133
Church Farmhouse	II	Church Road			10 August 1988	TR0721239681; 51°07′08″N 0°57′34″E		1362795	Upload Photo	Q26644662
Church House	II	Church Road			27 November 1957	TR0723339527; 51°07′03″N 0°57′35″E		1362794	Upload Photo	Q26644661
Church of St Mary	I	Church Road			27 November 1957	TR0722539614; 51°07′06″N 0°57′34″E		1071165	Church of St Mary More images	Q17529268
Group of 4 Chest Tombs, 2 Barrel Tombs and Headstones About 5 Metres South West of Church of St Mary	II	2 Barrel Tombs And Headstones About 5 Metres South West Of Church Of St Mary, Church Road			10 August 1988	TR0721239602; 51°07′06″N 0°57′34″E		1071166	Upload Photo	Q26326129
Lower Meadows Meadows	II	Church Road			27 November 1957	TR0730139630; 51°07′06″N 0°57′38″E		1299809	Upload Photo	Q26587170
Sundial About 10 Metres South of Church of St Mary	II	Church Road			10 August 1988	TR0722539596; 51°07′05″N 0°57′34″E		1362793	Upload Photo	Q26644660
Kimberley Cottage	II	Granary Court Road			10 August 1988	TR0902139520; 51°07′01″N 0°59′06″E		1362796	Upload Photo	Q26644663
Little Granary Court	II	Granary Court Road			10 August 1988	TR0926839902; 51°07′13″N 0°59′20″E		1071171	Upload Photo	Q26326140
Pound House	II	Granary Court Road			10 August 1988	TR0904340427; 51°07′30″N 0°59′09″E		1185208	Upload Photo	Q26480521
Homelands	II	Hythe Road			27 November 1957	TR0648039747; 51°07′11″N 0°56′56″E		1185281	Upload Photo	Q26480594
Smeeth Hill House	II	Hythe Road			10 August 1988	TR0736939484; 51°07′02″N 0°57′42″E		1071172	Upload Photo	Q26326142
Stable/granary About 20 Metres North West of Water Farm House	II	Hythe Road			10 August 1988	TR0814638888; 51°06′41″N 0°58′20″E		1362797	Upload Photo	Q26644664
Stable/outbuildings About 10 Metres South West of Homelands	II	Hythe Road			10 August 1988	TR0646139737; 51°07′11″N 0°56′55″E		1071173	Upload Photo	Q26326145
Stable/outbuildings About 25 Metres South West of Homelands	II	Hythe Road			10 August 1988	TR0646139723; 51°07′10″N 0°56′55″E		1185295	Upload Photo	Q26480608
Stables and Walled Garden to Mersham-le-hatch	II	Hythe Road			10 August 1988	TR0609340237; 51°07′28″N 0°56′38″E		1299770	Upload Photo	Q26587136
Water Farm House	II	Hythe Road			10 August 1988	TR0815738856; 51°06′40″N 0°58′21″E		1185259	Upload Photo	Q26480574
Barn Adjoining Lily Vale Farmhouse to the North West	II	Lily Vale			10 August 1988	TR0880739512; 51°07′01″N 0°58′55″E		1299732	Upload Photo	Q26587101
Lily Vale Farmhouse	II	Lily Vale			10 August 1988	TR0881139496; 51°07′00″N 0°58′56″E		1071174	Upload Photo	Q26326148
Washington	II	Lily Vale			10 August 1988	TR0891339276; 51°06′53″N 0°59′00″E		1071175	Upload Photo	Q26326150
Lodge House	II*	Plain Road			10 August 1988	TR0852039673; 51°07′06″N 0°58′41″E		1185326	Upload Photo	Q17556383
Evegate Manor	II*	Station Road			27 November 1957	TR0682238975; 51°06′46″N 0°57′12″E		1362798	Upload Photo	Q17556920
Evegate Mill	II	Station Road			10 August 1988	TR0637638094; 51°06′18″N 0°56′48″E		1071180	Upload Photo	Q26326160
Evegate Millhouse	II	Station Road			10 August 1988	TR0637738114; 51°06′19″N 0°56′48″E		1185369	Upload Photo	Q26480685
Stable/outbuilding About 20 Yards North West of Evegate Mill House	II	Station Road			10 August 1988	TR0635638127; 51°06′19″N 0°56′47″E		1185387	Upload Photo	Q26480704
Holly Cottage	II	The Ridgeway			10 August 1988	TR0647040001; 51°07′19″N 0°56′56″E		1299713	Upload Photo	Q26587083
Ivydene	II	The Ridgeway			10 August 1988	TR0715740057; 51°07′20″N 0°57′32″E		1071177	Upload Photo	Q26326154
Lyncroft Stores	II	The Ridgeway			10 August 1988	TR0647040019; 51°07′20″N 0°56′56″E		1299711	Upload Photo	Q26587081
Old Post Office	II	The Ridgeway			10 August 1988	TR0647240011; 51°07′20″N 0°56′57″E		1071179	Upload Photo	Q26326159
Outbuilding About 15 Metres East of Ivydene	II	The Ridgeway			10 August 1988	TR0718340052; 51°07′20″N 0°57′33″E		1299707	Upload Photo	Q26587079
Park Cottage	II	The Ridgeway			10 August 1988	TR0648140055; 51°07′21″N 0°56′57″E		1071178	Upload Photo	Q26326156
Ridgeway Cottages	II	1, 2 and 3, The Ridgeway			10 August 1988	TR0719140050; 51°07′20″N 0°57′34″E		1071176	Upload Photo	Q26326152
Boundary and Garden Walls to North and West of Church House, with Gateway	II	With Gateway, Church Road			10 August 1988	TR0722439551; 51°07′04″N 0°57′34″E		1071169	Upload Photo	Q26326135

== See also ==
- Grade I listed buildings in Kent
- Grade II* listed buildings in Kent

== Sources ==
- Newman, John (2012) [1969], Kent: West and the Weald, The Buildings of England, New Haven and London: Yale University Press, ISBN 978-0-300-18509-6
