= Rowland Hayward =

London merchant and Lord Mayor

Sir Rowland Hayward
- Arms of Hayward of Essex: Gules, a lion rampant argent crowned or
- Born: c. 1520
- Died: 5 December 1593
- Buried: St Alphage London Wall
- Spouses: Joan Tillesworth; Katherine Smythe
- Issue: Sir George Hayward; Sir John Hayward four sons who died as infants Elizabeth Hayward; Susan Hayward; Joan Hayward; Alice Hayward; Katherine Hayward; Mary Hayward; Anne Hayward three daughters who died as infants
- Father: George Hayward
- Mother: Margaret Whitbrooke

Sir Rowland Hayward (c. 1520 – 5 December 1593) was a London slave merchant, and Lord Mayor of the City in both 1570 and 1591. Through his commercial activities he acquired considerable wealth, and was able to loan money to Queen Elizabeth I and purchase properties in several counties as well as houses in and near London. He entertained the Queen at King's Place in 1587.

== Family ==
Hayward was the eldest son of George Hayward (d. 1557) of Bridgnorth, Shropshire, by Margaret Whitbrooke, the daughter of John Whitbrooke. George Hayward carried on the trade of shoemaker in Bridgnorth, was Member of Parliament for Bridgnorth in 1529 and alderman of the town about 1543.

== Career ==
Hayward was educated locally at Bridgnorth Free School. He moved to London when he was about twelve years of age, and was apprenticed to a clothworker, becoming free of the Company of Clothworkers in 1541 or 1542.

In 1558, Hayward attended the Lord Mayor at the coronation banquet of Queen Elizabeth I. In 1559 he was Master of the Clothworkers. In 1560, he was elected Alderman, a dignity to which no citizen worth less than 2000 marks could then attain, and in the same year, together with another Alderman, loaned the City £1000 towards the purchase of wheat. In 1561, he became President of Bridewell Hospital, and remained involved in the administration of London's hospitals until his death. He was elected Sheriff in 1563–64.

Hayward quickly became one of London's "commercial magnates". Before 1563 he was trading with Antwerp. As a member of the Company of Merchant Adventurers he exported English cloth, and imported from abroad coarse materials such as fustian and buckram and luxury fabrics such as camlet and silk. In 1565 he played a role in the founding of the Royal Exchange.

In 1567, he was one of the promoters of Sir John Hawkins' third slave-trading voyage. He was a founding member of the Muscovy Company, serving as its Governor on eight occasions during the years 1567–1587. He was named as among its leading merchants in both 1567, when Czar Ivan the Terrible granted the Company a monopoly, and in 1570, when the Shah of Persia granted the Company a similar licence.

From 1568 onward, he also served as Governor of the Company of Mineral and Battery Works. In 1570 he was elected Lord Mayor of London, and knighted in 1571. In 1572 he was elected to Parliament for the City, where he played an active role on several committees, and in the same year became President of St Bartholomew's Hospital, a post he continued to hold until his death.

In 1582, he was among the investors in Edward Fenton's 'disastrous' voyage to the Far East. He served as lord mayor again in 1591, taking over when Sir John Allot died in September without having completed his term.

According to Jay, 'No mention of Sir Rowland's specific services to London can give any idea of his unwearying devotion to the city of his adoption'.

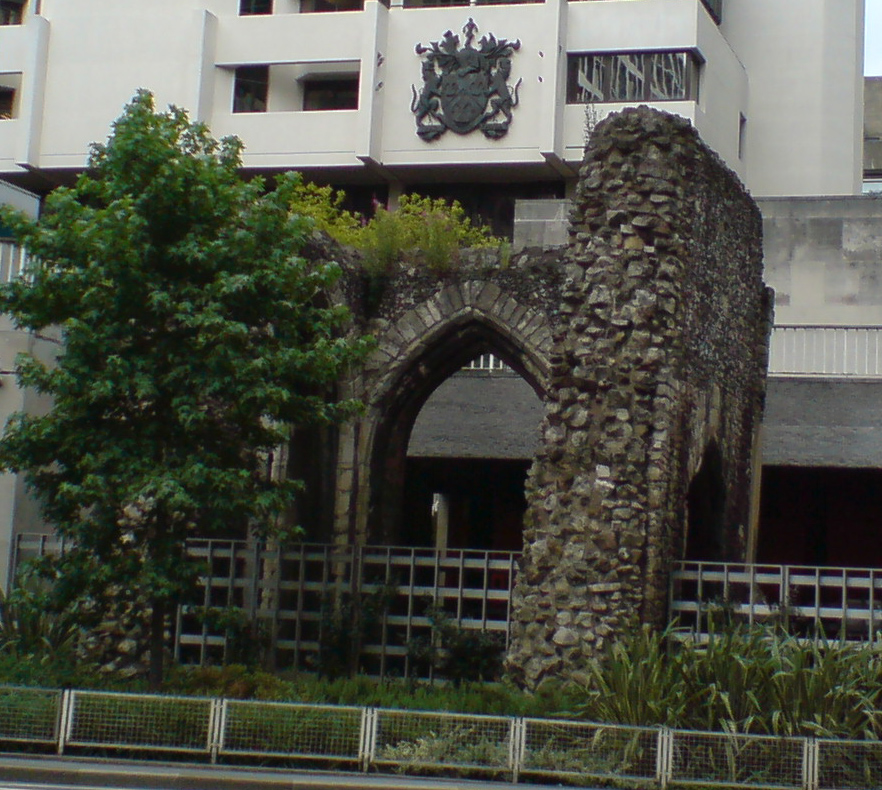
Ruins of the church of St Alphage London Wall

Hayward's increasing wealth from his commercial ventures allowed him to loan money to the Queen, and to acquire considerable property over the years. By 1553 he had purchased property in four counties, some of which had become available through the dissolution of the monasteries. At the time of his death in 1593 he owned seventeen manors in several counties, as well as a house in London and another just outside the City.

His London house was on the site of the former Priory of St Mary the Virgin, founded in 1332 by William Elsing, for canons regular, (originally a Hospital for one hundred blind men, known as "Elsing's 'Spital") situated at the north end of Gayspur Lane, which ran down to London Wall. The Priory was suppressed at the dissolution of the monasteries and turned into a mansion house. The house was in Philip Lane, London Wall, and adjoined the church of St Alphage; Hayward purchased it for £700 from Margery Williams, the daughter of John Williams, 1st Baron Williams of Thame, and wife of Henry Norris, 1st Baron Norris. Hayward's country home was King's Place in Hackney, which had earlier been owned by King Henry VIII and was the scene, in July 1536, of a reconciliation between the King and his elder daughter, Mary. Hayward purchased it from Henry Carey, 1st Baron Hunsdon in 1583.

In 1587, Hayward entertained Queen Elizabeth at King's Place when she was on her way to Lord Burghley's house of Theobalds.

Hayward died 5 December 1593 at King's Place in Hackney, and was buried at the church of St Alphage London Wall. A monument depicting Hayward with his two wives on either side, each with her eight children, was erected to his memory by two of his executors, William Pilsworth and William Cotton, in the wall of the choir on the south side of the church.

In his will, dated 17 November 1592 and proved 4 March 1594, he left a third of his property to his wife and another third to his children, according to the custom of the City of London, with the remaining third devoted to his own personal bequests, including gifts for charitable purposes. He directed that his house of King's Place in Hackney be sold. In 1596, Elizabeth Trentham, Countess of Oxford, purchased it from his executors; she lived in it for more than a decade, and sold it in 1609 to Fulke Greville, 1st Baron Brooke. Among the overseers named in Hayward's will were Thomas Owen (died 1598) and William Sebright (died 1620).

== Marriages and issue ==
Hayward first married, at St Peter, Westcheap in July 1546, to Joan Tyllesworth, daughter and coheir of the London goldsmith William Tyllesworth. By her, according to the inscription on his monument, he had three sons and two daughters who died as infants, and three surviving daughters. Joan died in 1580.

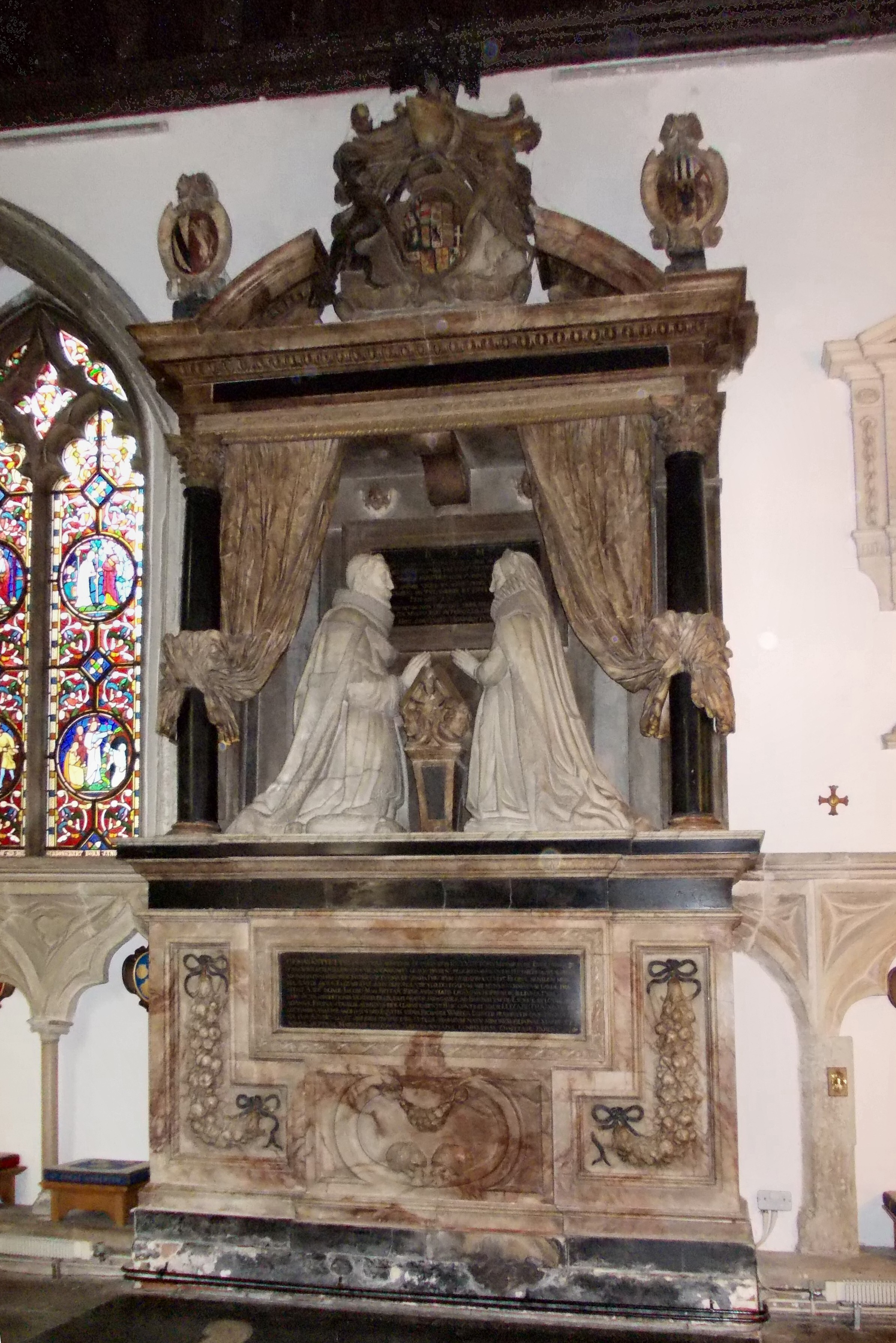
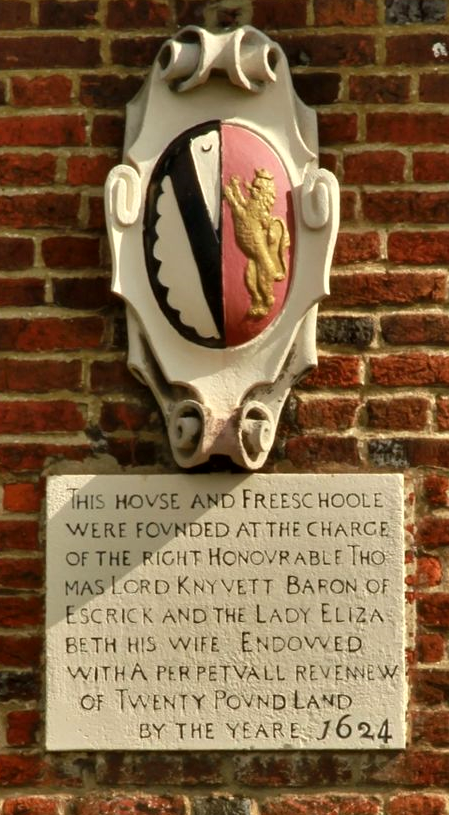
Left: Monument to Thomas Knyvet, 1st Baron Knyvet and his wife Elizabeth Hayward, Stanwell Church, Surrey. Right: Founder's inscribed tablet and arms, above entrance door of Lord Knyvett's Free School, High Street, Stanwell, Middlesex. Founded by the will of Thomas Knyvet, 1st Baron Knyvet. The cartouche above shows the arms of Kynvett impaling Hayward (Gules, a lion rampant argent crowned or), for his wife Elizabeth Hayward
- Elizabeth Hayward, who married firstly Sir Richard Warren (died March 1597) of Claybury, Essex, and secondly, on 21 July 1597, Thomas Knyvet, 1st Baron Knyvet of Escrick. Her kneeling effigy survives together with that of her second husband on his monument in Stanwell Church, Surrey.
- Susan Hayward (died 1592), who married Sir Henry Townshend (1537?–1621), by whom she was the mother of Hayward Townshend, (c. 1577–1603x21).
- Joan Hayward, who married John Thynne on (probably) 26 February 1576.

Hayward married secondly, when she was only sixteen years of age, Katherine Smythe, the daughter of Thomas Smythe, Customer of London, by whom he had a son and a daughter who died as infants, and two surviving sons and four surviving daughters, all young and unmarried at the time of his death:

- Sir George Hayward (died July 1615), who died without issue.
- Sir John Hayward (c. 1591 – 11 April 1636), who married, about 1622, his kinswoman Anne Sondes, widow of Gabriel Livesey (died 28 March 1622) of Hollingbourne, Kent, and daughter of Sir Michael Sondes of Throwley, Kent. He inherited an estate said to be worth £80,000 from his elder brother, Sir George Hayward, in July 1615, but died without issue, the last of the male heirs in his line.
- Alice Hayward, who married Sir Richard Buller (died 1642) of Shillingham, Cornwall.
- Katherine Hayward, who married Richard Scott, son of Sir Thomas Scott.
- Mary Hayward (died 1662), who married Sir Warham St Leger (died 11 October 1631), son of Sir Anthony St. Leger (died 1603) and Mary Scott, and grandson of Sir Warham St Leger by his first wife, Ursula Neville, youngest daughter of George Neville, 5th Baron Bergavenny.
- Anne Hayward, who according to Botfield died unmarried; however according to Hovendon, she married Edward Craford or Crayford (1577–1615), eldest son of Sir William Craford (d. 1623) and Anne Norton of Great Mongeham, Kent, by whom she had four sons and a daughter. The memorial to Edward Craford in the parish church at Great Mongeham reads:

Here lyeth the body of Edward Crayford esq eldest sonne of Sr Will Crayford of Great Mongeham who by Anne his wife one of the daughters of Sr Rowland Hayward thrice [sic] Lord Maior of London who had yssue will [sic: Willm] George Richard Iohn + Anne, he dyed ye 28th of Sept 1615 of his age ye xxxixth vnto whose memorie Anne his wife hath dedicated this.

After Sir Rowland Hayward's death, his widow, Katherine, married Sir John Scott, son of Sir Thomas Scott.

== Notes ==
Civic offices
Preceded by Alexander Avenon	Lord Mayor of London; 1570–1571	Succeeded by William Allen
Preceded by John Allot	Lord Mayor of London; 1591	Succeeded by William Webbe
