= Smeeth =

Village in Kent, England

Coordinates: 51.1189°N 0.9616°E

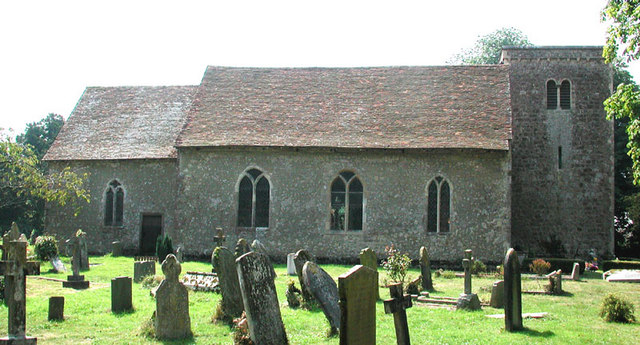
- St Mary the Virgin's Church

- Location within Kent
- Area: 8.29 km^{2} (3.20 sq mi)
- Population: 924 (Civil Parish 2011)
  - Density: 111/km^{2} (290/sq mi)
- OS grid reference: TR072397
- Civil parish: Smeeth
- District: Ashford
- Shire county: Kent
- Region: South East
- Country: England
- Sovereign state: United Kingdom
- Post town: ASHFORD
- Postcode district: TN25
- Dialling code: 01303
- Police: Kent
- Fire: Kent
- Ambulance: South East Coast
- UK Parliament: Ashford

Smeeth is a mostly agricultural land use village and civil parish, centred 4 miles (6.4 km) east of Ashford in the Ashford Borough of Kent, England.

== Geography ==
Smeeth is a small village in population near Mersham Hatch Park on the A20 road from Ashford to Folkestone.

The church of St Mary the Virgin contains some Norman work such as the south doorway, tower archways and chancel. Edward Knatchbull-Hugessen, 1st Baron Brabourne is buried in the churchyard.

Three east-west routes pass quite near to the middle of the parish and are aligned east-west: the M20 motorway, the A20 single carriageway road and the High Speed 1 railway line connecting to the Channel Tunnel. Most of the development is residential and all of the neighbourhoods are north of the motorway. The parish has many headwaters to the East Stour which bounds Smeeth to its south. The far northern borders are contiguous with Brabourne Lees and link into its main 'village street' directly; this is also where most of the buffer land is woodland it also had a railway owend by SER.

== See also ==
- Listed buildings in Smeeth
