= Elizabeth Stafford =

English noblewoman (1546–1599)

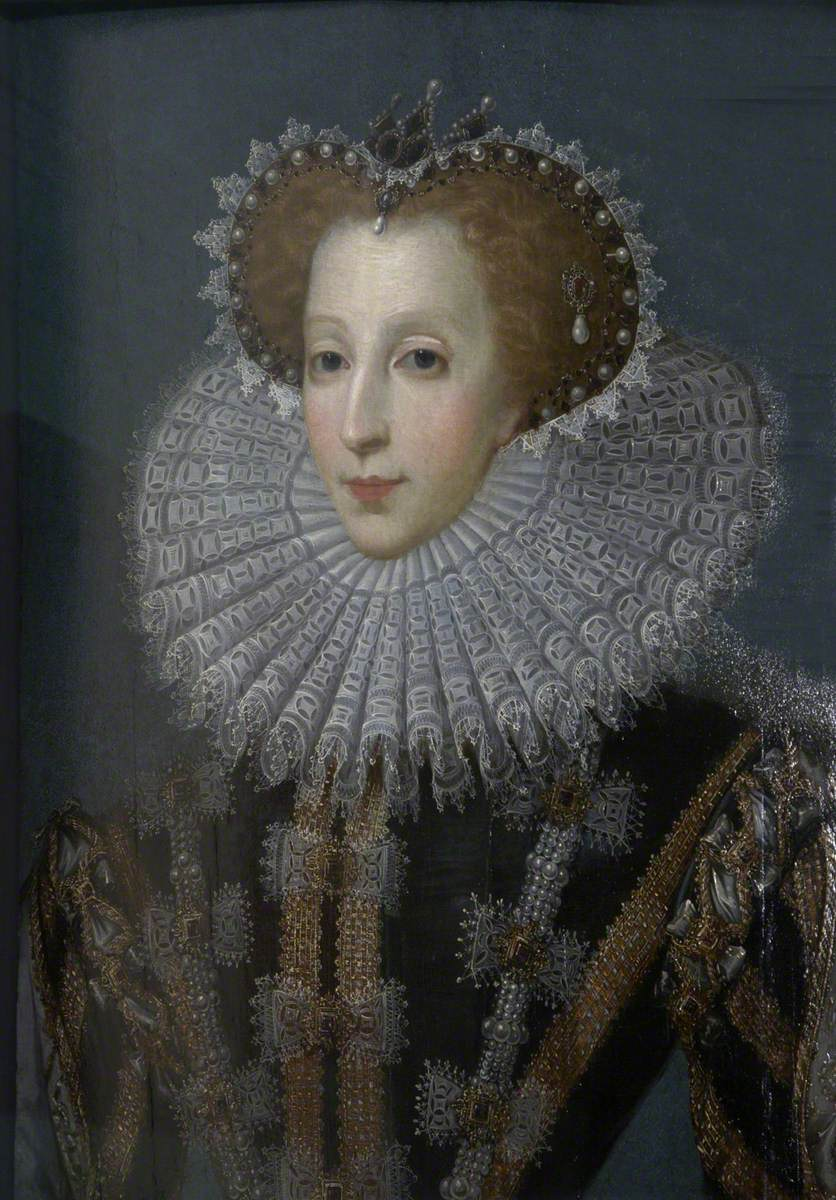
- Elizabeth Stafford, Lady Drury
- Born: 1546
- Died: 6 February 1599 (aged 52–53)
- Buried: St Mary's Church, Nettlestead; 51.243404°N 0.412777°E
- Noble family: Stafford
- Spouses: Sir William Drury (died 1590) Sir John Scott (m. 1591)
- Issue: Sir Robert Drury; Charles Drury; Frances Drury; Elizabeth Drury; Diana Drury; Susanna Drury
- Father: Sir William Stafford
- Mother: Dorothy Stafford

Elizabeth Stafford (1546 – 6 February 1599), also known as Dame Elizabeth Drury and – in the years prior to her death – Dame (Lady) Elizabeth Scott, was a Lady of the Bedchamber to Queen Elizabeth I. She and her first husband, Sir William Drury, entertained Queen Elizabeth I at Hawstead in 1578.

== Family ==
Elizabeth Stafford was the daughter of Sir William Stafford (d. 5 May 1556) of Chebsey, Staffordshire, and Rochford Hall, Essex, second son of Sir Humphrey Stafford of Blatherwycke, Northamptonshire, by Margaret Fogge, the daughter of Sir John Fogge of Ashford, Kent.

Elizabeth Stafford's parents were second cousins. Her mother was Dorothy Stafford (1 October 1526 – September 1604), the daughter of Henry Stafford, 1st Baron Stafford (1501–1563), son and heir of Edward Stafford, 3rd Duke of Buckingham, by Ursula Pole (d. 1570). Through her mother, Elizabeth Stafford and her siblings were of royal blood.

Dorothy Stafford married Sir William Stafford, as his second wife, in 1545. In 1534 he had secretly wed, as her second husband, Mary Boleyn (c. 1499–1543), sister of King Henry VIII's second wife, Anne Boleyn. Mary Boleyn is said to have been pregnant at the time of her marriage to Sir William Stafford; however if there were children of the marriage, nothing further is known of them.

Elizabeth Stafford had three brothers and two sisters of the whole blood:

- Sir Edward Stafford (1552–1604) of Grafton, who married firstly, Roberta Chapman (d. 1578), the daughter of Alexander Chapman of Rainthorpe Hall, Norfolk, by whom he had a son and two daughters, and secondly, on 29 November 1597, Douglas Sheffield (1547–1608), daughter of William Howard, 1st Baron Howard of Effingham, and sister of Charles Howard, 1st Earl of Nottingham.
- William Stafford (1554–1612), conspirator, who about 1593 married Anne Gryme (d. 1612), daughter of Thomas Gryme of Antingham, Norfolk, by whom he had a daughter, Dorothy Stafford, and a son, William Stafford (1593–1684).
- Sir John Stafford of Marlwood Park (January 1556 – 28 September 1624), Thornbury, Gloucestershire, who married firstly, Bridget Clopton (d. March 1574), the daughter of William Clopton of Kentwell Hall, by whom he had a son, and secondly, on 29 January 1580, Millicent Gresham (buried 24 December 1602), the daughter of Edmund Gresham (buried 31 August 1586) and Joan Hynde, by whom he had no issue.
- Ursula Stafford (b. 1553), who married Richard Drake (d. 11 July 1603) of Esher, Surrey, equerry to Elizabeth I, third son of John Drake (d. 1558), esquire, of Ash in Musbury, Devonshire, and brother of Bernard Drake, by whom she had a son, Francis Drake (d. 1633).
- Dorothy Stafford, who likely died in infancy.

== Career ==
Elizabeth Stafford's parents were staunch Protestants, and on 29 March 1555, during the reign of the Catholic Mary I, they took their two children, Elizabeth and Edward, in the company of a cousin, Elizabeth Sandys, into exile. In 1556 they were in Geneva, where on 4 January 1556 the Protestant reformer, John Calvin, stood as godfather to their youngest son, John Stafford, and where Sir William Stafford died, and was buried on 5 May of that year. After Sir William Stafford's death a dispute ensued with Calvin over the custody of his godson, John Stafford, and Dorothy Stafford 'managed to escape' with her children, in the company of Elizabeth Sandys, to Basel, where the Stafford family were neighbours of the Protestant reformer John Knox. In November 1558 Queen Mary died and Elizabeth I acceded to the throne, and on 14 January 1559 Dorothy Stafford and her children left Basel for England. The family took up residence for a time at Waltham, Essex.

She joined her mother, Dorothy, in Queen Elizabeth's service. The Scottish envoy James Melville of Halhill met them both at court in 1564. He had known them in France. On 26 October 1568, Elizabeth Stafford, identified as one of the Queen's chamberers, was given a black satin gown with black velvet edgings or guards. She received £20 yearly on St Andrew's Day with fabric for her livery clothes of russet satin edged with black velvet. Elizabeth I gave her twenty yards of velvet for a gown on 6 November 1573 "agaynst her Mariage to Mr Drurye".

In 1578, during a progress through East Anglia, the Queen stayed at the manor house Hawstead Place at Hawstead which Elizabeth Stafford's husband, Sir Sir William Drury, had recently rebuilt. According to Thomas Churchyard, ‘a costly and delicat dinner’ was put on for the occasion, and tradition has it that during the visit the Queen dropped a silver-handled fan into the moat.

Both Lady Drury and her husband exchanged New Year's gifts with the Queen in 1579, Sir William's gift being a pair of black velvet mittens, while Lady Drury's gift was an embroidered forepart of cloth of silver.

In 1587 Sir William Drury was appointed a receiver for the Exchequer in Essex, Hertfordshire and Middlesex, but fled to the continent in July of that year owing the Exchequer £5000. How Drury incurred the debt is unclear. By 1588, through the influence of Lord Willoughby, then in command of English forces in the Low Countries, Drury was appointed Governor of Bergen-op-Zoom in the Netherlands, but was replaced by Thomas Morgan. Drury was then sent as colonel over 1000 men under Lord Willoughby to the assistance of Henry IV of France. En route he quarrelled with Sir John Borough over precedence, and a duel ensued in which Drury sustained an injury to his arm, and first lost his hand to gangrene and then his arm by amputation. He died soon afterwards. Drury's body was brought back to England, and he was buried in the chancel of Hawstead church. After his death, Dame Elizabeth (Lady) Drury received a comforting letter from the Queen, in which the Queen referred to her as 'my Bess'. Dame Elizabeth Drury continued to serve the Queen as a Lady of the Bedchamber until her death in 1599.

== Marriages and issue ==
Elizabeth Stafford married firstly Sir William Drury (d. 8 January 1590), the eldest son of Robert Drury (d. 7 December 1557), esquire, and Audrey Rich, the daughter of Richard Rich, 1st Baron Rich, Lord Chancellor of England, by whom she had two sons and four daughters:

- Sir Robert Drury (1575–1615), who married, on 30 January 1592, Anne Bacon (d. 5 June 1624), the daughter of Sir Nicholas Bacon, 1st Baronet, of Redgrave, by whom he had two daughters, Dorothy and Elizabeth, but died without living issue.
- Charles Drury, slain at Nieuwpoort in 1600.
- Frances Drury (13 June 1576 – c. 1637), who married firstly Sir Nicholas Clifford of Bobbing, Kent, and secondly, Sir William Wray, 1st Baronet, of Glentworth (1555–1617).
- Elizabeth Drury (born 4 January 1578) who married William Cecil, 2nd Earl of Exeter 1566–1640, by whom she had issue.
- Diana Drury (d. 1631), who married, in February 1618, as his second wife, Edward Cecil, 1st Viscount Wimbledon (1572–1638).
- Susanna Drury, who died unmarried in 1607.

After the death of Sir William Drury, Elizabeth Stafford married secondly, c. 1591, Sir John Scott (d. 1616), with whom she had no children.

== Death ==
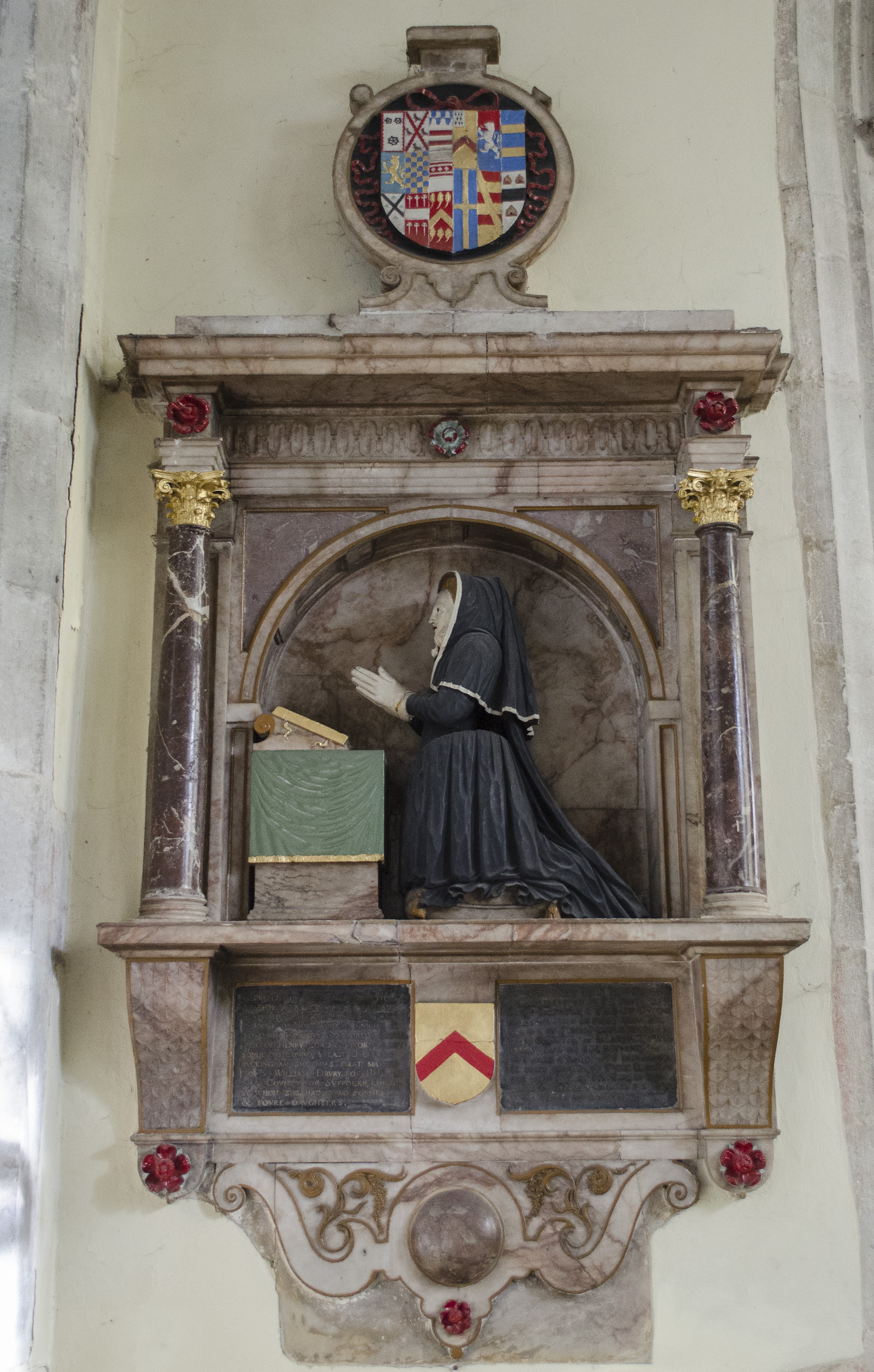
Memorial to Elizabeth Stafford, St Mary's Church, Nettlestead

She died on 6 February 1599 and was buried in St Mary's Church, Nettlestead, where there is a mural monument dedicated to her.
