= Thomas Gery Cullum =

English medical doctor (1741–1831)

Thomas Gery Cullum FSA
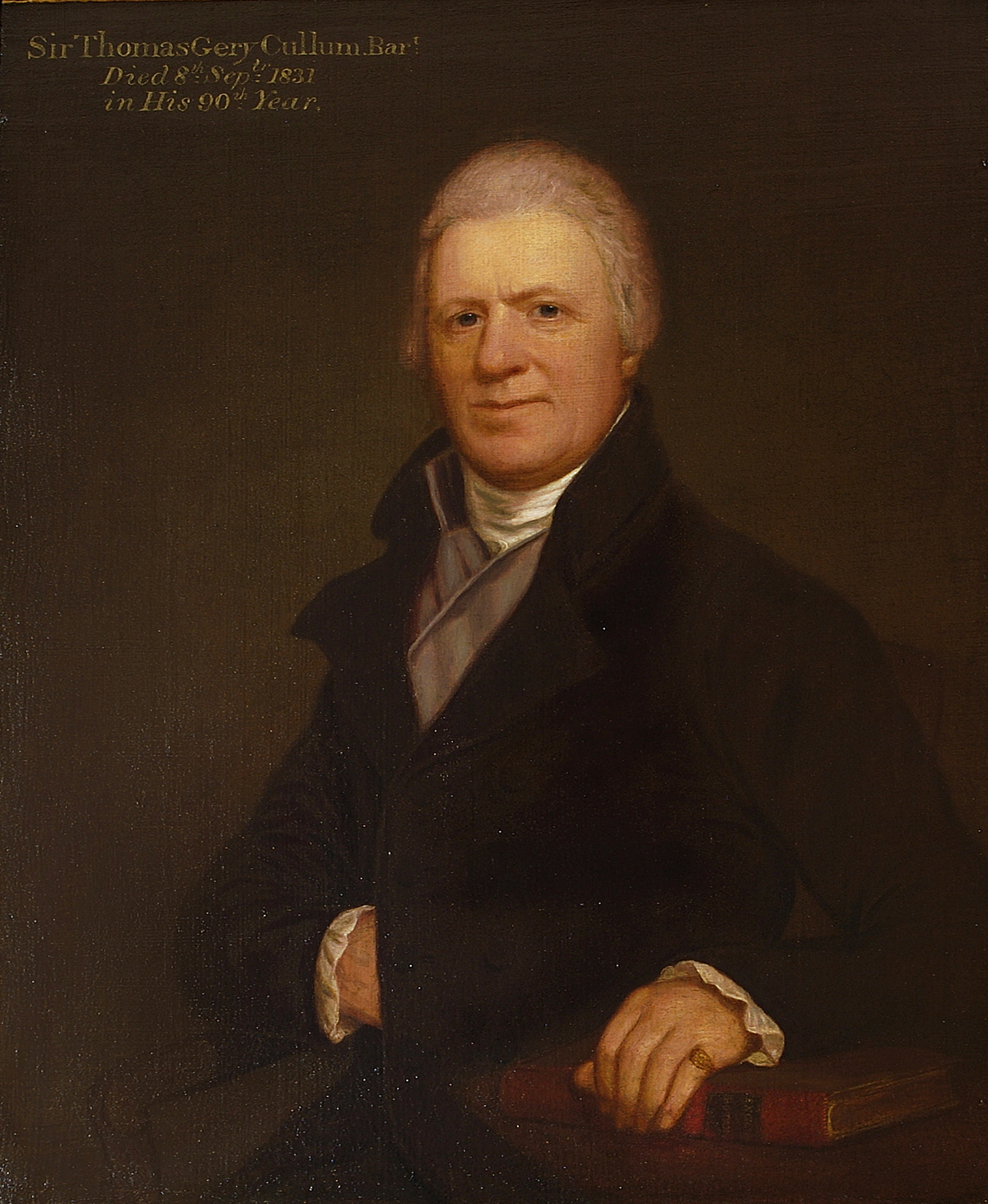
- Sir Thomas Gery Cullum
- Born: 30 November 1741
- Died: 8 September 1831 (aged 89)
- Burial place: church at Hawstead, Suffolk
- Other names: Sir Thomas Gery Cullum, 7th Baronet
- Education: London Charterhouse, Trinity College, Cambridge
- Occupation: medical doctor
- Known for: Fellow of the Royal Society, the Society of Antiquaries of London, the Linnaean Society
- Father: Sir John Cullum, 5th Baronet, of Hardwick House (Suffolk)
- Relatives: Sir John Cullum, 6th Baronet (brother)

Sir Thomas Gery Cullum, 7th Baronet FSA (30 November 1741 – 8 September 1831) was a medical doctor educated at London Charterhouse and Trinity College, Cambridge, and who later practised surgery at Bury St. Edmunds, Suffolk, where he served as an alderman and Deputy Lieutenant for Suffolk.

== Life ==
He was the son of Sir John Cullum, 5th Baronet, of Hardwick House, Hardwick, Suffolk. Sir John Cullum, 6th Baronet (1733–1785), his brother, was known as the "historian of Hawstead". H

Thomas Gery Cullum became 7th Baronet in 1785. He was a well-regarded writer on science and on botany and became a Fellow of the Royal Society, of the Society of Antiquaries of London and of the Linnaean Society. He was recommended as a Fellow of the Royal Society in January 1787 along with James Smithson. Cullum also served as Bath King of Arms from 1771 to 1800. He was succeeded as Bath King of Arms by his son John Palmer Cullum, Esq, who served from 1800–1829: the pair served for nearly 60 years.

Cullum is buried in the church at Hawstead, Suffolk with many of his ancestors and descendants. Few churches in Suffolk have as many monuments to their dead, say scholars, as the church in Hawstead.

== Residence ==
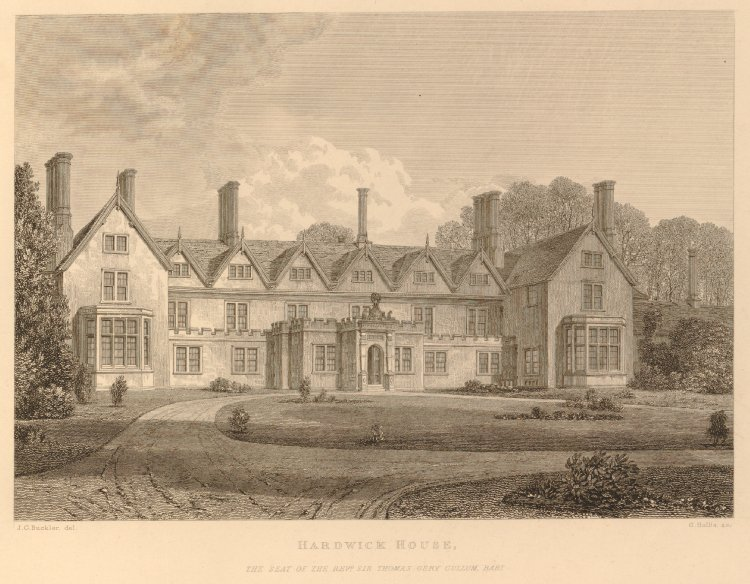
Antiquarian impression of Hardwick House, residence of Sir Thomas Gery Cullum, 7th Baronet

Cullum lived at Hardwick House, a Jacobean house on the site of medieval grazing land for St. Edmundsbury Abbey, which the Cullum family had owned from its initial purchase in 1656, by the Royalist Sir Thomas Cullum, 1st Baronet and former Sheriff of London, until 1921. Native of Suffolk, the 1st Baronet had grown rich as a London draper, then fallen out of favour on Cromwell's rise, but returned to favour on the Restoration, when he was rewarded with a Baronetcy.

The Cullum family had an extensive library, and had also taken great interest in the history of the area, including having authored several volumes on the history and antiquities of Hawsted and Hardwick. Following the sale of the Hardwick Estate, most of the Cullum library, the Cullum Collection, was given to the Bury Record Office. An oil portrait descended in the Levett family of Sir Thomas Gargrave, Speaker of the House of Commons, was donated to the National Portrait Gallery in London by the last Cullum baronet.

The house, which included a Venetian indoor riding school and extensive grounds, was demolished in 1921 when the last of the Cullums, George Gery Milner-Gibson Cullum, grandson of the 8th Baronet and High Sheriff of Suffolk, died without heirs.

The grounds and site of the formal gardens and statuary today constitute Hardwick Heath (55 acres (22 ha) of the former Cullum estate turned into public parkland), the West Suffolk Hospital, the grounds of Hardwick Manor and housing developments. The site of Hardwick House itself is a wood bordering some original Cedar and Yew trees.

== Legacy ==
Sir James Edward Smith dedicated his English Flora of 1824 to Cullum thus:

"To Sir Thomas Gery Cullum, Bart., whose knowledge and love of natural science entitle him to the respect of all who follow the same pursuit, this work is inscribed in grateful and affectionate remembrance by the Author."

Smith's publications had followed a privately printed flora by Cullum, Floræ Anglicæ Specimen imperfectum et ineditum, 1774, which was based on the Linnean system of classification

A genus of flowering plant, Cullumia, commemorates the contribution of Cullum and his brother.

== Family ==
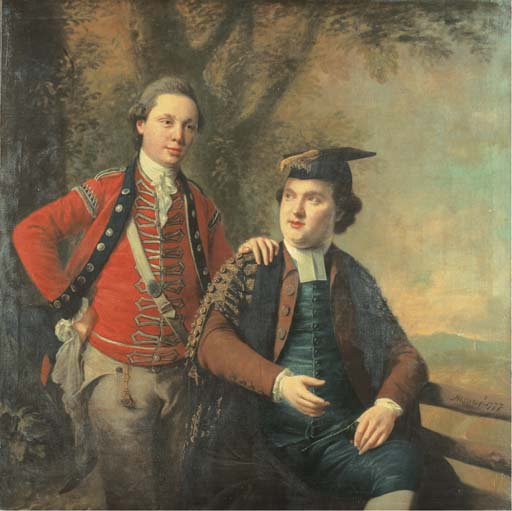
Sir Levett Hanson, brother-in-law of Sir Thomas Gery Cullum, and General Richard Wilford in portrait by artist Nathaniel Hone, R.A., 1777

Cullum married Mary Hanson of Normanton, West Yorkshire, daughter of Robert Hanson Esq. and heiress of her brother Levett Hanson, chamberlain to the Duke of Modena. On his death in Copenhagen without an heir, Hanson left his estate, including portraits and mementoes of the Levett and Gargrave families of Yorkshire, to his sister.

== See also ==
- List of Old Carthusians
- Hardwick House (Suffolk)
- Lady Drury's Closet

Heraldic offices
Preceded by Samuel Horsey	King of Arms of the Order of the Bath; 1771–1800	Succeeded by John Palmer Cullum
Baronetage of England
Preceded by John Cullum	Baronet (of Hastede); 1785–1831	Succeeded by Thomas Gery Cullum
