= Robert Drury (17th century MP) =

Sir Robert Drury (January 1575 – 1615), of Hawstead, Suffolk, and Drury House, Westminster, was an English Member of Parliament (MP).

Robert was the first son of William Drury and his wife, Elizabeth Stafford, the daughter of the courtier Sir William Stafford.

He was a Member of the Parliament of England for Suffolk in 1604 and for Eye in 1614. However following his father's death from wounds received in a duel in 1590, the family still had debts amounting to £3,000 owed to the crown. Although his mother bought his wardship for £166 13s 4d, but had to relinquish it when William Drury's estate was confiscated. Robert's wardship was regranted to John Puckering. In 1591 Robert distinguished himself during the Siege of Rouen, and was knighted by Robert Devereux, 2nd Earl of Essex at the age of 16. Four months later on 30 January 1592, his sixteenth birthday, he married Anne Bacon the daughter of Sir Nicholas Bacon, 1st Baronet, of Redgrave. Sir Nicholas Bacon then agreed paid off the debt in return for a lease of the Hawstead estate. William's mother had remarried Sir John Scott with whom she bought back the wardship of Robert from Puckering.

In 1606, Drury was a defender of Opinion against Truth in the Barriers at a Marriage at the wedding of Frances Howard and the Earl of Essex. According to Henry Wotton, Robert Drury practiced "running at the ring" and displayed his dressage skills by curvetting his horse in view of King James' window in May 1613. Drury's efforts were intended to secure his appointment as ambassador at Brussels.
