= Nathaniel Bacon (painter) =

English painter, landowner and horticulturist (1585–1627)

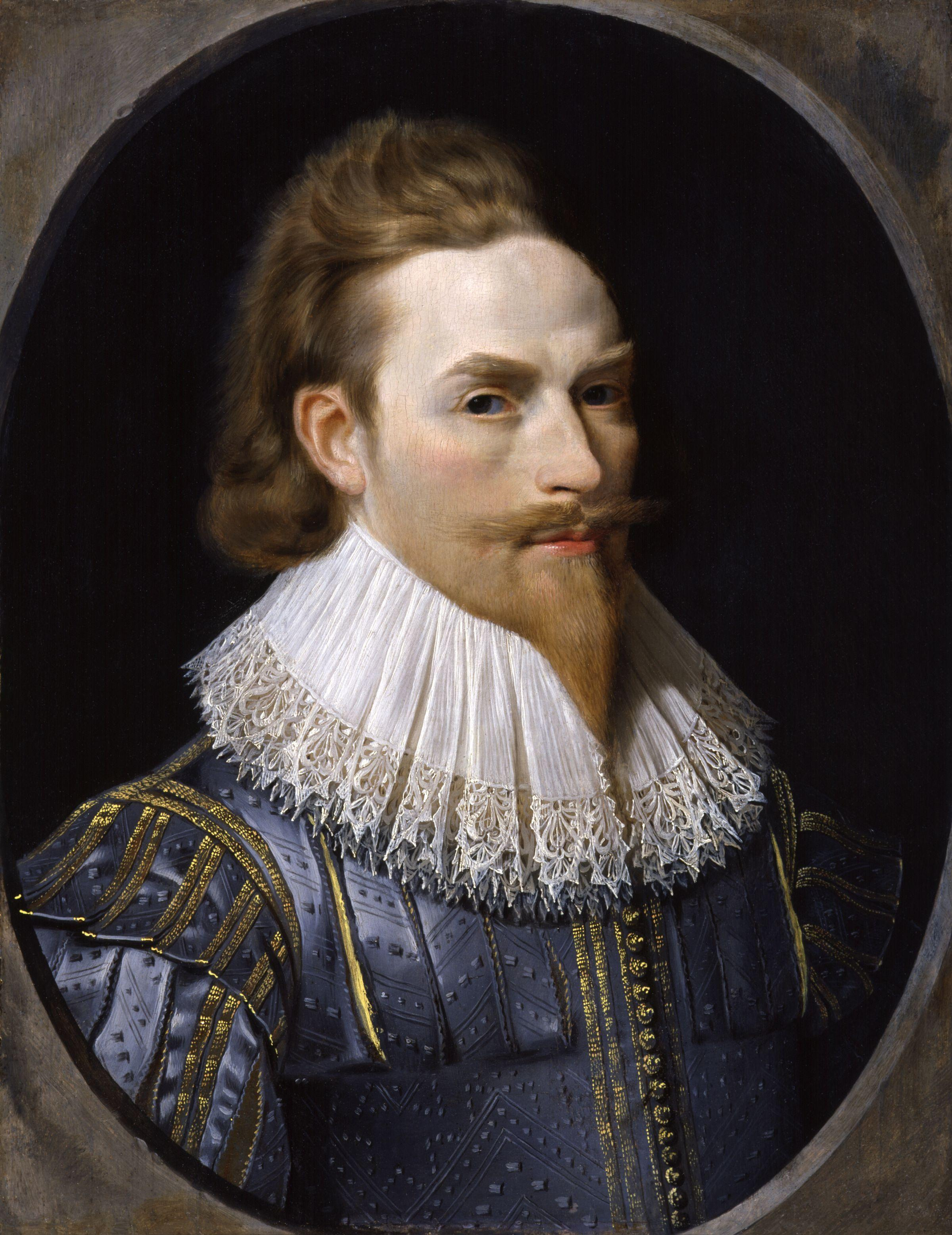
A self-portrait of Bacon

Sir Nathaniel Bacon, KB (1585 – 1627) was an English painter, landowner and horticulturist from Culford, Suffolk.

== Art ==
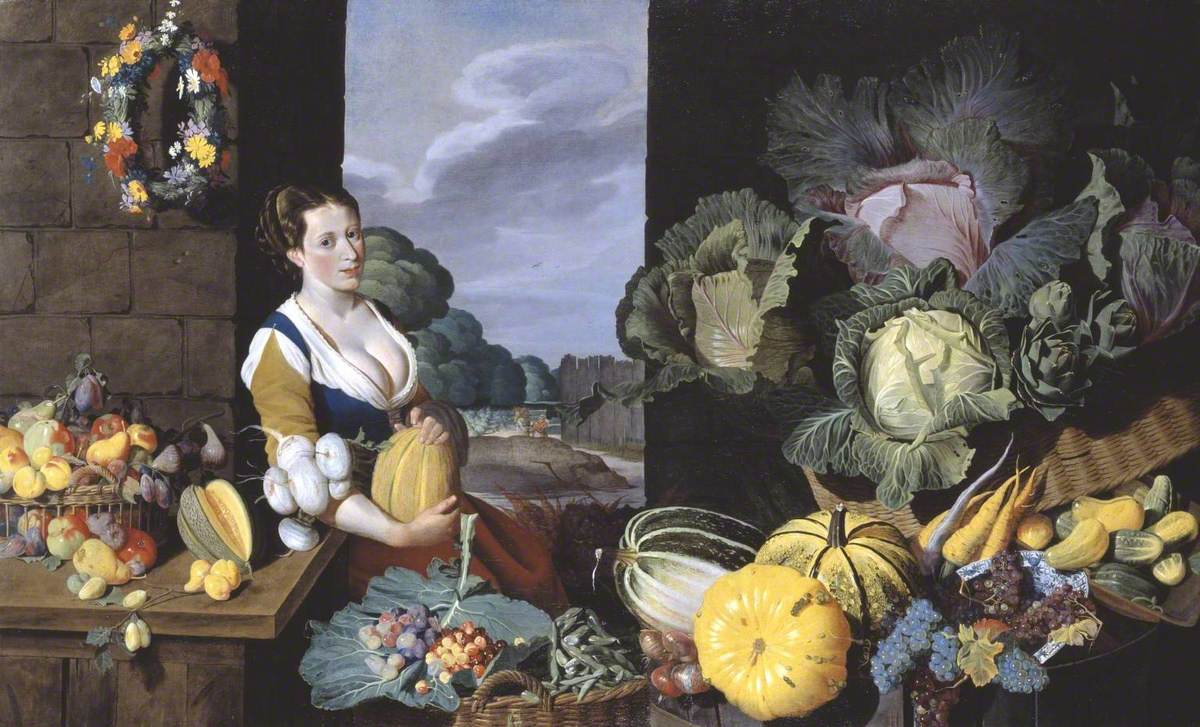
Cookmaid with Still Life of Vegetables and Fruit, by Nathaniel Bacon

Bacon was particularly known for his kitchen and market scenes, dominated by still-life depictions of large vegetables and fruit, often accompanied by a buxom maid(identity of such unknown), the most well known being "The Cookmaid with Still Life of Vegetables and Fruit" (Tate Gallery London). This predilection for cook or market scenes is much more common among Dutch and Flemish painters, see for example Joachim Beuckelaer, or from a later generation, Pieter Cornelisz van Rijck, and Cornelis Jacobsz Delff. Only nine of Bacon's paintings were thought to survive until a portrait in Government House, Sydney was identified as a portrait of his wife, Jane, Lady Cornwallis.

Bacon is credited with the first known British landscape, and also painted several self-portraits and a number of other portraits. He was created a Knight of the Bath in 1625, in honour of the Coronation of Charles I.

== Personal life ==
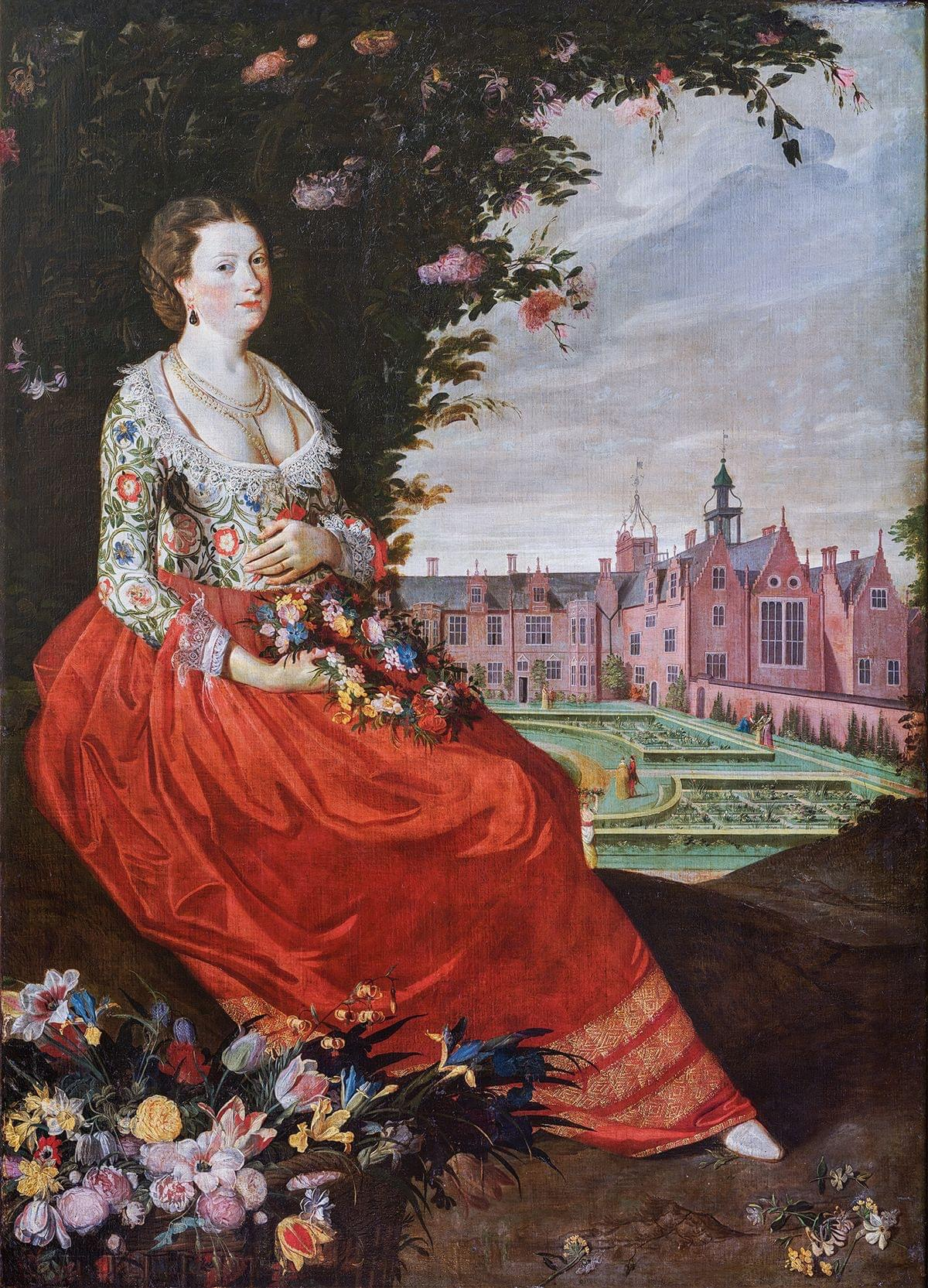
Attributed to Nathaniel Bacon, The artist's wife, Jane Bacon, Lady Cornwallis, née Meautys, ca. 1614-1617

He was the youngest son of Sir Nicholas Bacon, 1st Baronet, of Redgrave, who was the eldest half-brother of the leading politician and philosopher Francis Bacon (Lord Verulam), and so with connections to the political elite of late Elizabethan England.

In 1613 or 1614, Bacon married Jane Cornwallis (née Meautys), the widow of Sir William Cornwallis, and mother of Frederick Cornwallis, 1st Baron Cornwallis.

Bacon was created a Knight of the Bath early in 1626, on the coronation of Charles I. He died at age 42, probably from tuberculosis, and was buried on 1 July 1627 at Culford Hall (now rebuilt and renamed as Culford Park). Their daughter, Jane, aged three years, died that same October, and is buried alongside her father. The entries of their burials follow each other in the Culford Parish Burial Register. Their other daughter, Anne, married Sir Thomas Meautys in 1639.

Anne, Lady Drury, was his sister, and it is believed he may have had some influence on the remarkable series of small paintings which make up Lady Drury's Closet.

Bacon is commemorated at St Mary's Church, Culford with a monument by the sculptor Nicholas Stone. In June 1628 Bacon's brother Sir Edmund Bacon saw it being made at Stone's workshop in London's Long Acre, and noted "My brother's monument goes well forward, I saw it so much as is done, the day before I came own of town".
