= John Cullum (disambiguation) =

John Cullum (born 1930) is an American actor and singer.

John Cullum may also refer to:

- JD Cullum (born 1966), American actor
- Sir John Cullum, 5th Baronet (1699–1774), of the Cullum baronets
- Sir John Cullum, 6th Baronet (1733–1785), of the Cullum baronets
