= Cullum baronets =

Extinct baronetcy in the Baronetage of England

- Escutcheon of the Cullum baronets of Hastede
- Creation date: 1660
- Status: extinct
- Extinction date: 1855
- Motto: Sustineatur, Let it be sustained
- Arms: azure, a chevron ermine between three pelicans vulning their breasts or

The Cullum baronetcy, of Hastede in Suffolk, was created in the Baronetage of England on 18 June 1660 for Thomas Cullum. It became extinct on the death of the eighth Baronet, 26 January 1855. The family estate was Hardwick House, Suffolk.

== Cullum baronets, of Hastede ==
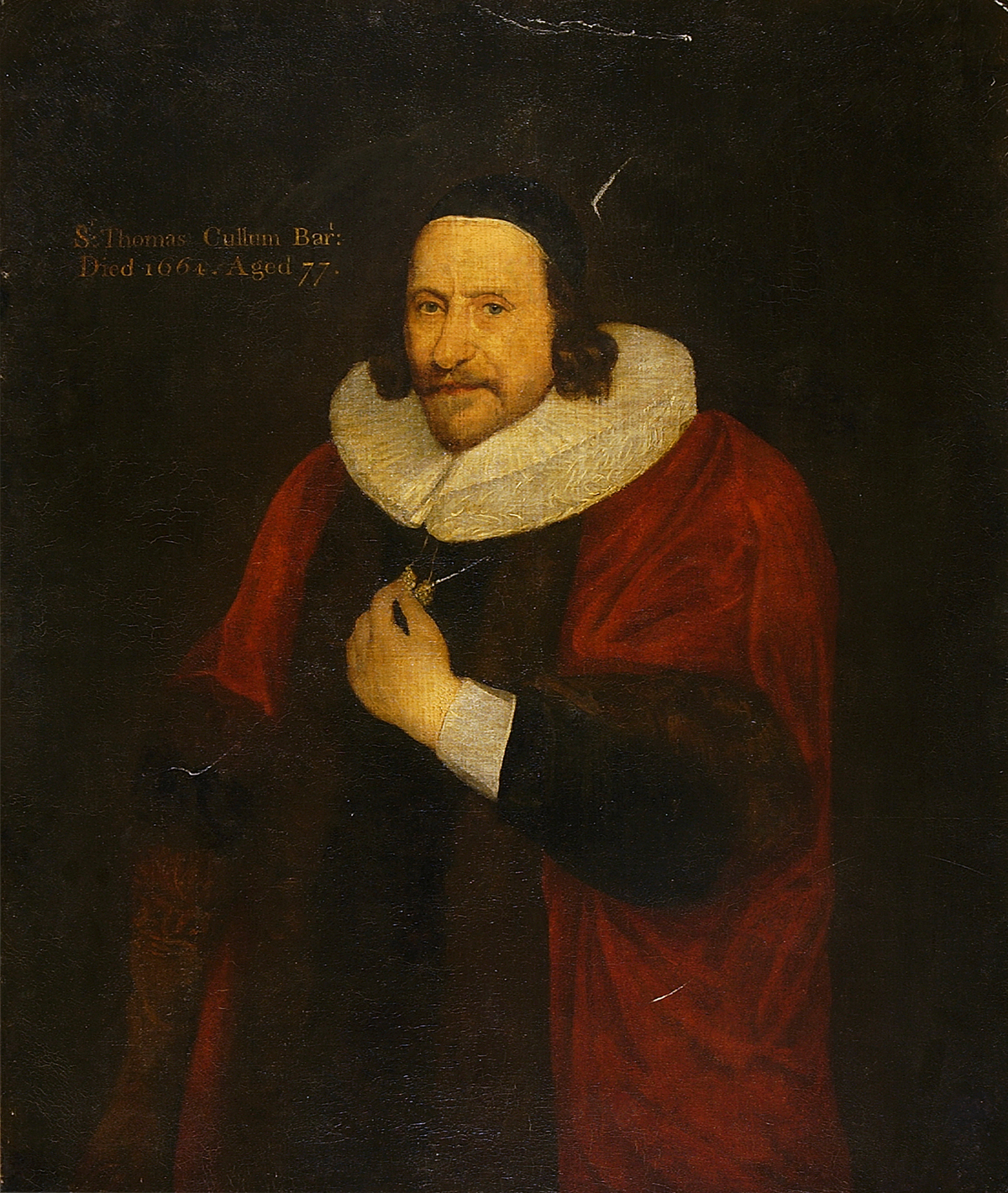
Sir Thomas Cullum, 1st Baronet. London draper, alderman and sheriff of the City of London

- Sir Thomas Cullum, 1st Baronet (circa 1587 – 6 April 1664)
- Sir Thomas Cullum, 2nd Baronet (26 December 1628 – 16 October 1680)
- Sir Dudley Cullum, 3rd Baronet (17 September 1657 – 16 September 1720)
- Sir Jasper Cullum, 4th Baronet (6 August 1674 – 4 November 1754)
- Sir John Cullum, 5th Baronet (7 May 1699 – 16 January 1774)
- Sir John Cullum, 6th Baronet (21 June 1733 – 9 October 1785)
- Sir Thomas Gery Cullum, 7th Baronet (30 November 1741 – 8 September 1831)
- Sir Thomas Gery Cullum, 8th Baronet (23 October 1777 – 26 January 1855)

== See also ==
- Culme of Molland-Champson and Canonsleigh, Devon
