= Sir John Cullum, 6th Baronet =

English priest

Sir John Cullum, Bt
- Baronet of Hawsted and Hardwick, Suffolk
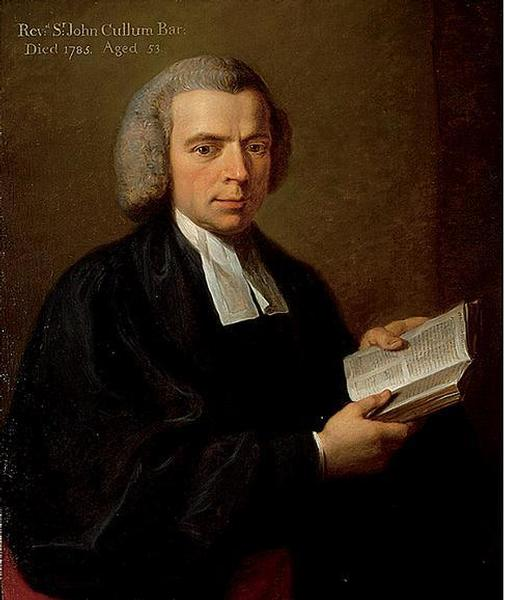
- Sir John Cullum, portrait by Angelica Kauffman
- Known for: Fellow of the Royal Society; Fellow of the Society of Antiquaries of London
- Born: 21 June 1733; Hawstead
- Died: 9 October 1785 (aged 52)
- Spouse: Peggy Bisson

Sir John Cullum, 6th Baronet (21 June 1733 – 9 October 1785) was an English clergyman and antiquary.

== Life ==
The eldest son of Sir John Cullum, 5th Baronet of Hawstead and Hardwick, Suffolk, by Susanna, daughter and coheiress of Sir Thomas Gery, he was born at Hawstead 21 June 1733 and baptised in the chapel at Hawstead Place on 19 July. He was educated at King Edward VI's School, Bury St. Edmunds. He went to Catharine Hall, Cambridge and in January 1756 was fourth junior optime in the Mathematical Tripos. His classics, however, were stronger and in 1758 he obtained the member's prize for the best dissertation in Latin prose. He was elected Fellow of his college and was only just defeated in an election for the mastership.

In April 1762, he was presented by his father to the rectory of Hawstead and in December 1774, he was instituted to the vicarage of Great Thurlow, also Suffolk. In the same year, he succeeded his father as the sixth baronet.

Cullum was a scholar, antiquary and student of natural science. In March 1774 he was elected a Fellow of the Society of Antiquaries of London and in March 1775 a Fellow of the Royal Society. Cullum died of consumption on 9 October 1785 and was buried at Hawstead.

== Works ==
Cullum's diaries and correspondence survived at Hardwick House in Bury St. Edmunds, and elsewhere. Among his circle were the Duchess of Portland, Mary Delany, Richard Gough who began his Sepulchral Monuments at Cullum's prompting, Michael Lort, Peter Sandford, Thomas Pennant, James Granger, George Ashby, Michael Tyson, John Lightfoot, and William Cole.

Cullum devoted time to the preparation of The History and Antiquities of Hawsted and Hardwick in the County of Suffolk, published in No. xxiii. (1784) of Bibliotheca Topographica Britannica, and subsequently in separate form. He made collections for a History of Suffolk, and projected a new Flora Anglicana, but neither were published.

== Family ==
Cullum married at West Ham, Essex, 11 July 1765, Peggy, only daughter of Daniel Bisson distiller of Three Mills, who died in August 1810.

Baronetage of England
Preceded by John Cullum	Baronet (of Hastede); 1774 – 1785	Succeeded by Thomas Gery Cullum
