= Jane Cornwallis =

English courtier (1581–1659)

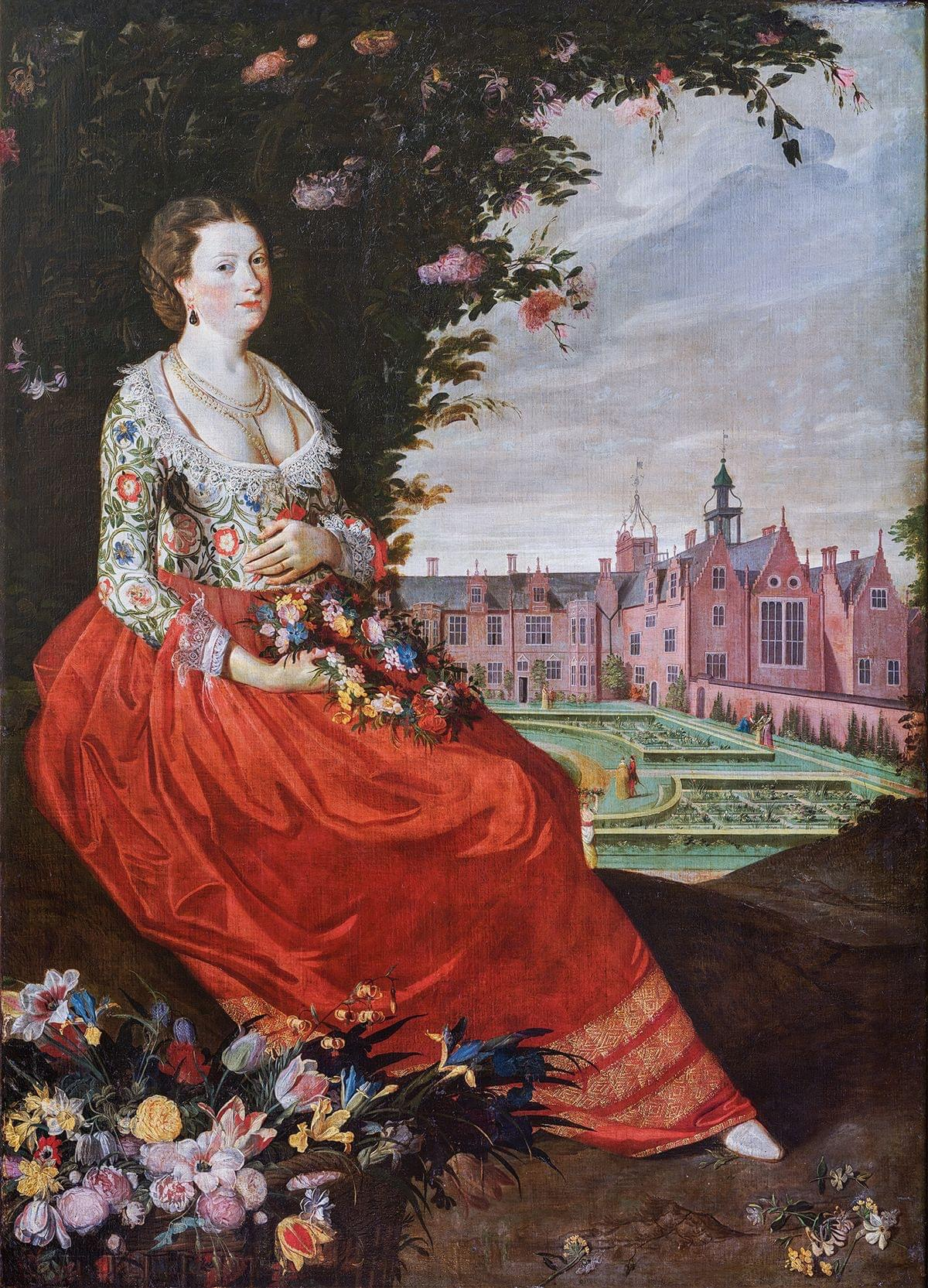
Attributed to Nathaniel Bacon, The artist’s wife, Jane Bacon, Lady Cornwallis, née Meautys, ca. 1614-1617

Jane, Lady Cornwallis, later Lady Bacon (née Meautys; 1581–1659), was an English courtier and letter writer, whose correspondence was published (in 1842 in London, 8vo, and in 2003).

Jane Meautys was the daughter of Hercules Meautys of West Ham, and Philippe Cooke, daughter of Richard Cooke of Gidea Hall.

== Jane, Lady Cornwallis ==
She was made a lady of the bedchamber to Anne of Denmark. This appointment was probably secured by Lucy Russell, Countess of Bedford. John Chamberlain wrote that she was a servant of the Countess, describing her as "Mistris Mewtas that waites on the Lady of Bedford".

Rumour connected her Deering an usher to the Lord Treasurer, and with "young Garret". Garret or Garrard was relation of Dudley Carelton's wife Anne Gerrard.

In 1609, she married Sir William Cornwallis of Brome, Suffolk, over thirty years her senior. King James gave her a jewel provided by George Heriot worth £60. William Cornwallis died in 1611. Their only son, born in March 1611, Frederick, would later be created the first Baron Cornwallis.

In 1609 a fellow courtier in the queen's household, and cousin of the Countess of Bedford, Bridget Markham, bequeathed her a set of diamond and ruby buttons. Anne of Denmark gave her a jewel of gold with diamonds, supplied by George Heriot, at her wedding, and gifts of four elaborate gowns in the following years.

== Jane, Lady Bacon ==
On 1 May 1614, she married Nathaniel Bacon, of Culford, Suffolk, seventh (or ninth) son of Sir Nathaniel Bacon of Culford and Redgrave, High Sheriff of Norfolk and Suffolk. As the widow of a knight, she continued to be addressed by her title of "Lady Cornwallis" until Bacon himself was made a Knight of the Bath in February, 1626.

Bacon was the nephew of the statesman and philosopher Francis Bacon, 1st Viscount St Alban, and wealthy, but took his painting very seriously, and is now mainly remembered for this. He died at only forty-two in 1627. The couple lived at Brome Hall in Suffolk (demolished in 1958), a Cornwallis property that Lady Cornwallis held in trust for her minor son, Frederick.

By 1618, the Countess of Bedford became interested in collecting early Tudor art. She believed that portraits by Hans Holbein the Younger could be found in country houses, and she wrote to Lady Jane Cornwallis, hoping that her father-in-law, Nicholas Bacon of Redgrave might have such pictures. She would pay handsomely, and offered to have faithful copies made as substitutes for the originals. Thomas Howard, 14th Earl of Arundel was a competitor for old paintings. It is not clear from the letters if any old portraits changed hands.

Jane's son by her first marriage, Frederick Cornwallis, married Elizabeth Ashburnham, daughter of Sir John Ashburnham and Elizabeth Villiers, at court in January 1631. His mother did not attend because she was offended by some misdemeanour of his. Ashburnham's cousin, Susan Feilding, Countess of Denbigh, wrote to Bacon mentioning "her family be unfortunate", meaning their financial difficulty since her father's death in 1620.

Dorothy Randolph, a close friend and Meautys family cousin, had helped to arrange Frederick's marriage by searching for suitable partners. Randolph also sent news from London, and (much quoted) fashion advice for spring 1632;

"I have sent you some patterns of stuff such as is worn by many, but not much lace upon those wrought stuffs; but the newest fashion is plain satin, of what colour one will, emboidered all over with 'alcomedes' (jewels and stones), but it is not like to hold past summer. They wear white satin waistcoats, plain, raised, printed, and some embroidered with lace, more than any one thing, and white Holland (linen) ones much".

In 1639 her daughter Anne Bacon married Thomas Meautys, despite the efforts of Philip Wodehouse who wrote poems to her. Anne later married Harbottle Grimston. Another daughter Jane Bacon died young. She was the grandmother Charles Cornwallis, 2nd Baron Cornwallis.

Jane, Lady Bacon died at Culford on 8 May 1659. In 1657 she had contracted with Thomas Stanton at St Andrew Holborn for her marble monument at Culford, agreeing the design with a drawing.

A painting in Government House, Sydney was recently identified as a portrait of Jane Cornwallis, attributed to her husband Nathaniel Bacon. The garden front of Brome Hall appears in the background of the painting. Rather remarkably, the painting had previously been attributed to Angelica Kauffman, who was painting some 150 years later. She wears a bodice embroidered with flowers, and holds a floral wreath. The portrait appears to celebrate her pregnancy.
