= Sir Robert Bacon, 3rd Baronet =

English politician

Arms of Bacon: Gules, on a chief argent two mullets pierced sable

Sir Robert Bacon, 3rd Baronet of Redgrave (1574–1655) was an English landowner.

== Life ==
He was born on 4 May 1574 at Redgrave Manor, Suffolk, the fifth son of Sir Nicholas Bacon, 1st Baronet and his wife Anne Butts, daughter of Edmund Butts. He spent most of his life residing in Riborough in Norfolk.

In 1649, Robert Bacon succeeded his older brother Edmund as baronet. Bacon was buried at Ryburgh in Norfolk

Robert Bacon died on 16 December 1655, at Ryburgh, Norfolk. He was succeeded in the baronetcy by Edmund, a son of his seventh son.

== Family ==
Bacon was married twice. He had nine sons and three daughters by his first wife, Anne Peyton, daughter of Sir John Peyton, 1st Baronet, of Cambridge. Among his sons were Nathaniel, Edmund, Henry, Francis, and Drury, all of whom died young. The other sons were Nicholas, Hobart, and Robert. Nicholas married Margaret, and Robert married Catherine.

Baronetage of England
Preceded by Edmund Bacon	Baronet (of Redgrave); 1649–1655	Succeeded by Edmund Bacon
