= William Drury (MP for Suffolk) =

Member of the Parliament of England

Sir William Drury
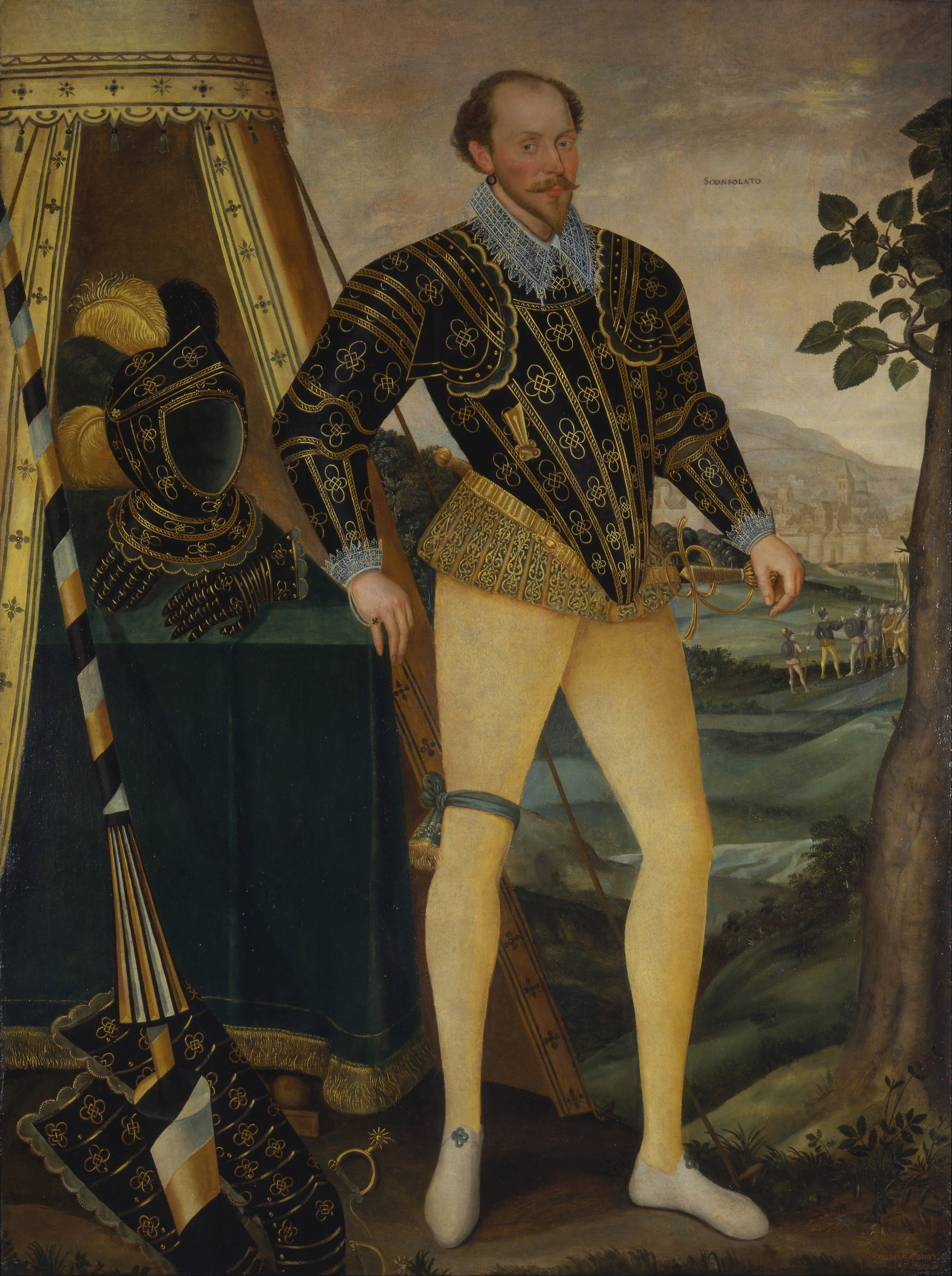
- Sir William Drury of Hawstead, Suffolk, 1587.
- Born: 8 March 1550
- Died: 1590 (aged 39–40)
- Spouse: Elizabeth Stafford
- Children: Sir Robert Drury; Charles Drury; Frances Drury; Elizabeth Drury; Diana Drury; Susanna Drury
- Parents: Robert Drury; Audrey Rich

Sir William Drury (8 March 1550 – 1590) was an English landowner and member of parliament. He was the father of Sir Robert Drury, patron of the poet John Donne.

== Family ==
William Drury, born 8 March 1550, was the eldest son of Robert Drury (d. 7 December 1557), esquire, and Audrey Rich, the daughter of Richard Rich, 1st Baron Rich, Lord Chancellor of England. His paternal grandparents were William Drury (d. 1558) and Elizabeth (d. 19 May 1575), daughter and co-heiress of Henry Sothel, Esquire, Attorney General to Henry VII of Stoke Faston, Leicestershire, and Joan Empson, daughter of Sir Richard Empson.

Sir William Drury had three brothers and eight sisters:

- Henry Drury, who died without issue.
- Thomas Drury (born 8 May 1551).
- Robert Drury, who died an infant.
- Anne Drury, who married John Thornton of Soham, Cambridgeshire.
- Mary Drury (born 14 February 1546), who married Robert Russell of West Rudham, Norfolk.
- Elizabeth Drury (born 8 February 1547), who married firstly, Thomas Grey of Merton, Norfolk, and secondly, Nicholas Mynne of Walsingham, Norfolk.
- Susan Drury (born 4 April 1549), who married Robert Baspole.
- Winifred Drury (born 27 August 1552), who married Edmund Markhant or Marchant or Markham of Colchester, Essex.
- Bridget Drury, who married Richard Zouche of Pitton, Wiltshire.
- Dorothy Drury, who married, on 26 August 1577, Edward Barnes of Soham, Cambridgeshire.
- Audrey or Etheldred Drury, who married 28 December 1587, George Parker.

== Career ==
Drury was educated at Groton school and Caius College, Cambridge. He probably entered Lincoln's Inn in 1569. He succeeded his father, Robert, in 1557 and his grandfather, Sir William Drury, in 1558, inheriting considerable land in Suffolk, including Hawstead Place, where in 1578 he entertained Queen Elizabeth I. He was knighted around the same time.

In 1581 he was elected MP for Castle Rising, Norfolk, in a by-election caused by the illness of Edward Flowerdew. His return was challenged at the beginning of the session but confirmed by Parliament. In 1584 he was elected knight of the shire (MP) for Suffolk, sitting until 1586.

Drury was a Justice of the Peace from about 1577, and was appointed High Sheriff of Suffolk for 1582. He became an Exchequer receiver for Essex, Hertfordshire, Middlesex and London in 1587, but had to flee to the continent when owing the Exchequer £5000. By 1588, through the influence of Lord Willoughby, then in command of English forces in the Low Countries, Drury had been appointed Governor of Bergen-op-Zoom in the Netherlands, which was threatened by the Spanish. After being replaced as Governor by Thomas Morgan, a more experienced soldier, he was sent as colonel over 1000 men under Lord Willoughby to the assistance of Henry IV of France. En route he quarreled with Sir John Burgh over precedency,. and a duel ensued in which Drury sustained a serious injury to his arm, losing first his hand to gangrene and then his arm by amputation. He died soon afterwards.

At his death, in 1590, Drury still owed the crown £3000. Much of his land was sold to pay the debt, all but £600 of which was eventually paid. He was buried at Hawstead, where a marble bust over his tomb depicts him in full armour. Drury had made his last will on 1 July 1587 prior to leaving England. It was proved on 4 June 1595.

== Marriage and issue ==
Drury married Elizabeth Stafford, the daughter of Sir William Stafford of Chebsey, Staffordshire, and Dorothy Stafford, by whom he had two sons and four daughters:

- Sir Robert Drury (1575–1615), who married, on 30 January 1592, Anne Bacon (d. 5 June 1624), the daughter of Sir Nicholas Bacon, 1st Baronet, of Redgrave, by whom he had two daughters, Dorothy and Elizabeth, but died without living issue.
- Charles Drury, slain at Nieuwpoort in 1600.
- Frances Drury (13 June 1576 – c. 1637), who married firstly Sir Nicholas Clifford of Bobbing, Kent, and secondly, Sir William Wray, 1st Baronet, of Glentworth (1555–1617).
- Elizabeth Drury (born 4 January 1578) who married William Cecil, 2nd Earl of Exeter 1566–1640, by whom she had issue.
- Diana Drury, born 15 July 1580 (d. 1631), who married, in February 1618, as his second wife, Edward Cecil, 1st Viscount Wimbledon (1572–1638).
- Susanna Drury, who died unmarried in 1607

His widow subsequently married, in about 1591, Sir John Scott (d. 1616), of Scot's Hall.
