= Thomas Wilson (record keeper) =

Sir Thomas Wilson (1560?–1629) was an English official. He is known as a government agent, Member of Parliament, Keeper of the Records, translator and author.

== Life ==
Born probably about 1560, Wilson was educated apparently at Stamford School, and matriculated at St John's College, Cambridge, on 26 November 1575. In 1583 he was elected on Lord Burghley's nomination to a scholarship there. He graduated B.A. in 1583 at St. John's, then migrated to Trinity Hall, where he graduated M.A. in 1587. For fifteen years, according to his own account, he studied civil law at Cambridge. In 1594 he obtained a letter from Burghley recommending his election as Fellow of Trinity Hall. The recommendation was unsuccessful, and Wilson turned to travel.

In 1596, Wilson was in Italy and Germany. He remained faithful to the Cecils, and during the later years of Elizabeth's reign he was employed as a foreign intelligencer. In December 1601 he was at Florence, on negotiations with the Duke of Ferrara, the Venetians, and other Italian states. The main object of his residence in Italy during 1601–2 was to discover Spanish and papal plans against England. He returned to England during the winter, and was at Greenwich on 12 June 1603; and then early in 1604 was sent to reside as consul in Spain. He was at Bayonne in February 1603–4, and remained in Spain until the arrival of the Earl of Nottingham and Sir Charles Cornwallis as ambassadors in 1605.

On his return to England, Wilson entered the service of Sir Robert Cecil, who leased to him a house adjoining his own, "Britain's Burse", in Durham Place, Strand, London. He worked on supervising the building of Salisbury's house in Durham Place and also at Hatfield, near which he received from Cecil, now Lord Salisbury, the manor of Hoddesdon. In 1605 he was returned to parliament for Newtown, Isle of Wight; he took notes of its proceedings on matters including scutages and the "post-nati" for the government. He also kept the minutes of the proceedings of the committee for the Union of England and Scotland, and made a collection of the objections likely to be urged against the union in parliament.

About 1606, when Sir Thomas Lake stepped down, Salisbury (as Cecil had become) obtained for Wilson the post of Keeper of the Records at Whitehall Palace. He also obtained the clerkship of imports, but lost it when Thomas Howard, 1st Earl of Suffolk became treasurer in 1614. As Keeper of the Records, Wilson's main difficulty was with secretaries of state and other officials, who refused to deliver to him public documents to which he considered the state entitled; and with highly placed borrowers who failed to return documents. Among the latter was Sir Robert Bruce Cotton, and in 1615 Wilson protested against Cotton's appointment as Keeper of the Exchequer Records, fearing that records would find their way into Cotton's private collection. When Ralph Starkey acquired the papers of Secretary William Davison, Wilson procured a warrant for their seizure, and on 14 August 1619 secured a sackful, containing forty-five bundles of manuscripts.

Wilson was an original subscriber to the Virginia Company, and followed discoveries in the East Indies. He petitioned for a grant of 2000 acres in Ulster in 1618, and drew up a scheme for the military government of Ireland. He vainly petitioned the king to be made Master of Requests, and attempted unsuccessfully to become Master of a Cambridge college.

Wilson was knighted at Whitehall on 20 July 1618, and in September of that was selected to interrogate Walter Ralegh. After Ralegh's death Wilson urged the transference of his manuscripts to the state paper office, took his "mathematical and sea-instruments" for the Navy Board, and drew up a catalogue of his books, which he presented to the king.

Wilson was buried at St. Martin's-in-the-Fields on 17 July 1629.

== Works ==
Wilson translated from the Spanish Jorge de Montemayor's Diana, a romance, while abroad in 1596. The plot of Two Gentlemen of Verona was partly drawn from it, and the translation was dedicated to the Earl of Southampton.

Among reports Wilson wrote for Robert Cecil was one begun on 1 March 1601 "on the state of England A.D. 1600", giving the claims of twelve competitors for the crown, with financial and military information. He compiled a Collection of Divers Matters concerning the Marriages of Princes' Children, which he presented on 4 October 1617 to James I. On 10 August 1616 he sent to Lord Ellesmere a collection of commercial treaties with the Netherlands. Much of his correspondence was preserved.

== Family ==
Wilson married Margaret Meautys of Hertfordshire, aunt of Thomas Meautys the official. His only child, a daughter Dorothy, married, about 1614, Ambrose Randolph, younger son of Thomas Randolph, who was joint Keeper of the Records with Wilson from 1614. Dorothy Randolph wrote letters to Jane Cornwallis.

== Notes ==
Attribution

This article incorporates text from a publication now in the public domain: Lee, Sidney, ed. (1900). "Wilson, Thomas (1560?-1629)". Dictionary of National Biography. Vol. 62. London: Smith, Elder & Co.
