= Hardwick House, Suffolk =

Manor house in Suffolk, England

Coordinates: 52.2288°N 0.7094°E

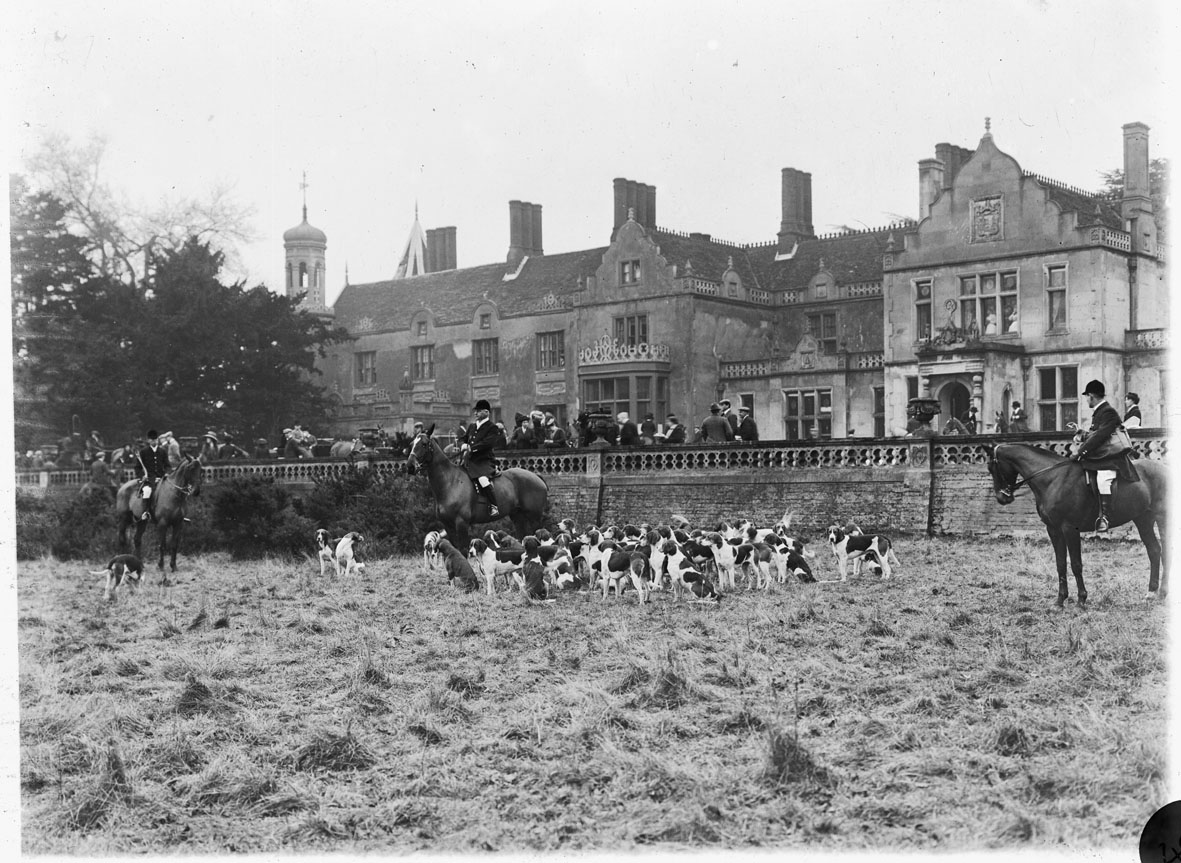
Foxhunt, Hardwick House, circa 1900

Hardwick House was a manor house near Bury St Edmunds, Suffolk, owned by Sir Robert Drury, Speaker of the House of Commons, of Hawstead Place. It was subsequently purchased in the seventeenth century by Royalist Thomas Cullum, a former Sheriff of London. Experts in Suffolk county history as well as noted authorities in antiquarian and botanical matters, the Cullum family of eight successive baronets authored works on the county and its fauna and flora. Sir Thomas Gery Cullum (1741–1831), a Charterhouse graduate, medical doctor and member of the Royal Academy and the Linnean Society, was a well-regarded author on science and botany.

== History ==
Lords of the manor of Hardwick, the Cullum family lived at Hardwick House for almost three centuries, from 1656 until the 1920s, producing a line of baronets who were physicians, botanists, antiquarians, authors, horticulturalists, ministers and two of whom served as Bath King of Arms for the Order of the Bath for nearly 60 years. Ultimately, the Cullum family estate was sold during the Depression of the 1920s when the last family member died without direct heir, and it was later dismantled for building materials in 1926-1927.

Hardwick House was built on what were formerly the medieval grazing lands of St Edmundsbury Abbey, which were sold during the Dissolution of the Monasteries. Eventually the properties fell to Sir Robert Drury of nearby Hawstead Place, a former moated manor now demolished. The Drury family lived at Hawstead for 150 years before Sir Robert – who had removed his paintings and furniture to his newly built Hardwick House in 1610 – died in 1615 and the eldest line of the Drury family became extinct. The only standing remains of Hawstead are the brick gate pillars at the entrance to the manor and some other brickwork and the moat: however the painted emblematic panels of the last Lady Drury's private oratory or chamber of meditation were transferred to Hardwick, and are now kept at Christchurch Mansion, Ipswich. Queen Elizabeth I spent one night at Hawstead Place in 1578, when she was said to have knighted the owner, Sir William Drury, after he restored to her the silver-handled fan she had dropped into the moat at Hawstead Place. The Hawstead and Hardwick Estates were sold by the heirs of Robert Drury in 1656 to Sir Thomas Cullum, first Cullum Baronet who had grown rich as a London draper and been Sheriff of London in 1646.

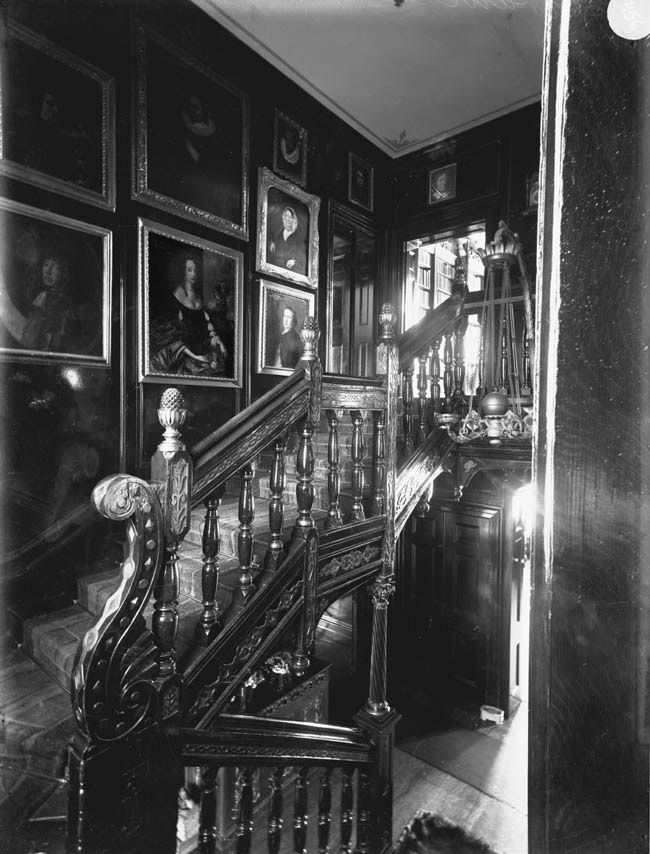
Interior of Elizabethan Hardwick House, showing staircase. Circa 1900

Hardwick House, standing one and a half miles south of Bury, was a Jacobean house of 1612 thought to have incorporated the medieval Abbey Lodge and featured a bold portico entrance with enormous carved oak doors and the Drury coat of arms carved above the doorway. The House was embroidered over the centuries by the Cullums who added gables, towers, ornate cut flint Tolkiensian cottage confections, gazebos, fountains, statuary and planting.

Hardwick eventually was expanded to include seven principal bedrooms, nine bachelors rooms and secondary bedrooms, twelve servants' bedrooms and three bathrooms. With its bibliophile owners, the home had several libraries. (Most of the library collection, the 'Cullum Collection', was later donated to the Bury St Edmunds Record Office, where it remains.) Hardwick House also had an extensive collection of portraits, one of which was of Sir Thomas Gargrave, a once-powerful Yorkshire knight related to Sir Thomas Gery Cullum's wife's family. The Cullum family portraits were bequeathed to the Borough of St Edmundsbury in 1921 by the last surviving member of the Cullum family.

The extensive grounds of Hardwick House were largely the creation of Sir Dudley Cullum, owner of the manor between 1680 and 1720, a keen horticulturalist and the only member of the Cullum family to be an MP – he served as a Whig for Suffolk from 1702–05. The house had a 2-acre (8,100 m^{2}) kitchen garden and several other gardens: an Italian garden with rosery and flowerbeds; a lime and sycamore tree-lined avenue; and a large 'pleasure grounds', with gazebos, and planted with exotic trees and shrubs. The kitchen garden also had pear, peach, plum, apple, cherry, and fig trees. The so-called 'Winter Garden,' also created by Sir Dudley, had a range of glass greenhouses for his horticultural pursuits, as well as a conservatory and orangery, palm house, peach house and a vinery.

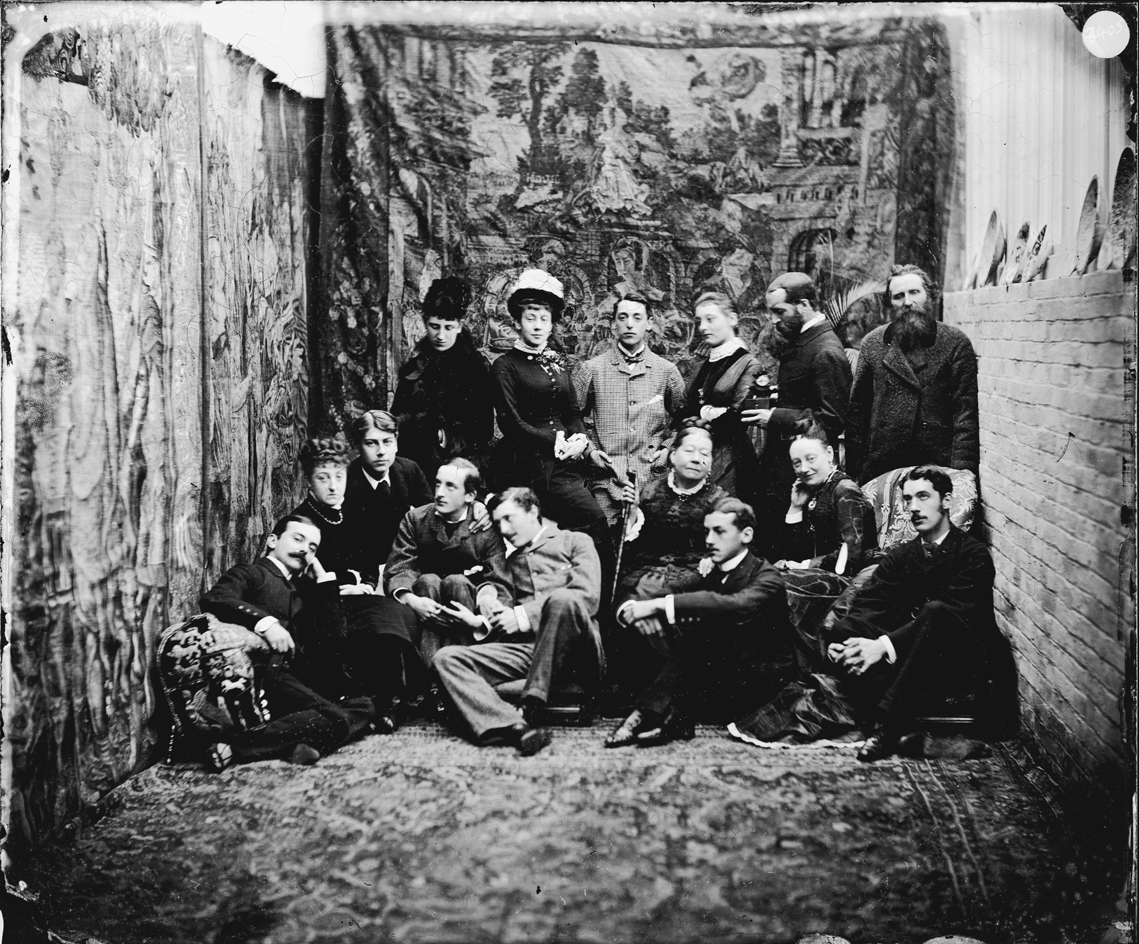
Group portrait at Hardwick House, 1876

The gardens at Hardwick were created, in part, by the English horticulturalist and gardener John Evelyn, who consulted on them with his friend Dudley Cullum. In a letter to Evelyn of 1694, Cullum expressed his delight at the effectiveness of the stove which heated his greenhouses.

The Hardwick Estate eventually came to embrace a small village of properties, including adjoining farms and cottages built by the Cullum baronets on the initial holding. A smaller gardeners cottage adjacent to walled garden of Hardwick House was eventually expanded to be a full-scale home in its own right (known as Hardwick Manor from 1926). Hardwick became so elaborate that it came to include a Venetian indoor riding school, also being the centre of a busy social scene, with fox hunting parties often gathering on the Cullum estate.

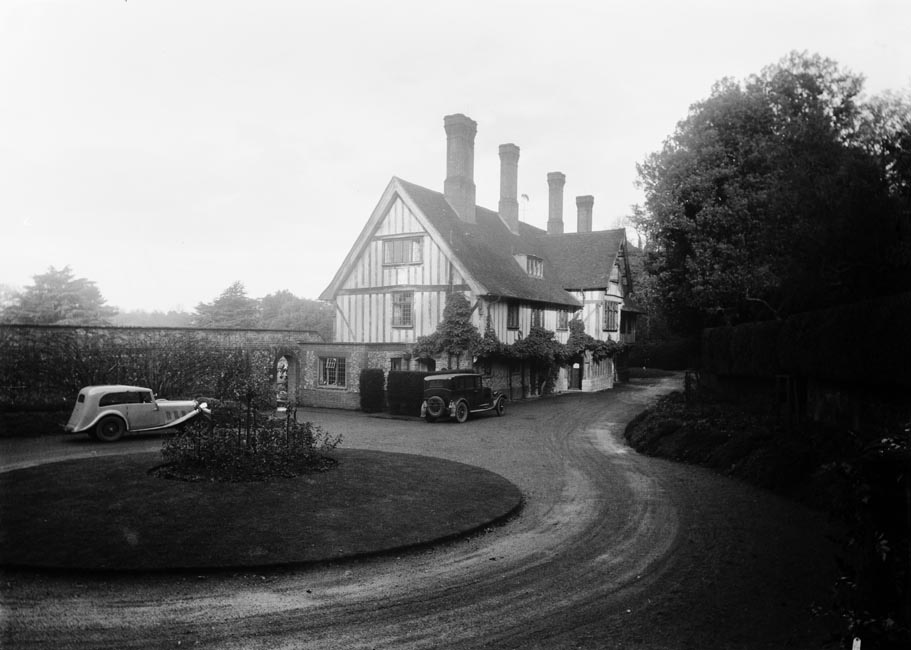
Hardwick Manor House, one of many homes on the estate of now-demolished Hardwick House

Suffolk MP Thomas Milner Gibson, who lived at Theberton House, Suffolk, married Arethusa Susannah, the daughter of Rev Sir Thomas Gery Cullum (1777–1855), 8th and last Baronet and High Sheriff of Suffolk. Their son, the last of the senior line of the Cullums, was the well-known antiquarian and author George Gery Milner-Gibson-Cullum (1857–1921), F.S.A.

In 1907 the house was rented by Harold Soames (1855-1918), father of Olave Baden-Powell (then 18).

Following the death of the owner in 1921, the estate passed to the Crown and sold under the Intestates Estates Act 1884 (47 & 48 Vict. c. 71), and the house was ultimately dismantled.

The grounds and site of the formal gardens and statuary today of the former Cullum estate constitute Hardwick Heath (55 acres (220,000 m^{2}) turned into public parkland), Bury St Edmunds District Scouts Hardwick Heath Campsite, the West Suffolk Hospital, the grounds of Hardwick Manor and housing developments. The site of Hardwick House itself is a wood bordering some original cedar and yew trees.

Many of the Drury family, as well as the Cullums, are buried at All Saints' Church in Hawstead.

== See also ==
- Thomas Gery Cullum
- Thomas Milner Gibson

== Sources ==
- Hardwick House, Bury St Edmunds Past and Present Society, burypastandpresent.org.uk
