= Sir Thomas Cullum, 1st Baronet =

English businessman and holder of civic offices

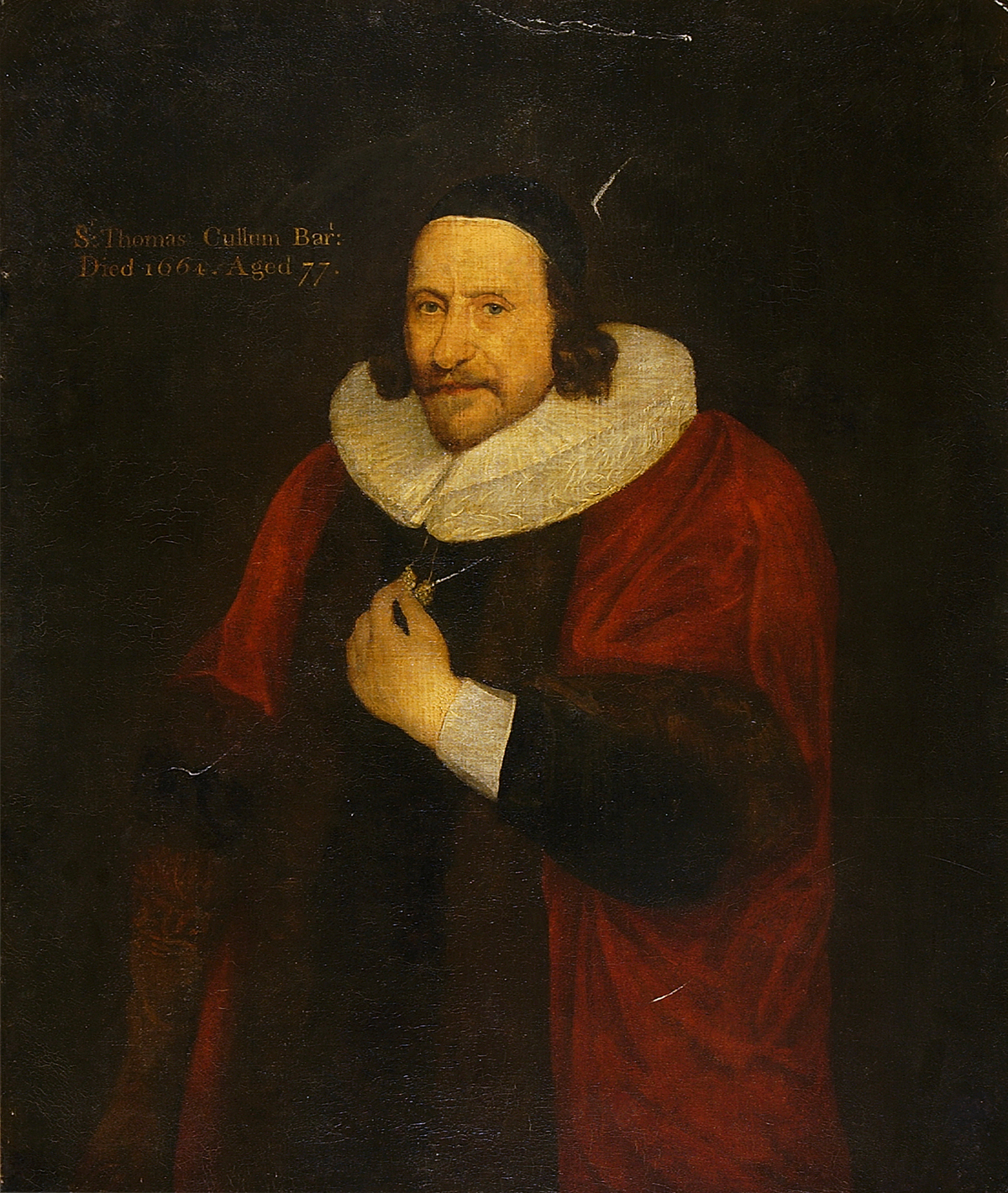
Sir Thomas Cullum

Sir Thomas Cullum, 1st Baronet (1587 – 6 April 1664) was an English businessman and holder of civic offices including Sheriff of London. In later years he retired to Hardwick House, Suffolk.

== Life ==
Cullum, baptised on 28 April 1587, was the second son of John Cullum of Thorndon, Suffolk, and Rebecca, daughter of Thomas Smith of Bacton in the same county. As a younger son he was sent in 1607 to London and apprenticed to one John Rayney, a draper, and on the expiration of his apprenticeship was taken by his master into partnership. Cullum by shrewdness and industry amassed a large fortune in his business in Gracechurch Street, and became an alderman and a member of the Drapers' Company. He married in 1623 Mary, daughter and coheiress of Nicholas Crisp, alderman of London, through whom he became related to the Royalist Sir Nicholas Crisp; like him he espoused the royal cause during the Civil War. Cullum and his wife had two sons and two daughters, and six other children who died in infancy. Mary died in 1637, aged 35, and was buried at All Hallows Lombard Street, London.

From 1643 to 1650 Cullum held the office of commissioner of excise. He was alderman of Cordwainer ward from 1643 to 1652, and in 1646 to 1647 was Sheriff of London. He became a member of the City militia committee in May 1647; he was imprisoned in the Tower of London from September 1647 to March 1648, with the Lord Mayor, Sir John Gayer, and other aldermen, for having been concerned in some Royalist outbreak in the city. They published a declaration in their defence, which was printed.

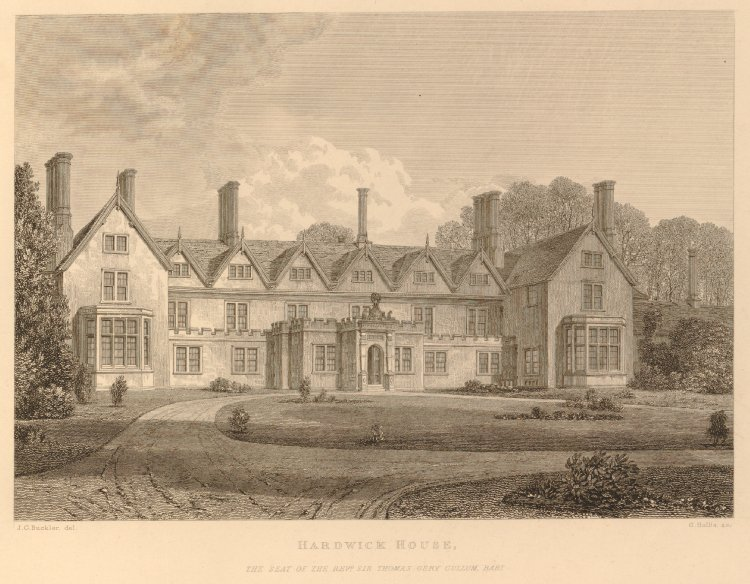
Hardwick House, Cullum's residence from 1656, pictured in the 19th century

After 1649 he invested in property in London and Suffolk; in 1656 he retired from business and purchased for £18,000 the estates of Hawsted and Hardwick, near Bury St Edmunds in Suffolk. At the Restoration Cullum was rewarded by being created a baronet on 18 June 1660, but he seems to have fallen into disfavour with the ruling powers, as on 17 July 1661 he had a pardon under the great seal for all treasons and rebellions, with all their concomitant enormities, committed by him before the 29th of the preceding December. An audit had revealed that he had, as excise commissioner, retained a large sum of money in excise arrears, which he was compelled to repay; this he seems to have paid into the exchequer in 1663 to buy his peace. He died at Hawsted on 6 April 1664, in his seventy-eighth year, and was buried there.
