= Sir Edmund Bacon, 2nd Baronet, of Redgrave =

English politician

Sir Edmund Bacon 2nd Baronet of Redgrave
- Born: 1570
- Died: 10 April 1649 (aged 78–79)
- Education: Corpus Christi College
- Title: Baronet of Redgrave
- Predecessor: Sir Nicholas Bacon, 1st Baronet, of Redgrave
- Successor: Sir Robert Bacon, 3rd Baronet
- Spouse: Phillipa Wotton
- Parents: Sir Nicholas Bacon (father); Anne Butts Bacon (mother)
- Family: Bacon Baronets
- Honours: Knight of the Shire

Sir Edmund Bacon, 2nd Baronet (c. 1570 – 10 April 1649) was an English baronet and politician. Edmund was wealthy, possessing around £6,000. He was a nephew of Francis Bacon and a friend of Sir Henry Wotton with whom he would often talk about his uncle's scientific experiments. Edmund's beliefs about religion are unknown, although he was described by a Puritan chaplain named Robert Allen as "Lovers of piety and justice, and friends to the church of God."

== Biography ==
He was born in 1570 as the oldest son of Sir Nicholas Bacon of Redgrave, Suffolk and his wife Anne Butts. Edmund was educated at Corpus Christi College, Cambridge, and admitted to Gray's Inn in 1586.

Due to his family influence, he became a Knight of the Shire while still in his twenties. On 26 February 1593 he joined a subsidy committee. Later, on 9 March in 1593 he Edmund joined a legal committee.

In 1624, Bacon succeeded his father as baronet. With the help of his family, he got a seat as Member of Parliament for Eye from 1588 to 1589. Later he would become a member of parliament for Suffolk in 1593 and 1625. He was appointed High Sheriff of Suffolk in 1634.

Bacon married Philippa Wotton, the daughter of Edward Wotton, 1st Baron Wotton. Together, they had no children. Her uncle, the diplomat Henry Wotton often came to Redgrave Hall to visit his "sweet niece". He enjoyed their company and wrote "there is in their conversations, and in the freedom of their entertainment, a kind of delightful violence". After Lady Bacon's death in 1626, Henry Wotton wrote to Bacon mentioning the monument of "his own excellent invention" which he had built for her at St Mary's Church, Redgrave.

Edmund Bacon died on 10 April 1649 and was buried in Redgrave, Suffolk. He was succeeded in the baronetcy by his younger brother Robert.

Baronetage of England
Preceded by Nicholas Bacon	Baronet (of Redgrave); 1624–1649	Succeeded by Robert Bacon
