= Dudley Cullum =

English politician and author

Sir Dudley Cullum's Estate Act 1691
- Act of Parliament
- Parliament of England
- Long title: An Act for enabling Sir Dudley Cullum Baronet to raise Monies, to pay his Brother and Sisters Portions.
- Citation: 3 Will. & Mar. c. 11 Pr.
- Territorial extent: England and Wales

Dates
- Royal assent: 24 February 1692
- Commencement: 22 October 1691 (Note: Start of session.)

Status: Current legislation

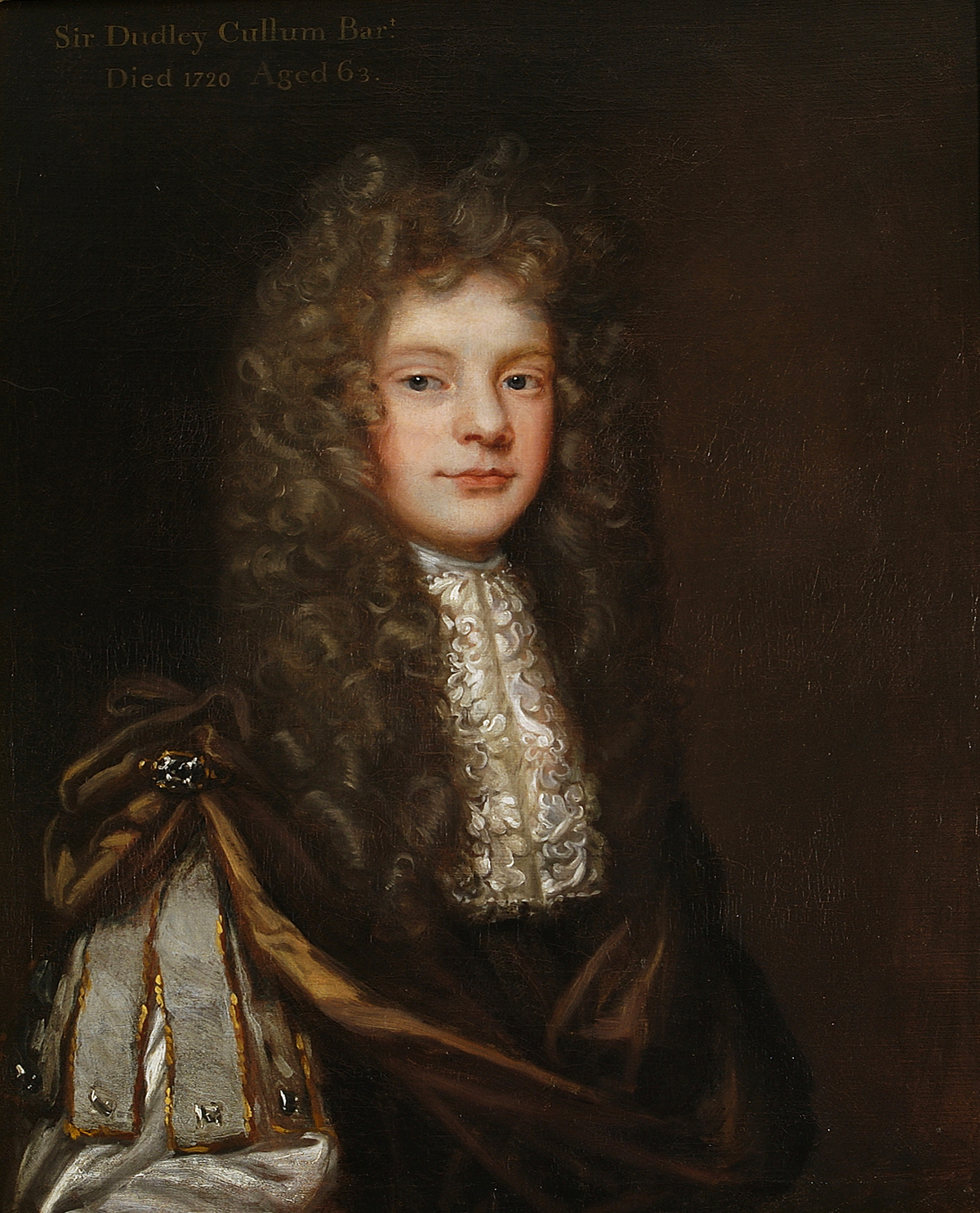
Sir Dudley Cullum, 3rd Bt.

Sir Dudley Cullum, 3rd Baronet (17 September 1657 – 16 September 1720) was an English Whig Member of Parliament and horticultural author.

Dudley Cullum was the son of Sir Thomas Cullum, Bart., of Badmondesfield, Wickhambrook, Suffolk. He was educated in Bury St Edmunds and at St John's College, Cambridge. He succeeded as third Baronet (of Hastede in Suffolk) on 16 October 1680. He was appointed High Sheriff of Suffolk for 1690 and from 1702 to 1705 was Member of Parliament for Suffolk.

== Bibliography ==
- leighrayment.com
- https://web.archive.org/web/20180818113510/http://www.leighrayment.com/commons/Scommons6.htm

Baronetage of England
Preceded by Thomas Cullum	Baronet (of Hastede); 1680–1720	Succeeded by Thomas Cullum
