= Lady Drury's Closet =

Series of painted wooden panels

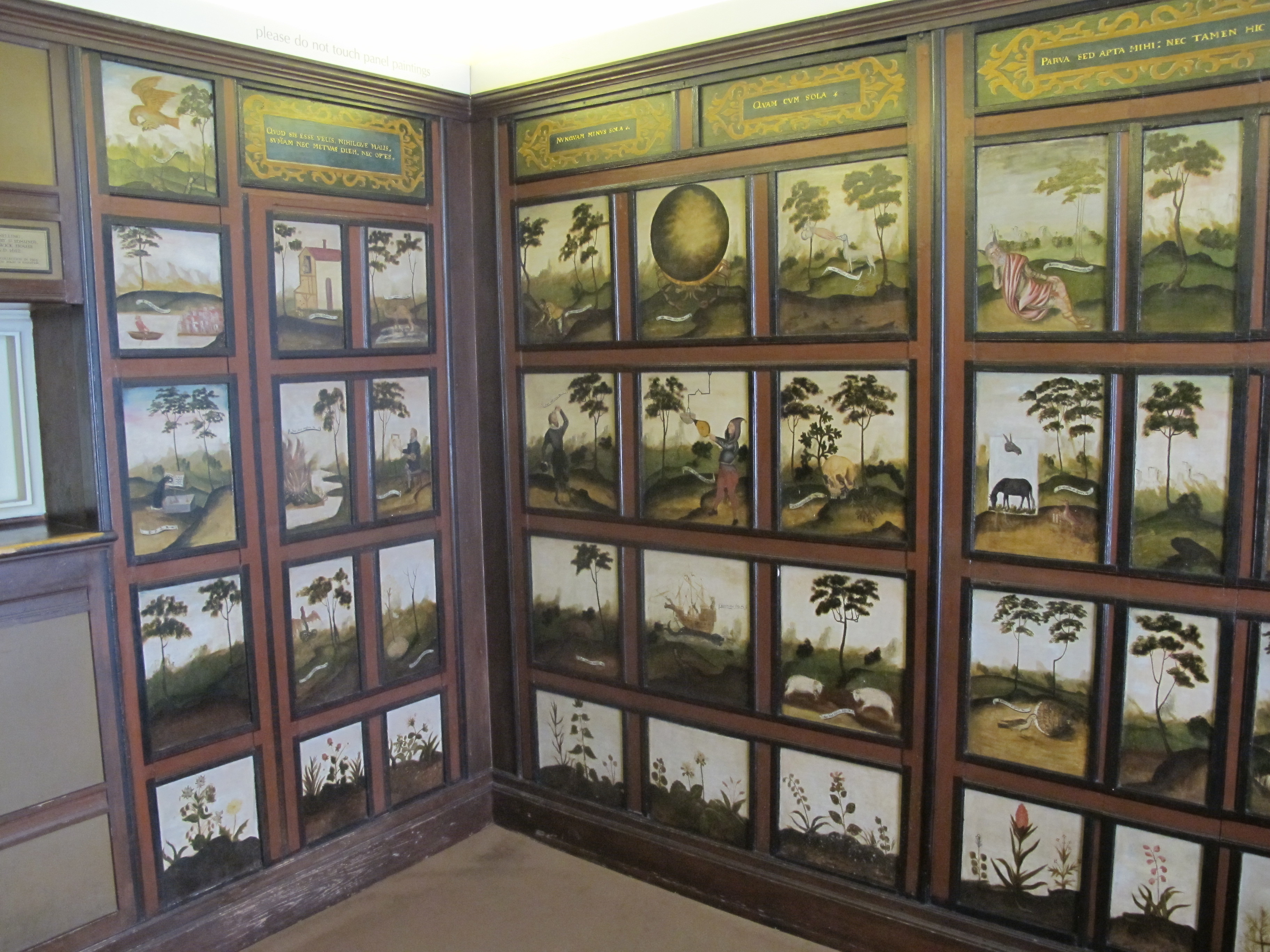
Part of the emblematic panelling from Lady Drury's painted closet, originally at Hawstead Place near Bury St Edmunds

Lady Drury's Closet (also known as the Hawstead Panels) is a series of painted wooden panels of early 17th-century date, currently installed in the room over the porch of Christchurch Mansion in Ipswich, Suffolk, England.

They originally decorated a painted closet, about 7 feet (2.1 m) square, adjacent to a bedroom in Hawstead Place, near Bury St Edmunds. It is believed they were made for Anne Drury, Lady Drury, wife of Sir Robert Drury of Hawstead and Hardwick, who died in 1624. They were removed to Hardwick House, probably by Sir Robert, before 1615; and when the Hardwick House contents were sold in 1924, they were purchased for and installed in Christchurch Mansion when it had already become the home of the Fine and Decorative Arts collections of the Ipswich Museum.

The panels contain a series of emblems of the kind associated with emblem books—images fashionable throughout Europe for private religious meditation in that age. The original sequence of the emblems is unclear, although the panels as arranged under their Latin "headings" are as originally devised. In addition to their importance for the study of emblems in general, they are significant because the Drurys were patrons of the poet and divine John Donne, who wrote his two Anniversaries following the death in 1610 of their daughter Elizabeth Drury—namely, An Anatomy of the World and The Second Anniversarie or the Progresse of the Soule. The epigrammatic and verbally or visually paradoxical themes of the paintings are, however, linked more directly to the themes and techniques of meditation developed in the writings and sermons of the preacher Joseph Hall, who was chaplain and spiritual advisor to Lady Drury at Hawstead.

== See also ==
- Francis Quarles
- Boetius a Bolswert

== Sources ==
- Farmer, N.K., Poets and the Visual Arts in Renaissance England, University of Texas Press (1984).
- Mantz, D.C., S.E. Gardner and E.M. Ramsden, "'The Benefit of an Image, Without the Offence': Anglo-Dutch Emblematics and Hall's Liberation of the Lyric Soul" in Westerweel, Bart (1997). Anglo-Dutch Relations in the Field of the Emblem. BRILL. ISBN 9004108688.
