= Montford Scott =

Blessed Montford Scott
- Born: c.1550, Norfolk, England
- Died: 1 July 1591, London, England
- Martyred by: Queen Elizabeth I of England
- Means of martyrdom: Hanging, drawing and quartering
- Venerated in: Great Britain
- Beatified: 22 November 1987, Vatican City, by Pope John Paul II
- Feast: 2 July

Blessed Montford Scott (b. in Hawstead, Suffolk, England; executed at Fleet Street, London, on 1 July 1591) was an English Roman Catholic priest. He is a Catholic martyr, beatified in 1987 as one of the Eighty-five martyrs of England and Wales.

== Life ==
Scott was born about 1550 in the diocese of Norwich. Having studied at Trinity Hall, Cambridge, he went to Douai College in 1574, as one of the earliest seminary students there, and studied theology. The next year he was made subdeacon, and accompanied Dominic Vaughan to England.

In Essex they fell into the hands of the Government, December 1576, and under examination, Vaughan gave the names of Catholics both in London and Essex. They were then handed over by the Privy Council to the Archbishop of Canterbury for further examination, but nothing more was elicited, and they were afterwards set at liberty.

Scott returned to Douai on 22 May 1577, and having been ordained priest at Brussels set out for the English mission on 17 June. The vessel in which he crossed to England was attacked by pirates, but he escaped with some loss of his goods. In 1578, he was captured at Cambridge and sent to London by the university's Vice-Chancellor "with all such books, letters, writings, and other trash which were taken about them", but eventually released. He is mentioned as having laboured in Kent (1580), Norfolk, Suffolk (1583), Lincolnshire and Yorkshire (1584). On 24 April 1584, John Nedeham and others were indicted at Norwich for having, on 1 June 1582, received blessed beads from him.

In 1584 he was captured at York at brought to London, where he remained a prisoner for seven years. His release was procured by a money payment from one Baker, on condition of his leaving the country. Meanwhile, he had visited the Catholics in Wisbech Castle.

Richard Topcliffe immediately procured his re-arrest. Scott was apprehended along with his cousin, Brian Lacey. He was brought to trial at the sessions at Newgate, with George Beesley (30 June 1591), and was condemned on account of his priesthood and of his being in the country contrary to the statute. Scott had initially been put down for banishment, but Topcliffe secured his execution on the grounds that "it was good policy to put him to death" as his "austere life" attracted people, who considered him a saint.

The next day he was drawn to Fleet Street, where he was executed.

== Brian Lacey ==
Brian Lacey, cousin and companion of Montford Scott, was apprehended with Scott in 1591. Lacey was committed to Bridewell where he was cruelly tortured by Topcliffe in the vain endeavour to elicit at whose houses he had been with Scott. He was arraigned before the lord mayor at the Old Bailey and condemned to be hanged for aiding and abetting priests. Five years previously Lacey had suffered imprisonment in Newgate for religion, and he was then three times examined by Justice Young. Information against him as a distributor and dispenser of letters to Catholics and against Montford Scott had been given by his own brother, Richard Lacey, gentleman, of Brockdish, Norfolk. Lacey was later declared "Venerable".
