= Hardwick, Suffolk =

Former civil parish in Suffolk, England

Coordinates: 52.225126°N 0.70716667°E

Hardwick
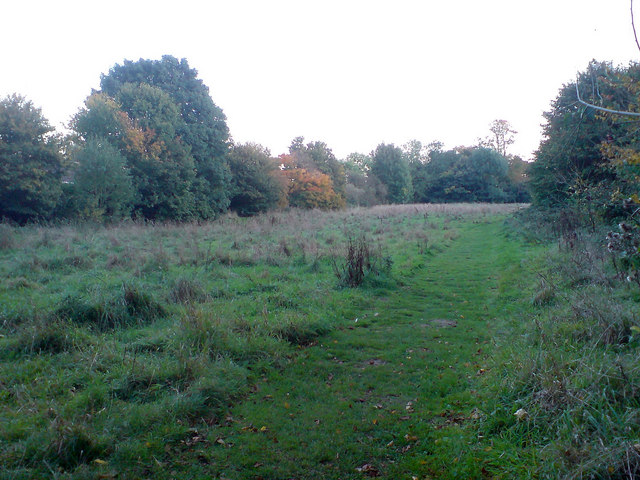

- Location within Suffolk
- Civil parish: Bury St Edmunds
- District: West Suffolk
- Shire county: Suffolk
- Region: East
- Country: England
- Sovereign state: United Kingdom

Hardwick is a former civil parish, now in the parish of Bury St Edmunds, in the West Suffolk district, in the county of Suffolk, England. In 1971 the parish had a population of 4.

== History ==
The name "Hardwick" means 'Herd farm'. Hardwick was an extra-parochial area, it belonged to Bury Abbey and contained Hardwick House, it became a civil parish in 1858. In 1889 it became part of the administrative county of West Suffolk and in 1894 it became part of Thingoe Rural District. In 1937 the ecclesiastical parish was abolished and merged with Norton. In 1974 it became part of the St Edmundsbury district in the non-metropolitan county of Suffolk. On 1 April 1988 the civil parish was abolished and the area became unparished. In 2003 the area of the former parish became part of Bury St Edmunds civil parish, in 2019 St Edmundsbury district was abolished and the area of the former parish became part of West Suffolk district.
