= Anne Bacon Drury =

Anne Bacon Drury (1572–1624) was an English literary patron. Her painted closet survives as a very rare example of Jacobean interior decoration.

Anne was the fourth daughter of Sir Nicholas Bacon (d. 1624) and Anne Butts (d. 1610). Her grandfather was Sir Nicolas Bacon, and her uncle Francis Bacon.

Her future brother-in-law, Philip Gawdy called her "Nann Bacon". She married Sir Robert Drury of Hawstead and Hardwick in 1592. Her parents provided a dowry of £1,600. Anne was a friend of the poet John Donne. Donne's Anniversaries commemorate her daughter Elizabeth Drury, who died in 1610 aged 14 or 15.

Letters addressed to Lady Bacon include Latin phrases. She created a painted bedroom closet for meditation and study and entertaining close friends at Hawstead Place, near Bury St Edmunds. The painted panelling was removed to Hardwick House, Suffolk. It is now in Christchurch Mansion, part of Ipswich Museum. The decoration consists of a series of forty emblems including Latin phrases.

In August 1610 the family had a royal license to travel, and were said to be going from France to Spa in Belgium. They travelled abroad again in 1611, after the death of their daughter Elizabeth. Anne and Robert Drury were in Vlissingen in August 1612 and met Viscount Lisle.

Robert Drury died in April 1615. Anne Drury made her will in 1621. She bequeathed a cloth bed of "my owne workinge", that she had embroidered, to her sister-in-law, Elizabeth Drury Cecil, Countess of Exeter. Her closet contained a couch bed.

She died on 5 June 1624 at Hardwick House. She was buried in All Saints' Church, Hawstead.

== Monument to Elizabeth Drury ==
Her daughter Dorothy Drury died aged 4 in 1597. Her daughter Elizabeth Drury died in 1610. She had a memorial portrait made which shows her lying as if alive on a couch. Her monument in Hawstead church has her effigy in a similar pose, with a verse inscription possibly by John Donne who also composed an Elegy for the child.

== Sources ==
- R. C. Bald, Donne and the Drurys (1959)
- H. L. Meakin, The Painted Closet of Lady Anne Bacon Drury (Ashgate, Aldershot, 2013) ISBN 9780754663973
- J. Rowe, 'Drury family (per. 1485–1624)', Oxford Dictionary of National Biography, online edn, Jan 2008, subscription required. doi:10.1093/ref:odnb/73909
