= Hawstead =

Village in Suffolk, England

Coordinates: 52.198°N 0.719°E

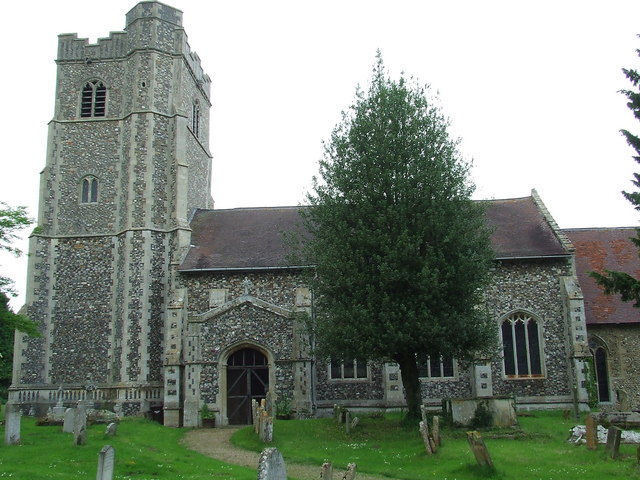
- All Saints' Church, Hawstead

- Location within Suffolk
- Population: 134 (2011 Census)
- District: West Suffolk
- Shire county: Suffolk
- Region: East
- Country: England
- Sovereign state: United Kingdom
- Post town: Bury St Edmunds
- Postcode district: IP29

Hawstead is a small village and civil parish in the West Suffolk district of Suffolk in eastern England. It is located 5 kilometres (3 mi) south of Bury St. Edmunds between the B1066 and A134 roads, in a fork formed by the River Lark and a small tributary.

The place-name 'Hawstead' is first attested in the Domesday Book of 1086, where it appears as Haldsteada. The name is thought to mean 'a place of shelter for cattle'.

Hawstead Place, previously the seat of the Drury family, is now a farmhouse. Sir William Drury was sheriff and knight of the shire for Suffolk.

Lady Drury's Closet (also known as the Hawstead Panels), now in Christchurch Mansion in Ipswich, is a series of painted wooden panels of early 17th-century date. They originally decorated a painted closet adjacent to a bedroom in Hawstead Place. It is believed they were made for Anne Drury, Lady Drury, wife of Sir Robert Drury, who died in 1624.

Lt Col Edward Robert Drury, son of Rev Sir William Drury, was the first general manager and president of the Queensland Bank of Australia now the National Australia Bank; he named his Queensland home 'Hawstead' in 1875.

== Demography ==
According to the Office for National Statistics, at the time of the United Kingdom Census 2001, Hawstead had a population of 334 with 121 households. falling to a population of 134 in 56 households at the 2011 Census.

=== Population change ===
Population growth in Hawstead from 1801 to 1891
Year	1801	1811	1821	1831	1841	1851	1881	1891
Population	392	409	404	414	457	520	321	325
Source: A Vision of Britain Through Time

Population growth in Hawstead from 1901 to 2001
Year	1901	1911	1921	1931	1951	1961	2001	2011
Population	297	292	266	228	256	248	334	134
Source: A Vision of Britain Through Time

== Notable residents ==
- Robert Drury (1539–1614), Knight, Lord of the Manor of Hawstead, and Knight of the Body to Kings Henry VII and Henry VIII. Speaker of the House of Commons (elected 4 October 1495), and Privy Councillor.
- Montford Scott, (1550-1591) Catholic priest and martyr.
