= Sir Nicholas Bacon, 1st Baronet, of Redgrave =

English politician

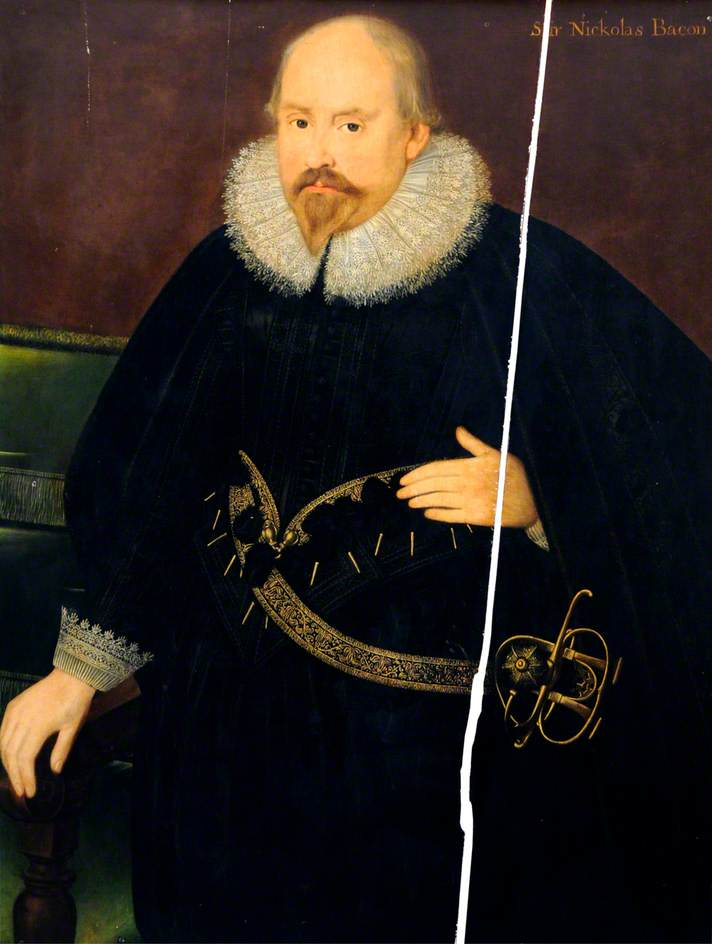
- Tenure: 22 May 1611–1624
- Predecessor: none (title created)
- Successor: Sir Edmund Bacon, 2nd Baronet, of Redgrave
- Born: 1540
- Died: 22 November 1624 (aged 83–84)
- Spouse: Anne Butts
- Issue: Elizabeth Bacon; Dorothy Bacon; Sir Edmund Bacon; Anne Bacon Drury; Sir Robert Bacon; Jemimah Bacon; Sir Nathaniel Bacon
- Father: Sir Nicholas Bacon, Lord Keeper of the Great Seal
- Mother: Jane Ferneley

Sir Nicholas Bacon, 1st Baronet (c. 1540–22 November 1624), of Redgrave, Suffolk, English Member of Parliament. In 1611 he became the first man to be made a baronet. Bacon would serve on many commissions. The Privy Council constantly called upon him to conduct inquiries. He was a puritan leader in Suffolk. The power and prestige of the puritan ministries in many areas of the country owed their power to Bacon. Sir Nicholas Bacon was considered a good Christian by his contemporaries. Especially his chaplain, Robert Allen. Robert Allen stated that Bacon's wife was dedicated to "God's holy religion and worship by every good and Christian means in the sight of men."

== Biography ==
Bacon was born the eldest son of Sir Nicholas Bacon, Lord Keeper of the Great Seal and his first wife, Jane Ferneley. He was the half-brother of Sir Francis Bacon. Nicholas was educated at Trinity College, Cambridge. Bacon was admitted to Gray's Inn in 1562. He, with the help of Sir Robert Dudley, entered Parliament in 1563 as a member for Beverley. In 1572 his father helped him become the representative for Suffolk. A position he would retain until 1583. By 1576 Bacon had become an "ancient" member of the Gray's Inn society. Nicholas Bacon was knighted on 22 August 1578 by Queen Elizabeth. Later, in 1568 he would build an estate in Culford, the estate would be finished in 1591. Bacon would use the estate as a sheep farm. He owned other estates in Blackbourne, Shipmeadow, Redgrave, Ingham and Barnham.

In 1586 Bacon accused a man named Thomas Lovell of interfering with witnesses in a trial. This resulted in Lovell trying to fight a duel with Bacon. However, before the duel could take place, in 1593 the debate was settled and Lovell was kicked of a commission. In 1595 Nicholas married his daughter to Bassingbourne Gawdy II. Together with the Gawdy family, Bacon's family would stand in opposition to the Lovell Family. Nicholas was appointed High Sheriff of Suffolk in 1581.

In 1609 he and his wife inherited Foxearth Hall and Westons estate in Essex. On 22 May 1611, Bacon was created a baronet, of Redgrave in Suffolk, by James VI and I, making him England's first baronet. He married Anne Butts, granddaughter of Sir William Butts of Thornage, Norfolk, who had been a physician of Henry VIII. In 1612, he was visited by James VI and I. The king came to Culford in January 1619, to see his granddaughter Anne Gawdy, who was widely praised at this time, and admired by Prince Charles.

Nicholas Bacon died in 1624.

Shortly before Nicholas' death, it was uncovered that he had embezzled funds. In Bacon's will he left his household goods to his three younger sons and a daughter-in-law. He gave some of his wealth to his relatives, grandchildren and his servants. Nicholas left £100 to the poor people living on his manors, and funded the repair of the Wattisfield and Hepworth causeway. His two eldest sons were tasked with the repayment of his debts. The last words of the will were "Christ, none but Christ only! Go out my soul, go out! The angels are ready to guard thee into the presence of my God. And therefore be not dismayed, but go out oh my soul, go out. I pray God to bless my children and deliver the kingdom from popery."

== Family ==
The children of Nicholas Bacon and Anne Butts included:

- Elizabeth Bacon
- Dorothy Bacon, "Doll", who in 1595 married Bassingbourne Gawdy
- Sir Edmund Bacon, Second Baronet of Redgrave.
- Anne Bacon Drury, who married Sir Robert Drury.
- Sir Robert Bacon, 3rd Baronet of Redgrave, who married Anne Osbourne, a daughter of Sir Edward Osborne.
- Jemimah Bacon.
- Nathaniel Bacon, a painter.

Baronetage of England
New creation	Baronet (of Redgrave); 1611–1624	Succeeded by Edmund Bacon
