= R. G. Harper Pennington =

American painter (1854–1920)

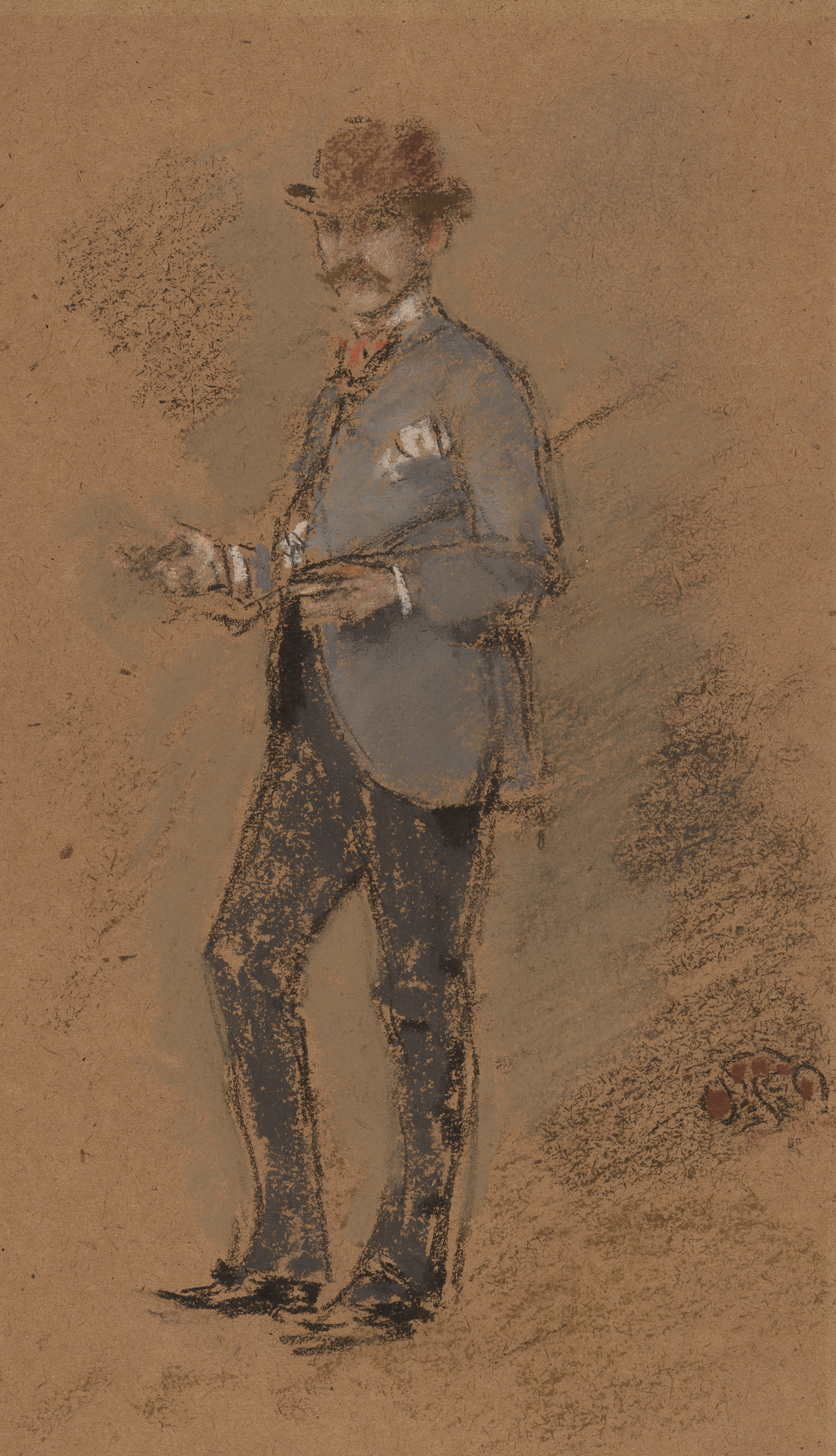
- Harper Pennington, by James McNeill Whistler
- Born: Robert Goodloe Harper Pennington; October 9, 1854; Baltimore, Maryland, U.S.
- Died: March 15, 1920 (aged 65); Catonsville, Maryland, U.S.
- Resting place: Green Mount Cemetery
- Education: École des Beaux-Arts
- Occupation: Painter
- Spouse: Caroline DeWolf Theobald (m. 1888; div. 1913)
- Children: 5
- Parent(s): William Clapham Pennington; Emily Louisa Harper
- Relatives: Robert Goodloe Harper (great-grandfather)

Robert Goodloe Harper Pennington (October 9, 1854 – March 15, 1920) was an American artist and writer known for his portraits of New York and Newport socialites.

== Early life ==
Pennington was born on October 9, 1854, in Baltimore, Maryland, and was named after his great-grandfather, the former U.S. Senator Robert Goodloe Harper. He was the son of William Clapham Pennington (1829–1913) and Emily Louisa (née Harper) Pennington (1835–1908). His brother was Dr. Clapham Pennington.

His paternal grandparents were Baltimore lawyer Josias Pennington (a close friend of John Pendleton Kennedy) and Sophia Cook (née Clapham) Pennington. His cousin, Josias Pennington, was a prominent architect with Baldwin & Pennington. His maternal grandparents were Charlotte Hutchinson (née Cheffelle) Harper and Charles Carroll Harper, the eldest son and heir of Robert Goodloe Harper and Catherine (née Carroll) Harper (a daughter of Charles Carroll of Carrollton). Catherine's sister Mary was the wife of Richard Caton (namesake of Catonsville, Maryland). (Note: Their daughters were Marianne Caton (wife of Robert Patterson (brother of Elizabeth Patterson Bonaparte) and, after his death, British statesman Richard Wellesley, 1st Marquess Wellesley); Elizabeth Caton (wife of Sir George Strafford, 8th Baron Strafford); Louisa Caton (wife of Col. Sir Felton Bathurst-Hervey, 1st Baronet and, after his death, Francis D'Arcy-Osborne, later the 7th Duke of Leeds); and Emily Caton (wife of John McTavish).)

== Career ==
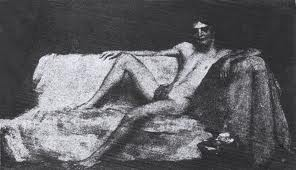
Pennington's Portrait of Robert Gould Shaw II as "Little Billee" from the novel Trilby, a painting said to be owned by Harry Lehr and hung in his bedroom.

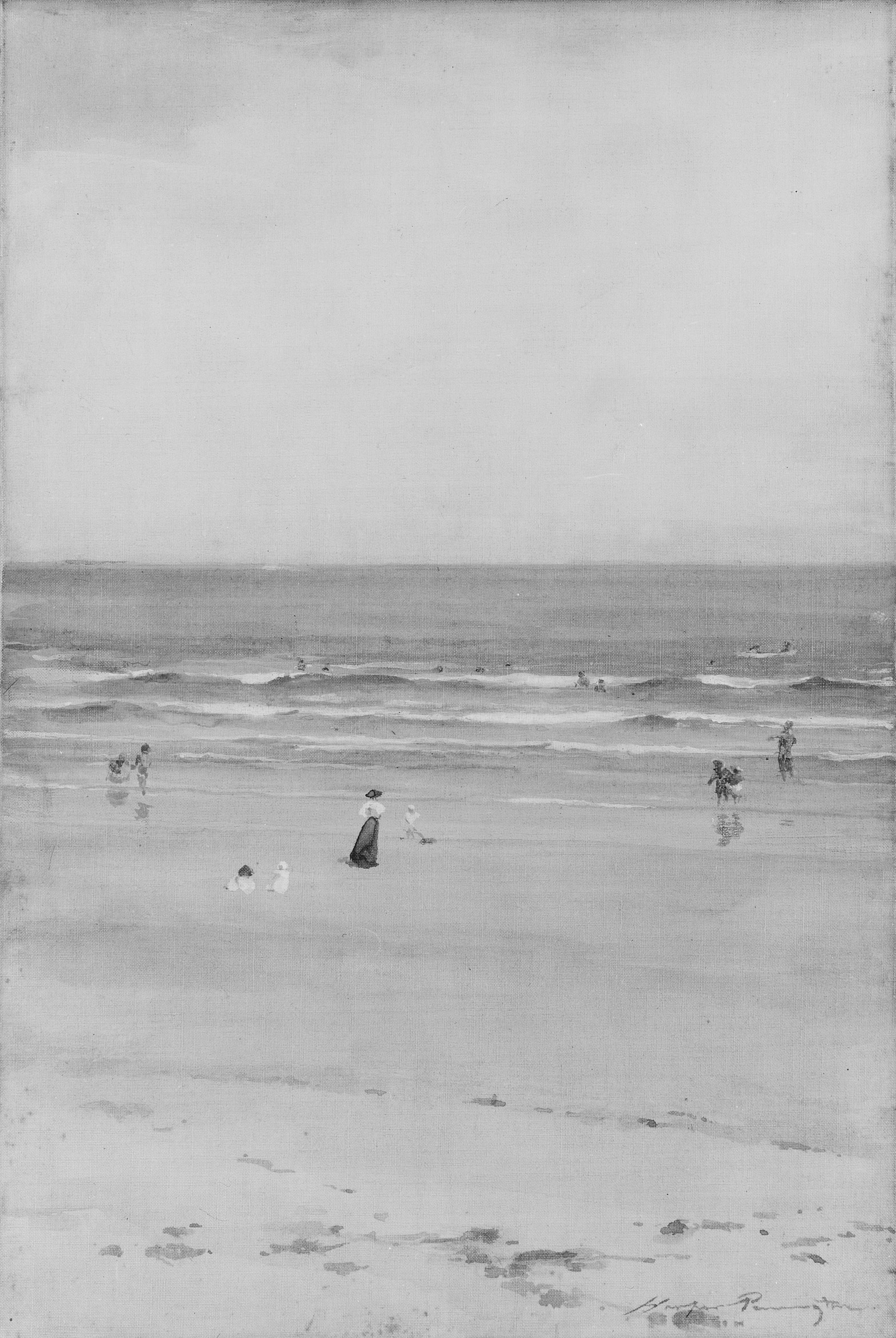
Pennington's Beach Scene, between 1875–1900.

Pennington studied art under Jean-Léon Gérôme at the École des Beaux-Arts. In 1880, while in Munich, he was advised to join a group of American painters led by Frank Duveneck in Florence, known as the "Duveneck boys", which included John White Alexander, Otto Henry Bacher, Robert Frederick Blum, Charles Abel Corwin, George Edward Hopkins, Julius Rolshoven and Theodore Wendel. While in Venice, he met James Abbott McNeill Whistler, whom he was a great admirer of, and the two became close friends. Whistler drew Pennington's portrait in chalk and pastel.

Pennington's small oil and pastel portraits show Whistler's influence and are sometimes mistaken for his work. Whistler invited Pennington to return with him to London in 1880, but Pennington decided to travel and paint around Italy. While in Venice, he painted a portrait of Robert Browning for Katherine de Kay Bronson, a prominent American expatriate.

After returning to London, Pennington took one of four studios at Carlyle Studios, alongside Theodore Roussel and George Percy Jacomb-Hood. In 1884, he made a full-length portrait of Oscar Wilde as a wedding gift for Wilde and his wife, Constance, which hung in Wilde's London home. He also created fifteen engravings from drawings for Wilde's 1889 essay, London Models. Pennington was a frequent visitor to Tite Street to see Whistler (whom he drew in 1885 while Whistler gave his Ten O'clock Lecture). In 1886 or 1887, Whistler drew Pennington's portrait for a second time. While in London, Pennington was a member of the Beefsteak Club, a private dining club in Leicester Square, and was "exceedingly popular in both London and Paris".

Pennington made several paintings for King Edward VII (then the Prince of Wales), "who was so well pleased with the artist's skill that he presented him with his photograph bearing his autograph." In 1885, he made portraits of Patsy Cornwallis-West and the Misses Edith Clarke and Nellie Farren Calhoun while in London. In 1899, Pennington wrote a letter to The New York Times, which was published in response to Layton Crippen's criticism of Henry Kirke Brown's sculpture of Washington in Union Square, where Pennington wrote:

"Art is unlike trade. A masterpiece cannot be short measure; it is too personal. In conclusion, I would like to remind Mr. Crippen that some (very many, too,) of the greatest living sculptors are Americans. Indeed, no foreigners can give us points on art matters any longer. Of course, the 'good Americans,' whose eyes are always fixed on Paris, (where he is said to go when he dies,) cannot yet perceive what has grown up under his feet in architecture, sculpture, and painting, and, after all, in the haste to become rich, nobody cares."

In 1908, he returned to Europe by traveling aboard the French liner La Provence to Paris.

== Personal life ==
On October 31, 1888, Pennington was married to Caroline DeWolf Theobald (1869–1962), a daughter of Dr. Samuel Theobald, a leading physician of Baltimore (and grandson of surgeon Nathan Ryno Smith). Before their divorce in 1913, they were the parents of four daughters and one son:

- Charlotte Emily Pennington (b. 1889)
- Marjory Innocence Pennington (1891–1992), married Edward Norris Kimball, Sr. (grandparents of Christopher Kimball)
- Caroline DeWolf Pennington (b. 1895)
- Dorothea Harper Pennington (b. 1896), married Robert W. Nelson.
- William Pennington (b. 1900)

After two years of ill health, Pennington died from pneumonia at the Dr. Richard F. Gundry Sanitarium in Catonsville on March 15, 1920. He was buried at Green Mount Cemetery in Baltimore.
