= Robert Goodloe Harper =

American politician (1765–1825)

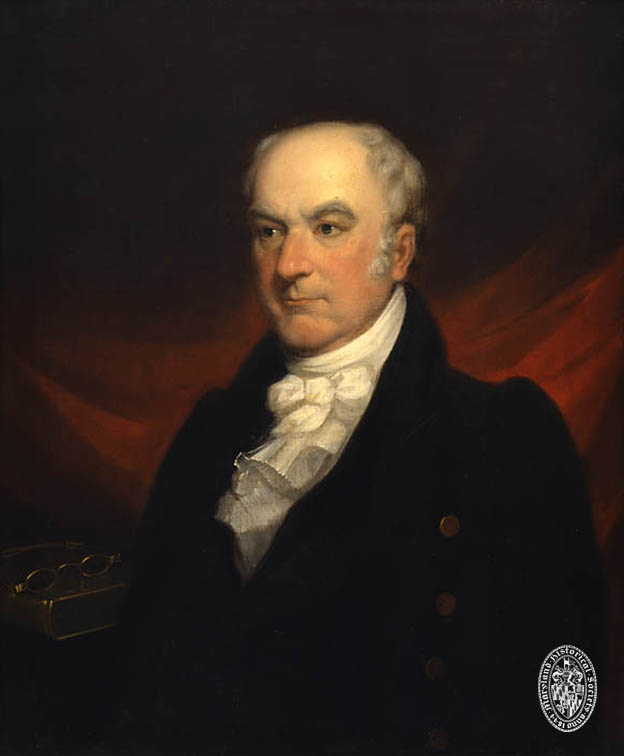

United States Senator from Maryland
- In office January 29, 1816 – December 6, 1816
- Preceded by: Samuel Smith
- Succeeded by: Alexander C. Hanson

Member of the U.S. House of Representatives from South Carolina's 5th district
- In office February 9, 1795 – March 3, 1801
- Preceded by: Alexander Gillon
- Succeeded by: William Butler

Member of the South Carolina House of Representatives
- In office 1790–1795

Personal details
- Born: January 1765 Fredericksburg, Virginia Colony, British America
- Died: January 14, 1825 (aged 59–60) Baltimore, Maryland, U.S.
- Resting place: Green Mount Cemetery
- Party: Federalist

Military service
- Allegiance: United States
- Branch/service: United States Army
- Rank: Major general
- Battles/wars: War of 1812

Robert Goodloe Harper (January 1765 – January 14, 1825) was an American soldier and politician who was a member of the United States Senate from Maryland from January 1816 until his resignation in December of the same year. He also served in the South Carolina House of Representatives (1790–1795), the U.S. House of Representatives from South Carolina (1795–1801), and in the Maryland State Senate. He is best remembered for the phrase, "Millions for defense, but not one cent for tribute" in connection with the XYZ Affair. The town of Harper, Liberia, is named after him.

== Early life ==
Harper was born near Fredericksburg in the Colony of Virginia in January 1765. He was the fifth child and first son of Jesse Harper (b. 1733) and Emily Diana Goodloe (1734–1788) and moved with his parents to Granville, North Carolina around 1769. He received his early education at home and later attended grammar school.

At the age of fifteen, Harper joined a volunteer corps of Cavalry and served in the American Revolutionary Army. He made a surveying tour through Kentucky and Tennessee in 1783, and graduated from the College of New Jersey (now Princeton University) in 1785. He studied law in Charleston, South Carolina, teaching school at the same time, and was admitted to the bar in 1786.

== Career ==
He commenced practice in the Ninety-Six District of South Carolina, moving back to Charleston in 1789. From 1790 to 1795, Harper was a member of the South Carolina House of Representatives, at which time he was elected from South Carolina to the Third Congress to fill the vacancy caused by the death of Alexander Gillon. He was reelected to the Fourth, Fifth, and Sixth Congresses but was an unsuccessful candidate for reelection in 1800 to the Seventh Congress, serving as a U.S. Representative from February 9, 1795, to March 1801. While in Congress, he was the chairman of the Committee on Ways and Means in the Fifth and Sixth Congresses. Harper was one of the impeachment managers appointed by the House of Representatives in 1798 to conduct the impeachment proceedings against William Blount. He was one of the defense counsel in the impeachment trial of Samuel Chase in the United States Senate (1804-1805).

=== Political career in Maryland ===
Harper moved to Baltimore, Maryland, and engaged in the practice of law. He consorted with the men of the mob riots of Baltimore against the British in June 1812. He served in the War of 1812, attaining the rank of major general. He assisted in organizing the Baltimore Exchange Co. in 1815 and was a member of the first board of directors. He then became a member of the Maryland State Senate, and was later elected from Maryland to the United States Senate for the term beginning March 4, 1815, serving from January 1816 until December 1816, when he resigned. He was an unsuccessful Federalist candidate for Vice President in the 1816 election. He also received one electoral vote for vice president in the 1820 election.

In 1815, Harper was elected a member of the American Antiquarian Society. and traveled extensively in Europe in 1819 and 1820. He took a prominent part in the ceremonies on the occasion of Lafayette's visit to Baltimore in 1824.

== Personal life ==
On May 7, 1800, Harper married Catherine Carroll (1778–1861) in Anne Arundel County, Maryland. Catherine was the daughter of Charles Carroll and Mary (née Darnall) Carroll. Her elder sister, Mary, married Richard Caton. (Note: Their daughters were Marianne Caton (wife of Robert Patterson (brother of Elizabeth Patterson Bonaparte) and, after his death, British statesman Richard Wellesley, 1st Marquess Wellesley); Elizabeth Caton (wife of Sir George Strafford, 8th Baron Strafford); Louisa Caton (wife of Col. Sir Felton Bathurst-Hervey, 1st Baronet and, after his death, Francis D'Arcy-Osborne, later the 7th Duke of Leeds); and Emily Caton (wife of John McTavish).) Together, they were the parents of at least four children who survived to adulthood, including:

- Charles Carroll Harper (1802–1837), who married Charlotte Hutchinson Cheffelle (1807–1867) in 1827.
- Mary Diana Harper (1803–1818), who died young.
- Richard Caton Harper (1806–1815), who died young.
- Elizabeth Hyde Harper (1809–1823), who died unmarried.
- Emily Louisa Harper (1812–1892), who never married.
- Robert Goodloe Harper Jr. (1814–1854)

He died in Baltimore on January 14, 1825, and was initially interred in the family burial ground on his estate, Oakland in Roland Park, and later reburied in Green Mount Cemetery in Baltimore.

=== Descendants ===
Through his eldest son Charles, he was a grandfather of Emily Louisa Harper (1835–1908), who married William Clapham Pennington (1829–1913). Their son, Robert Goodloe Harper Pennington (1854–1920) was a prominent artist.

== Ancestry ==
Ancestors of Robert Goodloe Harper

4. Abraham Harper
2. Jesse Harper
20. Nicholas George
10. Nicholas David George
21. Elizabeth Ann James
5. Lettice George
11. Mary Ann Fowler
1. Robert Goodloe Harper
24. George Goodloe
12. Henry Goodloe
25. Mary Weeks
6. George Goodloe
26. Francis Weekes
13. Elizabeth Weekes
27. Mary Elizabeth Prescott
3. Emily Diana Goodloe
28. Doede Meijnderts
14. Garrett Minor
29. Elizabeth Montague
7. Diana Minor
30. John Vivion
15. Diane Vivian
21. Margaret Smith

U.S. House of Representatives
| Preceded by Alexander Gillon | Member of the U.S. House of Representatives from South Carolina's 5th congressional district 1795–1801 | Succeeded by William Butler |
U.S. Senate
| Preceded by Samuel Smith | U.S. senator (Class 1) from Maryland; 1816; Served alongside: Robert H. Goldsborough | Succeeded by Alexander C. Hanson |
