= Warfield Theobald Longcope =

American pathologist

- Born: March 29, 1877; Baltimore, Maryland
- Died: April 25, 1953 (aged 76); Lee, Massachusetts
- Education: Johns Hopkins University
- Awards: Kober Medal in 1948
- Scientific career
- Fields: pathology
- Workplaces: University of Pennsylvania; Columbia University; Cornell University; Johns Hopkins University

Warfield Theobald Longcope (29 March 1877 – 25 April 1953) was an American pathologist. He served as physician-in-chief of the Johns Hopkins Hospital and president of the American Association of Immunologists, Association of American Physicians, and American Society for Clinical Investigation.

== Early life and education ==
Warfield Longcope was born in Baltimore, Maryland to George and Ruth (Theobald) Longcope. His mother's family had a long history of achievement in medicine, starting with Nathan Smith, the third graduate of Harvard College's medical department.

Longcope graduated from Johns Hopkins University in 1897. In 1901 he graduated from the university's medical school, part of their fifth class of students. Among the significant influences in his education were William H. Welch and William Osler. As a result of these influences, he elected to concentrate on pathology in his post-doctoral education.

== Early medical career ==
After completing medical school, Longcope took a position as the resident pathologist at Pennsylvania Hospital's Ayer Clinical Laboratory, working under the direction of Simon Flexner. By 1904, he was the laboratory director, a position he held until 1911. Between 1909 and 1911, he was also an assistant professor at the University of Pennsylvania School of Medicine. In 1911, he left to become an assistant professor at Columbia University and physician at Presbyterian Hospital; by 1914, he was the medical director.

== Wartime service ==
Longcope served in World War I as an Army physician, his active duty service beginning in August 1917 and continuing through 1919. He was part of the Office of the Surgeon General of the Army, and later consulted for the American Expeditionary Forces.

== Later career ==
At the end of his military service, Longcope returned to his positions at Columbia and Presbyterian. For a brief time in 1922, he was a professor at Cornell University Medical School, before returning to his alma mater later that year as director of the Johns Hopkins University medical department and physician-in-chief of Johns Hopkins Hospital. Longcope was one of the founding members of the American Society for Clinical Investigation, and served as the organization's president in 1919. He was the president of the American Association of Immunologists from 1935 to 1936, having already served as one of their councillors from 1934 to 1935 (and again from 1936 to 1940). From 1945 to 1946 he was president of the Association of American Physicians.

== Awards and honors ==
During his long career, Longcope accumulated a number of awards. He was made a Fellow of the American Academy of Arts and Sciences in 1923, was awarded the Bronze Medal of American Roentgen Ray Society in 1937, became a member of the National Academy of Sciences in 1943, and was awarded the Kober Medal in 1948.

== Research interests ==
From the earliest phases of his medical education, Longcope had a particular interest in bacteriology and pathological anatomy. He spent much of his career studying antigen-antibody mechanisms. During his time with the military, he studied influenza and hemolytic streptococcus, both of which were major wartime concerns. He was one of the researchers on Dimercaprol ("British Anti-Lewisite") during World War II, and also encouraged its postwar civilian use as an antidote to metal poisoning. In total, he published 125 papers, including a major one after his retirement on sarcoidosis. Longcope was noted for keeping files on his "favorite" diseases, with case notes, photographs, and other information for each; he kept these files current up through the final weeks of his life.

== Family ==
Longcope married Janet Percy Dana in 1915. She was the daughter of Paul Dana, editor of the New York Sun. They had four children, two boys and two girls. Continuing the family tradition, one of the sons became a physician as well. Christopher Longcope (1928–2003), one of Warfield Longcope's two sons, received his M.D. from Johns Hopkins Medical School and became a professor of medicine at the University of Massachusetts Medical School.

Warfield Longcope retired from active practice in 1946. He died of emphysema in 1953, at his farm in Lee, Massachusetts.
