= Brooklandwood =

Historic house in Maryland, United States

- U.S. National Register of Historic Places
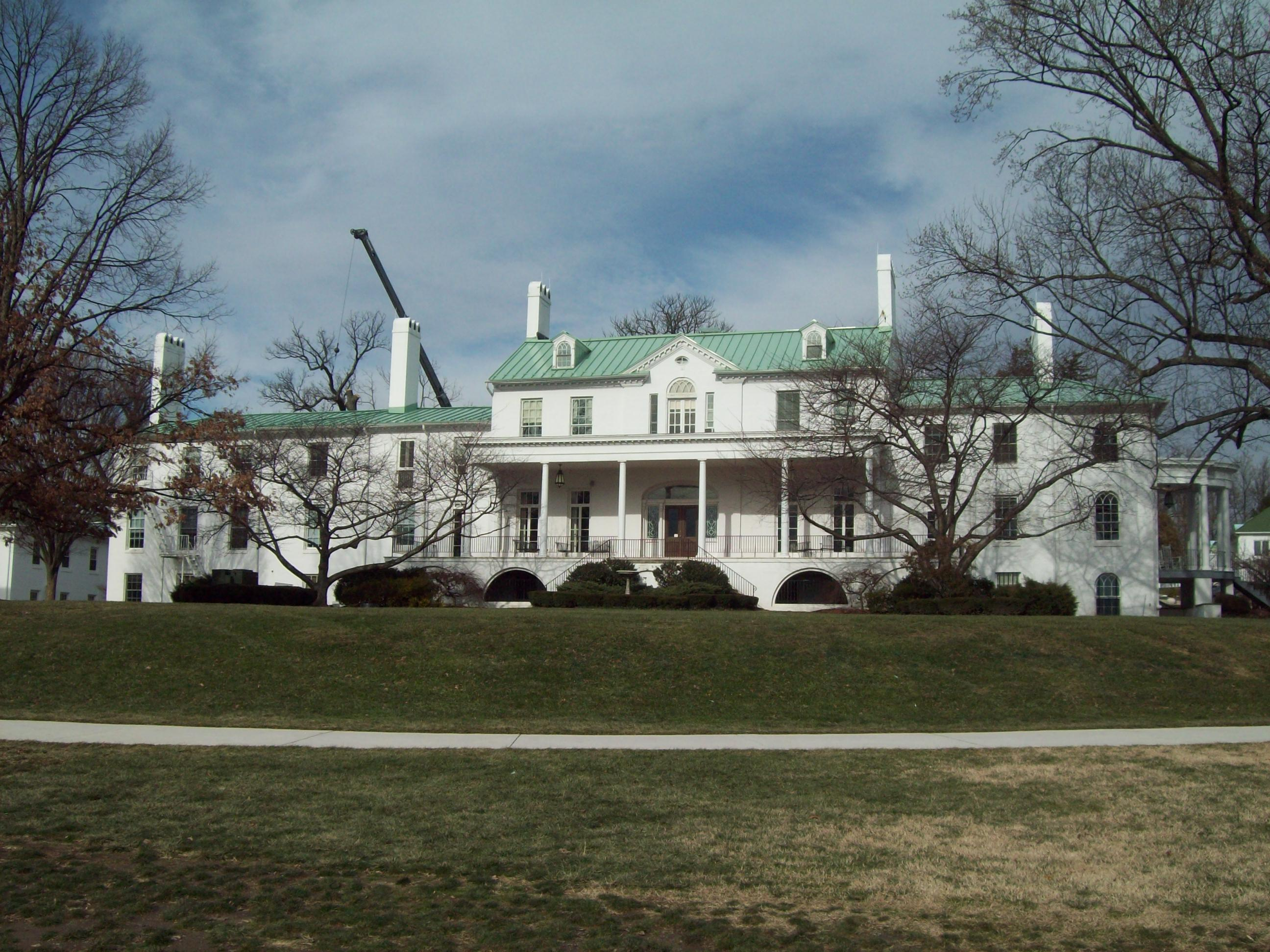
- Brooklandwood, December 2009

- Location within Maryland Location within the United States
- Location: 11152 Falls Road (MD 25), Brooklandville, Maryland
- Coordinates: 39°25′50″N 76°40′36″W
- Area: 62 acres (25 ha)
- Built: 1790
- Architectural style: Early Republic, Palladian
- NRHP reference No.: 72000567
- Added to NRHP: February 11, 1972

Brooklandwood, or Brookland Wood, is a historic home located in Brooklandville, Baltimore County, Maryland. Its grounds became developed for the St. Paul's School for Boys.

The house is a 2 1/2-story, five-bay dwelling. The central block and two later wings are brick, painted white. The central-block section is original and built about 1790, with porches and Palladian-style windows forming a symmetrical, functional unit. It was owned by Captain John Cockey and then sold to Charles Carroll of Carrollton, and several of his descendants: Carroll's daughter and son-in-law Mary and Richard Caton, parents of Emily Caton, who married John MacTavish, the British Consul to Baltimore in the early 1800s. It was also owned by Isaac E. Emerson, the inventor of Bromo-Seltzer.

It was listed on the National Register of Historic Places on February 11, 1972.

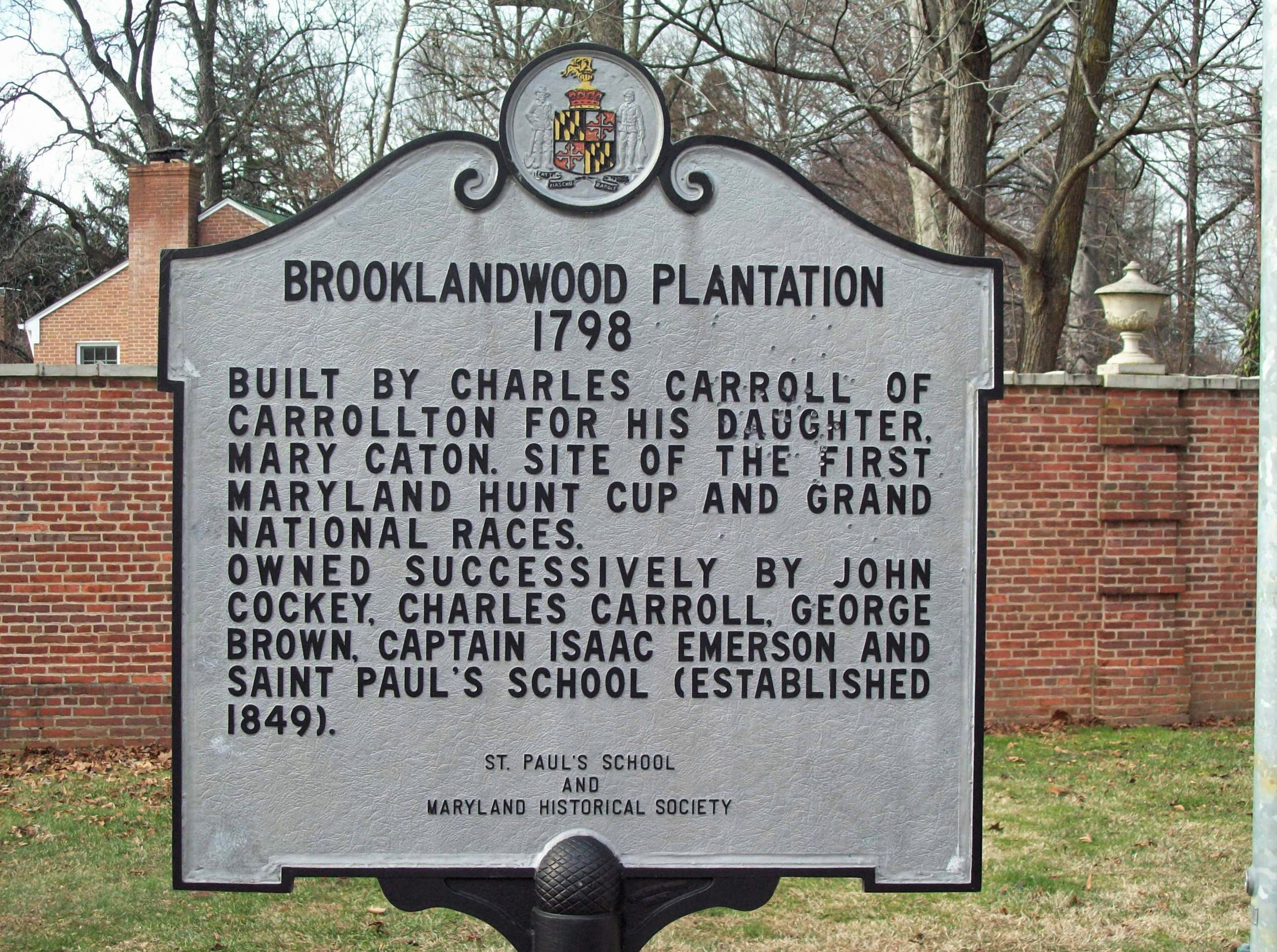
Brooklandwood Historical Marker

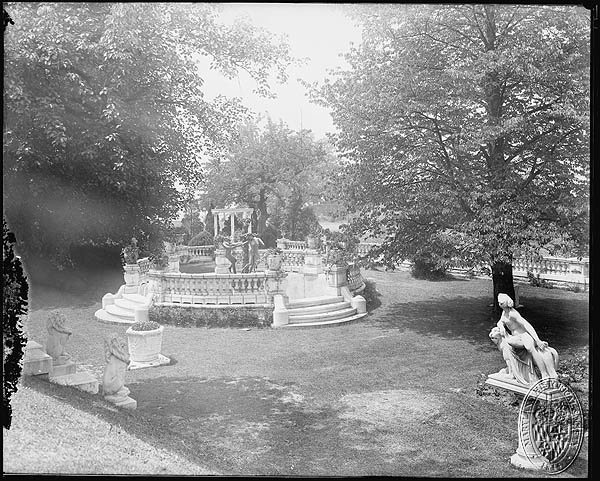
Brooklandwood statuary
