= Fanny Allen =

American Catholic Nun (1784-1819)

Frances Margaret "Fanny" Allen RHSJ
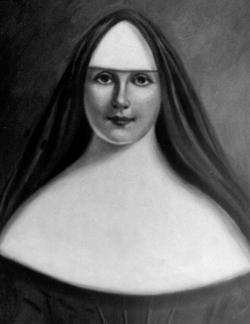

Personal life
- Born: Frances Margaret Allen; November 13, 1784 Sunderland, Vermont Republic
- Died: September 10, 1819 (aged 34) Montreal, Lower Canada

Religious life
- Religion: Catholic
- Order: Religious Hospitallers of St. Joseph
- Profession: May 18, 1811

Frances Margaret "Fanny" Allen, RHSJ (November 13, 1784 – September 10, 1819) was the first New England woman to become a Catholic nun. The daughter of Revolutionary War officer Ethan Allen, she converted to Catholicism and entered the Montreal convent of the Religious Hospitallers of St. Joseph in 1811.

== Biography ==
=== Early life ===
Born on November 13, 1784, Frances Margaret Allen was the eldest child of the American patriot Ethan Allen and his second wife, Frances Montresor Brush Buchanan Allen. She was born in a house built by her father on the side of the Batten Kill in Sunderland, Vermont. Her family moved to various settlements in Vermont in her youth, and Frances, who was called Fanny, spent her childhood in Burlington, Westminster, and Swanton.

She was four years old when her father died suddenly on February 12, 1789. After her father's death, the family moved to Westminster to live with her maternal grandmother. It was in Westminster that Allen's mother married Dr. Jabez Penniman in 1793. Penniman cared for Fanny as if she were his own daughter, showing a great interest in her education.

In her youth, Allen reported having a mysterious experience that would later be a major factor in her decision to enter Catholic religious life. The story, in her own words, goes as follows:

When I was twelve years old, I was walking one day on the banks of the river which flowed not very far from our house. The water, although very clear, rolled by in torrents. Suddenly I beheld emerging from the river an animal more resembling a monster than a fish, for it was of extraordinary size and horrid shape. It was coming directly toward me and sent a chill of terror through me. What aggravated my peril was that I could not turn away from this monster. I seemed paralyzed and rooted to the ground. While I was in this torturing situation, I saw advancing toward me a man with a venerable and striking countenance, wearing a brown cloak and carrying a staff in his hand. He took hold of my arm gently and gave me strength to move while he said most kindly to me: "My child, what are you doing here? Hasten away." I then ran as fast as I could. When I was some distance off, I turned to look at this venerable man, but I could see him nowhere.

Upon returning home, Allen described the experience to her mother, who sent a servant to look for the man to thank him for his kindness. The man was never located.

=== Conversion ===
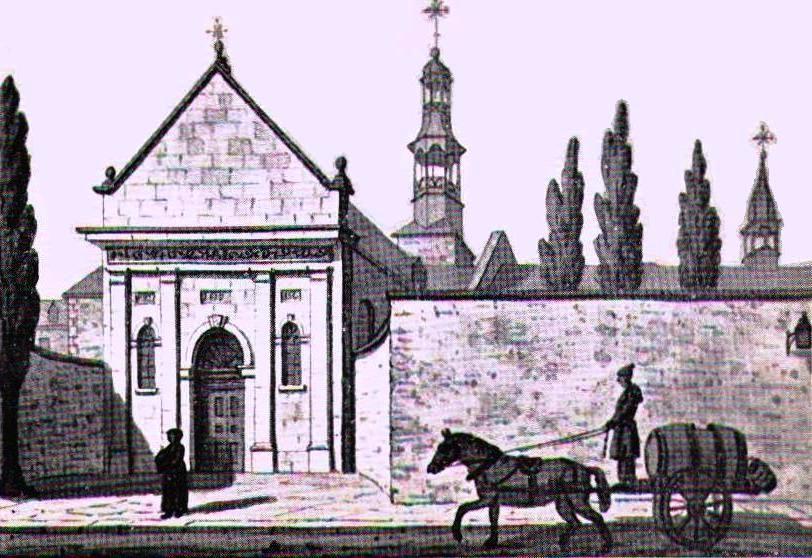
A sepia print by John Drake of the Hôtel-Dieu de Montréal in 1826. Allen would make her profession as a nun here on May 18, 1811.

Allen was educated at Middlebury Seminary, and had an interest in science. She was not raised with a high regard for religion, and no consideration of religion was made in her education. Her father was a skeptic of organized religion in the same philosophical camp as Thomas Paine, and her step-father regarded the affectations of the religious people of his time and era as "pretentious".

In 1801, Penniman was appointed Collector of Customs for Vermont, at which time the family moved to Swanton. Four years later, when she was 21, Allen asked permission of her parents to go to Montreal. She stated that her intention was to continue her education by studying French, but her true motive was perhaps an intellectual curiosity about the beliefs and practices of the Catholic Church, even though she had never heard anything but disparaging vilifications of it. Her parents consented to sending her to Montreal, but first required her to be baptized by the Rev. Daniel Barber, an Anglican priest of Claremont, New Hampshire, and later to be a convert to Catholicism himself. Allen, who was strongly irreligious at the time, strongly objected, but consented in order to please her mother. However, she was scolded by Barber for laughing during the entire ceremony.

She became a pupil of the Sisters of the Congregation of Notre Dame at Montreal in 1807. Allen would soon convert to Catholicism, her conversion reportedly effected by a supernatural experience. The story goes that a nun asked Allen to place some flowers on the altar of the congregation's chapel, also asking that she make a prayer in recognition of the Real Presence of Jesus Christ in the tabernacle. Allen smiled at the request, and had no intention of honoring it. When Allen attempted to step into the sanctuary, however, she supposedly found herself unable to do so, as if she were blocked by some invisible force. After three futile attempts, she was filled with conviction of the Real Presence, and fell upon her knees in adoration. She did not immediately inform her teachers of this event, however, but waited some time before making a confession and a formal rejection of her Protestantism.

Allen received instruction in the Catholic faith and was re-baptized by the Rev. L. Saulnier, a parish priest in Montreal, since it was determined that her earlier baptism was invalid due to a lack of proper disposition, namely her ability to properly assent to the sacrament. It was at the reception of her First Communion that she fixed upon the idea of entering the religious life as a nun.

Her conversion to Catholicism was regarded as remarkable in Vermont, an area in which the Catholic Church had scarcely any influence at that time in history. Her conversion was all the more remarkable for her decision to become a nun as well. In reaction, her parents promptly withdrew her from the convent and attempted to distract her from the idea of religious life with lavish parties and handsome suitors. They even enlisted the help of a "High Church" Episcopal acquaintance to attempt to convince her that the Episcopal church would be a better match for her. All of these attempts at dissuading Allen had little effect, even prompting a friend of hers to remark, "It is astonishing how terribly in earnest Fanny is! She certainly believes in the Catholic religion with all her heart, though how a person with her extensive information and splendid talents can receive such absurdities is a puzzle to common sense!" Allen did, however, agree to her parents' request that she would wait a year before taking action, during which time she lived with them in Swanton.

As soon as that year ended, she returned to Montreal, but had not determined what religious congregation she wanted to join. When Allen visited the Hôtel-Dieu de Montréal with her mother, she was immediately struck by a painting that was hanging above the altar of the chapel there. The image was a representation of the Holy Family. Allen, amazed, remarked to her mother that the image of Saint Joseph matched exactly the appearance of the man who had saved her from the river creature at the age of 12. "Oh great St. Joseph," she exclaimed, "it is indeed you, the foster father of Jesus, the husband of Mary, who came to save me from that monster, to preserve me from death that I might enjoy the benefit of knowing, loving, and serving my God. It is right here, mother, it is with the sisters of St. Joseph that I wish to spend the rest of my life."

=== Religious life ===
Since Allen was at first unknown to the Mother Superior as she entered the Hôtel-Dieu, Allen was asked to spend a year at the boarding school of the Sisters of the Congregation before being received into the novitiate of the Religious Hospitallers of St. Joseph. Allen consented, and a year passed before she was received into the novitiate on September 29, 1808. Her parents came to some peace of mind at their daughter's decision after a visit in the spring of 1809. They had previously imagined that Catholic convents were "no better than so many prisons", but were pleased to see that Allen was happy at the convent. They also took notice of the happiness of the nuns there, and congratulated her on her choice of life. When she made her religious profession on May 18, 1811, the Catholic Encyclopedia reports that "the convent chapel was thronged, many American friends coming to witness the strange spectacle of Ethan Allen's daughter becoming a Catholic nun."

She spent the rest of her life as a nurse, working in the hospital's apothecary. She also served as an interpreter for English-speaking patients and cared for wounded combatants in the War of 1812. According to contemporary reports, Sister Allen was often called upon by Americans visiting Montreal, "begging to see the lovely young nun of the Hotel-Dieu, who was the first daughter New England had given to the sacred enclosure and whom they claimed as belonging especially to them through her connection with their favorite revolutionary hero." These interruptions were apparently so frequent that Sister Allen eventually requested the permission of her Mother Superior to decline all such calls, except those made by friends from her youth.

She died of complications from a lung disease on September 10, 1819, at the Hôtel-Dieu, aged 34, and was buried under the chapel there.

== Appearance and personality ==
Mrs. Julia Smalley of Swanton, the daughter of a personal acquaintance of Allen, gave the following description of her:

Fanny... inherited much of the energy and decision of [her father's] character, controlled by womanly gentleness. In person she was rather above than below medium height, and of uncommon beauty in form and feature. Her complexion was fair, her eyes dark blue, with a singular depth and calmness of expression, while the dignity and ease of her manners gave quiet evidence to the refinement and loveliness of her character. In the qualities which adorn the domestic and social circle, she was unsurpassed.

== Legacy ==
The Fanny Allen Hospital in Colchester, Vermont, built in 1879 and run by her order, the Religious Hospitallers of St. Joseph, was named in her honor, as was Fanny Allen School of Nursing, which was later known as Fanny Allen Memorial School of Practical Nursing.. This hospital, now a part of the University of Vermont Medical Center, is the primary care center in Vermont. Near the campus of this merged hospital there is still a cemetery which retains the Fanny Allen name, where nuns associated with the Hospitallers are buried.
