= Charles MacTavish =

American landowner and politician in Ireland (1818–1868)

Charles Carroll MacTavish

Member of Parliament for Dundalk
- In office August 6, 1847 – March 18, 1848
- Preceded by: Daniel O'Connell Jnr
- Succeeded by: William Torrens McCullagh

Personal details
- Born: January 18, 1818 Maryland, United States
- Died: March 12, 1868 (aged 50) Baltimore, Maryland
- Resting place: Baltimore, Maryland
- Party: Repeal Association
- Parent(s): John MacTavish, Emily Caton MacTavish
- Education: Stonyhurst College

Charles Carroll MacTavish (January 18, 1818 – March 12, 1868), sometimes known as Carroll MacTavish, was an American landowner who briefly served as an Irish Repeal Association politician in the United Kingdom.

MacTavish was the great-grandson of Charles Carroll of Carrollton, an American founding father, and was born into a wealthy family in Maryland. He was named for his great-grandfather, who had a strong influence on his early life, ensuring that he was brought up devoutly Catholic. His mother's family had married into English aristocracy, and with their support, MacTavish began a career with the British diplomatic service. In the 1840s, he became interested in politics, and stood for election as a candidate in an Irish seat at the 1847 general election. He was narrowly elected, but the result was overturned following an election petition, which challenged both the conduct of the election and his status as a British subject. The committee ruled that some votes had been cast illegally, but did not find that it was proven he was ineligible to sit.

MacTavish later returned to America, where he married a daughter of General Winfield Scott and took over a large family plantation in Maryland with around fifty slaves. He remained a slaveholder until the end of the Civil War, when he sold the estate, though he was considered a loyal Union citizen. He died in 1868.

== Early life ==
MacTavish's father, John MacTavish, was a Scottish fur trader with the North West Company in Canada, and was of the Garthbeg branch of Clan MacTavish. He married Emily Caton, the daughter of Richard Caton, a wealthy Baltimore merchant, in 1816, and they took up residence in Montreal; through her mother, Emily Caton was the granddaughter of Charles Carroll of Carrollton, a signatory of the Declaration of Independence. Their first child, Charles Carroll MacTavish, was born in January 1818 in Maryland, while his mother was visiting her parents. Emily's sisters had married into the British aristocracy; MacTavish's uncles by marriage included Richard Wellesley, 1st Marquess Wellesley, former Governor-General of India, Foreign Secretary, and later Lord Lieutenant of Ireland, and Francis D'Arcy-Osborne, 7th Duke of Leeds.

In 1819, the family moved to Maryland, where John MacTavish was appointed as consul-general to the United States in 1829, and later consul for Maryland and the District of Columbia. From 1832, they resided at Carrollton Hall, a short distance from Baltimore, an estate gifted by his great-grandfather.

MacTavish and his siblings were raised in a strongly Catholic environment, influenced heavily by the wishes of their great-grandfather. He was a pupil at Stonyhurst College in England, a Jesuit school, between 1830 and 1834. During his time at Stonyhurst, he attended the coronation of William IV. At this time, he was interested in a military career, though this did not come to pass. In 1834, his uncle Wellesley, then Lord-Lieutenant in Dublin, met him on a visit to Ireland and wrote that he "is receiving the education of a Catholic priest and both his understanding and his person will soon decline".

In 1839, MacTavish left America to travel to Russia and then onward to the United Kingdom, with ambitions of a diplomatic career. He was presented at court in London in April 1839 by Andrew Stevenson, the American ambassador. He lived for some time in Paris, where he perfected his French, and then with the support of his uncle, the Marquess of Wellesley, was attached to the British diplomatic service. He is recorded as being associated with Henry Wellesley's embassy to the Ottoman Empire, which would suggest he went to Constantinople around 1845. In 1845, his sister Mary married Henry George Howard, the youngest son of the Earl of Carlisle; at the time, Howard was an attaché to the British Embassy in Paris.

== Election controversy ==
After living for some years in the United Kingdom, MacTavish became involved in Irish politics, and stood for election to the House of Commons in the 1847 general election, as a Repeal Association candidate in Dundalk. At the hustings, his proposer drew a link to his great-grandfather, noting that as "Charles Carroll was instrumental in effecting American independence, so he hoped that Charles Carroll MacTavish would yet be instrumental in achieving the independence of Ireland"; MacTavish said that he "long had his eye on Ireland, and though an American by birth, was an Irishman in feeling". He was declared elected, polling 124 votes against 121 for William McCullagh, the Whig candidate. A full list of electors (and some non-voting supporters) was published as a poster by MacTavish's supporters shortly after the election.

However, an election petition was raised to challenge the result, and was adjudicated in March 1848 by a committee composed of five MPs from across the political spectrum. The main challenge was that MacTavish was legally an alien – an American citizen rather than a British subject, and so barred from sitting in Parliament. In addition, it was alleged that he had failed to properly declare his qualification to sit, and that he and his agents had been guilty of bribing electors.

On the main challenge, the opposition argued strongly that the various statutes which would make him a British subject had been passed before the 1801 Act of Union, and did not extend to Ireland; under existing Irish law, which had not been altered since the Union, he would need to be born to parents both of whom were British subjects. This point was contested over the first three days, with testimony taken from his father and a copy of an American passport provided as evidence, and a debate about whether his mother had in fact been born in England. Eventually, the parliamentary committee concluded that "it has not been proved that the sitting member is an alien disqualified from law from sitting in Parliament".

However, his victory was short-lived; over the third and fourth days, the hearing proceeded to examine a number of disputed votes in the election, and eventually concluded that several votes had been cast by ineligible voters. This reduced MacTavish's total below that of McCullagh, who was declared elected on March 18, 1848.

== Later life ==
Following this disappointment, MacTavish chose to return to America. In the early 1850s, he married Marcella "Ella" Scott, the youngest daughter of General Winfield Scott (later to be a candidate for president).

MacTavish acquired the Carrollton Hall estate from his parents in 1850, and sold it again in July 1864 for $100,000. The house would return to the family in the 1880s, however, when it passed to Charles Carroll, son of John Lee Carroll, a distant cousin. In 1850, he had estimated the value of his property at $50,000 in land, and in 1860, $60,000 in land and $40,000 in assets.

As owner of Carrollton Hall, MacTavish was also a slaveowner; the estate had 50 slaves in the 1850 census, and 51 in the 1860 census, while an advertisement for sale, estimated to be around 1860, included 38 slaves. He may have freed some or all of his slaves during the American Civil War – in June 1864, John Woolley, the provost marshal for the Baltimore region, enquired about his loyalty to the Union, and a local officer reported that MacTavish was a "thoroughly loyal citizen" who "gave us every facility for enrolling his slaves". No slaves were recorded in the sale that July, a few months before slavery was formally abolished in Maryland.

In 1867, following the death of his mother, he inherited the bulk of her estate, estimated at over $200,000 (approximately $3.78 million in 2025). The bequest had been made by her to fulfill a promise to her grandfather, Charles Carroll. He died on March 12, 1868.

His family continued the tradition of devout Catholicism. His youngest daughter Emily became a nun with the Order of the Visitation of Holy Mary in 1883, and her eldest sister May entered a convent in Brussels in 1887. The middle daughter, Virginia, was rumoured by gossip columnists in 1888 to be engaged to the recently widowed Henry Fitzalan-Howard, 15th Duke of Norfolk; however, she never married.

Parliament of the United Kingdom
Preceded by Daniel O'Connell	Member of Parliament for Dundalk; 1847–1848	Succeeded by William McCullagh
