= USS Allegan =

Cargo ship of the United States Navy

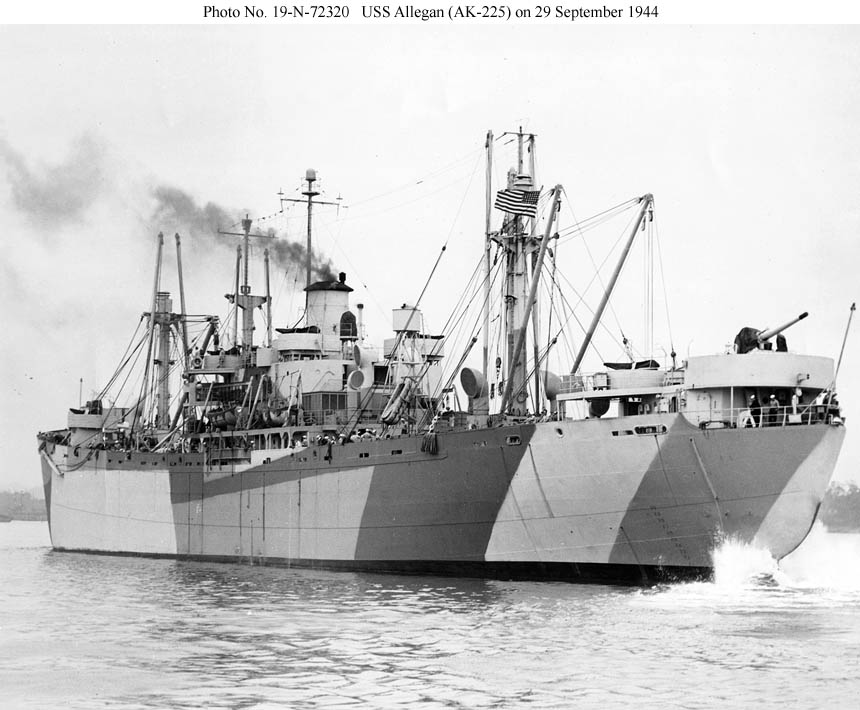
- USS Allegan (AK-225) underway in Chesapeake Bay off her conversion yard at Baltimore, Maryland, 29 September 1944. She and the other late addition to this class, USS Appanoose (AK-226), were acquired to serve as pontoon assembly ships but initially had no distinctive external fittings for this purpose. Her camouflage is Measure 32 Design 1F.

History

United States
- Name: Van Lear Black; Allegan
- Namesake: Van Lear Black; Allegan County, Michigan
- Ordered: as a type (EC2-S-C1 hull), MCE hull 2416, SS Van Lear Black
- Builder: Bethlehem-Fairfield Shipyard, Inc., Baltimore, Maryland
- Laid down: 21 December 1943
- Launched: 21 January 1944
- Sponsored by: Mrs. Van Lear Black
- Acquired: 7 August 1944
- Commissioned: 21 September 1944
- Decommissioned: 15 November 1945
- Stricken: 28 November 1945
- Identification: Hull symbol:AK-225
- Fate: sold November 1946 to Fordom Trading Co, New York for Cia de Nav San Leonardo S.A., Panama RP - Panamanian flag - renamed SS San Leonardo; sold in 1951 to Sociedad Nav Interamericana S.A. - Panamanian flag - renamed SS Wanderer; sold in 1955 to La Guayra Cia Nav S.A. - Panamanian flag - name retained; transferred to Liberian flag in 1956; sold in 1959 to Force Steamship Corp. - US flag - renamed SS Valiant Force; sold in 1963 to the Potomac Steamship Corp., New York - Liberian flag renamed SS Wanderer; renamed in 1963 to SS Wanderlust - same owners; sold in 1964 to Macedonian Steamship Corp - Liberian flag - renamed SS Agathopolis; sold to Japanese breakers, arrived Osaka, 30 June 1969, for scrapping

General characteristics
- Class & type: Crater-class cargo ship
- Displacement: 4,023 long tons (4,088 t) (standard); 14,550 long tons (14,780 t) (full load)
- Length: 441 ft 6 in (134.57 m)
- Beam: 56 ft 11 in (17.35 m)
- Draft: 28 ft 4 in (8.64 m)
- Installed power: 2 × Babcock & Wilcox header-type boilers, 220psi 450°; 2,500 shp (1,900 kW)
- Propulsion: 1 × Ellicott Machine Corp. triple-expansion reciprocating steam engine; double Westinghouse Main Reduction Gears; 1 × shaft
- Speed: 12.5 kn (23.2 km/h; 14.4 mph)
- Complement: 229 officers and enlisted
- Armament: 1 × 5 in (127 mm)/38 caliber dual-purpose (DP) gun; 1 × 3 in (76 mm)/50 caliber DP gun; 2 × 40 mm (1.57 in) Bofors anti-aircraft (AA) gun mounts; 6 × 20 mm (0.79 in) Oerlikon cannon AA gun mounts

USS Allegan (AK-225) was a Crater-class cargo ship commissioned by the U.S. Navy for service in World War II. She was responsible for delivering troops, goods and equipment to locations in the war zone.

== Service history ==
SS Van Lear Black was laid down under a Maritime Commission contract (MCE hull 2416) on 21 December 1943 at Baltimore, Maryland, by Bethlehem-Fairfield Shipyard; launched on 21 January 1944; sponsored by Mrs. Van Lear Black; acquired by the Navy under a bareboat charter on 7 August 1944; renamed Allegan and designated AK-225 on 12 August 1944; converted for naval service at Baltimore by the Maryland Drydock Co.; and commissioned on 21 September 1944. Following shakedown training in the Chesapeake Bay, Allegan took on a cargo of pontoons at Davisville, Rhode Island, for transportation to the Philippines. She left Davisville on 19 October and shaped a course for the Pacific Ocean. The ship transited the Panama Canal on the 30th and continued sailing westward. She reached Eniwetok on 27 November and departed that atoll on 6 December in a convoy bound for Leyte. The vessel paused en route at Ulithi before reaching Leyte on 22 December.

Allegan operated in Philippine waters in and Samar through late January 1945, discharging cargo and assembling pontoons. She successfully carried out this assignment despite being subjected to frequent enemy air attacks. The ship left the Philippines on 23 January and shaped a course for the west coast of the United States. She paused en route at Manus, Admiralty Islands, on 30 January; then sailed on for California and reached San Pedro, Los Angeles, on 23 February. There, she took on board another cargo of pontoons and got underway again on 9 March bound for Okinawa. After making brief port calls at Eniwetok and Ulithi, the vessel arrived off Okinawa on 3 May. During the next three months, she remained in the area discharging and assembling pontoons. She was subjected to frequent air attacks throughout this period and assisted in downing three enemy planes.

Allegan departed Okinawa on 5 August, bound for Pearl Harbor, Hawaii, via Saipan. She arrived in Hawaiian waters on 26 August, and stood out two days later for San Francisco, California. The vessel reached San Francisco Bay on 5 September and, after a period of voyage repairs, got underway again on 6 October bound for Hampton Roads, Virginia. After retransiting the Panama Canal, Allegan reached Norfolk, Virginia, on 27 October. She was decommissioned at Portsmouth, Virginia, on 15 November 1945; was returned to the War Shipping Administration a week later, and her name was struck from the Navy list on 28 November 1945. She had a very varied history after being released by the Navy. (See second external link below.)

== Military awards and honors ==
Allegan received one battle star for her World War II service. Her crew was eligible for the following medals and campaign ribbons:

- American Campaign Medal
- Asiatic-Pacific Campaign Medal (1)
- World War II Victory Medal
- Navy Occupation Service Medal (with Asia clasp)
- Philippines Liberation Medal
