= John MacTavish (British Consul) =

British consul (c. 1787–1852)

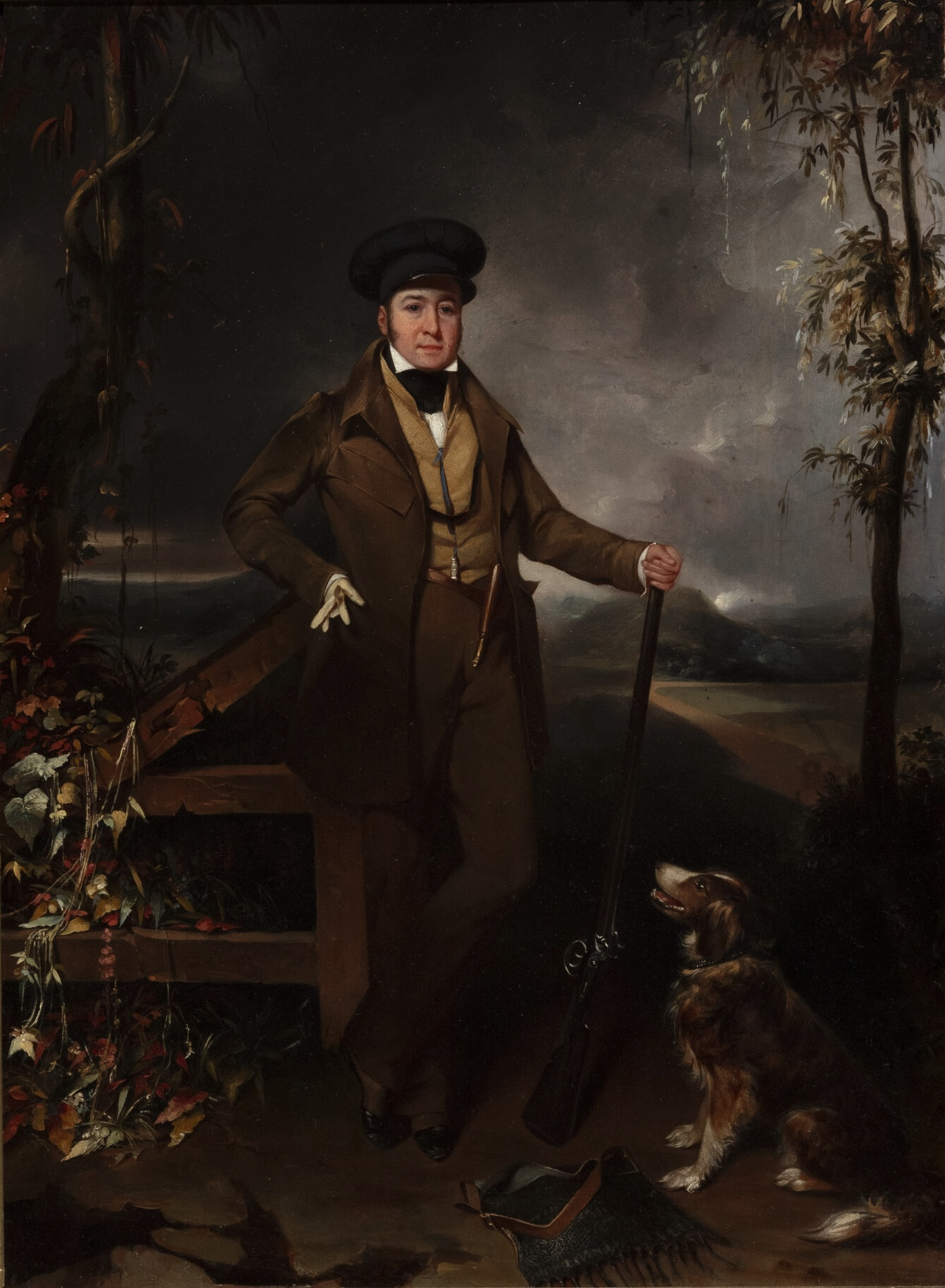
- Portrait by William James Hubard, c. 1829–1832
- Born: John Lovet MacTavish c. 1787; Stratherrick, Invernesshire, Scotland
- Died: June 21, 1852 (aged 64–65); Howard County, Maryland, U.S.
- Resting place: Green Mount Cemetery
- Occupations: Fur Trader, British Consul
- Spouse: Emily Caton (m. 1815)
- Children: 4
- Relatives: Simon McTavish (uncle)

John Lovet MacTavish (c. 1787 – June 21, 1852) was a Scots-Canadian heir to the North West Company and diplomat.

== Early life ==
MacTavish was born around 1787 in Stratherrick, Invernesshire, Scotland into Clan MacTavish. He was the son of Alexander MacTavish (1753–1788) and Marjory (née Fraser) MacTavish (1758–1828), and a nephew of Scots-Quebecer entrepreneur Simon McTavish, of the Garthbeg branch of Clan MacTavish, who took him in to raise after his father's death.

His paternal grandparents were John McTavish, tacksman of Garthbeg, and Mary (née Fraser) McTavish of Garthmore. His grandmother was said to be descended, through Simon Fraser of Dunchea and the Frasers of Foyers, from an illegitimate son of the 1st Lord Lovat — a claim of descent that has not been independently verified.

== Career ==
MacTavish served as the British Consul to the State of Maryland.

After his wedding to Emily Caton of Maryland, they lived at Brooklandwood estate in the Green Spring Valley of Baltimore County, where Emily had been born, before moving to 1,000 acres of the "finest farm land in Howard County, given as a wedding gift from his wife's grandfather and named "Folly Quarter" after the MacTavish family estate in Scotland. Folly Quarter was built near her grandfather's estate and home Doughoregan.

== Personal life ==
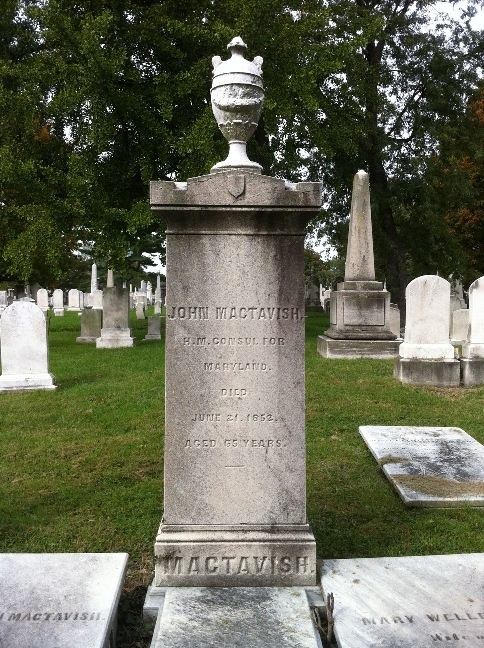
Photograph of MacTavish's grave marker at Green Mount Cemetery (October 9, 2011)

On August 15, 1815, MacTavish was married to Emily Caton, the fourth daughter of Richard Caton and Mary (née Carroll) Caton. Emily's maternal grandfather was Charles Carroll of Carrollton, the only Catholic and the longest-surviving signer of the Declaration of Independence. They were staunch Roman Catholics, members of St. Paul's Catholic Church in Baltimore County. John and Emily were the parents of four children:

- Charles Carroll MacTavish (1818–1868), who married Marcella Scott, youngest daughter of Gen. Winfield Scott.
- Mary Wellesley MacTavish (1826–1850), who married the Hon. Henry George Howard, youngest son of George Howard, 6th Earl of Carlisle.
- Alexander Simon MacTavish (1829–1863), who married Ellen Gilmor (1835–1909), sister of Harry Gilmor, Confederate officer.
- Richard Caton MacTavish (1831–1841), who died young.

Emily's three sisters Marianne, Bess, and Louisa Caton, entered British society and married into British nobility. Marianne marrying first Robert Patterson (brother of Elizabeth Patterson, the first wife of Napoleon's younger brother Jérôme Bonaparte) and second Richard Wellesley 1st Marquess Wellesley and Lord Lieutenant of Ireland (older brother of the Duke of Wellington); Bess marrying George Stafford-Jerningham, 8th Baron Stafford of Costessey Hall in Norfolk, England; and Louisa marrying first Sir Felton Hervey-Bathurst, 1st Baronet and second Francis D'Arcy Osborne, Marquess of Carmarthen (the future 7th Duke of Leeds).

MacTavish died on June 21, 1852, at age 65. His widow died on January 26, 1867, at Folly Quarter and was interred with MacTavish at Green Mount Cemetery in Baltimore, Maryland.
