= Castle Thunder (house) =

Building in Maryland, United States

Coordinates: 39.27049°N 76.73959°W

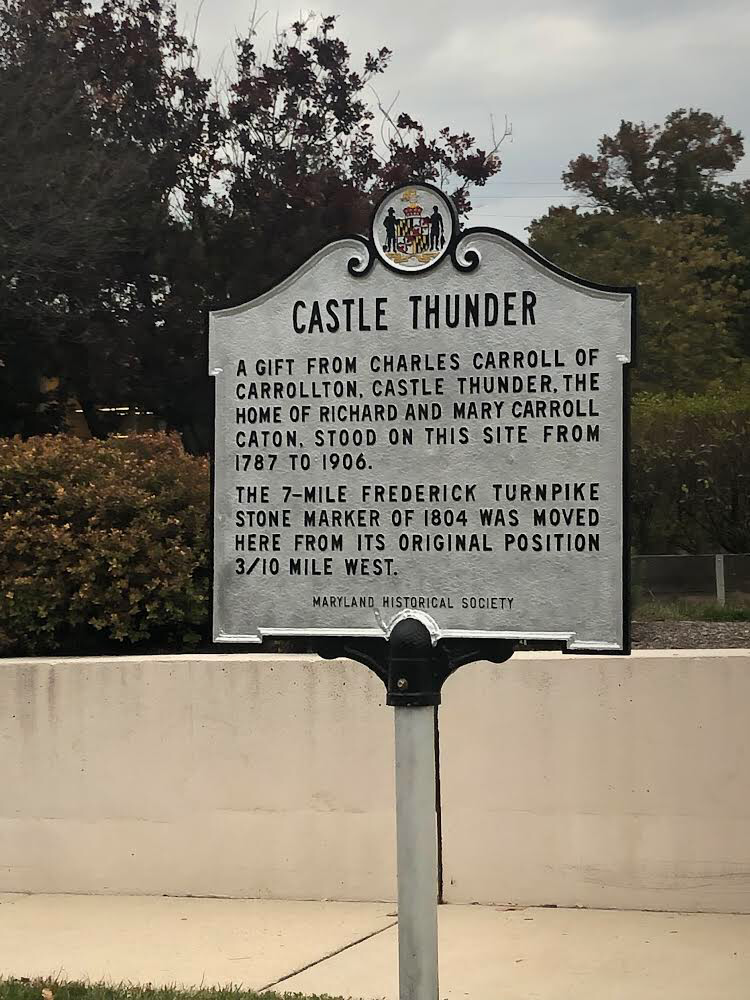
- Marker at the present location of Castle Thunder on Frederick Road
- Interactive map of the Castle Thunder area

General information
- Status: Destroyed
- Completed: 1787
- Demolished: 1907
- Owner: Charles Carroll of Carrollton

Design and construction
- Known for: Home of Richard Caton and Mary Carroll

Castle Thunder was a house constructed on Frederick Road in 1787. It belonged to Charles Carroll of Carrollton, the last surviving signer of the United States Declaration of Independence. Carroll gave the home to his daughter, Mary Carroll, and her husband, Richard Caton, after they got married at Annapolis on November 25, 1787. The home stood from 1787 to 1907. The house was used as an inn for travelers. Prior to the American Civil War, a private school was conducted at the house by Carrie Coale and her daughter. In 1907, the house was bought by former Maryland senator John Hubner and torn down to make room for the residence of Arthur C. Montell, a cashier of the First National Bank of Catonsville.

The Catonsville branch of the Baltimore County Public Library was later built at the house's location, which currently stands.

A commemorative plaque was built at the house's location in front of the library in 1966. The plaque went missing in July 2018 and was found, damaged, by the Maryland State Highway Administration. Repairs for the sign were estimated to be $350.
