= Samuel Theobald =

American ophthalmologist

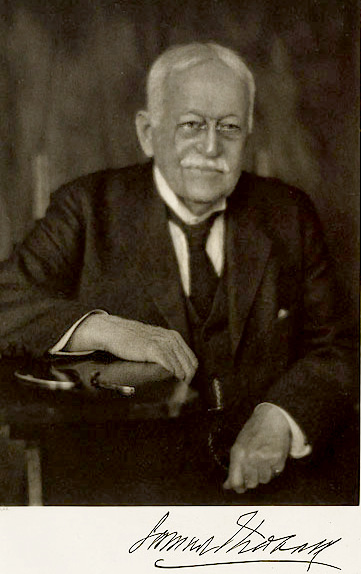
- Born: November 12, 1846; Baltimore, Maryland, U.S.
- Died: December 30, 1930 (aged 84)
- Education: University of Maryland
- Parent(s): Elisha Warfield Theobald; Sarah Frances Smith
- Relatives: Nathan Ryno Smith (grandfather)

Samuel Theobald (November 12, 1846 – December 30, 1930) was a clinical professor of ophthalmology and otology at Johns Hopkins University Medical School.

== Early life ==
Theobald was born in Baltimore, the son of Elisha Warfield Theobald and his wife Sarah Frances Smith. The elder Theobald was a medical doctor, as was Samuel's older brother, Elisha Warfield Jr. (see Smith-Theobald Family). Theobald's father died in 1851 so he was largely raised in the home of his grandfather, the surgeon Nathan Ryno Smith. Theobald had an uncle (one of N. R. Smith's sons) who was a demonstrator in anatomy at the University of Maryland as well, but this uncle died in 1859. Theobald's great-grandmother was the botanist, Frances Penniman.

Theobald completed his M.D. at the University of Maryland in 1867. He then went to study ophthalmology in London and Vienna and otology in Vienna. Among other professors, Theobald studied under Jonathan Hutchinson and Soelberg Wells.

== Career ==
In 1871, Theobald returned to Baltimore to practice these disciplines. In 1882, he was one of the founders of the Baltimore Eye, Ear and Throat Charity Hospital. In 1889 when the Johns Hopkins Hospital was opened Theobald was one of its original staff physicians. In 1893 when the Johns Hopkins Medical School opened, Theobald was a faculty member.

Theobald also contributed to the development of Theobald lacrimal probes and introduced the use of boric acid in the profession. Theobald wrote Prevalent Disease of the Eye. He served as the 14th President of the American Ophthalmological Society.

Theobald became emeritus in 1925, the same year that the Wilmer Ophthalmological Institute was founded at Johns Hopkins.

== Personal life ==
Around the time he completed his medical degree, Theobald married Caroline Dexter DeWolf (1848–1929). Together, they were the parents of:

- Marguerite F. Theobald (1868–1944), who married John Eager Lloyd (1865–1943).
- Caroline DeWolf Theobald (1869–1962), who married artist R. G. Harper Pennington in 1888. They divorced in 1913.
- Samuel Theobald Jr. (1872–1956), an artist who married Elizabeth M. Sturtevant (1876–1939).
- Frances Theobald (1875–1922), who married Stanley Howland (1875–1942).
- Mary LeBaron Theobald (1892–1917)

Theobald died on December 30, 1930.
