= Richard Caton (merchant) =

American merchant and real estate developer (1763–1845)

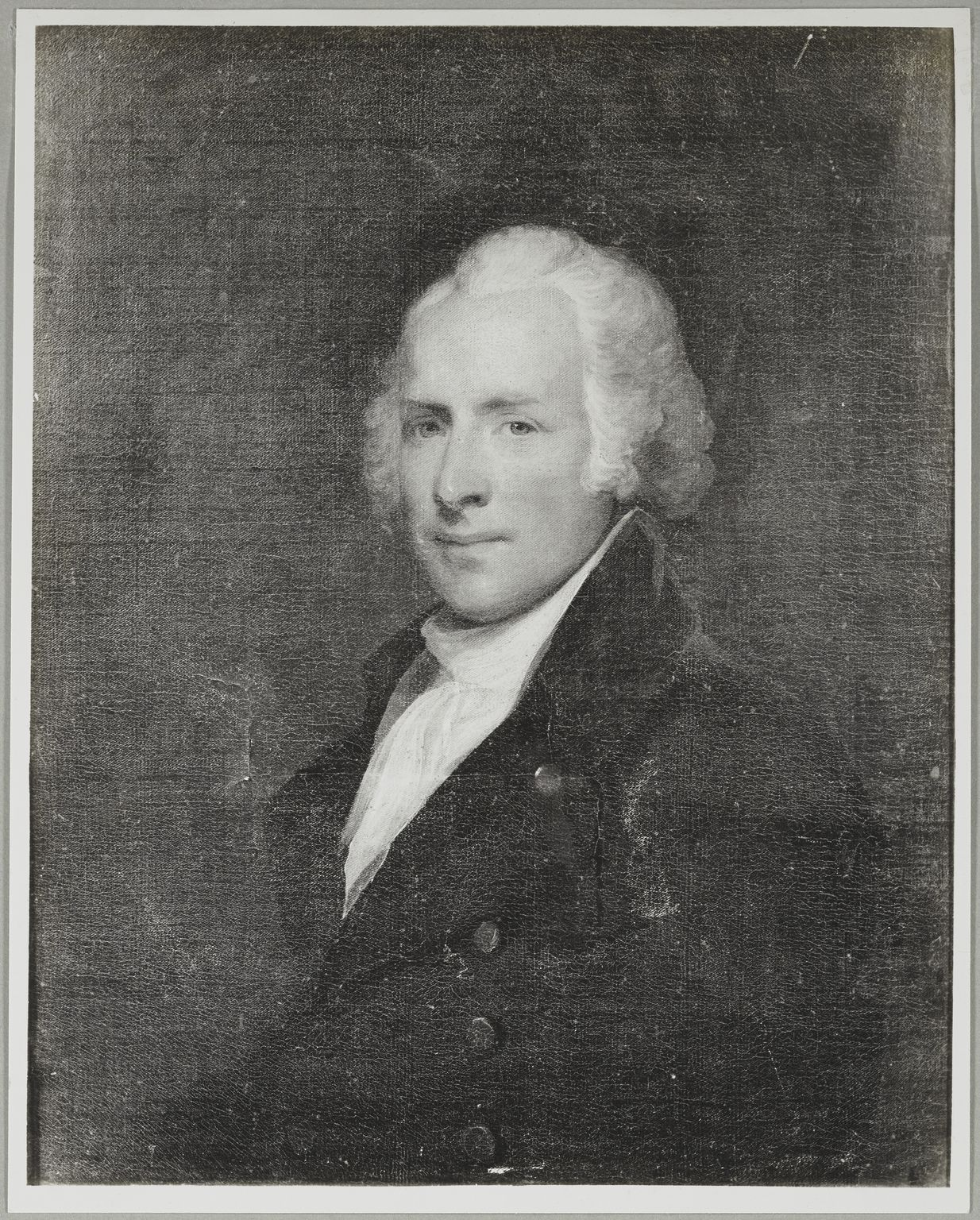
- portrait by Gilbert Stuart
- Born: 1763; Lancashire, England
- Died: May 19, 1845 (aged 81–82); Catonsville, Maryland, US
- Resting place: Green Mount Cemetery
- Occupations: Merchant, real estate developer
- Spouse: Mary Carroll (m. 1787)
- Children: Marianne Wellesley, Marchioness Wellesley; Elizabeth Stafford-Jerningham, Baroness Stafford; Louisa D'Arcy-Osborne, Duchess of Leeds; Emily MacTavish

Richard Caton (1763 – May 19, 1845) was an Englishman who became a Baltimore merchant and real estate developer. Caton married into the Carroll family of Carrollton and was the father of four daughters, all of whom married prominent Europeans, including members of the British aristocracy.

== Early life ==
Caton was born in 1763 in Lancashire, England. He was a son of John Caton and the brother of Dorothy Caton, who married William Woodville, grandparents of artist Richard Caton Woodville, himself the father of artist Richard Caton Woodville Jr.

== Career ==
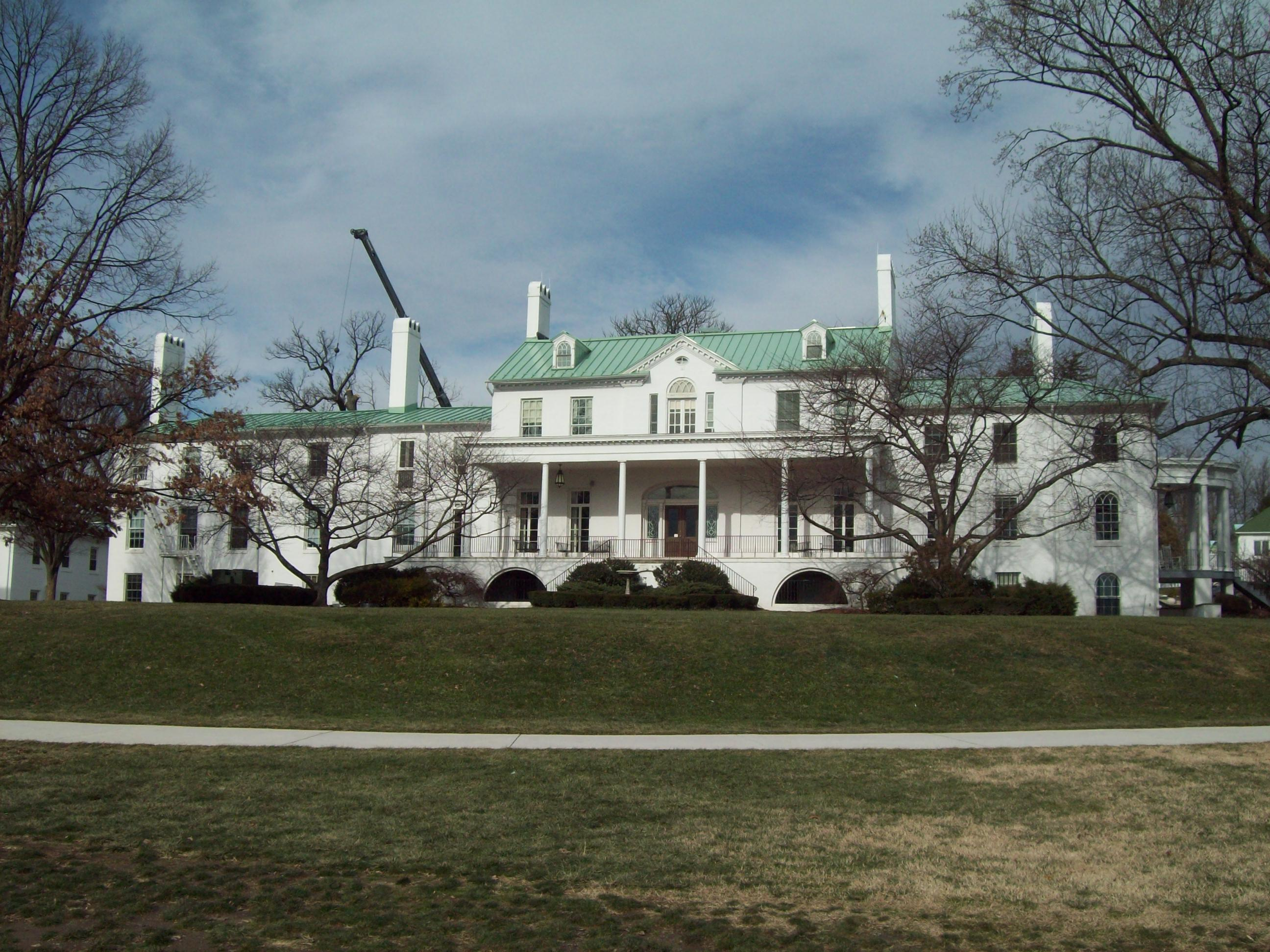
Brooklandwood in 2009

Caton left England and settled in Baltimore in 1785 as a merchant involved in the manufacture of cotton goods.

After his 1787 marriage, his father-in-law instructed him to develop area along the newly built Frederick Road, which Carroll owned land next to. He gave his name to the community and called it "Catonville", although the name was changed to "Catonsville" in the 1830s.

In 1790, Caton built Brooklandwood in Baltimore County, which was added to the National Register of Historic Places in 1972.

== Personal life ==
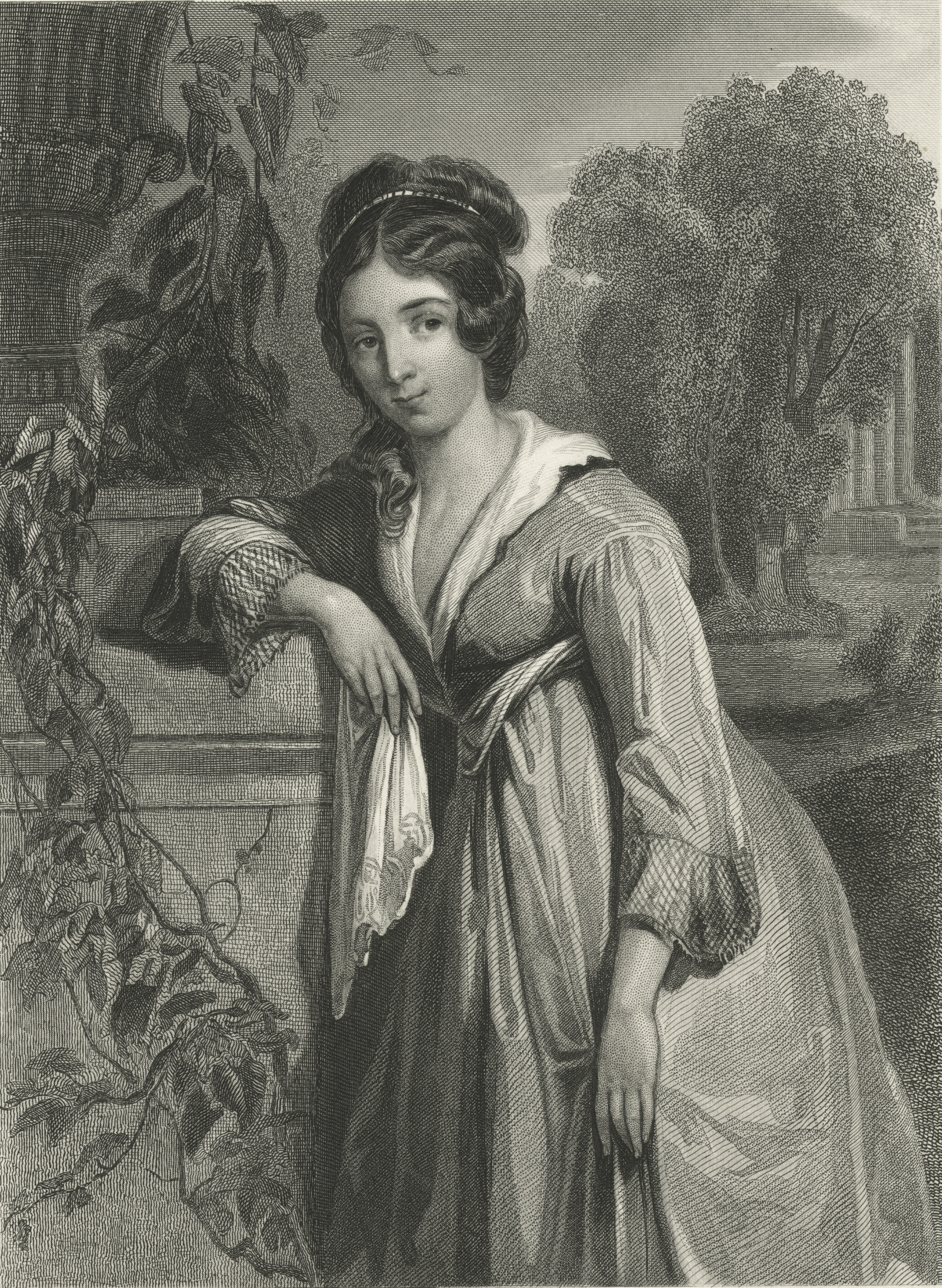
Polly Carroll

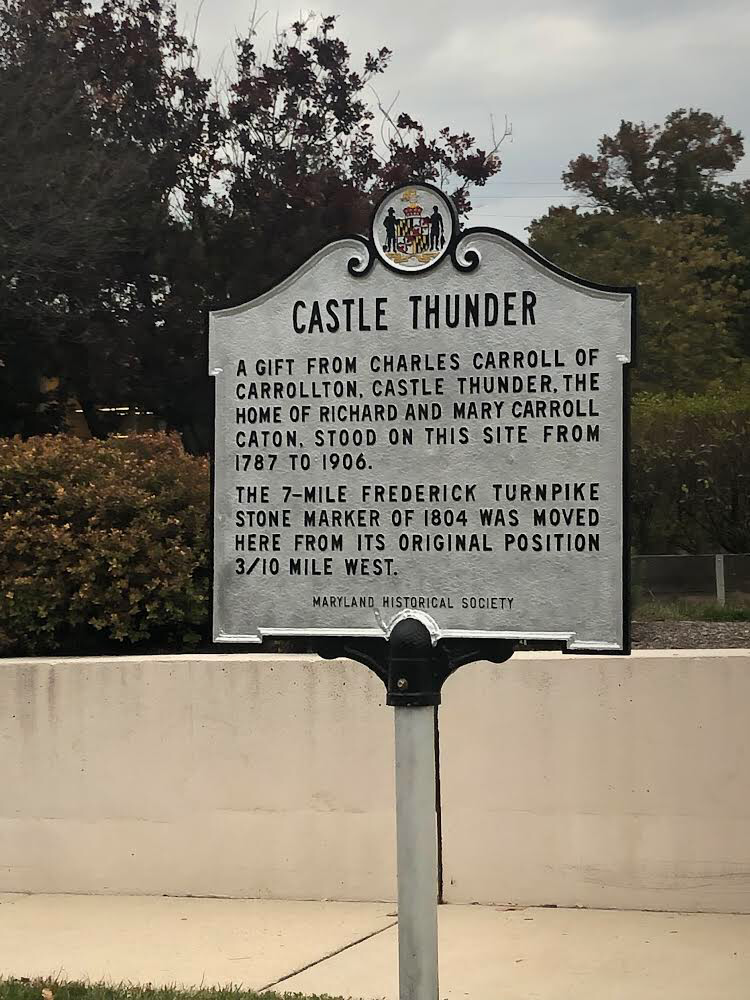
Marker at the present location of Castle Thunder on Frederick Road in Catonsville

Caton was married to Mary "Polly" Carroll (1770–1846) at Annapolis on November 25, 1787. Polly was the daughter of Charles Carroll of Carrollton, the last surviving signer of the Declaration of Independence. After the wedding, Carroll gave Polly and Richard a home, known as Castle Thunder, which stood from 1787 to 1907. Her younger sister Kitty Carroll married the lawyer and U.S. Senator Robert Goodloe Harper.

They were the parents of four daughters who survived to maturity, including:

- Marianne Caton (1788–1853), who married Robert Patterson, brother of Elizabeth Patterson (wife of Jérôme Bonaparte). After his death, she married the British statesman Richard Wellesley, 1st Marquess Wellesley, then the Lord Lieutenant of Ireland, brother of Arthur Wellesley, 1st Duke of Wellington, who was believed to have been previously Marianne's paramour.
- Elizabeth Caton (1790–1862), who married George Stafford-Jerningham, 8th Baron Stafford, son of Sir William Jerningham, 6th Baronet.
- Louisa Catherine Caton (1793–1874), who married Colonel Sir Felton Hervey-Bathurst, 1st Baronet. After his death, she married Francis D'Arcy-Osborne, Marquess of Carmatthen, later the 7th Duke of Leeds.
- Emily Caton (1794/5–1867), who married the Scottish born John McTavish, British Consul at Baltimore. They lived at Carrollton Hall, near Doughoregan Manor.

His eldest three girls were known as "The Three American Graces" due to their beauty and the fact that all married into the English aristocracy. His youngest daughter remained in Maryland and ran the family finances.

Caton died in Catonsville, Maryland, on May 19, 1845, in Baltimore and was buried at Green Mount Cemetery. At his death, he died insolvent, leaving $2,762. His widow died the following year on November 14, 1846, leaving a personal fortune of £186,000 (roughly equivalent to $19.9 million).

=== Descendants ===
Through his youngest daughter Emily, his only child to have children, he was a grandfather of four, including Charles Carroll MacTavish (1818–1868), who married Marcella Scott (a daughter of Gen. Winfield Scott); Mary Wellesley MacTavish (1826–1850), who married Hon. Henry George Howard (youngest son of George Howard, 6th Earl of Carlisle); Alexander Simon MacTavish (1829–1863), who married Ellen Gilmor; and Richard Caton MacTavish (1831–1841), who died young.

== Legacy ==
- Catonsville, Maryland, was named in his honor.
- Caton Avenue in the city of Baltimore, Maryland, was named in his honor.
- Caton, New York (in Steuben County, New York, near the Genesee River) was named in his honor.
