= Frances Montresor Buchanan Allen Penniman =

American botanist

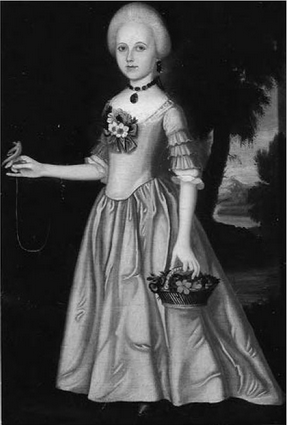
Frances Montresor (1771)

Frances Montresor Buchanan Allen Penniman (April 4, 1760 – 1834) was an American botanist and a figure in the American Revolution. She was remembered for her gardening skills and knowledge of botany. The specimens in the herbaria of Penniman and her daughter Adelia preserved at the University of Vermont's Pringle Herbarium are among the oldest representing plants of the state of Vermont.

== Early life and education ==
Frances Montresor was born April 4, 1760, in New York City, the illegitimate daughter of captain John Montresor, a British army engineer . (Note: There are alternate accounts regarding her name at birth and her father's name. In 1913, The Vermonter wrote that Dr. Samuel Theobald of Baltimore, a great-grandson of Penniman, discovered through church records in Scoharie, New York that her name at birth was Frances Montesque, and that her father was a Monte Montesque. The father's name has alternately been referred to as Montezuma or Montuzan or Montresor.) Her mother, Anna Schoolcraft, died in 1762, or 1766 in childbirth. Anna was the daughter of James Calcraft, (Note: Penniman's grandfather, James Calcraft, changed the surname at some time to Schoolcraft.) a veteran British artillerist, who had also served with reputation under the Duke of Marlborough, and came to the United States after the treaty of Utrecht, with the exalted notions of the part he had borne in the field, and of the reign of Queen Anne, under whose banners he had served.

After Anna's death, her sister, Margaret, (Note: Brush married Margaret Calcraft (Schoolcraft), not Elizabeth as mentioned.) became Penniman's new mother. Margaret married Colonel Crean Brush of the British army, and they had one child. Penniman became Brush's step-daughter. (Note: Crean Brush probably adopted Penniman because Ethan Allen referred to Penniman as "Miss Brush" when he first met her at the Wall residence.)

Brush and his wife and stepdaughter came to Westminster, Vermont, in 1771, to look after some 20,000 acres (8,100 ha) of land that he claimed in the Connecticut valley, and possibly to win distinction that he could not so easily gain in New York. He was soon appointed by the Province of New York Clerk and Surrogate of Cumberland Co., the first county established in the New Hampshire Grants, later divided into Windsor and Windham Counties. A brilliant orator, and one who cut a large figure in the little community, Brush was yet entirely unscrupulous and a bitter Tory. He was sent as representative from the county to the New York Assembly and was in high repute there. He was one of two who drew up the Governor's proclamation putting a price of £100 on the heads of Ethan Allen and Remember Baker, little dreaming that Allen would live to become the husband of his step-daughter. It was perhaps because his Toryism had made him too obnoxious to his Vermont neighbors, that in 1775, he was offering his services to Gen. Gage of Boston, from whom he received a commission. Penniman was a girl in her teens during the family's sojourn in Westminster and probably remained there after her step-father went to Boston. That she was on good terms with him, is indicated by a clause of his will made while he was imprisoned in Boston, which gave to her one-third of his property.

== Career ==
=== Mrs. Buchanan ===
Penniman had been engaged, previous to her first marriage, to a British officer who died attempting to cross the Hudson River in a small boat in a storm. In early 1777, at the age of 16, Penniman married Capt. John Buchanan, a British army officer who was killed shortly thereafter in service of the King's Loyal Rangers. Their only child died before 1784. After her husband's death, she was again living with her mother and step-father.

Colonel Brush died in January 1778. Margaret then married Edward Wall, and with Penniman, the family removed to Westminster, Vermont. The location chosen by him for his residence was one of the most beautiful in that section of the fertile valley of the Connecticut River. The settlement in that town was one of the oldest and best cultivated in the State; and the society of that portion of the new district, which had originally been settled as part of the New Hampshire Grants, excelled, as it preceded others, in comforts and refinement. Such was the wealth and position of Mr. Wall, that he spared no expense in the education of his step-daughter, Penniman, who was sent to the capital of New England to complete her education.

Penniman was 18 when Ethan Allen, freed from imprisonment in the Tower of London, returned to North America. "I should like," said Penniman, one evening in a mixed company in her step-father's parlor, "above all things to see this Mr. Allen, of whom we hear such incredible things." This saying reached the ears of Allen, who soon after paid a visit to the house of Mr. Wall, and was introduced to Penniman. There was a mutual and agreeable surprise, both manifestly pleased with the tone of thought and conversation, which ran on with a natural flow, and developed traits of kindred sympathies of intellect and feeling. It was late in the evening before Mr. Allen rose. He had not failed to observe the interest his conversation had excited in Penniman. "And now," said he, as he stood erect before her, and was about to depart—" and now, Miss Brush, allow me to ask, how do you like this Mr. Allen?'"

=== Mrs. Allen ===
In 1784, when Penniman was 24, and still Frances Montresor Buchanan, she was living with her sister, Margaret and step-father, Mr. Wall, in Westminster. He was probably attempting to recover some of the lost possessions of the family. But Brush's vast acres had been sequestered to the state; even his library and furniture had been scattered. Gen. Ethan Allen, who had frequent occasion to visit Westminster, decided to marry Frances. Gen. Allen was at this time a widower of 47, with three or four children. On February 16, Gen. Allen entered Margaret's apartment, and found Frances in a morning gown, standing on a chair, arranging china on the shelves of a china-closet. After a few words of greeting, he said to her, "Fanny, if we are ever to be married, now is the time, for I am on my way to Arlington." "Very well," she replied, "if you will give me time to get my josie." (Note: A josie was a double cape used as an outside garment.) In a very short time she was ready, and together they entered the breakfast-room where a group of judges were sitting. Chief-Justice Robinson was asked by Allen to perform the ceremony. To Robinson's astonished question "When?" the answer was "Now." The judge suggested that it was a matter of importance which required due consideration, to which Allen replied, implying that with such a bride long consideration was unnecessary. The ceremony was performed, interrupted at one point by Allen, who when called upon to promise "agreeable to the law of God," exclaimed after a glance out the window, "The law of God as written in the Book of Nature? Yes, go on." The ceremony concluded, the bride's trunk and guitar-case were placed in the sleigh and they left for their home in Arlington.

Penniman must have had abundant opportunity to know Allen's character. It would seem that she turned against the Loyalism of her step-father to sympathize with the Patriot cause during the Revolutionary War. But though she doubtless admired Ethan Allen's bravery, it is said that she was repelled by his rough manners and his tincture of infidelity, and possibly by his family of children, and hesitated for some time before yielding to his wooing. However, after their marriage she had great influence over him though she could not entirely cure him of the convivial habits common to the period. This is illustrated by the story of his watch which she insisted must be found every morning hanging on a certain nail as evidence that he had returned home the night before in a condition to make connection between the nail and the ring of his watch. In the spring of 1787, the Allens removed to Burlington, Vermont, he having purchased the farm later known as the Van Ness farm north of the city, still later converted into Ethan Allen Park. They spent the first few months in the family of a Mr. Collins at "The Bay," as the little settlement on the Lake was called, where there were then only three or four families. Here, their younger son Hannibal was born.

Penniman was educated from early life to disbelieve in the capacity or general intelligence of the masses for efficient self-government. All her preconceived notions were nurtured in favor of the British Constitution as developed by Magna Charta, and administered by a king and ministers responsible to the nation; which form of government she believed to be above all comparison the best in the world. Yet, in spite of this, during the American revolution these ideas were challenged. With a grasp of thought that could look at and examine questions of inherent right, on their original basis, with the abiding principles of the Christian faith to serve as a guide in judging of human duty in governments, and with the daily recurring practical examples of the conflicts of opinion between the Colonies and the mother country, she saw and acknowledged the wrongs inflicted on the Colonies. The movement for justice of that cause in which they had, at length, banded for a higher measure of liberty, and the growing capacity of the people to maintain those rights. She was thus made an intellectual convert to the doctrines of the Revolution, and became a counsellor to Allen in the subsequent critical periods of his life. Her mind was considered a counterpart, in its boldness and originality, to that of her husband, whose intuitive mode of reaching conclusions enabled him to put into the shape of acts. He also felt the happy influences of manners, opinions, and sentiments at once dignified and frank, yet mild and persuasive.

In 1789, Gen. Allen died suddenly, having been stricken with apoplexy while bringing a load of hay across the Lake from South Hero. Penniman was widowed again at the age of 29, this time with three small children, Fanny Allen (b. 1784; joined a convent of nuns in Montreal), Ethan Voltair Allen (born 1786), and Hannibal Allen (born 1787). Financially ill-prepared to look after herself, her three children, and two of Gen. Allen's daughters still living at home, Penniman left Burlington to live in Westminster with Margaret, where she remained until 1792.

=== Mrs. Penniman ===
On October 28, 1793, she married Hon. Jabez Penniman, of Colchester, Vermont. After the marriage, she returned to the northern part of the state. The judge was appointed Collector of Customs by Jefferson and held the office through Jefferson's two terms. They resided first at Swanton, but eventually settled on the river farm in Colchester.

To the Pennimans were born four children; Hortensia, who married Judge Brayton of Swanton; Udney, who inherited the homestead in Colchester; Julietta, who married Dr. Nathan Ryno Smith, a physician of Baltimore; and Adelia, who became the wife of Dr. Moody, one of the early physicians of Burlington. Two daughters of Adelia were well known in Burlington, Mrs. Mary M. Howe, and Mrs. Ella M. Goodrich, wife of Prof. E. Goodrich. Penniman's descendants had in their possession some interesting Allen relics, but two beautiful old Copley portraits of Penniman and her mother, Mrs. Crean Brush, passed into the possession of Mr. Pell, the owner of Ft. Ticonderoga. They were painted in New York in 1771, when Frances was eleven years of age. She is quaintly arrayed in a long bodice and long full skirt with her hair pompadoured and powdered like her mother's. But her face is strikingly bright and expressive. She holds in one slender hand a basket of flowers, a prophetic hint of that taste that brought her so much satisfaction when she became middle-aged. A Female Academy was started in Middlebury, Vermont, in 1802, and Mrs. Emma Willard began the Middlebury Female Seminary there in 1811. It was to her school, first in Middlebury and then in Troy (Emma Willard School), that Adelia Penniman was sent for her education.

During the War of 1812, the family removed back to Burlington. Penniman's herbarium was established in 1814 or 1815. The location was familiar to Burlington people, as the trolleys passed it on the way out to Fort Ethan Allen. The Penniman home formerly stood opposite St. Michael's College at the top of the hill just above the High Bridge. The home was spacious and hospitable.

Penniman was famous for her skill in gardening and her garden was stocked with a rare variety of plants and shrubs. And it was here that two herbaria were made by Mrs. Penniman and her youngest daughter Adelia, who was born in 1800. The region around the High Bridge was discovered by a Massachusetts botanist, who botanized the west side of the state in 1829, to be "a remarkable region, rich in rare and interesting plants." A part of this "remarkable region" was comprised in the Penniman farm, and here, in 1814, the mother/daughter botanists found and preserved their specimens. They doubtless followed the windings of the river in both directions and are known to have gone often through the woods then on the site of the Fort in their search for wild flowers. Not satisfied with the pressed flowers in the herbarium, they carried home the plants from their native haunts and cultivated and improved them in the home garden. Botany was said to be Mrs. Penniman's "favorite amusement." This was before any manual of botany had been published in this country. But botanical textbooks were not the only books published in the old country to be found in this home. A granddaughter of Penniman tells how each of Scott's novels was purchased as soon as it appeared, and how eagerly it was read and the question of authorship discussed by the whole circle of friends of the family. It may be that the specimens in these small herbaria were the oldest in the state, for the oldest in the herbaria of the University of Vermont are dated 1819. There were 80 or 90 specimens in each herbarium, although quite a number of cultivated plants are included. Many of the botanical names have long since been changed, and one at least, the ground or moss pink, had not been listed in the Vermont Flora, though reported as a recent "find" from Wallingford and also from Colchester.

The most interesting feature of this relic was that these two women were studying the natural sciences at such an early period. One can only appreciate it by considering the state of "female education" at that time. Northampton, Massachusetts, in 1782, had voted "Not to be at any expense for schooling girls," and as late as 1790, in Gloucester, the town decided that "Females are a tender and interesting branch of the community but have been much neglected in the public schools of this town." Massachusetts was settled more than 100 years earlier than Vermont, but Vermonters were progressive and firm believers in education. Burlington, in 1810, had four one-room schoolhouses where only the rudiments were taught.

But who instructed the mother, no one knows. She must have had an acquisitive mind, which grasped easily such opportunities for culture as came in her way. Historian Hall, quoting from one who knew her well, says "She was a fascinating woman, endowed with an ease of manner which she had acquired from intercourse with the polite society of the day, in which she had been brought up; possessed of a refined taste and many accomplishments."

== Death ==
Penniman was buried in the Elmwood Cemetery, Burlington, Vermont, with a horizontal stone over her grave. Not far from her resting-place are the graves of Hon. Samuel Hitchcock and wife, Lucy Allen, Penniman's step-daughter.
