= Van Lear Black =

American businessman (1875–1930)

Van-Lear Black
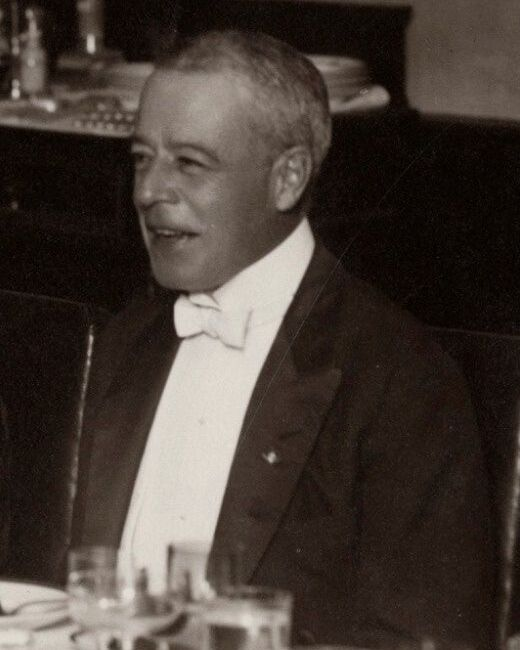
- Born: 18 December 1875
- Died: 18 August 1930 (aged 54); Atlantic shore
- Occupation: Chairman of the board of the A.S. Abell Company
- Known for: Early civilian world air travel
- Political party: Democrat
- Board member of: Consolidation Coal Company, A.S. Abell Company, Fidelity Trust and Deposit Company, Citizen's National Bank
- Spouse: Jessie Gary Black
- Children: 7

Van-Lear Black (18 December 1875 – 18 August 1930) was an American publisher and civil aviation pioneer.

== Early life ==
Black was born in Cumberland, Maryland, into a wealthy family who claimed they could trace their lineage back to the American Revolution. He married Jessie Gary (1876-1949) and had four children who survived to adulthood. Gary was the daughter of James A. Gary, Postmaster General under McKinley. In 1910 Black bought the estate "Folly Quarter" in Ellicott City, Maryland now known as the Shrine of St. Anthony. He restored it to its original condition and used it to entertain 500-700 political and publishing guests at a time, later selling it in 1924. Black was insured for $750,000 at the time of his death during the Great Depression. Black's wife died at the age of 73 in Baltimore. Black was considered to be the wealthiest person in Maryland at the time of his death.

== Businessman ==
Black got his start in banking at the age of eighteen as a clerk with the Fidelity Trust and Deposit Company, eventually becoming president in 1926. Black became involved with the Consolidation Coal Company as a director from 1906 to 1927. In 1920, he employed his connected friend Franklin D. Roosevelt while he also campaigned politically.

In 1915 Black became Chairman of the Board of A.S. Abell Company, publisher of The Baltimore Sun, until his death in 1930. Black worked side by side with his brother Harry bringing the newspaper to profitability. Harry C. Black took over after Van-Lear Black's death until 1956, and Van-Lear's son, Gary Black Sr. took over until 1984.

== Aviation explorer ==
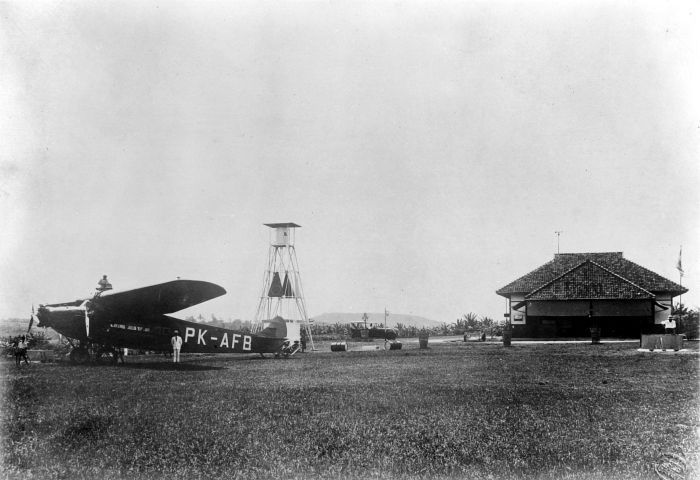
A Fokker F.VIIb/3m at Batavia

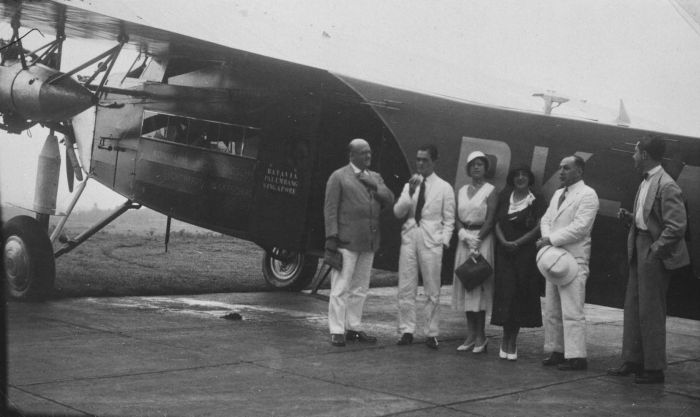
Fokker Passengers at Singapore

Black was not inclined to fly in the aircraft owned by his newspaper, but he changed his mind about aviation over time. He provided financing for Byrd's expedition flight to the North Pole in 1926. In each Byrd flight, he carried a Maryland flag provided by Black. When approached again for Byrd's Antarctic flight, Black considered the flight too risky, and instead offered to pay Byrd's widow $25,000 if he did not return. Byrd later sued Black's estate for the money for the completion of the trip after Black's death at sea.

On 15 June 1927, Black chartered a KLM monoplane for a 18,707-mile (30,106 km) flight from the Netherlands to Batavia and back in 27 days, the first international charter flight. Most flight occurred in a Fokker F.VII, (registered H-NADP) a high-wing monoplane powered by a single 440 hp Gnome-Rhone Jupiter IV engine and extended range tanks good for a range of 1,250 miles (2,010 km). The aircraft was brought into KLM's hangar on the 13th, and refitted with an overhauled engine and a four-seat configuration two days before the trip. The trip was described by newspapers as uneventful, yet while in Burma, wild elephants charged Black's aircraft. On 29 June 1927, Black became the first paying passenger to land in Singapore after 86 hours of flight time and 14 stops. The Queen of the Netherlands presented Black with the Cross of Knighthood of the Order of Orange-Nassau on return to the Netherlands. Black's return reception in Baltimore included 500 guests including his friends, Herbert C. Hoover, Commander Richard Evelyn Byrd, Anthony H. G. Fokker, Owen D. Young, Franklin D. Roosevelt.

A 1928 flight from London to South Africa was canceled en route at Khartoum due to aircraft trouble.

In 1929, Black traveled from London to the Cape of Good Hope and returned in his new Wright Whirlwind powered Fokker "Maryland Free State". The aircraft was intended to be painted with Maryland Flags and be registered to England for part of the trip, and registered in America when in the states. A month later, he attempted an extended route from London to Tokyo. His Fokker aircraft crashed at DumDum airport, and then was destroyed at Calcutta, India by a cyclone, though the crew escaped injury. Black traveled back to England by train, and ordered a new "Maryland Free State".

As a passenger, rather than a pilot, Black flew with ease despite crashing in Genoa and India. An American Trimotor pilot noted that when he asked why his aircraft was not flying level on a flight to Cleveland, he was pointed to a failed motor on the wing. He quietly sat down without fuss all the way to the landing.

In February 1930, Black commissioned a Fokker VIIb trimotor aircraft G-AADZ "The Maryland Free State" to fly from London to Tokyo to Java. He created his own company for the flight, VLB ltd. The flight included stops in Venice, Italy, and Athens, Greece, landing in Tokyo, Japan on 7 April 1930. The aircraft was disassembled for the Pacific voyage to San Francisco, then reassembled for the final flight to Baltimore on 18 May, a 16,000-mile (26,000 km) trip.

Van-Lear Black was considered to have flown more miles as a passenger than anyone else of the time and had future air tours planned.

== Disappearance ==
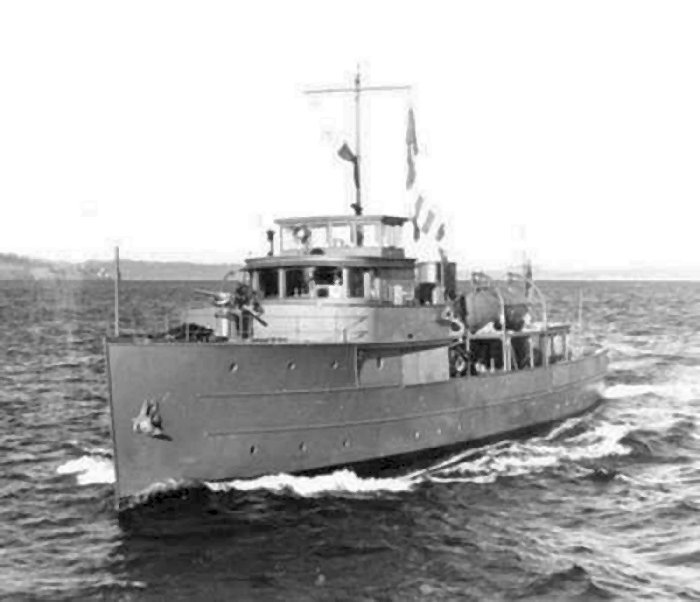
HMCS Cougar (formally the Sabalo) in the 1940s

Black purchased the USS Sabalo for use as a pleasure yacht in 1921. On August 18, 1930, while en route from the New York Yacht Club to Baltimore, Black fell to his death off the back of the Sabalo off the coast of New Jersey. He had a dangerous habit of sitting on the rail while smoking. His loss prompted an all-out air-sea search by four amphibious airplanes, the Coast Guard and the Zeppelin USS Los Angeles (ZR-3) called upon by Black's personal friend, New York Governor Franklin D. Roosevelt. Only his cap was found, washed onshore at a New Jersey beach. Black's newspaper staff worked diligently to disguise his guest, Mrs. J. Walter Lord, as an elderly cousin to avoid scandal.

== Namesakes ==
- Mount Black in Antarctica was named for Black by Richard Evelyn Byrd for financing his 1928 Antarctic expedition.
- The town of Van Lear, Kentucky is named after Black during his involvement with Consolidation Coal Company.
- The Crater class cargo ship SS Van Lear Black was named after Black.
- The Van Lear Black rock band, formed in 2011, and based in Paintsville, Kentucky.
