= Smith–Theobald Family =

The Smith–Theobald Family was a prominent family in the history of American medicine.

Nathan Smith (1762–1829) was the first member of the family to be a surgeon. He founded or taught at the medical schools of Dartmouth College, the University of Vermont and Yale University.

Nathan had four sons, all of whom were physicians. His son Nathan Ryno Smith, was a professor at many medical schools, with the later part of his career spent at the University of Maryland.

A grandson through a different son, Nathan Lincoln Smith (1822–1898) was a professor of medicine at George Washington University.

Berwick B. Smith (1826–1860) and Alan Penniman Smith (1840–1898), sons of Nathan Ryno Smith, were both professors at the University of Maryland medical school. Alan Smith was involved in convincing Johns Hopkins to found Johns Hopkins Hospital.

Alan's sons, Nathan Ryno Smith, Jr. (born 1863) and Walter Prescott Smith (1868–1902) were both physicians as well. Elisha Warfield Theobald (1818–1851), husband of Nathan Ryno Smith's Sr.'s daughter, Sarah Frances Smith Theobald, was a physician as well. Her younger son, Elisha Warfield Theobald Jr., (1850–1877) was a physician but did not live long enough to make a great impact on the profession. However Samuel Theobald, Sarah's older son, became head of the American Ophthalmological Society and was from 1893 to 1925 an active professor at Johns Hopkins University (he was emeritus for the next five years until his death). Sarah also had a daughter whose son Warfield Theobald Longcope was also a professor at Johns Hopkins University.

== Sources ==
- American Ophthalmological Society article on Samuel Theobald
