= Nathan Ryno Smith =

American surgeon (1797–1877)

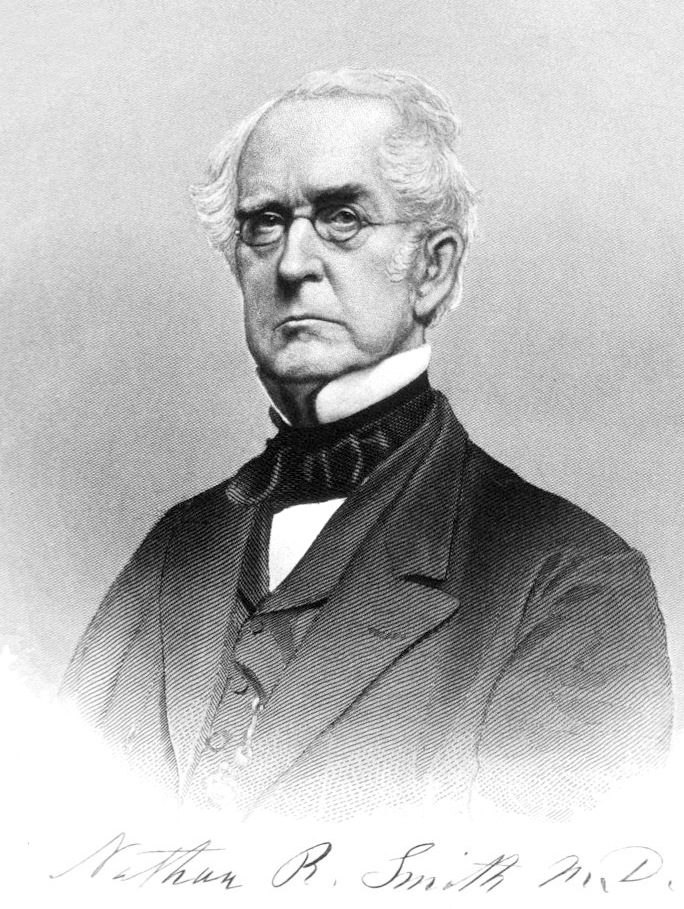
Nathan Ryno Smith

Nathan Ryno Smith (May 21, 1797 – July 3, 1877) was an American surgeon and medical school professor.

Smith was born in Cornish, New Hampshire. He was the son of Sarah Hall Chase and Nathan Smith. Like his father Smith went into the medical profession, but he went to Yale instead of Harvard, receiving his MD in 1820. Smith had received his bachelor's degree in 1817, and had worked as a tutor for a family in Fauquier County, Virginia for a time before taking up medical studies.

Smith set up a medical practice at Burlington, Vermont in 1824 and the following year was appointed a professor of surgery at the University of Vermont. After this Smith moved to Philadelphia where he was involved in the founding of Jefferson Medical College. Smith later joined the faculty of the University of Maryland where he served as the clinical surgeon at the Baltimore Infirmary. Smith initially joined the University of Maryland faculty in 1827, but he left the following year to be a professor of medicine at Transylvania University. He did not return to the University of Maryland School of Medicine until 1840, but remained on the faculty there for the next 30 years.

Smith and his wife Juliette, daughter of the botanist, Frances Penniman, had two sons of note. One, Alan Penniman Smith (born 1840) was an incorporator of Johns Hopkins University. Another, Berwick B. Smith became a demonstrator in anatomy at the University of Maryland in 1852 but died in 1859. Smith's grandson, Samuel Theobald was a professor of ophthalmology at Johns Hopkins University. He died in 1877

== See also ==
- Smith-Theobald Family

== Sources ==
- history of medical education at the University of Maryland
- history of surgery at the University of Vermont
