= Nathan Smith (physician, born 1762) =

American physician

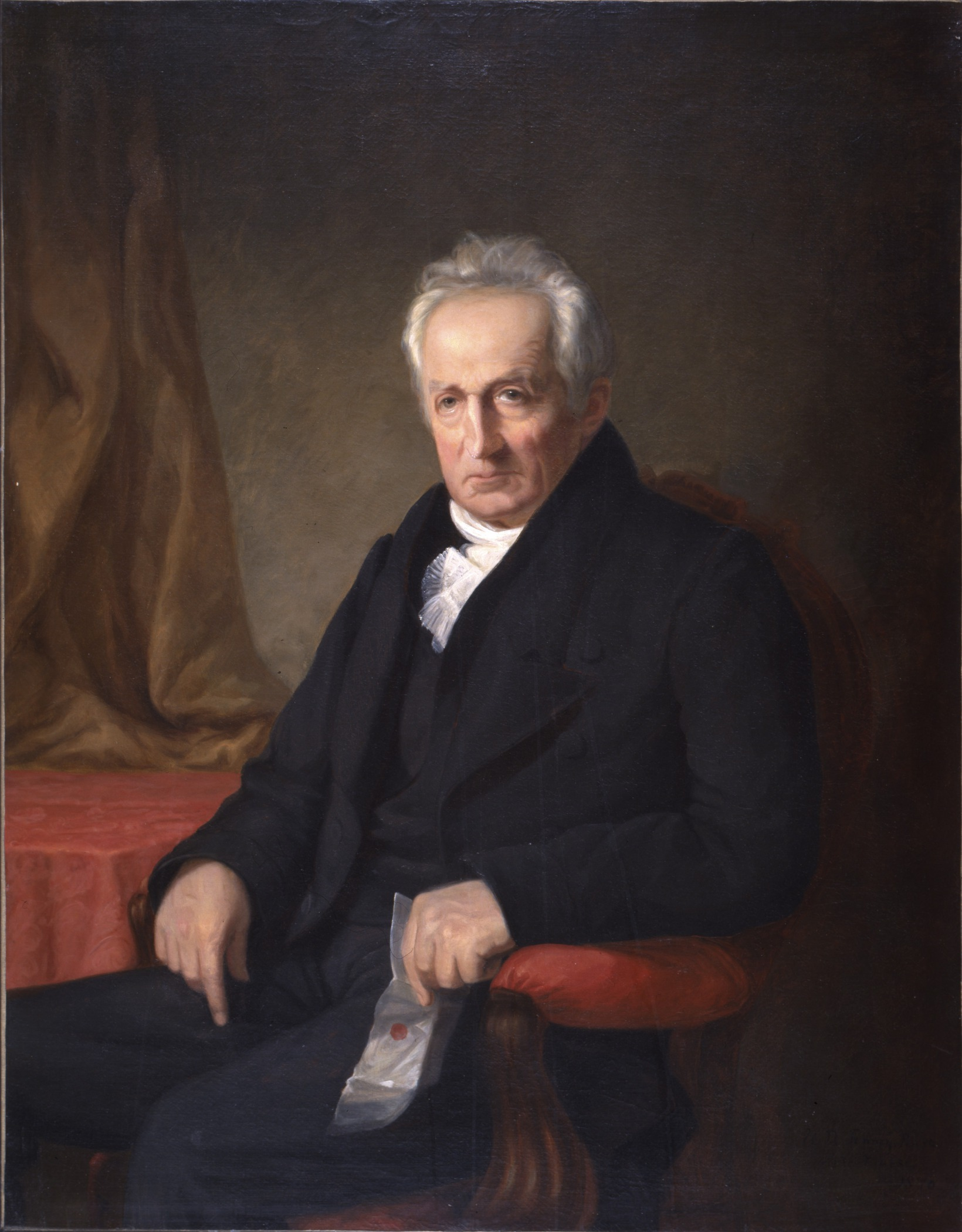
- Born: August 30, 1762; Rehoboth, Massachusetts
- Died: January 26, 1829 (aged 66); New Haven, Connecticut
- Education: Harvard Medical School; University of Edinburgh Medical School
- Occupations: Physician and educator
- Children: Nathan Ryno Smith

Nathan Smith (September 30, 1762 – January 26, 1829) was a well known medical doctor and professor in colonial and post-Revolutionary New England. He was noted as a skilled surgeon, teacher, writer, and practitioner. A leader in pioneering medical education in the United States, Smith founded or co-founded Dartmouth Medical School, the University of Vermont College of Medicine, the Medical School of Maine, and the Yale School of Medicine.

== Biography ==
Smith was born in Rehoboth, Massachusetts on September 30, 1762. When he was young, the family moved to a farm in Chester, Vermont, where Smith attended public school. Smith served in the Vermont militia, which fought indigenous people on the colony's frontier.

Smith decided to study medicine at age 24, after seeing an operation performed by Dr. Josiah Goodhue. Smith spent three years with Goodhue at Putney, Vermont, then opened his own practice at Cornish, New Hampshire. He later went to the Harvard College's medical department where he obtained his M.B. in 1790. Smith was the third graduate of Harvard's medical department. He was later awarded an MD by Harvard in 1811. In 1803 Smith matriculated at the University of Edinburgh where he attended medical classes for a year.

To address the new nation's need for expanded medical education, Smith founded the medical department at Dartmouth College. Initially the only member of the Dartmouth Medical School faculty, Smith taught anatomy, chemistry, surgery, and clinical medicine. He essentially served as dean and treasurer of the medical school, also. Smith emphasized experience rather than theory, and he largely eschewed bleeding and purging, favoring support of the body's own healing powers and attentiveness to the patient's comfort. Using these principles, he was a consultant on the child Joseph Smith, the future founder of the Latter Day Saint movement, saving his leg from amputation.

At Yale, Smith was the first professor of physic, surgery and obstetrics.

== Death and legacy ==
Smith died January 26, 1829 at New Haven, Connecticut. Three of his sons became physicians, the most prominent being Nathan Ryno Smith.

A collection of notes taken on his medical lectures between 1814 and 1815 are held at the National Library of Medicine. The Nathan Smith Society at Dartmouth College serves students interested in the health professions.

== See also ==
- Smith-Theobald Family
