= Shrine of St. Anthony (Maryland) =

Franciscan shrine in Ellicott City, Maryland

St. Joseph Cupertino Friary

Religion
- Affiliation: Catholic Church
- Diocese: Archdiocese of Baltimore
- Ecclesiastical or organisational status: Shrine

Location
- Location: 12290 Folly Quarter Rd; Ellicott City, Maryland, United States
- Interactive map of St. Joseph Cupertino Friary

Architecture
- Architects: Benedict Przemielewski, OFM Conv.
- Type: Friary/Novitate
- Style: Neo-Renaissance
- Groundbreaking: 1930
- Completed: 1931
- Materials
- Carrollton Hall
- U.S. National Register of Historic Places
- Location within Maryland Location within the United States
- Location: 12290 Folly Quarter Rd., Ellicott City, Maryland
- Coordinates: 39°15′26″N 76°56′17″W
- Built: 1930-1931
- NRHP reference No.: 14001042

Website
- www.shrineofstanthony.org

The Shrine of St. Anthony is a Catholic shrine honoring St. Anthony of Padua. The shrine is located within the St. Joseph Cupertino Friary in Ellicott City, Maryland, USA. The shrine is a ministry of the Conventual Franciscan Friars, Our Lady of the Angels Province, USA.

The friary covers 20,194 ft^{2} (1,876.1 m^{2}) on 320 acres (1.3 km^{2}; 0.50 sq mi) of hills and woodland.

The chapel which houses the relic of St. Anthony is open to the public during published visiting hours. Mass is offered at noon daily throughout the year. The shrine also offers the Sacrament of Reconciliation, spiritual direction, and days of prayer.

For prayer and solitude the grounds around the friary offers seven trails and a Lourdes grotto. In 2010 an outdoor shrine to St. Maximilian Kolbe was added to the garden. It features a statue of Maximilian Kolbe that was blessed by Pope John Paul II on the day Maximilian Kolbe was canonized.

The historic Manor House is open to the public during posted hours on the Sundays in October until the first Sunday of November. It features two heritage rooms and a traveling art exhibit. In 2008 it displayed watercolor paintings by Fr. Gerry Waterman, OFM Conv. and poetry by Fr. Gary Johnson, OFM Conv. The building was listed on the National Register of Historic Places in 2014.

== History ==
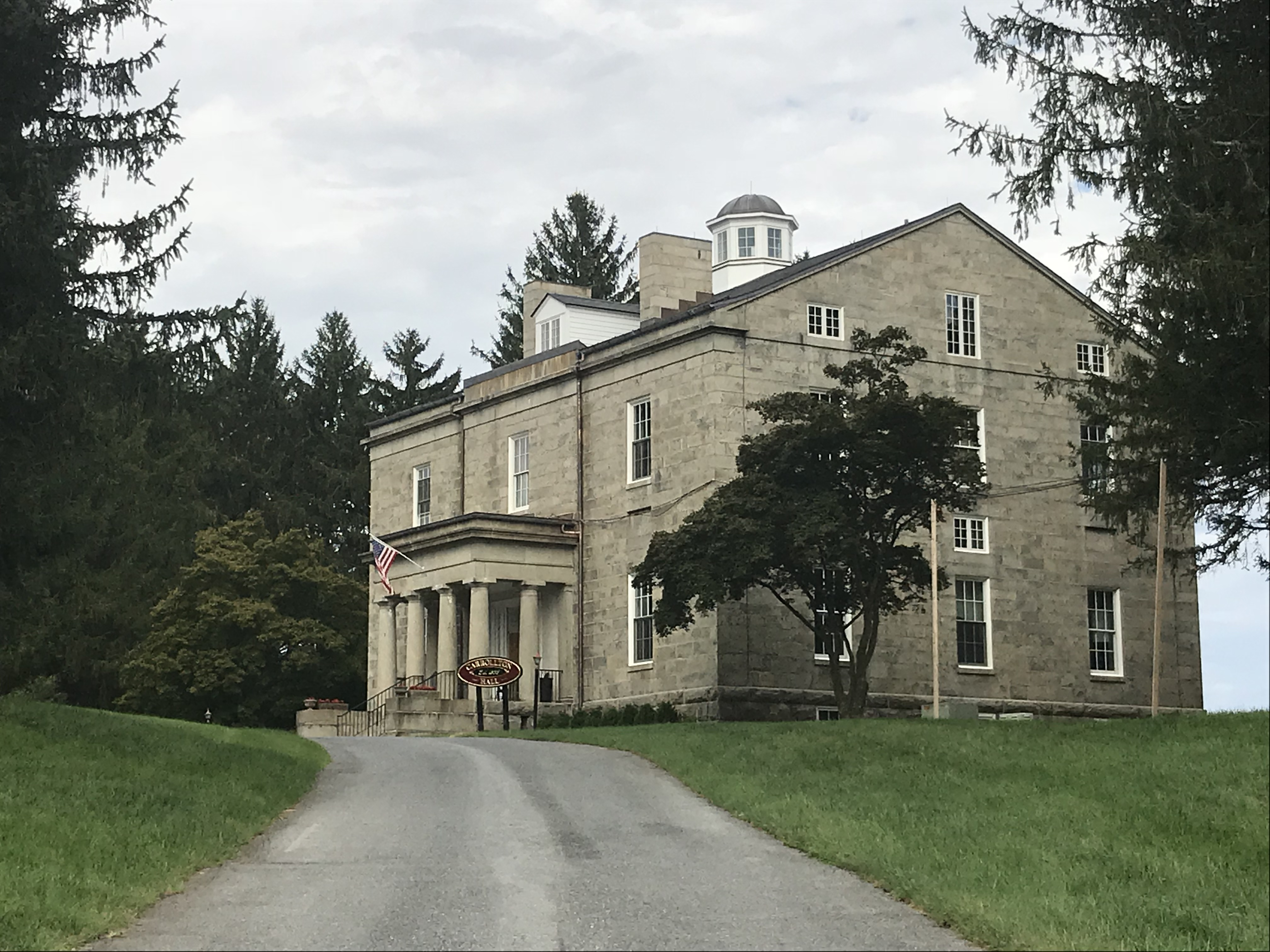
Carrollton Hall

The history of the property on which the Shrine of St. Anthony sits can be tied back to the Carroll family. In 1700 Charles Carroll of Annapolis was granted 10,000 acres (40 km^{2}; 16 sq mi) of property in what is now Howard County, MD. In 1717 he began construction of Doughoregan Manor. Charles Carroll of Carrollton inherited the property and was eventually buried there. An area of 1,000 acres (4 km^{2}) of land was sectioned off from the Doughoregan estate and given to Emily Caton MacTavish (Carroll's granddaughter) as a wedding present. The estate was immediately named "Folly Quarter". The manor house was designed by William Small, a protege of Benjamin Latrobe. It was originally built around 1730 as part of the Doughoregan Manor estate, it was then remodeled by Charles Carroll of Carrollton for Emily Caton MacTavish, and completed in 1832.

The property was offered for sale in the 1840s, without success, and then sold to Emily's son, Charles Carroll MacTavish in 1850, with around forty slaves. He sold the estate to Charles M. Dougherty in 1864 for $100,000. Through inheritance and marriage the property ended up back in the hands of the Carroll family via John Lee Carroll, governor of Maryland from 1876 to 1880. In 1910 the property was bought by Mr. Van Lear Black, a publisher of The Baltimore Sun. In 1924 Mr. Black sold the house to Mr. Morris Schapiro, the president of the Boston Iron and Metal Company, who in turn sold the house and 236 acres (0.96 km^{2}) of the original estate to the Franciscan Friars in 1928 for $436,000.

The Cardinal Protector of the Order, Rafael Merry del Val, Secretary of State under Pope Pius X, sent his blessing on the new establishment which was to be used by the Friars as a novitiate.

The manor house became too small for the community and one of the Friars, Fr. Benedict Przemielewski was commissioned to design a new novitate. He decided to create a miniature version of the Sacro Convento, the original Friary built in Assisi, Italy in the 13th century. Construction started in 1930 and was completed in 1931. Archbishop Michael Joseph Curley blessed the new novitate in 1931.

In 1995, the Basilica of Saint Anthony of Padua, Italy made a gift of a first class relic of St. Anthony and Reliquary to the shrine as well as copies of thirteen original paintings detailing particularly important moments in the life of St. Anthony. The Shrine of Saint Anthony offers retreat spaces for outside guests and hosts an annual pilgrimage in mid-June in honor of the Feast Day of St. Anthony of Padua.

On July 1, 2005, William Cardinal Keeler, the Archbishop of Baltimore declared the Shrine of St. Anthony the official Archdiocesan shrine to St. Anthony.

== Folly Farm ==
The Folly Farm house was constructed in 1730. In 1800 Charles Carroll modified the Greek, Georgian, and Romanesque building with four large front columns, a round chapel, a marble bathing pool in the cellar, and a three fireplace kitchen. Three dungeon cubes were installed with trapdoors. The house was given to granddaughter Emily Caton MacTavish to live in while Folly Quarter was under construction. The property has been subdivided to a seven-acre parcel with the house.

== See also ==
- List of Howard County properties in the Maryland Historical Trust
- National Register of Historic Places listings in Howard County, Maryland
- Joseph of Cupertino
