= Marianne Wellesley, Marchioness Wellesley =

American-born British noble (1788–1853)

The Most Honourable The Marchioness Wellesley
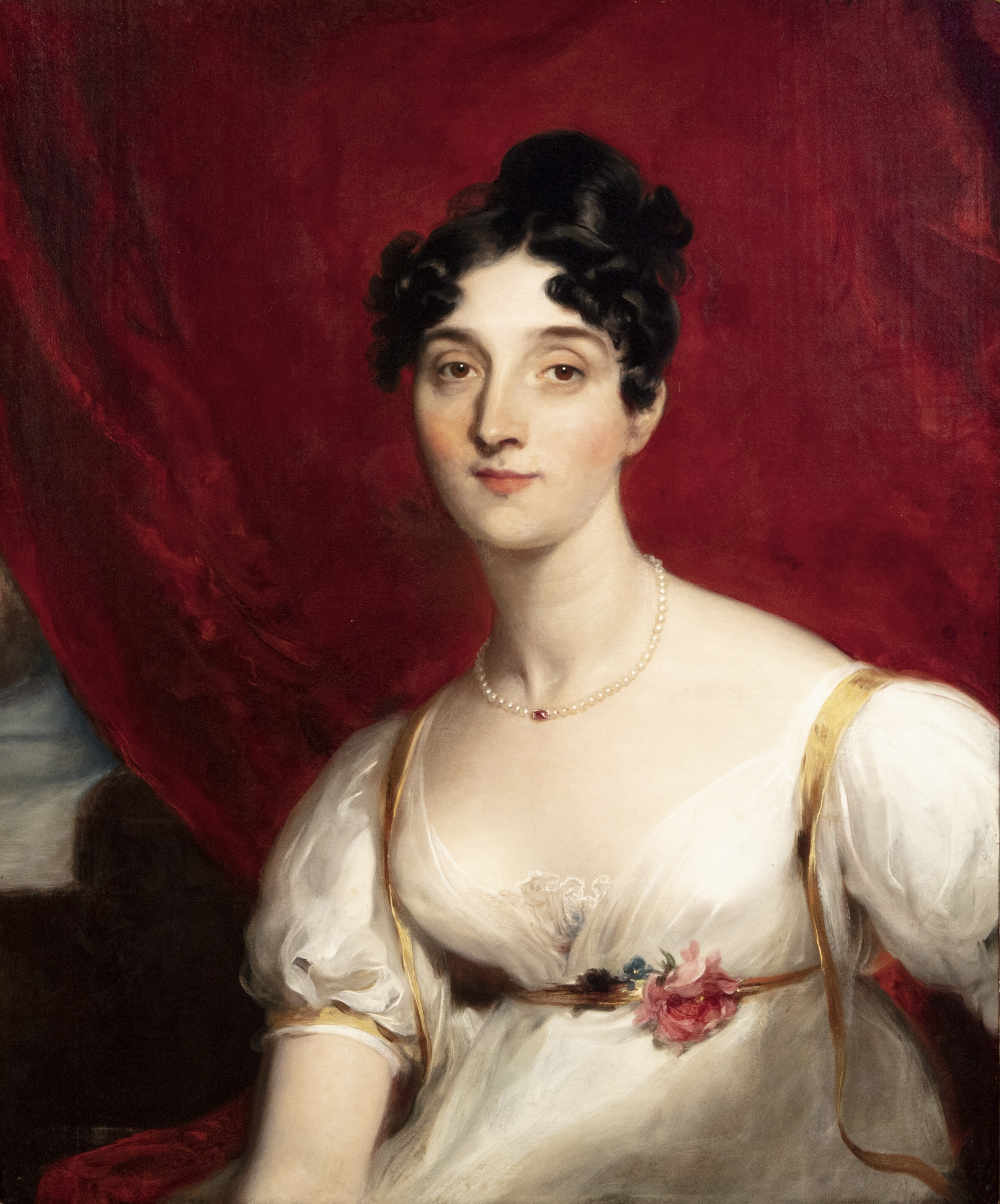
- Portrait by Thomas Lawrence, c. 1817–1825

Personal details
- Born: Marianne Caton; 1788 Baltimore, Maryland, United States
- Died: 17 December 1853 (aged 64–65) Hampton Court Palace, Greater London, England
- Spouse(s): Robert Patterson (died 1822) Richard Wellesley, 1st Marquess Wellesley (m. 1825; died 1842)
- Relations: Charles Carroll of Carrollton (grandfather)
- Parent(s): Richard Caton; Mary Carroll Caton

Marianne Wellesley, Marchioness Wellesley (née Caton, formerly Patterson; 1788 – 17 December 1853) was the American second wife of Richard Wellesley, 1st Marquess Wellesley, a brother of the Duke of Wellington.

== Early life ==
She originated from Baltimore, Maryland, where her father, Richard Caton, was a merchant. The family was Roman Catholic, and Marianne's mother, Mary, was the daughter of Charles Carroll of Carrollton (died 1832), the last surviving signatory of the United States Declaration of Independence.

== Personal life ==
Marianne first married Robert Patterson, whose sister Elizabeth (died 1879) was the first wife of Jérôme Bonaparte, Napoleon's brother. The Pattersons (originally spelled Paterson) were wealthy neighbours of the Catons in Baltimore. The couple came to Europe for the benefit of Marianne's health, bringing with them two of Marianne's sisters. One sister, Louisa, married a baronet, Sir Felton Hervey-Bathurst, in 1813, and after his death married Francis D'Arcy-Osborne, Marquess of Carmarthen, later 7th Duke of Leeds. Another Caton sister, Elizabeth, married George Stafford-Jerningham, 8th Baron Stafford, as his second wife.

=== Second marriage ===
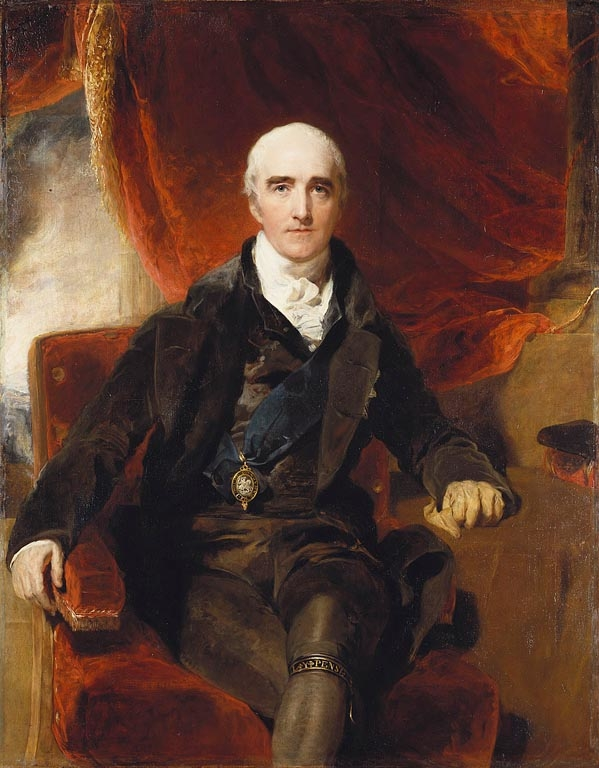
Portrait of the Marquess Wellesley by Thomas Lawrence, 1813.

On 29 October 1825 in Dublin, following the death of her husband in 1822, she married Richard Wellesley, 1st Marquess Wellesley, then the Lord Lieutenant of Ireland (since 1821), whose first wife died in 1816, so she became the Vicereine until 1828. Prior to their marriage, they may already have been lovers. The marquess was short of money and Marianne's inheritance may have been part of the reason for his proposal. Her family disapproved of the marriage because of Wellesley's reputation and his several children by his first wife, Hyacinthe-Gabrielle Roland.

The marchioness's portrait was painted by Christina Robertson; an engraving by Thomas Anthony Dean is held by the National Portrait Gallery, London. She was also the subject of an unfinished portrait by Thomas Lawrence.

In 1830, the marchioness was appointed a Lady of the Bedchamber to Adelaide of Saxe-Meiningen, the queen of William IV of the United Kingdom, and held the position until King William's death in 1837.

She died on 17 December 1853, aged 65, at Hampton Court Palace, and was buried at Costessey, Norfolk, home of her sister, Lady Stafford.
