= Felton Hervey-Bathurst =

Sir Felton Hervey-Bathurst, Bt KH

Personal details
- Born: Felton Elwell Hervey; 1782
- Died: 24 September 1819 (aged 36–37)
- Spouse: Louisa Catherine Caton (m. 1813)
- Relations: Felton Hervey (grandfather); Sir John Elwill, 4th Baronet (grandfather); John Hervey, 1st Earl of Bristol (great-grandfather)
- Parent(s): Felton Lionel Hervey; Selina Elwill

Military service
- Branch/service: British Army
- Rank: Colonel
- Unit: 14th Light Dragoons
- Battles/wars: Napoleonic Wars; Battle of Fuentes de Oñoro; Battle of El Bodon

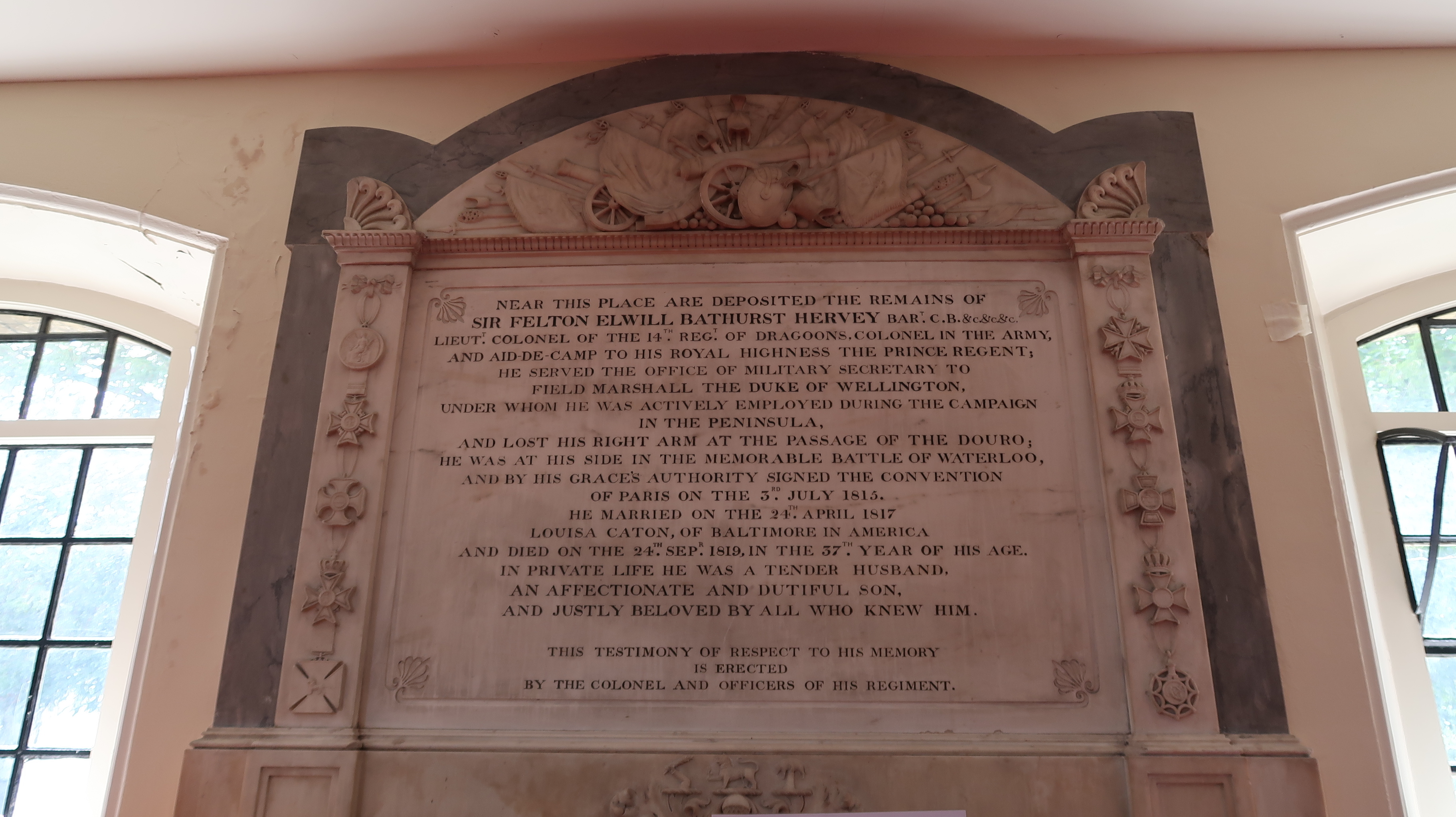
Sir Felton Elwill Bathurst Hervey - Wall memorial

Colonel Sir Felton Elwell Hervey-Bathurst, 1st Baronet, KH (1782 – 24 September 1819), was an officer in the British Army during the Napoleonic Wars.

== Early life ==
Born Felton Elwell Hervey in 1782, he was a son of Lieutenant Felton Lionel Hervey and his wife Selina Elwill. His father worked for the exchequer before committing suicide in a London gunsmiths in 1785.

His paternal grandfather was Felton Hervey (the seventh son of John Hervey, 1st Earl of Bristol). His mother was the only daughter and heir of Sir John Elwill, 4th Baronet, and his wife Selina Bathurst.

In 1801, the younger Felton assumed, by Royal licence, the additional surname of Bathurst after his maternal grandmother.

== Career ==
On 6 May 1806, Hervey-Bathurst was appointed a major in 14th Light Dragoons. In December 1808 went with his regiment to join the British Army in Iberia engaged in the Peninsula War. He lost his right arm at the Battle of Douro (28 March 1809), but by 2 August 1810 was well enough to be promoted to Lieutenant-Colonel and to command of the 14th Light Dragoons from 1811 to 1814. During this time he fought in a number of engagements being wound again at the battles Fuentes de Oñoro and the El Bodon.

He was brevetted Colonel On 4 July 1814 and appointed Aide-de-camp (A.D.C.) to the Prince Regent. During the Waterloo Campaign he served on the Duke of Wellington's staff, and was Wellington's representative at the negotiations for the surrender of Paris, signing the Convention of St. Cloud on 3 July 1815.

=== Hervey-Bathurst baronetcy ===
His baronetcy was created on 7 December 1818, with remainder, failing heirs male of his own, to the heirs male of his father.

== Personal life ==
On 24 April 1817 at Apsley House, home of the Duke of Wellington, Felton Hervey was married to Louisa Catherine Caton (1793–1874), the third daughter of Richard Caton, a merchant of Baltimore, Maryland who was born in Lancashire. Among her siblings was sister Marianne (wife of Richard Wellesley, 1st Marquess Wellesley) and Elizabeth (wife of George Stafford-Jerningham, 8th Baron Stafford). The marriage certificate was witnessed by Wellington, Bathurst, Lord Liverpool, The Duke of Westminster, John Quincy Adams, the Earl of Leicester and the Duke of Montellano, and is stored at the National Archives Kew.

After his death on 24 September 1819, he was succeeded according to the special remainder by his next brother, Frederick Anne Hervey-Bathurst (1783–1824), the 2nd Hervey-Bathurst baronet. In 1828, his widow remarried to Francis D'Arcy-Osborne, later the 7th Duke of Leeds.

== Honors and medals ==
Medals received for battle were:

- Gold Medal for Fuentes d'Onor and Salamanca
- Waterloo Medal
- Knight of the Royal Guelphic Order
- Companion of the Order of the Bath
- Russian Order of St George
- Russian Order of St Vladimir
- Austrian Order of Maria Theresa
- Portuguese Order of The Tower and Sword
- Bavarian order of Joseph Maximilian
- Bavarian order of Joseph Maximilian
- Knight of St Henry of Saxony

== Notes ==
Baronetage of the United Kingdom
New creation	Baronet of Lainston; 1818–1819	Succeeded by Frederick Hervey-Bathurst
