= Duke of Buckingham =

Title in the peerages of England, Britain, and the UK

Duke of Buckingham, referring to the market town of Buckingham, England, is an extinct title that has been created several times in the peerages of England, Great Britain, and the United Kingdom. There were creations of double dukedoms of Buckingham and Normanby and of Buckingham and Chandos. The 1st Duke of Buckingham and Normanby built Buckingham House in the early 1700s, which eventually came into the hands of the monarch and is now Buckingham Palace. The tenth and last holder of any variation of the dukedom, the 3rd Duke of Buckingham and Chandos, died in 1889.

There have also been Earls of Buckingham and Marquesses of Buckingham.

== History ==
=== Dukes of Buckingham, first creation (1444) ===
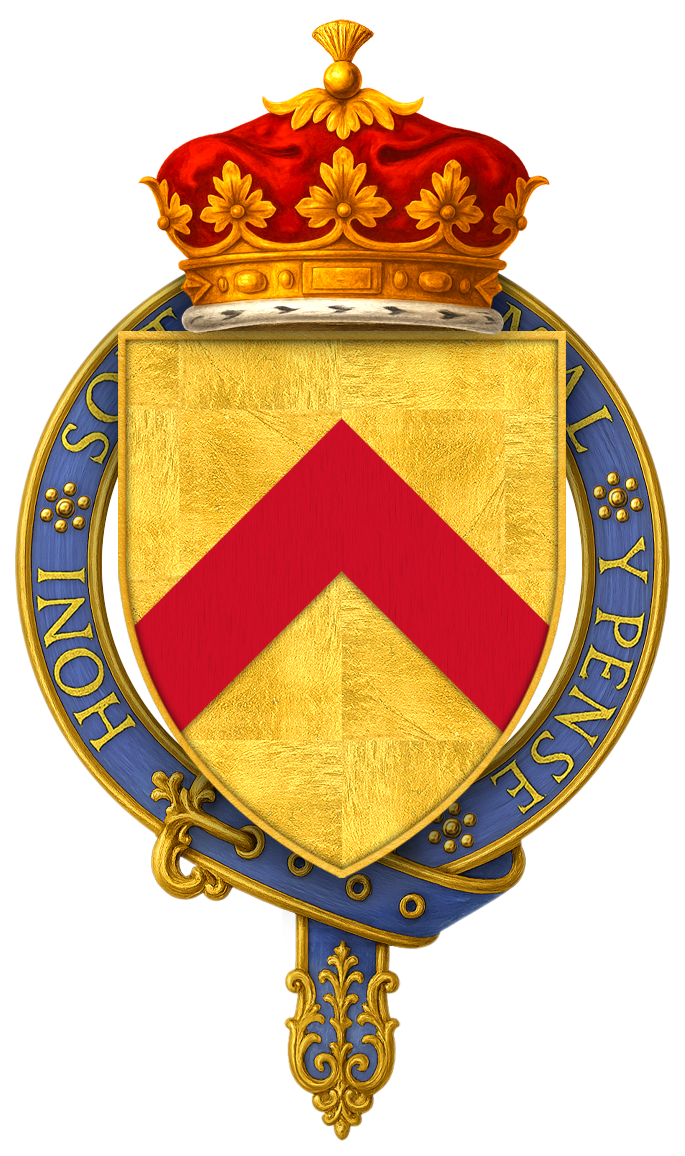
Arms of Humphrey Stafford, 1st Duke of Buckingham (1402–1460)

The first creation of the dukedom was on 14 September 1444, when Humphrey Stafford was made Duke of Buckingham.

On his father's side, Stafford was descended from Edmund de Stafford, who had been summoned to Parliament as Lord Stafford in 1299. The second Baron had been created Earl of Stafford in 1351. On his mother's side, Stafford was the son of Anne of Gloucester, daughter of Thomas of Woodstock, Earl of Buckingham (later Duke of Gloucester), youngest son of King Edward III of England. Stafford was an important supporter of the House of Lancaster in the Wars of the Roses, and was killed at the Battle of Northampton in July 1460.

The 1st Duke of Buckingham was succeeded by his grandson, Henry Stafford, 2nd Duke of Buckingham, who aided Richard III in his claiming the throne in 1483, but who then led a revolt against Richard and was executed later that same year. His titles were forfeited along with the dukedom.

His son, Edward Stafford, 3rd Duke of Buckingham, was restored to the title upon Henry VII's accession to the throne in 1485, but he was ultimately executed for treason in 1521 due to his opposition to Cardinal Thomas Wolsey, Henry VIII's chief advisor. At this time the title became extinct; it was posthumously attainted in 1523.

=== Dukes of Buckingham, second creation (1623) ===
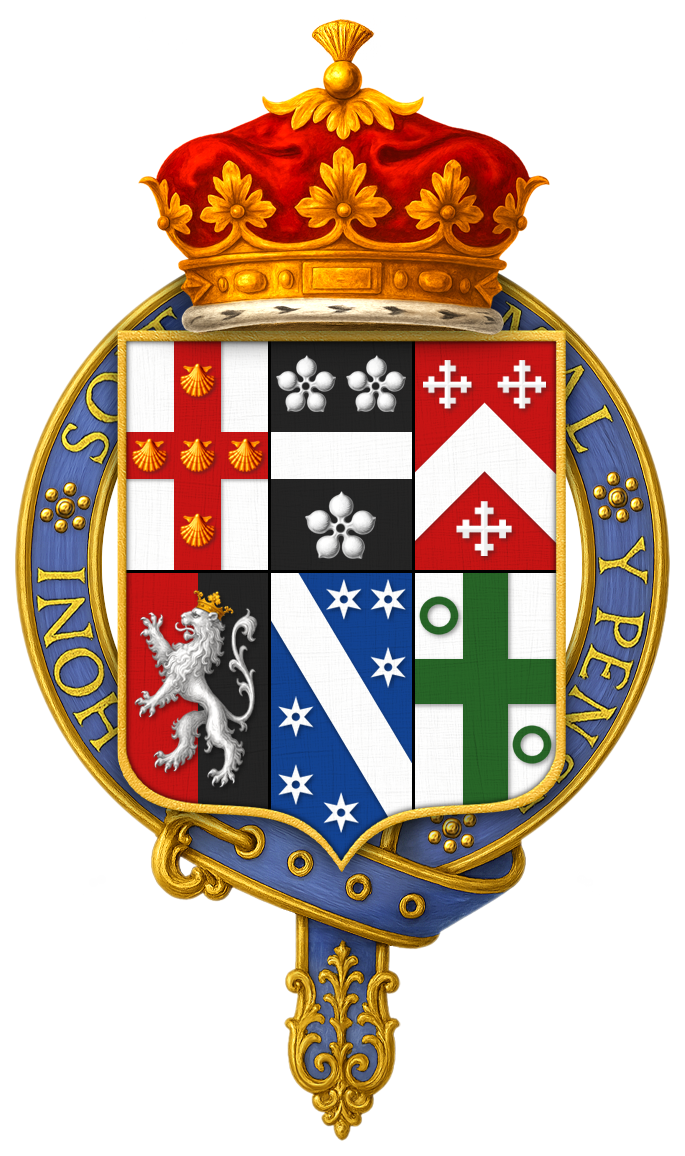
Arms of George Villiers, 1st Duke of Buckingham (1592–1628)

The second creation of the dukedom was in 1623 for George Villiers, a favourite of James I of England. He had previously been made Baron Whaddon, of Whaddon in the County of Buckingham, and Viscount Villiers in 1616, then Earl of Buckingham in 1617, then Marquess of Buckingham in 1618 until he was also created Earl of Coventry and Duke of Buckingham in 1623. Buckingham, who continued in office as chief minister into the reign of James's son, Charles I, was responsible for a policy of war against Spain and France. In 1628, he was assassinated by John Felton, a disgruntled army officer who had served under him, as he prepared an expedition to relieve the Huguenots of La Rochelle.

His son, George Villiers, 2nd Duke of Buckingham, was a notable advisor in the reign of Charles II, and along with Lord Ashley made up the Protestant axis of the famous Cabal Ministry. He started the first foxhunt in England, the Bilsdale Hunt, in 1668, and then started the Sinnington Hunt in 1680. After digging for a fox above Kirkbymoorside, near York, and being too far from his home in Helmsley, North Yorkshire, he died from a chill in the house of a tenant. With his death in 1687, and having no issue, the title again became extinct.

Several other members of the Villiers family have been elevated to the peerage. Christopher Villiers, 1st Earl of Anglesey, and John Villiers, Viscount Purbeck, were brothers of the first Duke of Buckingham. Also, Edward Villiers, 1st Earl of Jersey, was the great-nephew of the first Duke of Buckingham while Thomas Villiers, 1st Earl of Clarendon, was the second son of the second Earl of Jersey.

=== Dukes of Buckingham, third creation (1703) ===
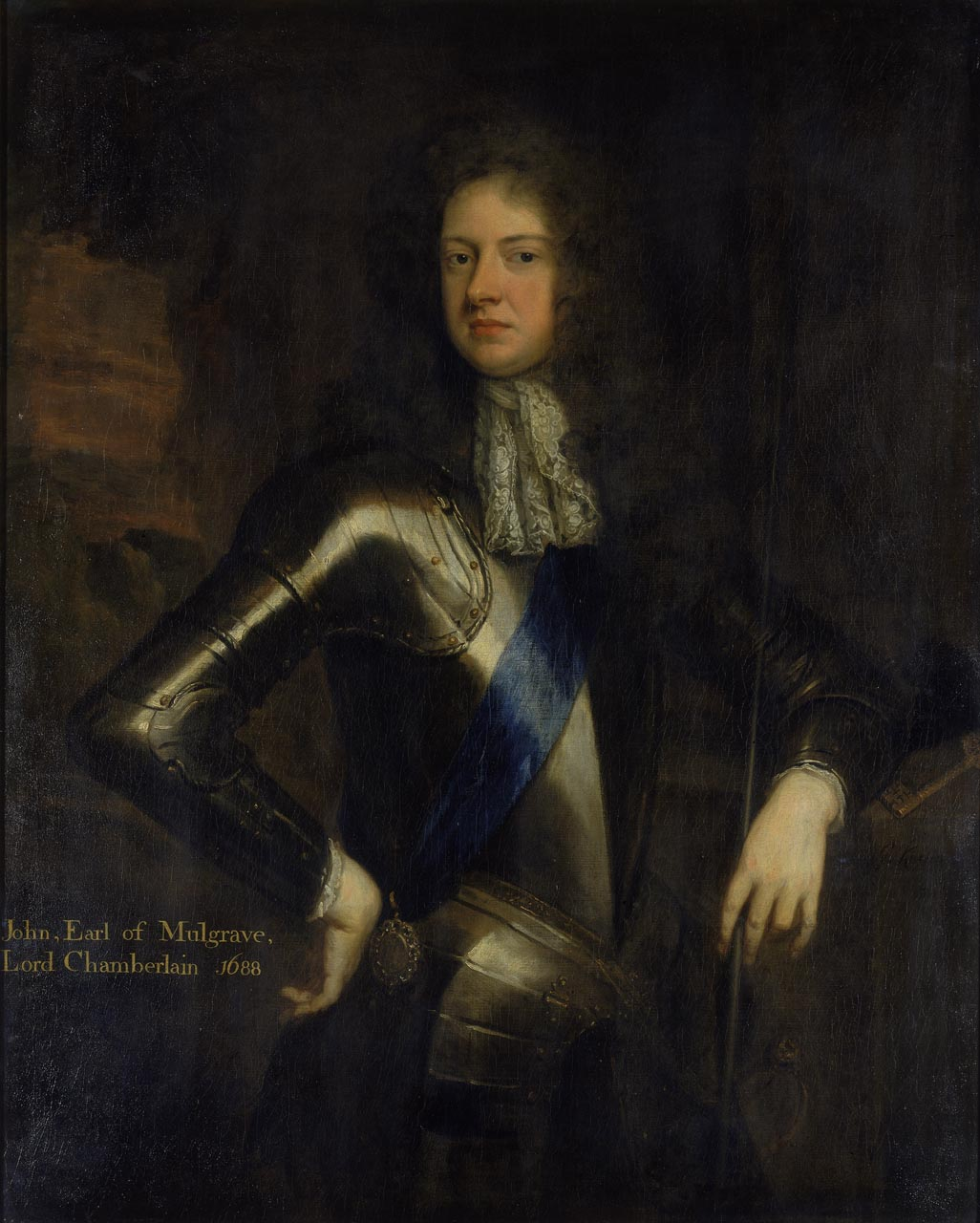
John Sheffield, 1st Duke of Buckingham and Normanby (1648–1721)

The third creation of the dukedom, as Duke of Buckingham and Normanby, was in 1703 for John Sheffield, 3rd Earl of Mulgrave, 1st Marquess of Normanby, a notable Tory politician of the late Stuart period, who served under Queen Anne as Lord Privy Seal and Lord President of the Council. The dukedom was created in the Peerage of England. The full title was Duke of the County of Buckingham and of Normanby but in practice only Duke of Buckingham and Normanby was used. The duke's family descended from Sir Edmund Sheffield, second cousin of Henry VIII, who in 1547 was raised to the Peerage of England as Baron Sheffield and in 1549 was killed in the streets of Norwich during Kett's Rebellion.

On the death of the 2nd Duke of Buckingham and Normanby in 1735, the titles became extinct. The Sheffield family estates passed to the 2nd Duke's half-brother Charles Herbert Sheffield, the illegitimate son of the 1st Duke by Frances Stewart. He was created a Baronet in 1755 and is the ancestor of the Sheffield Baronets, of Normanby.

The seat of the family was Buckingham House, which John Sheffield built, until it was sold to King George III in 1761 by Charles Sheffield, John's son.

=== Dukes of Buckingham, fourth creation (1822) ===
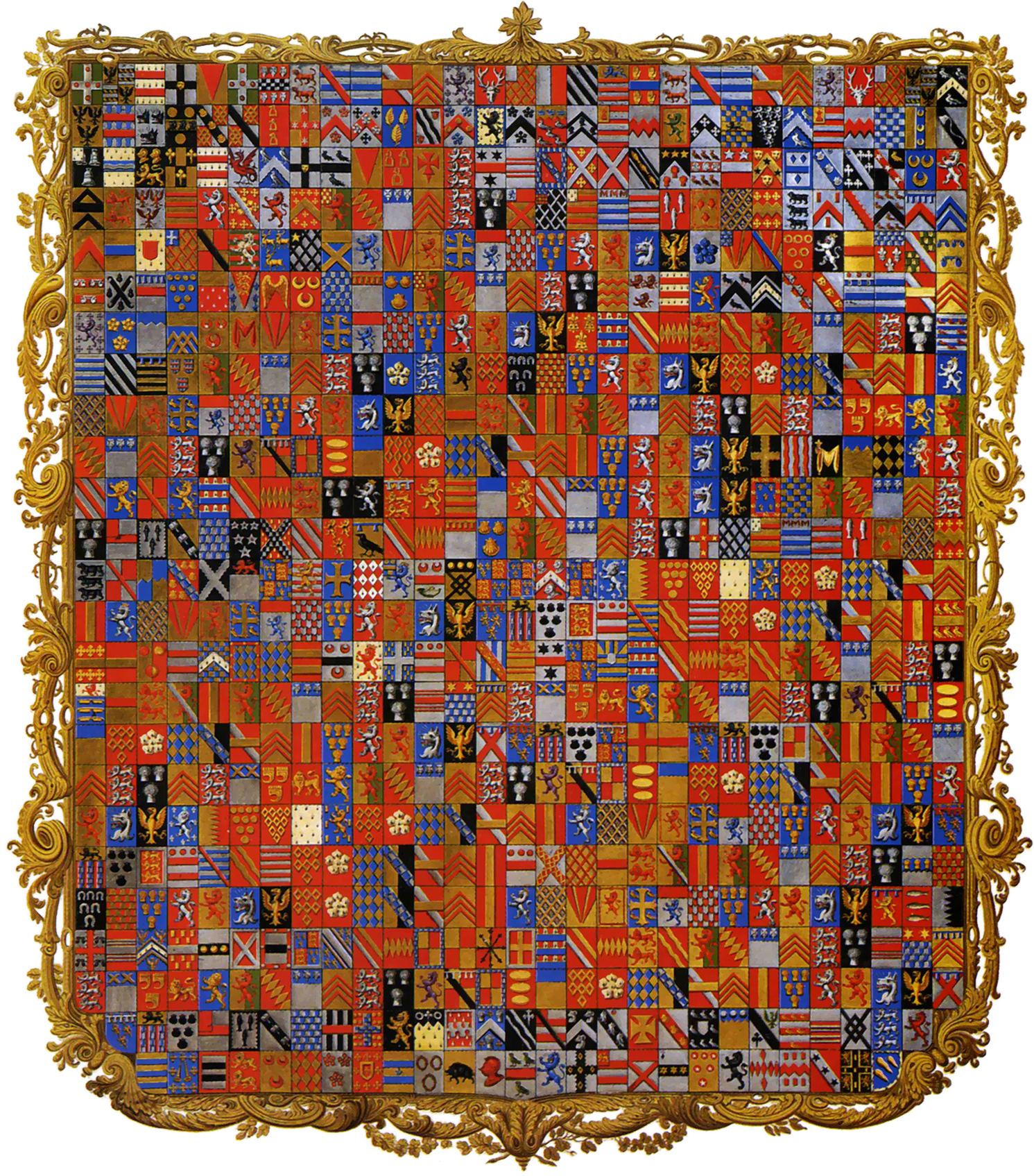
The 719 heraldic quarterings of the dukes of Buckingham from the Temple-Nugent-Brydges-Chandos-Grenville family

The fourth creation of the dukedom, as Duke of Buckingham and Chandos in the Peerage of the United Kingdom, was in 1822 for Richard Temple-Grenville, 2nd Marquess of Buckingham, a landowner and politician.

He was the son of George Nugent Temple Grenville, 3rd Earl Temple, who was the son of Prime Minister George Grenville, and who had been created Marquess of Buckingham in the peerage of Great Britain in 1784. The 1st Marquess of Buckingham had married Lady Mary Nugent, daughter of Robert Nugent, 1st Earl Nugent. Mary was in 1800 created Baroness Nugent in her own right in the Peerage of Ireland, with remainder to her second son George (see the Baron Nugent). In 1788 Lord Buckingham also succeeded his father-in-law as second Earl Nugent according to a special remainder in the letters patent, and at the same time assumed by Royal licence the additional surname of Nugent.

After the 1st Marquess of Buckingham's death in 1813, his titles passed to his son Richard Temple-Grenville, 2nd Marquess of Buckingham. He married Lady Anne Eliza Brydges, the only child of James Brydges, 3rd Duke of Chandos (a title which became extinct on his death in 1789), and assumed by Royal licence the additional surnames of Brydges-Chandos in 1799. In 1822 Lord Buckingham was created Earl Temple of Stowe, in the County of Buckingham, Marquess of Chandos and Duke of Buckingham and Chandos, all in the Peerage of the United Kingdom. The earldom was created with remainder, failing male issue of his own, to (1) the heirs male of the body of his deceased great-grandmother Hester Grenville, 1st Countess Temple, and (2) in default thereof to his granddaughter Lady Anne Eliza Mary Temple-Nugent-Brydges-Chandos-Grenville, daughter of his son Richard, who succeeded as second Duke in 1839.

After the 2nd Duke of Buckingham and Chandos' death in 1861, the titles passed to his son, the third Duke. He was also a prominent politician and served as Lord President of the Council and as Secretary of State for the Colonies. In 1868 the Duke established his right to the Scottish lordship of Kinloss before the Committee for Privileges of the House of Lords. On his death in 1889 without male issue, the dukedom and its subsidiary titles (the marquessate of Buckingham, marquessate of Chandos, earldom of Temple and earldom of Nugent) became extinct. The lordship of Kinloss passed to his daughter Mary. The earldom of Temple of Stowe passed to his sister's son William Temple-Gore-Langton because the title had been created with a special remainder to her heirs male. The viscountcy of Cobham, which had also been created with a special remainder, passed to Charles Lyttelton, 5th Baron Lyttelton, a descendant of Hester Grenville, 1st Countess Temple's sister Christian, who had married Sir Thomas Lyttelton, 4th Baronet.

== List of title holders ==
=== Dukes of Buckingham (1444) ===
- Humphrey Stafford (1402–1460), 1st Duke of Buckingham, created Duke of Buckingham in 1444
  - Humphrey Stafford (1425–1458), styled Earl of Stafford, eldest son of the 1st Duke, predeceased his father
- Henry Stafford (1455–1483), 2nd Duke of Buckingham, only son of Humphrey Stafford, was attainted for treason in 1483
- Edward Stafford (1477–1521), 3rd Duke of Buckingham, eldest son of the 2nd Duke, was restored to his father's honours in 1485, but then executed for treason in 1521 and posthumously attainted in 1523

Stafford family tree: Dukes of Buckingham, 1st creation

Feudal barony of Stafford
Nicholas de Stafford d. 1287
Baron Audley (2nd creation), 1317; Earl of Gloucester (3rd creation), 1337	Baron Stafford (1st creation), 1299
Hugh de Audley c. 1291–1347; Earl of Gloucester, 1st Baron Audley	Edmund de Stafford; 1272/1273–1308; 1st Baron Stafford
Earldom of Gloucester (3rd creation), extinct 1347
Earl of Stafford (1st creation), 1350	Baron Stafford (2nd creation) of Clifton, 1371
Margaret de Audley; 1318–1349 suo jure 2nd Baroness Audley	Ralph de Stafford; 1301–1372; 1st Earl of Stafford, 2nd Baron Stafford	Richard Stafford d. 1380; Baron Stafford of Clifton
Ralph de Stafford d. 1347	Hugh de Stafford; 1342–1386; 2nd Earl of Stafford, 3rd Baron Stafford, 3rd Baron Audley	Edmund Stafford; 1344–1419; 2nd Baron Stafford of Clifton	Thomas Stafford d. 1425; 3rd Baron Stafford of Clifton
Margaret de Stafford c. 1364–1396; Baroness Neville de Raby	Ralph Stafford c. 1367–1385	William Stafford; 1375–1395; 4th Earl of Stafford, 5th Baron Stafford	Katherine Stafford c. 1376–1419	Joan Stafford; 1378–1442; Duchess of Surrey	Thomas Stafford d. 1445; 4th Baron Stafford of Clifton
Baron Stafford (3rd creation), 1411	Barony Stafford (2nd creation) of Clifton in abeyance, 1445
Thomas Stafford c. 1368–1392; 3rd Earl of Stafford, 4th Baron Stafford	Anne of Gloucester; 1383–1438	Edmund Stafford; 1377–1403; 5th Earl of Stafford, 6th Baron Stafford	Hugh Stafford c. 1382–1420; 4th Baron Bourchier jure uxoris 1st Baron Stafford
Duke of Buckingham (first creation), 1444
Humphrey Stafford c. 1368–1392; 1st Duke of Buckingham, 6th Earl of Stafford, 7th Baron Stafford
Humphrey Stafford c. 1425–1458 styled Earl of Stafford
Edward IV; 1442–1483	Elizabeth Woodville c. 1437–1492	Jasper Tudor	Katherine Woodville c. 1458–1497	Henry Stafford; 1455–1483; 2nd Duke of Buckingham, 7th Earl of Stafford, 8th Baron Stafford
Dukedom of Buckingham and subsidiary titles forfeit, 1483
Dukedom of Buckingham and subsidiary titles restored, 1485
Edward Stafford; 1478–1521; 3rd Duke of Buckingham, 8th Earl of Stafford, 9th Baron Stafford
Dukedom of Buckingham and subsidiary titles forfeit, 1521 and posthumously attained, 1523
Baron Stafford (4th creation), 1547; Recognized as carrying precedence from 1st creation, 1558
Henry Stafford; 1501–1563 (styled Earl of Stafford until 1523), 1st Baron Stafford
Henry Stafford d. 1566; 2nd Baron Stafford	Edward Stafford; 1535–1603; 3rd Baron Stafford	Richard Stafford
Edward Stafford; 1572–1625; 4th Baron Stafford	Roger Stafford c. 1572–1640; 6th Baron Stafford
Barony Stafford (4th creation) surrendered due to poverty, 1639
Edward Stafford; 1602–1621
Viscount Stafford and Baron Stafford (5th joint creation), 1640	Baron Stafford (5th joint creation), 1640; Countess of Stafford for life, 1688
William Howard; 1614–1680; 1st Viscount Stafford and Baron Stafford	Mary Howard; 1619–1693; Countess of Stafford for life and suo jure 1st Baroness Stafford	Edward Stafford; 1621–1637; 5th Baron Stafford
All titles attainted, 1680	All titles attainted, 1680
Earl of Stafford (2nd creation), 1688; Baron Stafford de jure, 1693
Henry Stafford-Howard c. 1648–1719; 1st Earl of Stafford, 2nd Baron Stafford de jure	Anastasia Stafford-Howard	John Stafford-Howard d. 1714
Anne Holman d. 1725	William Stafford-Howard c. 1690–1734; 2nd Earl of Stafford, 3rd Baron Stafford de jure	Mary Stafford-Howard d. 1765	John Paul Stafford-Howard; 1700–1762; 4th Earl of Stafford, 5th Baron Stafford de jure
Jerningham baronets	Earldom extinct, 1762
William Matthias Stafford-Howard; 1719–1751; 3rd Earl of Stafford, 4th Baron Stafford de jure	Anastasia Stafford; 1722–1807; 6th Baroness Stafford	Marie "Mary" Françoise Plowden; 1704–c. 1785	George Jerningham; 1680–1774; 5th Baronet Jerningham of Cossey
William Jerningham; 1736–1809; 7th Baron Stafford de jure, 6th Baronet Jerningham of Cossey
Attainder reversed, 1824
George William Stafford-Jerningham; 1771–1851; 8th Baron Stafford, 7th Baronet Jerningham of Cossey	William Charles Jerningham; 1772–1820
Henry Valentine Stafford-Jerningham; 1802–1884; 9th Baron Stafford, 8th Baronet Jerningham of Cossey	Edward Stafford-Jerningham; 1804–1849	Frederick William Jerningham; 1813–1870
Augustus Frederick Fitzherbert Stafford-Jerningham; 1830–1892; 10th Baron Stafford, 9th Baronet Jerningham of Cossey	Fitzherbert Stafford-Jerningham; 1833–1913; 11th Baron Stafford, 10th Baronet Jerningham of Cossey	Emily Charlotte Stafford-Jerningham; 1835–1881	Adolphus Fredeick James Jerningham; 1842–1904
Francis Edward Fitzherbert-Stafford; 1859–1932; 12th Baron Stafford	Edward Stafford Fitzherbert; 1864–1941; 13th Baron Stafford	Thomas Charles Fitzherbert; 1869–1937	William Henry Stafford Jerningham; 1867–1935; 11th Baronet Jerningham of Cossey
Baronetcy Jerningham of Cossey extinct, 1935
Basil Francis Nicholas Fitzherbert; 1926–1986; 14th Baron Stafford
Francis Melfort William Fitzherbert b. 1954; 15th Baron Stafford
Benjamin John Basil Fitzherbert b. 1983; Heir apparent to the Stafford Barony

=== Dukes of Buckingham (1623) ===
- George Villiers (1592–1628), 1st Duke of Buckingham, created Duke of Buckingham and Earl of Coventry in 1623
- George Villiers (1628–1687), 2nd Duke of Buckingham, younger son of the 1st Duke

Villiers family tree including the Dukes of Buckingham (2nd creation), Earls of Clarendon, Earls of Jersey, and Earls of Rochester

John St John by 1495–1558
Nicholas St. John by 1526–1589
Viscount Grandison of Limerick, 1620; Baron Tregoz, 1626	Earl (Countess) of Buckingham (5th creation), 1618
John St. John c. 1552–1594	Oliver St. John c. 1560–1630; 1st Viscount Grandison, etc.	Mary (Beaumont) Villiers c. 1570–1632; Countess of Buckingham	George Villiers (of Brokesby) c. 1544–1606
Barony Tregoz extinct, 1630	Earldom for life only, extinct 1632
Villiers baronets, 1619	Viscount Purbeck and Baron Villiers of Stoke, 1619	Viscount Villiers and Baron Whaddon, 1616; Earl of Buckingham (4th creation), 1617; Marquess of Buckingham (1st creation), 1618; Duke of Buckingham (2nd creation) and Earl of Coventry (1st creation), 1623	Earl of Anglesey (1st creation) and Baron Villiers of Daventry, 1623
William Villiers c. 1575–1629; 1st Baronet	Susan (Villiers) Feilding; 1583–1652 (m. William Feilding, 1st Earl of Denbigh)	Barbara St John	Edward Villiers c. 1585–1626	John Villiers c. 1591–1658; Viscount Purbeck, etc.	Katherine Manners; 1603–1649; Baroness de Ros	George Villiers; 1592–1628; 1st Duke of Buckingham, etc.	Christopher Villiers c. 1593–1630; 1st Earl of Anglesey, etc.
Viscountcy of Purbeck extinct, 1658
Baron Hyde of Hindon (1st creation), 1660; Earl of Clarendon (1st creation) and Viscount Cornbury, 1661
George Villiers; 1620–1682; 2nd Baronet	William Villiers; 1614–1643; 2nd Viscount Grandison	John Villiers c. 1616–1659; 3rd Viscount Grandison	George Villiers; 1618–1699; 4th Viscount Grandison	Edward Villiers; 1620–1689	George Villiers; 1628–1687; 2nd Duke of Buckingham, etc., Baron de Ros	Christopher Villiers d. 1661; 2nd Earl of Anglesey, etc.	Edward Hyde; 1609–1674; 1st Earl of Clarendon, etc.
Dukedom of Buckingham (2nd creation) and subsidiary titles extinct, 1687	Earldom of Anglesey (1st creation) and subsidiary title extinct extinct, 1661
Earl of Rochester 2nd creation, Viscount Hyde, and Baron Wotton Basset, 1682
George Villiers; 1645–1712; 3rd Baronet	Barbara (Villiers) Palmer; 1640–1709; Duchess of Cleveland, Countess of Castlemaine, Baroness Nonsuch	King Charles II; 1630–1685	King James II; 1633–1701	Anne Hyde; 1637–1671	Henry Hyde; 1638–1709; 2nd Earl of Clarendon, etc.	Laurence Hyde; 1642–1711; 1st Earl of Rochester, etc.
Villiars Baronets extinct, 1712	Viscount Villiers and Baron Villiers of Hoo, 1691; Earl of Jersey, 1697
Edward FitzGerald-Villiers c. 1654–1693	Edward Villiers c. 1656–1711; 1st Earl of Jersey, etc.	Queen Mary II; 1662–1694	Queen Anne; 1665–1714	Edward Hyde; 1661–1723; 3rd Earl of Clarendon, etc.	Henry Hyde; 1672–1753; 4th Earl of Clarendon, etc., 2nd Earl of Rochester, etc.
Earldom of Clarendon (1st creation) and subsidiary titles extinct, 1753
Earl Grandison (1st creation), 1721
John Villiers c. 1684–1766; Earl Grandison, 5th Viscount Grandison	Harriet Villiers; 1680–1736	William Villiers c. 1682–1721; 2nd Earl of Jersey, etc.	Jane Capell; 1694–1724; Countess of Essex
Earldom of Grandison (1st creation) extinct, 1766
Viscount Grandison (2nd creation), 1746; Earl Grandison (2nd creation), 1767	Baron Hyde of Hindon (2nd creation), 1756; Earl of Clarendon (2nd creation), 1776
James FitzGerald-Villiers; 1708–1732 styled Lord Villiers	Elizabeth Villiers d. 1782; 1st Countess Grandison, etc.	William Pitt "the Elder"; 1708–1778; Earl of Chatham, Prime Minister	William Villiers d. 1769; 3rd Earl of Jersey, etc., 6th Viscount Grandison	Thomas Villiers; 1709–1786; 1st Earl of Clarendon, etc.	Charlotte Capell; 1721–1790	Mary Capell d. 1782 (m. Henry Seymour, Lord Beauchamp)	Henry Hyde; 1710–1753; 5th Baron Hyde
George Mason-Villiers; 1751–1800; 2nd Earl Grandison, etc.	William Pitt "the Younger"; 1759–1806; Prime Minister	George Bussy Villiers; 1735–1805; 4th Earl of Jersey, etc., 7th Viscount Grandison
Earldom of Grandison (2nd creation) and Viscountcy Grandison (2nd creation) extinct, 1800
Child added to name by royal license, 1819
George Child Villiers; 1773–1859; 5th Earl of Jersey, etc., 8th Viscount Grandison (m. Sarah Sophia Fay)	Thomas Villiers; 1753–1824; 2nd Earl of Clarendon, etc.	John Charles Villiers; 1757–1838; 3rd Earl of Clarendon, etc.	Maria Villiers; 1761–1844	George Villiers; 1759–1827
George Augustus Frederick Child Villiers; 1808–1859; 6th Earl of Jersey, etc., 9th Viscount Grandison	Francis John Robert Child Villiers; 1819–1862	George William Frederick Villiers; 1800–1870; 4th Earl of Clarendon, etc.	Thomas Hyde Villiers; 1801–1832 Charles Pelham Villiers; 1802–1893	Maria Theresa Lewis; 1803–1865 Henry Montagu Villiers; 1813–1861
Victor Albert George Child Villiers; 1845–1915; 7th Earl of Jersey, etc., 10th Viscount Grandison (m. Margaret Elizabeth Leigh)	Emily Theresa Russell; 1843–1927 (m. Odo Russell, 1st Baron Ampthill)	Edward Hyde Villiers; 1845–1846	Edward Hyde Villiers; 1846–1914; 5th Earl of Clarendon, etc.	Francis Hyde Villiers; 1852–1925
George Henry Robert Child Villiers; 1873–1923; 8th Earl of Jersey, etc., 11th Viscount Grandison	George Herbert Hyde Villiers; 1877–1955; 6th Earl of Clarendon, etc.	Eric Hyde Villiers; 1881–1964
George Francis Child-Villiers; 1910–1998; 9th Earl of Jersey, etc., 12th Viscount Grandison (m. Virginia Cherrill)	George Herbert Arthur Hyde Villiers; 1906–1935 styled Lord Hyde
George Henry Child Villiers; 1948–1998 styled Viscount Villiers	George Frederick "Laurence" Hyde Villiers; 1933–2009; 7th Earl of Clarendon, etc.	James Villiers; 1933–1998
George Francis "William" Child Villiers b. 1976; 10th Earl of Jersey, etc., 13th Viscount Grandison	George Edward Laurence Villiers b. 1976; 8th Earl of Clarendon, etc.
Amelie Natasha Sophia Child Villiers b. 2008	George Henry William Child Villiers b. 2015 styled Viscount Villiers	Edward George James Villiers b. 2008 styled Lord Hyde
Heir apparent to the Earl of Jersey	Heir apparent to the Earl of Clarendon

=== Dukes of Buckingham and Normanby (1703) ===
- John Sheffield (1648–1721), 1st Duke of Buckingham and Normanby, created Duke of Buckingham and Normanby in 1703
  - John Sheffield (1710), styled Marquess of Normanby
  - Robert Sheffield (1711–1714), styled Marquess of Normanby
- Edmund Sheffield (1716–1735), 2nd Duke of Buckingham and Normanby

Sheffield family tree: Barons Sheffield, Earls of Mulgrave and Dukes of Buckingham and Normanby

Baron Sheffield (1st creation, England), 1547
Edmund Sheffield; 1521–1549; 1st Baron Sheffield
John Sheffield c. 1538–1568; 2nd Baron Sheffield
Earl of Mulgrave (1st creation), 1626
Edmund Sheffield c. 1564–1646; 1st Earl of Mulgrave, 3rd Baron Sheffield
James II; 1633–1701; King of England and Scotland	Edmund Sheffield; 1611–1658; 2nd Earl of Mulgrave, 4th Baron Sheffield
Marquess of Normanby (1st creation), 1694; Duke of Buckingham and Normanby, 1703
Catherine Darnley; 1680–1743	John Sheffield; 1648–1721; 1st Duke of Buckingham and Normanby, etc., 3rd Earl of Mulgrave, 5th Baron Sheffield
William Phipps	Catherine Annesley d. 1743	John Sheffield; 1710 styled Marquess of Nomanby	Robert Sheffield; 1711–1714 styled Marquess of Nomanby	Edmund Sheffield; 1716–1735; 2nd Duke of Buckingham and Normanby, etc., 4th Earl of Mulgrave, 6th Baron Sheffield
Dukedom of Buckingham and Normanby, Marquess of Nomanby (1st creation), Earl of Mulgrave, and Baron Sheffield (1st creation) extinct, 1735
Baron Mulgrave (Ireland, 1st creation), 1767
Constantine Phipps c. 1722–1775; 1st Baron Mulgrave
Baron Sheffield of Dunnamore in the County of Meath, (2nd creation, Ireland), 1781; Baron Sheffield of Roscommon in the County of Roscommon, (3rd creation, Ireland), 1783
Baron Mulgrave (Great Britain, 1st creation), 1790	Baron Mulgrave (Great Britain (2nd creation), recreated, 1794; Viscount Normanby; Earl of Mulgrave (2nd creation), 1812	Baron Sheffield of Sheffield in the County of York, (4th creation, United Kingdom), 1802; Earl of Sheffield (Ireland) and Viscount Pevensey (Ireland), 1816
Constantine John Phipps; 1744–1792; 2nd Baron Mulgrave (Ireland); 1st Baron Mulgrave (Great Britain)	Henry Phipps; 1755–1831; 1st Earl of Mulgrave, etc., 3rd Baron Mulgrave (Ireland)	John Baker-Holroyd; 1735–1821; 1st Earl of Sheffield, etc.
Barony Mulgrave (Great Britain) extinct, 1792	Baron Stanley of Alderley, 1839
John Thomas Stanley; 1766–1850; 1st Baron Stanley	Maria Josepha Holroyd; 1771–1863
Marquess of Normanby (2nd creation), 1838	Baron Eddisbury, 1848
Constantine Henry Phipps; 1797–1863; 1st Marquess of Normanby, 2nd Earl of Mulgrave, etc., 4th Baron Mulgrave (Ireland)	Edward John Stanley; 1802–1869; 2nd Baron Stanley, 1st Baron Eddisbury	George Augustus Frederick Charles Holroyd; 1802–1876; 2nd Earl of Sheffield, etc.
George Augustus Constantine Phipps; 1819–1890; 2nd Marquess of Normanby, 3rd Earl of Mulgrave, etc., 5th Baron Mulgrave (Ireland)	Henry Edward John Stanley; 1827–1903; 3rd Baron Stanley, 2nd Baron Eddisbury	Fredrick Henry Stuart Holroyd; 1827–1829 styled Viscount Pevensey	Henry North Holroyd; 1832–1909; 3rd Earl of Sheffield, etc.
Earldom of Sheffield, Viscount Pevensey, and Baron Sheffield (2nd and 4th creations), extinct 1909
Constantine Charles Henry Phipps; 1846–1932; 3rd Marquess of Normanby, 4th Earl of Mulgrave, etc., 6th Baron Mulgrave (Ireland)	Edward Lyulph Stanley; 1839–1925; 4th Baron Sheffield (3rd creation, Ireland); 4th Baron Stanley, 3rd Baron Eddisbury
Arthur Lyulph Stanley; 1875–1931; 5th Baron Sheffield, 5th Baron Stanley, 4th Baron Eddisbury	Oliver Hugh Stanley; 1879–1952
Oswald Constantine John Phipps; 1912–1994; 4th Marquess of Normanby, 5th Earl of Mulgrave, etc., 7th Baron Mulgrave (Ireland)	Edward John Stanley; 1907–1971; 6th Baron Sheffield, 6th Baron Stanley, 5th Baron Eddisbury	Lyulph Henry Victor Owen Stanley; 1915–1971; 7th Baron Sheffield, 7th Baron Stanley, 6th Baron Eddisbury	Thomas Henry Oliver Stanley; 1927–2013; 8th Baron Sheffield, 8th Baron Stanley, 7th Baron Eddisbury
Constantine Edmund Walter Phipps b. 1954; 5th Marquess of Normanby, 6th Earl of Mulgrave, etc., 8th Baron Mulgrave (Ireland)	Richard Oliver Stanley b. 1956; 9th Baron Sheffield, 9th Baron Stanley, 8th Baron Eddisbury	Charles Ernest Stanley b. 1960
Heir presumptive to the Baronies Sheffield, Stanley, and Eddisbury
John Samuel Constantine Phipps b. 1994 styled Earl of Mulgrave	Thomas Henry Winston Phipps b. 1997	Oliver Richard Hugh Stanley; 1986–1989
Heir apparent to the Marquessate of Normanby

=== Dukes of Buckingham and Chandos (1822) ===
- Richard Temple-Nugent-Brydges-Chandos-Grenville (1776–1839), 1st Duke of Buckingham and Chandos, created Duke of Buckingham and Chandos in 1822
- Richard Plantagenet Temple-Nugent-Brydges-Chandos-Grenville (1797–1861), 2nd Duke of Buckingham and Chandos
- Richard Plantagenet Campbell Temple-Nugent-Brydges-Chandos-Grenville (1823–1889), 3rd Duke of Buckingham and Chandos

Family tree of the Duke of Buckingham and Chandos, Marquess of Buckingham, Marquess of Chandos, Viscount Cobham, Earl Temple, Earl Temple of Stowe, Baron Cobham, Baron Grenville, Baron Lyttelton, Baron Westcote and Temple baronets

Peter Temple
Anthony Temple	John Temple
Baronet, of Stowe, in the County of Buckingham, 1611
William Temple; 1555–1627	Thomas Temple; 1567–1637; 1st Baronet, of Stowe	Alexander Temple; 1583–1629
Baronet, of Frankley, in the County of Worcester, 1618
John Temple; 1600–1677	Peter Temple; 1592–1653; 2nd Baronet, of Stowe	John Temple; 1593–1632	James Temple; 1606–1680	Thomas Lyttelton; 1593–1650; 1st Baronet, of Frankley
Baronet, of Stowe, in the County of Buckingham, 1662
Thomas Temple; 1613/14–1674; 1st Baronet, of Stowe	Peter Temple; 1613–1660	Henry Lyttelton; 1624–1693; 2nd Baronet, of Frankley	Charles Lyttelton; 1628–1716; 3rd Baronet, of Frankley
Baronetcy of Stowe (1662 creation) extinct, 1674
John Temple; 1632–1705	Richard Temple; 1634–1697; 3rd Baronet, of Stowe	Eleanor Temple d. 1729 m. Richard Grenville	William Temple d. 1706
Viscount Palmerston and Baron Temple, of Mount Temple in the County of Sligo, 1723	Baron Cobham, of Cobham in the County of Kent (6th creation), 1714; Viscount Cobham and Baron Cobham, of Cobham in the County of Kent (7th creation), 1718	Earl Temple, 1749
Henry Temple c. 1673–1757; 1st Viscount Palmerston and Baron Temple	Richard Temple; 1675–1749; 1st Viscount Cobham, etc., 4th Baronet, of Stowe	Hester Grenville c. 1690–1752; 1st Countess Temple, 2nd Viscountess Cobham and 2nd Baroness Cobham	Richard Grenville; 1678–1727	Christian Temple	Thomas Lyttelton; 1686–1751; 4th Baronet, of Frankley	William Temple; 1694–1760; 5th Baronet, of Stowe	Peter Temple d. 1761; 6th Baronet, of Stowe
Barony of Cobham (1714 creation) extinct, 1749
Henry, Lord Temple	Richard Temple; 1731–1786; 7th Baronet, of Stowe
Baron Lyttelton (1st creation), 1756	Baron Westcote, 1776; Baron Lyttelton (2nd creation), 1794	Baronetcy of Stowe dormant, 1786
Henry Temple; 1739–1802; 2nd Viscount Palmerston and Baron Temple	Richard Grenville-Temple; 1711–1779; 2nd Earl Temple, 3rd Viscount Cobham, etc.	George Grenville; 1712–1770	Hester Grenville; 1720–1803; Baroness Chatham m. William Pitt the Elder, Earl of Chatham and Viscount Pitt	George Lyttelton; 1709–1773; 1st Baron Lyttelton, 5th Baronet, of Frankley	William Henry Lyttelton; 1724–1808; 1st Baron Lyttelton
Marquess of Buckingham (2nd creation), 1784	Baron Grenville, of Wotton under Bernewood in the County of Buckingham, 1790
George Nugent-Temple-Grenville; 1753–1813; 1st Marquess of Buckingham, 3rd Earl Temple, 2nd Earl Nugent, 4th Viscount Cobham, etc.	William Wyndham Grenville; 1759–1834; 1st Baron Grenville	William Pitt the Younger; 1759–1806	Thomas Lyttelton; 1744–1779; 2nd Baron Lyttelton, 5th Baronet, of Frankley
Barony of Grenville extinct, 1834	Barony of Lyttelton and Baronetcy of Frankley extinct, 1779
Duke of Buckingham and Chandos, Marquess of Chandos and Earl Temple of Stowe, 1822
Henry John Temple; 1784–1865; 3rd Viscount Palmerston and Baron Temple	Richard Temple-Nugent-Brydges-Chandos-Grenville; 1776–1839; 1st Duke of Buckingham and Chandos, Marquess of Chandos, and Earl Temple of Stowe, 2nd Marquess of Buckingham, 3rd Earl Nugent, 4th Earl Temple, 5th Viscount Cobham, etc.	George Fulke Lyttelton; 1763–1828; 2nd Baron Lyttelton	William Henry Lyttelton; 1782–1837; 3rd Baron Lyttelton
Richard Plantagenet Temple-Nugent-Brydges-Chandos-Grenville; 1797–1861; 2nd Duke of Buckingham and Chandos, Marquess of Chandos, and Earl Temple of Stowe, 3rd Marquess of Buckingham, 4th Earl Nugent, 6th Viscount Cobham, etc.
Richard Plantagenet Campbell Temple-Nugent-Brydges-Chandos-Grenville; 1823–1889; 3rd Duke of Buckingham and Chandos, Marquess of Chandos, and Earl Temple of Stowe, 4th Marquess of Buckingham, 5th Earl Nugent, 6th Earl Temple, 7th Viscount Cobham, etc.	Anna Eliza Mary (Temple-Nugent-Brydges-Chandos-Grenville) Gore-Langton; 1820–1879	William Henry Powell Gore-Langton; 1824–1873	George William Lyttelton; 1817–1876; 4th Baron Lyttelton
Dukedom of Buckingham and Chandos, Marquessates of Buckingham and Chandos, and the Earldoms of Temple (1st creation) and of Nugent extinct, 1889
William Stephen Temple-Gore-Langton; 1847–1902; 4th Earl Temple of Stowe	Charles George Lyttelton; 1842–1922; 8th Viscount Cobham, etc.
Algernon William Stephen Temple-Gore-Langton; 1871–1940; 5th Earl Temple of Stowe	Chandos Graham Temple-Gore-Langton; 1873–1921	Evelyn Arthur Grenville Temple-Gore-Langton; 1884–1972	John Cavendish Lyttelton; 1881–1949; 9th Viscount Cobham, etc.
Chandos Grenville Temple-Gore-Langton; 1909–1966; 6th Earl Temple of Stowe	Ronald Stephen Brydges Temple-Gore-Langton; 1910–1988; 7th Earl Temple of Stowe	Walter Grenville Algernon Temple-Gore-Langton; 1924–2013; 8th Earl Temple of Stowe	Charles John Lyttelton; 1909–1977; 10th Viscount Cobham, etc.
James Grenville Temple-Gore-Langton b. 1955; 9th Earl Temple of Stowe	John William Leonard Lyttelton; 1943–2006; 11th Viscount Cobham, etc.	Christopher Charles Lyttelton b. 1947; 12th Viscount Cobham, etc.
Rowan Caradoc Temple-Gore-Langton b. 1987	Oliver Christopher Lyttelton b. 1976
Heir apparent to the Earl Temple of Stowe	Heir apparent to the Viscount Cobham

== See also ==
- Duchess of Buckingham
- Earl of Anglesey (1623 creation)
- Viscount Purbeck
- Earl of Jersey
- Earl of Clarendon (1776 creation)
