= Countess of Stafford =

Countess of Stafford is a title given to the wife of the Earl of Stafford. Women who have held the title include:

- Margaret de Audley, 2nd Baroness Audley (1318-c.1351; her husband became earl in 1350)
- Philippa de Beauchamp (c.1344–1386)
- Anne of Gloucester (1383–1438), wife of both the 3rd Earl and, after his death, the 5th Earl
- Anne Stafford, Duchess of Buckingham (died 1480), whose husband was created Duke of Buckingham in 1444
- Margaret Beaufort, Countess of Stafford (c.1437–1474)
- Mary Howard, Countess of Stafford (died 1693), wife of William Howard, 1st Viscount Stafford Countess in her own right; see list of peerages created for women
