= William Stafford-Howard, 3rd Earl of Stafford =

English peer

The Right Honourable The Earl of Stafford FRS
- Born: William Matthias Stafford-Howard; 24 February 1719
- Died: 28 February 1751 (aged 32)
- Spouse: Henrietta Cantillon (m. 1743)
- Parent(s): William Stafford-Howard, 2nd Earl of Stafford; Anne Holman
- Relatives: Guy Auguste de Rohan-Chabot (brother-in-law)

William Matthias Stafford-Howard, 3rd Earl of Stafford, de jure 4th Baron Stafford FRS (24 February 1719 – 28 February 1751) was an English peer.

== Early life ==
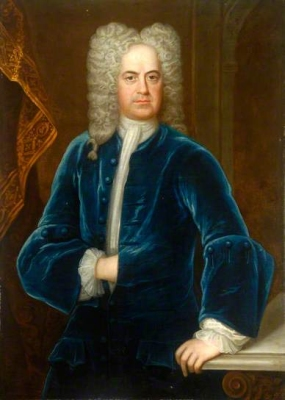
Portrait of his father, the 2nd Earl of Stafford, by Godfrey Kneller, 1730

Stafford-Howard was born on 24 February 1719. He was the only son of Anne Holman (d. 1725) and William Stafford-Howard, 2nd Earl of Stafford, who were first cousins. His younger sisters were Lady Mary Stafford-Howard (who married, as his second wife, Count Guy Auguste de Rohan-Chabot, son of Louis, Duke of Rohan), Lady Anastasia Stafford-Howard and Lady Anne Stafford-Howard, who both became nuns.

His paternal grandparents were the former Mary Southcote (a daughter of Sir John Southcote) and John Stafford-Howard (a son of the 1st Viscount Stafford), who served as King James II's Ambassador to King Louis XIV when the former was exiled at Saint-Germain. After the King's death, his father served as vice-chamberlain to the King's widow, Queen Mary. Among his extended family was aunt Mary Stafford-Howard (wife of Francis Plowden, MP for Bannow) and uncle John Stafford-Howard. His maternal grandparents were George Holman of Warkworth, Northamptonshire and Anastasia Howard (a daughter of the 1st Viscount Stafford).

== Career ==
On the death of his father, (Note: His father had succeeded to the title from his uncle, Henry Stafford-Howard, 1st Earl of Stafford, who had married Claude-Charlotte, daughter of Philibert de Gramont and his wife, Elizabeth (a daughter of Sir George Hamilton), but died without issue.) in January 1734, he succeeded as the 3rd Earl of Stafford. He also succeeded as the de jure 4th Baron Stafford of Stafford Castle.

In 1743, Lord Stafford was appointed a Fellow of the Royal Society. He inherited a number of English estates from his Holman family members, which he sold in 1749 to Edward Greenly of Doctors' Commons.

== Personal life ==
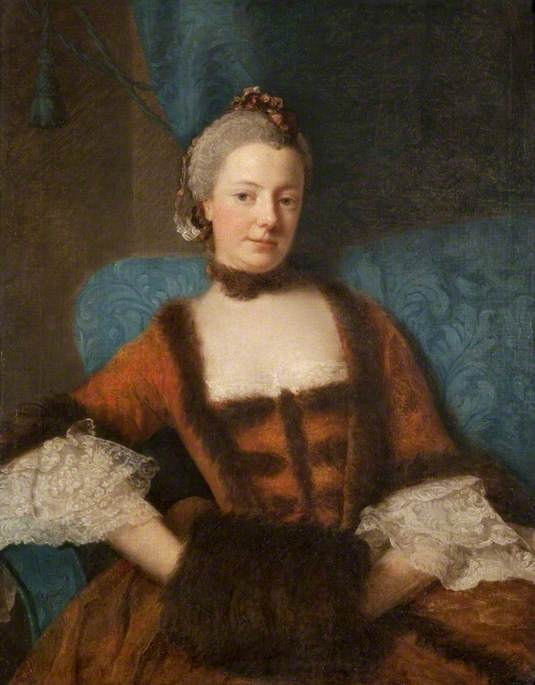
Portrait of his wife, Henrietta Diana, Dowager Countess of Stafford, by Allan Ramsay, 1759

In 1743, he married Henrietta Diana Cantillon, daughter of economist Richard Cantillon and Mary O'Mahony (a daughter of Gen. Count Daniel O'Mahony).

Lord Stafford died, without legitimate issue, on 28 February 1751. His widow Henrietta married Robert Maxwell, 1st Earl of Farnham. (Note: From her second marriage, Henrietta was the mother of a daughter, Lady Henrietta Maxwell, who married the Irish politician Denis Daly.) Upon the death of his uncle in 1762, the earldom became extinct but the barony of Stafford reverted to Anastasia Stafford-Howard as senior heir general of William Howard, 1st Viscount Stafford and his wife Mary Howard, Countess of Stafford.

Peerage of England
| Preceded by William Stafford-Howard | Earl of Stafford; 1734–1751 | Succeeded by John Paul Stafford-Howard |
