= HMS Bedford (1901) =

Royal Navy Monmouth-class armored cruiser

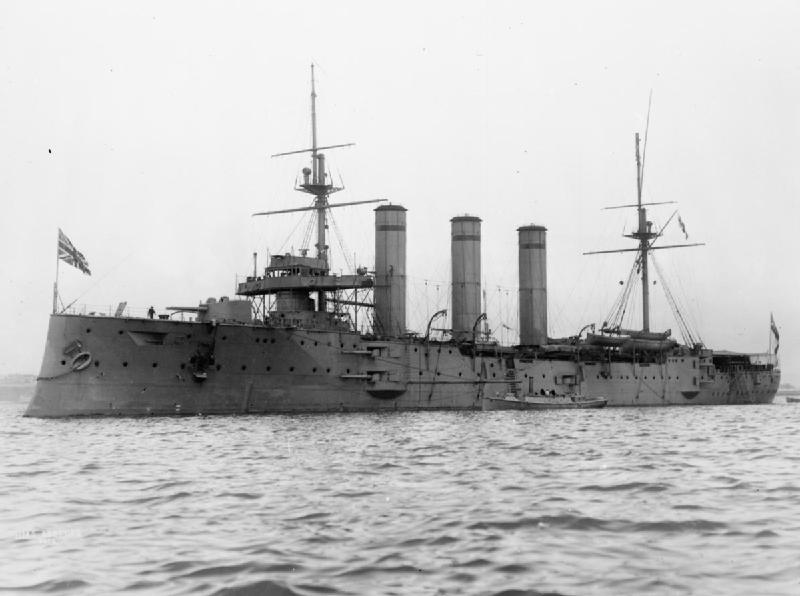
- Bedford at anchor

History

United Kingdom
- Name: Bedford
- Namesake: Bedfordshire
- Builder: Fairfield Shipbuilding & Engineering, Govan
- Laid down: 19 February 1900
- Launched: 31 August 1901
- Christened: Hon. Mrs. James C. Burns
- Completed: 11 November 1903
- Fate: Wrecked, 21 August 1910

General characteristics
- Class & type: Monmouth-class armoured cruiser
- Displacement: 9,800 long tons (10,000 t) (normal)
- Length: 463 ft 6 in (141.3 m) (o/a)
- Beam: 66 ft (20.1 m)
- Draught: 25 ft (7.6 m)
- Installed power: 31 water-tube boilers; 22,000 ihp (16,000 kW)
- Propulsion: 2 × shafts; 2 × triple-expansion steam engines
- Speed: 23 knots (43 km/h; 26 mph)
- Complement: 678
- Armament: 2 × twin, 10 × single 6 in (152 mm) guns; 10 × single 12-pdr (3 in (76 mm)) guns; 3 × single 3-pdr (1.9 in (47 mm)) guns; 2 × 18 in (450 mm) torpedo tubes
- Armour: Belt: 2–4 in (51–102 mm); Decks: 0.75–2 in (19–51 mm); Barbettes: 4 in (102 mm); Turrets: 4 in (102 mm); Conning tower: 10 in (254 mm)

HMS Bedford was one of 10 Monmouth-class armoured cruisers built for the Royal Navy in the first decade of the 20th century. She was assigned to the 1st Cruiser Squadron of the Channel Fleet upon completion in 1903 before she was briefly reduced to reserve in 1906. Bedford was recommissioned the following year for service with China Station and ran aground in 1910. Her wreck was sold for scrap later that year after being partially salvaged.

== Design and description ==
The Monmouths were intended to protect British merchant shipping from fast cruisers like the French Guichen, Châteaurenault or the Dupleix class. The ships were designed to displace 9,800 long tons (10,000 t). They had an overall length of 463 feet 6 inches (141.3 m), a beam of 66 feet (20.1 m) and a deep draught of 25 feet (7.6 m). They were powered by two 4-cylinder triple-expansion steam engines, each driving one shaft using steam provided by 31 Belleville boilers. The engines produced a total of 22,000 indicated horsepower (16,000 kW) which was designed to give the ships a maximum speed of 23 knots (43 km/h; 26 mph). The ships carried a maximum of 1,600 long tons (1,600 t) of coal and her complement consisted of 678 officers and ratings.

The Monmouth-class ships' main armament consisted of fourteen breech-loading (BL) 6-inch (152 mm) Mk VII guns. Four of these guns were mounted in two twin-gun turrets, one each fore and aft of the superstructure, and the others were positioned in casemates amidships. Six of these were mounted on the main deck and were only usable in calm weather. Ten quick-firing (QF) 12-pounder (3-inch (76 mm)) 12-cwt guns (Note: "Cwt" is the abbreviation for hundredweight, 12 cwt referring to the weight of the gun.) were fitted for defence against torpedo boats. Bedford also carried three 3-pounder 1.9 in (47 mm) Hotchkiss guns and two submerged 18-inch (450 mm) torpedo tubes.

The ship's waterline armour belt was four inches (102 mm) thick amidships and two-inch (51 mm) forward. The armour of the gun turrets, their barbettes and the casemates was four inches thick. The protective deck armour ranged in thickness from 0.75–2 inches (19–51 mm) and the conning tower was protected by ten inches (254 mm) of armour.

== Construction and service ==
Bedford, named after the English county, was laid down on 19 February 1900 by Fairfield Shipbuilding & Engineering at their Govan shipyard. She was launched on 31 August 1901, when she was christened by Charlotte Mary Emily Burns, wife of the Hon. James Cleland Burns, of the Cunard Line shipping family. In May 1902 she was navigated to Devonport for completion and trials. The ship was completed on 11 November 1903 and initially assigned to the 1st Cruiser Squadron of the Channel Fleet. Bedford was briefly placed in reserve at the Nore in 1906 before being recommissioned in February 1907 for service on the China Station.

On 20 August 1910, four armoured cruisers of the China Station, under the command of Vice-Admiral Alfred Winsloe aboard HMS Minotaur, departed Wei-Hai-Wei, bound for Nagasaki, Japan. Winsloe ordered his ships to conduct machinery trials en route, initially at full power before reducing to three-fifths power. As the ships rounded the tip of the Shandong Peninsula and entered the Yellow Sea heading southeast, Bedford was leading the cruisers by at least 5 nautical miles (9.3 km; 5.8 mi) and each ship was navigating independently. The weather was misty and rainy with Force 3–5 head winds; there was a full moon with a spring tide. One of the other cruisers, Kent, checked her navigation when she spotted Ross Island at 05:00 the following morning and found that she was 11 nautical miles (20 km; 13 mi) north and 1 nautical mile (1.9 km; 1.2 mi) east of her estimated position. Heavy cloud cover had prevented all four ships from using celestial navigation to fix their position with any certainty; Kent was the only one that spotted a landmark clearly enough to determine her position.

Bedford got a partial star observation at 04:15, but the bridge crew was distracted by spotting land off the port side just seven minutes later and did not make the calculations until later. The navigator was called to the bridge and he assumed that it was Loney Bluff on the southwest side of Quelpart Island in the East China Sea. There was nothing else visible eastwards and the position was within 3 nmi (5.6 km; 3.5 mi) of the ship's estimated position. The stellar observation was finally worked out by 04:35 and it gave a position some 30 nmi (56 km; 35 mi) north of the dead reckoning position, although it could not be confirmed. At 04:40 land was sighted ahead of the ship and the navigator ordered a turn to starboard to reverse course at 04:47. About 10 seconds after starting the turn a rock was spotted off the starboard bow and he attempted to reverse his turn, but Bedford ran aground on Samarang Reef, some 24.7 nmi (45.7 km; 28.4 mi) north and 8 nmi (15 km; 9.2 mi) west of her estimated position.

The impact sprung seams between plates on the starboard side of the bow, ripped a hole some 30 by 20 feet (9.1 by 6.1 m) that flooded the forward boiler room, killing 18 of the 19 crewmen on duty there, and tore another 6 by 4 feet (1.8 by 1.2 m) hole in the side of the boiler room. Minotaur was some 6 nmi (11 km; 6.9 mi) behind Bedford and was able to read signals from her by 04:55. Winsloe ordered Kent to continue on to Nagasaki to act as a radio relay as he requested assistance from the Japanese Ministry of the Navy under the terms of the Anglo-Japanese Alliance. Salvage ships were sent the following morning, but had to put back into port because of bad weather. In the meantime, Winsloe inspected the ship and decided to take her crew off in light of the deteriorating weather. Minotaur and the cruiser Monmouth put men aboard on the morning of the 22nd to see what could be salvaged, but they were withdrawn by noon as the weather continued to worsen and Kent radioed news of a typhoon en route. Winsloe boarded Bedford again on the morning of the 23rd and found her partially flooded and with waves breaking over her quarterdeck. As the weather began to improve he ordered that her upper deck guns and their equipment be salvaged, despite the waist-deep water. The sailors were able recover nine 12-pounder guns, the ship's radio, searchlights and gunsights that day.

The Japanese salvage ships arrived on 24 August and began removing more equipment and guns and a Royal Navy naval architect arrived two days later to assess the possibility of refloating Bedford. He concluded that it was possible if the good weather continued, but it would be very expensive and did not recommend doing so. Winsloe decided to continue salvaging equipment from the wreck, although the Japanese returned home on the 27th, but was forced to abandon it on 31 August when another typhoon was approaching the wreck site. By this time the British and Japanese had salvaged 14 six-inch guns, 13 torpedoes, and much gunnery and fire-control equipment in addition to the items removed earlier. Winsloe contracted with Mitsubishi to salvage the wreck on 20 August, but they were only able to work seven days on it by 14 October. The wreck was later sold at auction in Hong Kong after the initial auction failed to meet the £5,000 reserve.

Bedford's captain, Captain Edward Fitzherbert and the navigator, Lieutenant Dixie, were subsequently court-martialled. Although Dixie had accounted for the head sea and wind in his dead reckoning, he failed to account for currents or tides, expecting them to cancel out. They were both found guilty of "suffering the ship to be stranded" and Dixie was found not guilty of the charge of negligence while Fitzherbert was found guilty. Both were sentenced to be "dismissed their ship" and severely reprimanded. Fitzherbert later retired as a vice-admiral while Dixie became an instructor in navigation.

== Bibliography ==
- Friedman, Norman (2012). British Cruisers of the Victorian Era. Barnsley, UK: Seaforth. ISBN 978-1-59114-068-9.
- Friedman, Norman (2011). Naval Weapons of World War One: Guns, Torpedoes, Mines and ASW Weapons of All Nations; An Illustrated Directory. Barnsley, UK: Seaforth Publishing. ISBN 978-1-84832-100-7.
- McBride, K. D. (1988). "The Wreck of HMS Bedford". Warship. 48 (October). London: Conway Maritime Press: 22–25. ISSN 0142-6222.
- McBride, Keith (1988). "The First County Class Cruisers of the Royal Navy, Part I: The Monmouths". Warship. 46 (April). London: Conway Maritime Press: 19–26. ISSN 0142-6222.
- Preston, Antony (1985). "Great Britain and Empire Forces". In Gray, Randal (ed.). Conway's All the World's Fighting Ships 1906–1921. Annapolis, Maryland: Naval Institute Press. pp. 1–104. ISBN 0-85177-245-5.
- Roberts, John (1979). "Great Britain and Empire Forces". In Chesneau, Roger & Kolesnik, Eugene M. (eds.). Conway's All the World's Fighting Ships 1860-1905. Greenwich, UK: Conway Maritime Press. pp. 1–113. ISBN 0-8317-0302-4.
- Silverstone, Paul H. (1984). Directory of the World's Capital Ships. New York: Hippocrene Books. ISBN 0-88254-979-0.
