= Francis Fitzherbert-Stafford, 12th Baron Stafford =

English peer and British Army officer

Lieutenant-Colonel The Right Honourable The Lord Stafford DSO
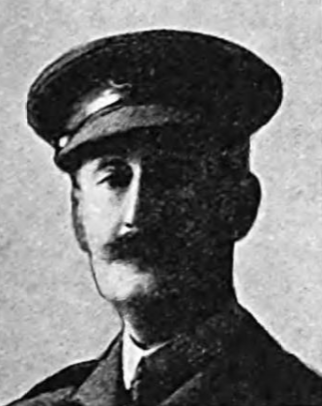
- Born: 28 August 1859; Swynnerton Park, Staffordshire
- Died: 18 September 1932 (aged 73)
- Education: Beaumont College
- Spouse: Dorothy Worthington (m. 1903)
- Military career
- Allegiance: United Kingdom
- Branch: British Army Militia
- Service years: 1887–1903
- Units: Lancashire Militia; Staffordshire Yeomanry
- Conflicts: Second Boer War
- Awards: Mentioned in dispatches

Francis Edward Fitzherbert-Stafford, 12th Baron Stafford, DSO (28 August 1859 – 18 September 1932) was an English peer and British Army officer, holding the title Baron Stafford. His lifetime marked the point where the Stafford barony first came into contact with Fitzherbert as a surname.

== Background ==
Francis Edward's father was Basil Thomas Fitzherbert and his mother was Emily Charlotte Stafford-Jerningham. It was through his mother's side of the family that he gained the Stafford barony; his uncle Fitzherbert Edward Stafford-Jerningham, 11th Baron Stafford had died without issue in 1913. Fitzherbert-Stafford also descended from Genoese nobility as his great grandfather was John Vincent Gandolfi, 12th Marquis Gandolfi. A Roman Catholic, he was educated at Beaumont College, Windsor.

== Military Career and Public Offices ==
Fitzherbert was commissioned in 1877 into the 1st Royal Lancashire Militia (The Duke of Lancaster's Own), which from 1881 became the 3rd (1st Royal Lancashire Militia) Battalion, King's Own Royal Regiment (Lancaster). He was promoted to major on 5 February 1900, and the following week left with the battalion to serve in the Second Boer War. He fought in South Africa from his arrival in March 1900 to 1902, and was awarded the Distinguished Service Order (DSO) in 1900. He became honorary lieutenant-colonel in 1901, and renounced his militia commission in 1903. He was also commissioned into his native county's Staffordshire Yeomanry in 1885, and promoted Major in that regiment in 1898.

In the First World War he served purely on home defence duties, becoming Colonel commanding the Staffordshire Volunteer Regiment of the Volunteer Training Corps.

He was a Deputy Lieutenant and Justice of the Peace for Staffordshire and hereditary Lord High Steward of the Borough of Stafford.

== Marriage and later life ==
On 20 April 1903 Fitzherbert-Stafford married Dorothy Hilda Worthington, the daughter of Albert Octavius Worthington. Together the two did not parent any children. He died at the family seat of Swynnerton Hall at age 73.

== Notes ==
Peerage of England
Preceded by Fitzherbert Edward Stafford-Jerningham	Baron Stafford; 1913–1932	Succeeded by Edward Fitzherbert
