= William Stafford-Howard, 2nd Earl of Stafford =

English peer

The Right Honourable The Earl of Stafford
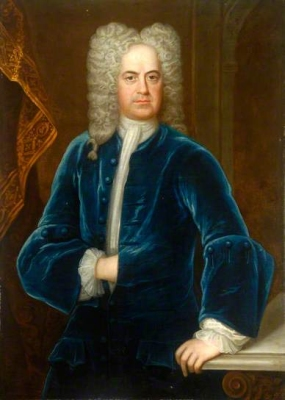
- Portrait of Lord Stafford, by Godfrey Kneller, 1730
- Born: William Stafford-Howard c. 1690
- Died: January 1733 (aged 42–43)
- Spouse: Anne Holman (m. 1718; died 1725)
- Children: William Stafford-Howard, 3rd Earl of Stafford; Mary, Countess de Rohan-Chabot; Lady Anastasia Stafford-Howard; Lady Anne Stafford-Howard
- Parent(s): John Stafford-Howard; Mary Southcote
- Relatives: William Howard, 1st Viscount Stafford (grandfather); Mary Howard, Countess of Stafford (grandmother)

William Stafford-Howard, 2nd Earl of Stafford, de jure 3rd Baron Stafford (c. 1690 – January 1733) was an English peer.

== Early life ==
Stafford-Howard was born in c. 1690 as the son of John Stafford-Howard (d. 1714) and Mary Southcote (a daughter of Sir John Southcote). Among his siblings was Mary Stafford-Howard (wife of Francis Plowden, MP for Bannow) and John Stafford-Howard, 4th Earl of Stafford, upon whose death the earldom became extinct. After his mother's death, his father married Theresa Strickland, daughter of Robert Strickland, in c. 1707. His father served as King James II's Ambassador to King Louis XIV when the former was exiled at Saint-Germain. After the King's death, his father served as vice-chamberlain to the King's widow, Queen Mary.

His paternal grandparents were William Howard, 1st Viscount Stafford, 1st Baron Stafford, and Mary Howard, Countess of Stafford (a granddaughter of the 4th Baron Stafford). His grandfather, the youngest son of Thomas Howard, 21st Earl of Arundel, was beatified as a Catholic martyr by Pope Pius XI in 1929.

== Career ==
On the death of his uncle, Henry Stafford-Howard, (Note: His uncle, Henry Stafford-Howard, 1st Earl of Stafford, had married Claude-Charlotte, daughter of Philibert de Gramont and his wife, Elizabeth, daughter of Sir George Hamilton, but died without issue.) on 27 April 1719, he succeeded as the 2nd Earl of Stafford. He also succeeded as the de jure 3rd Baron Stafford.

== Personal life ==
In c. 1718, he married his cousin, Anne Holman (d. 1725), daughter of George Holman and Anastasia Howard. Together, they were the parents of:

- William Matthias Stafford-Howard, 3rd Earl of Stafford (1719–1751), who married Henrietta Cantillon, daughter of economist Richard Cantillon and Mary Mahony (a daughter of wealthy merchant Count Daniel O'Mahony), in 1743. After his death, she married Robert Maxwell, 1st Earl of Farnham.
- Lady Mary Apollonia Scholastica Stafford-Howard (1721–1769), who married, as his second wife, Count Guy Auguste de Rohan-Chabot, son of Louis, Duke of Rohan, in 1744.
- Lady Anastasia Stafford-Howard (1722–1807), who became a nun with the Order of Immaculate Conception at Paris.
- Lady Anne Stafford-Howard (1725–1792), who also became a nun.

Lady Stafford died on 21 May 1725. Lord Stafford died in January 1733 and was succeeded in his titles by his only son, William.

Peerage of England
Preceded by Henry Stafford-Howard	Earl of Stafford; 1719–1725	Succeeded by William Matthias Stafford-Howard
