= Basil Fitzherbert, 14th Baron Stafford =

English soldier, landowner and peer

Basil Francis Nicholas Fitzherbert, 14th Baron Stafford (7 April 1926 – 8 January 1986) was an English soldier, landowner, and peer, a member of the House of Lords for almost forty years.

== Life ==
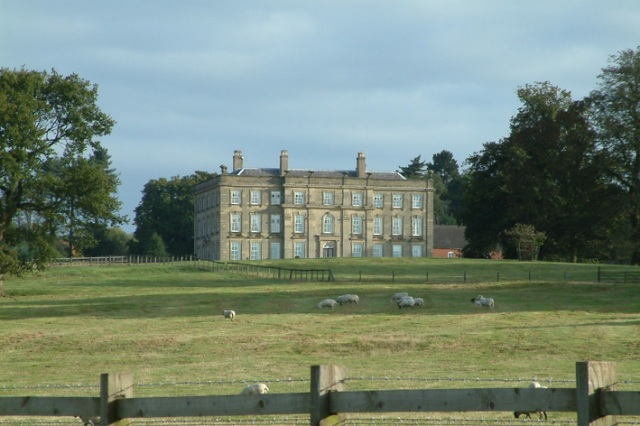
Swynnerton Hall

The son of Captain Thomas Charles Fitzherbert and Helen Beryl Frances Waters, the young Fitzherbert was educated at Ampleforth College and succeeded his uncle as Baron Stafford on 28 September 1941, while still at school. With the Second World War ongoing, he received officer training and was commissioned into the Scots Guards, and was a Lieutenant by 1944. After the war, he began to manage his estate, based at Swynnerton Hall, Stone, Staffordshire, in 1947 took his seat in the House of Lords, and then continued his education at St John's College, Cambridge. In 1951, he failed his First Public Examination in Agriculture for a second time, and his tutor noted “...his main failing being that he does not recognize the need to learn things”.

Stafford later became a local director of Barclays Bank.

== Private life ==
On 16 June 1952, Stafford married Morag Nada Campbell (1932-2024), a daughter of Lt.-Col. Alastair Campbell, and they had six children, Aileen Mary (1953), Francis Melfort William (1954), Thomas Alastair (1955), Caroline Fiona (1956), Wendy Helen (1961), and Philip Basil (1962). Lady Stafford died in 2024.

He was a member of the MCC and the Army and Navy Club. In 1961 he gave the site of Stafford Castle to the local authority for conservation.

On his death aged 59 in 1986, Stafford was succeeded in his estate and his seat in the House of Lords by his eldest son.

== Notes ==
Peerage of England
Preceded by Edward Stafford Fitzherbert	Baron Stafford; 1941–1986	Succeeded by Francis Melfort William Fitzherbert
