= Edward Fitzherbert, 13th Baron Stafford =

English peer and Royal Navy Admiral (1864–1941)

Admiral The Right Honourable The Lord Stafford KCB
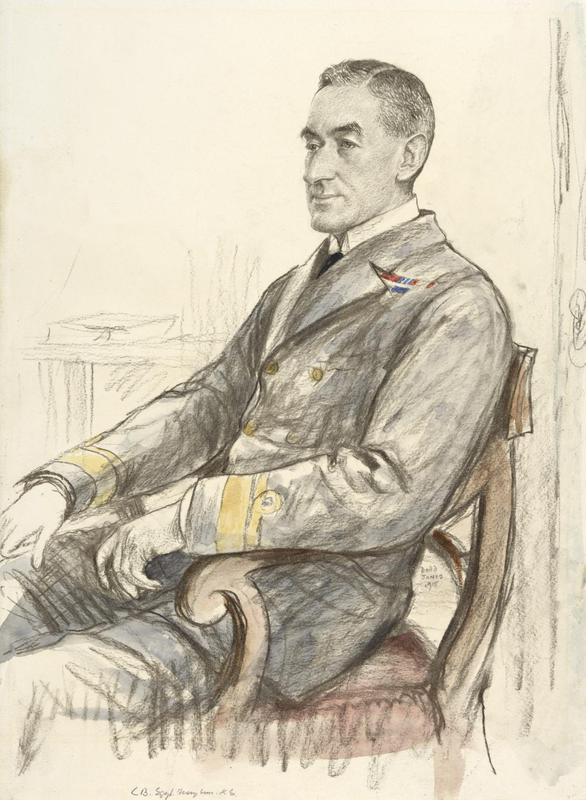
- 1918 portrait by Francis Dodd
- Born: 17 April 1864
- Died: 28 September 1941 (aged 77)
- Military career
- Allegiance: United Kingdom
- Branch: Royal Navy
- Service years: 1877–1925
- Rank: Admiral
- Commands: HMS Albemarle; HMS Impregnable, formerly Howe; HMS Bedford; Cape of Good Hope Station
- Conflicts: World War I
- Awards: Knight Commander of the Order of the Bath; Grand Officer of the Military Order of the Tower and Sword

Admiral Edward Stafford Fitzherbert, 13th Baron Stafford, KCB (17 April 1864 – 28 September 1941) was an English peer, holding the title Baron Stafford. He was also a Royal Navy officer who went on to be Commander-in-Chief, Cape of Good Hope Station.

== Naval career ==
Fitzherbert joined the Royal Navy in 1877. He was promoted to commander on 30 June 1899, and during the summer of 1902 was appointed in command of the protected cruiser HMS Cambrian, senior officer′s ship on the South East Coast of America Station. Promoted to captain in 1904, he was given command of the battleship HMS Albemarle, of the training ship HMS Impregnable and then of the armoured cruiser HMS Bedford which ran aground in 1910, leading him to be found guilty of negligence.

He served in World War I as Director of Mines and Torpedoes from October 1915 and saw the introduction of the highly successful Coastal Motor Boat craft and the variant of this, the first unmanned Radio Controlled naval vessels, the Distant Control Boats. He was Commander-in-Chief, Cape of Good Hope Station from May 1918. He became a full Admiral on retirement in 1925.

On 14 June 1919, he was made a Grand Officer of the Order of the Tower and Sword by the Portuguese President João do Canto e Castro.

== Family ==
His father was Basil Thomas Fitzherbert and his mother was Emily Charlotte Stafford-Jerningham. He changed his surname to Fitzherbert-Stafford by Royal Licence. It was through his mother's side of the family that he gained the Stafford barony in 1932; his brother Francis Fitzherbert-Stafford, 12th Baron Stafford had died without issue that year. Fitzherbert-Stafford also descended from Genoese nobility as his great grandfather was John Vincent Gandolfi, 12th Marquis Gandolfi.

The barony thus passed on to his nephew, Basil Fitzherbert, 14th Baron Stafford. The 13th Baron Stafford died at the family seat of Swynnerton Hall in 1941 at age 77.

Military offices
Preceded by Sir Edward Charlton	Commander-in-Chief, Cape of Good Hope Station; 1918–1920	Succeeded by Sir William Goodenough
Peerage of England
Preceded by Francis Fitzherbert-Stafford	Baron Stafford; 1932–1941	Succeeded by Basil Fitzherbert
