= Baron Stafford =

English baronial title

Barony of Stafford
- Arms of Fitzherbert, Barons Stafford since 1913: Argent, a chief vairy or and gules overall a bend sable
- Creation date: 12 September 1640 (Fifth creation)
- Creation: Fifth
- Created by: Charles I (fifth creation)
- Peerage: Peerage of England
- First holder: Edmund de Stafford, 1st Baron Stafford (First creation)
- Present holder: Francis Fitzherbert, 15th Baron Stafford
- Heir apparent: The Hon. Benjamin Fitzherbert
- Remainder to: Heirs male of the first baron and baroness's bodies lawfully begotten; failing that, to heirs general of their bodies
- Status: Extant
- Seat: Swynnerton Hall
- Motto: Ung je serviray ("One I will serve")

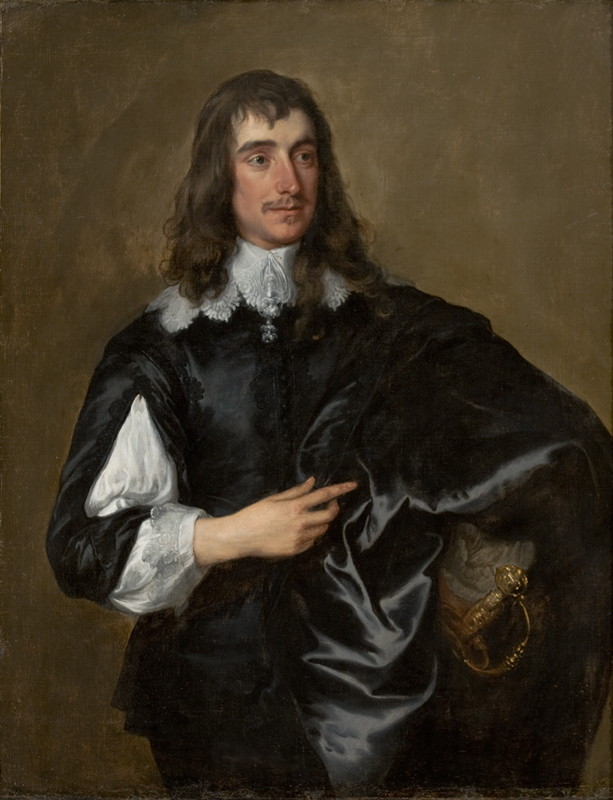
William Howard, 1st Viscount Stafford

Baron Stafford, referring to the town of Stafford, is a title that has been created several times in the Peerage of England. In the 14th century, the barons of the first creation were made earls. Those of the fifth creation, in the 17th century, became first viscounts and then earls. Since 1913, the title has been held by the Fitzherbert family.

== History of the title ==
The first creation was by writ in 1299 for Edmond de Stafford. His successor, the second baron, was made Earl of Stafford in 1351, and the sixth earl was made Duke of Buckingham in 1444. The sixth earl was the son of Anne of Gloucester, Countess of Buckingham, daughter of Thomas of Woodstock, Earl of Buckingham (later Duke of Gloucester), youngest son of King Edward III of England. Stafford was an important supporter of the House of Lancaster in the Wars of the Roses, and was killed at the Battle of Northampton in July 1460. The 1st Duke of Buckingham was succeeded in his titles by his grandson Henry, who aided Richard III in his claiming the throne in 1483 (Edward IV of England's marriage to Elizabeth Woodville having been declared null and void and Edward's sons illegitimate by Act of Parliament Titulus Regius), but who then led a revolt against Richard. He was executed for treason in 1483 and his titles were declared forfeit. His son Edward was restored as 3rd Duke upon Henry VII's accession to the throne in 1485, but he was ultimately executed in 1521 due to his opposition to Cardinal Thomas Wolsey, Henry VIII's chief advisor. When he was executed for treason, his titles were declared forfeit.

The second creation, again by writ, was for Richard Stafford, who was created Baron Stafford of Clifton. At the death of the fourth baron, that title fell into abeyance.

The third creation was in 1411 for Sir Hugh Stafford, a son of Hugh Stafford, 2nd Earl of Stafford; he had married Elizabeth Bourchier, 4th Baroness Bourchier (c. 1399 – 1433), only child and sole heiress of Bartholomew Bourchier, 3rd Baron Bourchier (d.1409). Hugh was summoned to Parliament in lieu of his wife, as Baron Stafford. At his death, this title became extinct since he left no heirs.

The fourth creation was in 1547 for Henry Stafford. In 1558, his title was recognized as carrying precedence from 1299, so he is in fact the 10th Baron.

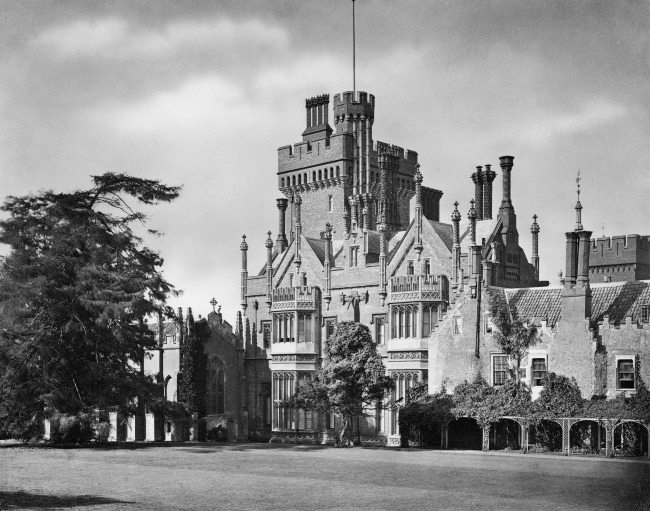
Costessey Hall c.1850. Now demolished, seat of the Jerningham family, Barons Stafford

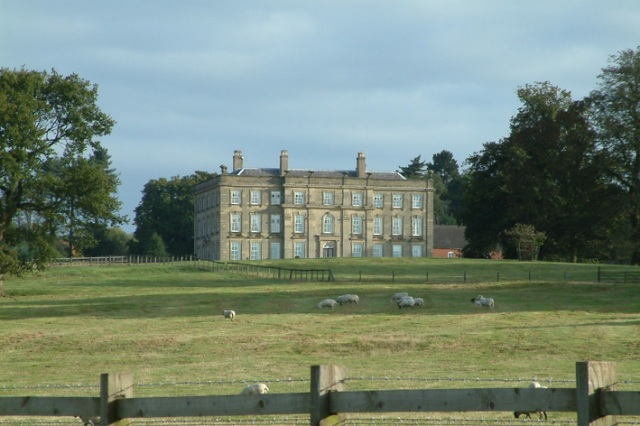
Swynnerton Hall, Staffordshire, seat of the Fitzherbert family, Barons Stafford

The fifth creation of the title came in 1640 in favour of William Howard. He was the third and youngest son of Thomas Howard, 21st Earl of Arundel, grandson of Thomas Howard, 4th Duke of Norfolk (see the Duke of Norfolk). He married Mary Stafford, only sister of Henry Stafford, 5th Baron de Stafford (of the 1547 creation, which is considered to have become extinct upon the death of Mary's uncle, the sixth Baron, sometime around 1640). On 12 September 1640 William Howard was created Baron Stafford, with remainder, in default of heirs male of the body, to the heirs of his body by his wife Mary and with the precedence of the 1547 barony. The same day Mary was made Baroness Stafford in her own right. This title was for life only. Two months later, on 11 November, William Howard was created Viscount Stafford, with remainder to his issue male.

Visscount Stafford later became implicated in the Titus Oates plot, where fabricated evidence was used to prove an alleged Catholic plot against Charles II. He was attainted in 1678, with his titles forfeited. In 1680, he was impeached by the House of Commons and executed. After the accession of the Catholic James II, Mary, Baroness Stafford, was created Countess of Stafford for life in 1688. On the same day, her eldest son by Lord Stafford, Henry Stafford-Howard, was created Earl of Stafford, with remainder to his brothers John and Francis. However, he was not allowed to succeed in the barony or viscountcy of Stafford as these titles were still under attainder.

Henry was succeeded according to the special remainder by his nephew, the second Earl (the eldest son of John). He was succeeded by his son, the third Earl. When he died childless, the title passed to his uncle, the fourth Earl. He was also childless and on his death in 1762 the earldom became extinct (the viscountcy of Stafford also formally became extinct, although the title was then under attainder). The claim to the barony of Stafford passed to the late Earl's niece, Anastasia, the de jure sixth Baroness Stafford. She was the daughter of the second Earl of Stafford. However, Anastasia was childless and on her death in 1807 the claim passed to her first cousin once removed, Sir William Jerningham, 6th Baronet, of Cossey (see Jerningham Baronets for earlier history of this title). He was the son of Sir George Jerningham, 5th Baronet, and his wife Mary, Lady Jerningham, only daughter of Mary Plowden, sister of the fourth Earl of Stafford.

Jerningham died in 1809, when the claim passed to his son Sir George William Jerningham, 7th Baronet. He petitioned the House of Lords for a reversal of the attainder and for a writ of summons of Parliament. In 1824 the attainder of the first Baron was completely reversed, and on 6 July 1825, the House of Lords decided that Jerningham had been successful in his claim to the barony. He was summoned to Parliament the same year as the eighth Baron Stafford. In 1826 he assumed by Royal licence the additional surname and arms of Stafford. He was succeeded by his eldest son, the ninth Baron. He had earlier represented Pontefract in the House of Commons. When he died the titles passed to his nephew, the tenth Baron, and then to the latter's brother, the eleventh Baron. On the eleventh Baron's death in 1913 the barony and baronetcy separated. The baronetcy was passed on to Sir Henry William Stafford Jerningham, 11th Baronet (on whose death in 1935 the title became extinct; see Jerningham Baronets).

The barony, which could be inherited through female lines, was passed on to the late Baron's nephew Francis Edward Fitzherbert, the twelfth Baron. He was the son of Emily Charlotte (sister of both the tenth and eleventh Baron) and her husband, Basil Thomas Fitzherbert. He assumed in 1913 by Royal licence the additional surname and arms of Stafford. He was succeeded by his younger brother, the thirteenth Baron. He was an admiral in the Royal Navy. On his death, the title passed to his nephew, the fourteenth Baron. As of 2010, the barony is held by the latter's son, the fifteenth Baron, who succeeded his father in 1986.

The seat of the Jerningham family, who held the title from 1825 to 1913, was Costessey Hall in Norfolk (demolished in 1925). The seat of the Fitzherbert family is Swynnerton Hall in Swynnerton, near Stone, Staffordshire.

Not to be confused with the title of Marquess of Stafford (created in 1786 in the Peerage of Great Britain), since 1833 the courtesy title for the heir of the Duke of Sutherland.

== List of Titleholders ==
=== Barons Stafford, first creation (1299) ===
Arms of Stafford: Or, a chevron gules

- Edmund de Stafford, 1st Baron Stafford (d. 1308)
- Ralph Stafford, 2nd Baron Stafford (1301–1372), created Earl of Stafford in 1351

==== Earls of Stafford (1351) ====
- Ralph Stafford, 1st Earl of Stafford, 2nd Baron Stafford (1301–1372), a notable soldier in the Hundred Years' War
- Hugh Stafford, 2nd Earl of Stafford, 3rd Baron Stafford (c. 1342–1386), eldest son of the 1st Earl
- Thomas Stafford, 3rd Earl of Stafford, 4th Baron Stafford (c. 1368–1392), second son of the 2nd Earl
- William Stafford, 4th Earl of Stafford, 5th Baron Stafford (1375–1395), third son of the 2nd Earl
- Edmund Stafford, 5th Earl of Stafford, 6th Baron Stafford (1378–1403), fourth son of the 2nd Earl
- Humphrey Stafford, 6th Earl of Stafford, 7th Baron Stafford (1402–1460), eldest son of the 5th Earl, created Duke of Buckingham in 1444

==== Dukes of Buckingham (1444) ====
- Humphrey Stafford, 1st Duke of Buckingham, 6th Earl of Stafford, 7th Baron Stafford (1402–1460), eldest son of the 5th Earl, created Duke of Buckingham in 1444
- Henry Stafford, 2nd Duke of Buckingham, 7th Earl of Stafford, 8th Baron Stafford (1455–1483), grandson of the 1st Duke
- Titles forfeit 1483
- Titles restored 1485
- Edward Stafford, 3rd Duke of Buckingham, 8th Earl of Stafford, 9th Baron Stafford (1477–1521), eldest son of the 2nd Duke
- Titles forfeit 1521

=== Barons Stafford of Clifton, second creation (1371) ===
A second barony of Stafford, with the modifier "of Clifton", was created by writ of summons on 8 January 1371: Richard Stafford (d. 1380), the younger son of Edmund de Stafford, 1st Baron Stafford, married Maud de Camville, daughter and heir of Richard de Camville of Clifton. Richard fought in the French wars of Edward III and was also appointed seneschal of Gascony. Their son, also Richard, was summoned to Parliament by Edward III and regularly participated through to 1379. He was appointed 1st Baron Stafford of Clifton. The barony then passed through:

- Edmund Stafford, 2nd Baron Stafford of Clifton (d. 1419), Richard's son. Edmund was also the Bishop of Exeter and named Keeper of the Privy Seal, 1396–1399 and again 1401–1403.
- Thomas Stafford, 3rd Baron Stafford of Clifton (d. 1425), the second son of Richard's. Was succeeded by his son.
- Thomas Stafford, 4th Baron Stafford of Clifton (d. 1445). He died issueless, leaving the Barony in abeyance. His heir was his sister, Katherine Stafford, who married Sir John Arden, Knt. Their daughter, Maud Arden, married Sir Thomas Stanley, and the barony is still invested in that line.

=== Barons Stafford, third creation (1411) ===
- Hugh Stafford, 1st Baron Stafford (d. 1420) Extinct on his death

=== Barons Stafford, fourth creation (1547) ===
- Henry Stafford, 1st Baron Stafford (1501–1563). In 1558, his title was recognized as carrying precedence from 1299.
- Henry Stafford, 2nd Baron Stafford (d. 1566)
- Edward Stafford, 3rd Baron Stafford (1536–1603)
- Edward Stafford, 4th Baron Stafford (1572–1625)
- Henry Stafford, 5th Baron Stafford (1621–1637)
- Roger Stafford, 6th Baron Stafford (c. 1573–1640) Title surrendered due to poverty in 1637; line extinct in 1640

=== Barons Stafford, fifth creation (1640) and Viscount Stafford (1640) ===
Arms of the house of Stafford Howard, Earls of Stafford

- William Howard, 1st Viscount Stafford, 1st Baron Stafford (1614–1680), second surviving son of Thomas Howard, 14th Earl of Arundel; peerage created jointly with wife (attainted 7 December 1680);
- Mary Howard, 1st Baroness Stafford (1619–1694), sister of Henry Stafford, 5th Baron Stafford and wife of William Howard, 1st Viscount Stafford, 1st Baron Stafford; peerage created jointly with husband; created Countess of Stafford for life in 1688.

==== Earls of Stafford (1688) ====
- Mary Howard, Countess of Stafford (life peerage)
- Henry Stafford-Howard, 1st Earl of Stafford, de jure 2nd Baron Stafford (c. 1648–1719). Married Claude-Charlotte, daughter of Philibert, Count de Gramont and Elizabeth, daughter of Sir George Hamilton. Died without issue and was succeeded by his nephew William, the son of his brother John. His widow survived him by 20 years.
- William Stafford-Howard, 2nd Earl of Stafford, de jure 3rd Baron Stafford (c. 1690–1734). Married his first cousin Anne, daughter of Anastasia Stafford and George Holman. They had 4 children, William-Matthias, Mary (married French Count Guy Auguste de Rohan-Chabot), Anastasia and Anne.
- William Matthias Stafford-Howard, 3rd Earl of Stafford, de jure 4th Baron Stafford (1718–1751) Married Henrietta, daughter of Richard Cantillon and left only female issue. He was succeeded by his uncle.
- John Paul Stafford-Howard, 4th Earl of Stafford, de jure 5th Baron Stafford, (1700–1762) (younger brother of William). Married Elizabeth Ewan and died without issue. The Earldom became extinct.

==== Baron Stafford (1640; reverted) ====
- Anastasia Stafford-Howard (1722–1807) (assumed the title Baroness Stafford upon the death of her uncle, John, as senior heir general of William Howard, 1st Viscount Stafford and his wife Mary Howard, Countess of Stafford

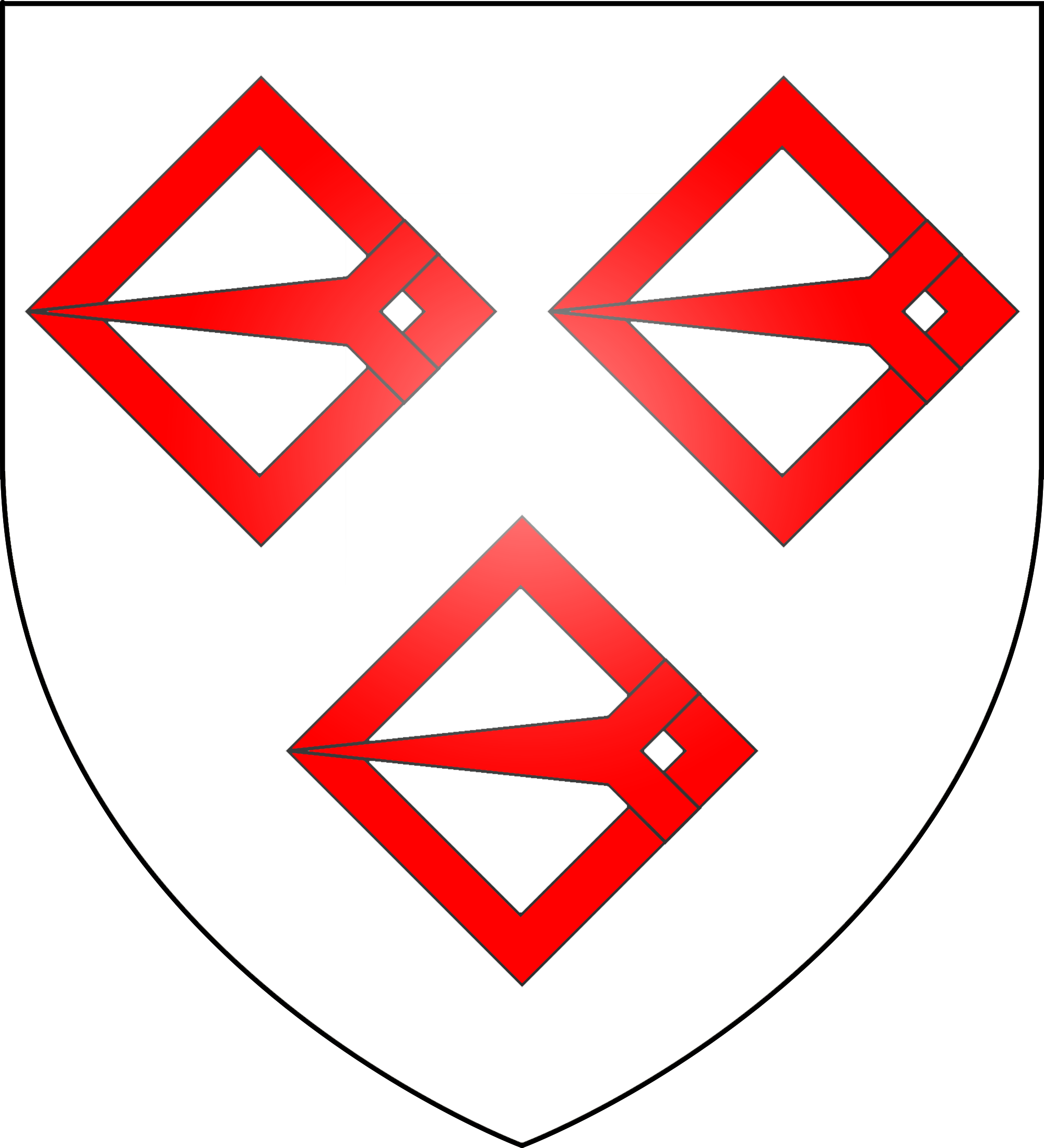
Arms of Jerningham: Argent, three buckles lozengy gules

- Sir William Jerningham, 6th Baronet (1736–1809), de jure 7th Baron Stafford (first cousin once removed);
- George William Stafford-Jerningham, 8th Baron Stafford (1771–1851) (son, who succeeded in having the 1680 attainder reversed in 1824). George was the great-grandson of Mary Stafford, sister of John Paul and daughter of John (second son of William Howard, 1st Viscount Stafford) and the heir-general to the Stafford Barony, and the four-times great-grandson of the 1st Baroness and Baron Stafford (1640 creation)
- Henry Valentine Stafford-Jerningham, 9th Baron Stafford (1802–1884)
- Augustus Frederick FitzHerbert Stafford-Jerningham, 10th Baron Stafford (1830–1892)
- Fitzherbert Edward Stafford-Jerningham, 11th Baron Stafford (1833–1913)
- Francis Edward Fitzherbert-Stafford, 12th Baron Stafford (1859–1932)
- Edward Stafford Fitzherbert, 13th Baron Stafford (1864–1941)
- Basil Francis Nicholas Fitzherbert, 14th Baron Stafford (1926–1986)
- Francis Melfort William Fitzherbert, 15th Baron Stafford (b. 1954)

The heir apparent is the present holder's elder son, the Hon. Benjamin John Basil Fitzherbert (b. 1983).

== Family tree of the Barons Stafford ==
Stafford family tree: Dukes of Buckingham, 1st creation

Feudal barony of Stafford
Nicholas de Stafford d. 1287
Baron Audley (2nd creation), 1317; Earl of Gloucester (3rd creation), 1337	Baron Stafford (1st creation), 1299
Hugh de Audley c. 1291–1347; Earl of Gloucester, 1st Baron Audley	Edmund de Stafford; 1272/1273–1308; 1st Baron Stafford
Earldom of Gloucester (3rd creation), extinct 1347
Earl of Stafford (1st creation), 1350	Baron Stafford (2nd creation) of Clifton, 1371
Margaret de Audley; 1318–1349 suo jure 2nd Baroness Audley	Ralph de Stafford; 1301–1372; 1st Earl of Stafford, 2nd Baron Stafford	Richard Stafford d. 1380; Baron Stafford of Clifton
Ralph de Stafford d. 1347	Hugh de Stafford; 1342–1386; 2nd Earl of Stafford, 3rd Baron Stafford, 3rd Baron Audley	Edmund Stafford; 1344–1419; 2nd Baron Stafford of Clifton	Thomas Stafford d. 1425; 3rd Baron Stafford of Clifton
Margaret de Stafford c. 1364–1396; Baroness Neville de Raby	Ralph Stafford c. 1367–1385	William Stafford; 1375–1395; 4th Earl of Stafford, 5th Baron Stafford	Katherine Stafford c. 1376–1419	Joan Stafford; 1378–1442; Duchess of Surrey	Thomas Stafford d. 1445; 4th Baron Stafford of Clifton
Baron Stafford (3rd creation), 1411	Barony Stafford (2nd creation) of Clifton in abeyance, 1445
Thomas Stafford c. 1368–1392; 3rd Earl of Stafford, 4th Baron Stafford	Anne of Gloucester; 1383–1438	Edmund Stafford; 1377–1403; 5th Earl of Stafford, 6th Baron Stafford	Hugh Stafford c. 1382–1420; 4th Baron Bourchier jure uxoris 1st Baron Stafford
Duke of Buckingham (first creation), 1444
Humphrey Stafford c. 1368–1392; 1st Duke of Buckingham, 6th Earl of Stafford, 7th Baron Stafford
Humphrey Stafford c. 1425–1458 styled Earl of Stafford
Edward IV; 1442–1483	Elizabeth Woodville c. 1437–1492	Jasper Tudor	Katherine Woodville c. 1458–1497	Henry Stafford; 1455–1483; 2nd Duke of Buckingham, 7th Earl of Stafford, 8th Baron Stafford
Dukedom of Buckingham and subsidiary titles forfeit, 1483
Dukedom of Buckingham and subsidiary titles restored, 1485
Edward Stafford; 1478–1521; 3rd Duke of Buckingham, 8th Earl of Stafford, 9th Baron Stafford
Dukedom of Buckingham and subsidiary titles forfeit, 1521 and posthumously attained, 1523
Baron Stafford (4th creation), 1547; Recognized as carrying precedence from 1st creation, 1558
Henry Stafford; 1501–1563 (styled Earl of Stafford until 1523), 1st Baron Stafford
Henry Stafford d. 1566; 2nd Baron Stafford	Edward Stafford; 1535–1603; 3rd Baron Stafford	Richard Stafford
Edward Stafford; 1572–1625; 4th Baron Stafford	Roger Stafford c. 1572–1640; 6th Baron Stafford
Barony Stafford (4th creation) surrendered due to poverty, 1639
Edward Stafford; 1602–1621
Viscount Stafford and Baron Stafford (5th joint creation), 1640	Baron Stafford (5th joint creation), 1640; Countess of Stafford for life, 1688
William Howard; 1614–1680; 1st Viscount Stafford and Baron Stafford	Mary Howard; 1619–1693; Countess of Stafford for life and suo jure 1st Baroness Stafford	Edward Stafford; 1621–1637; 5th Baron Stafford
All titles attainted, 1680	All titles attainted, 1680
Earl of Stafford (2nd creation), 1688; Baron Stafford de jure, 1693
Henry Stafford-Howard c. 1648–1719; 1st Earl of Stafford, 2nd Baron Stafford de jure	Anastasia Stafford-Howard	John Stafford-Howard d. 1714
Anne Holman d. 1725	William Stafford-Howard c. 1690–1734; 2nd Earl of Stafford, 3rd Baron Stafford de jure	Mary Stafford-Howard d. 1765	John Paul Stafford-Howard; 1700–1762; 4th Earl of Stafford, 5th Baron Stafford de jure
Jerningham baronets	Earldom extinct, 1762
William Matthias Stafford-Howard; 1719–1751; 3rd Earl of Stafford, 4th Baron Stafford de jure	Anastasia Stafford; 1722–1807; 6th Baroness Stafford	Marie "Mary" Françoise Plowden; 1704–c. 1785	George Jerningham; 1680–1774; 5th Baronet Jerningham of Cossey
William Jerningham; 1736–1809; 7th Baron Stafford de jure, 6th Baronet Jerningham of Cossey
Attainder reversed, 1824
George William Stafford-Jerningham; 1771–1851; 8th Baron Stafford, 7th Baronet Jerningham of Cossey	William Charles Jerningham; 1772–1820
Henry Valentine Stafford-Jerningham; 1802–1884; 9th Baron Stafford, 8th Baronet Jerningham of Cossey	Edward Stafford-Jerningham; 1804–1849	Frederick William Jerningham; 1813–1870
Augustus Frederick Fitzherbert Stafford-Jerningham; 1830–1892; 10th Baron Stafford, 9th Baronet Jerningham of Cossey	Fitzherbert Stafford-Jerningham; 1833–1913; 11th Baron Stafford, 10th Baronet Jerningham of Cossey	Emily Charlotte Stafford-Jerningham; 1835–1881	Adolphus Fredeick James Jerningham; 1842–1904
Francis Edward Fitzherbert-Stafford; 1859–1932; 12th Baron Stafford	Edward Stafford Fitzherbert; 1864–1941; 13th Baron Stafford	Thomas Charles Fitzherbert; 1869–1937	William Henry Stafford Jerningham; 1867–1935; 11th Baronet Jerningham of Cossey
Baronetcy Jerningham of Cossey extinct, 1935
Basil Francis Nicholas Fitzherbert; 1926–1986; 14th Baron Stafford
Francis Melfort William Fitzherbert b. 1954; 15th Baron Stafford
Benjamin John Basil Fitzherbert b. 1983; Heir apparent to the Stafford Barony

== See also ==
- Duke of Buckingham (1444 creation)
- Duke of Norfolk
- Duke of Sutherland (as Marquess of Stafford)
- Earl of Arundel
- Earl of Wiltshire
- Earl of Devon
- Baron Stafford of Southwick
- Jerningham Baronets
