= Francis Fitzherbert, 15th Baron Stafford =

English politician, educator, and landowner

Francis Melfort William Fitzherbert, 15th Baron Stafford DL (born 13 March 1954) is an English politician, educator and landowner, who had a seat in the House of Lords from 1986 until the reform of the House of Lords in 1999. He serves as the Chancellor of Staffordshire University and in a number of other roles.

== Biography ==
Stafford belongs to the Roman Catholic landed gentry family of Fitzherbert, whose most famous member was Maria Fitzherbert, the first (unrecognised) wife of King George IV. He was educated at Farleigh School, Ampleforth College, the University of Reading and the Royal Agricultural College, Cirencester.

Stafford is the eldest son of Basil Fitzherbert, 14th Baron Stafford, by his marriage to Morag Nada Campbell. On his father's death in 1986 he inherited the Barony of Stafford and the Swynnerton Park estate near Stone, Staffordshire. He lost his seat in the House of Lords under the House of Lords Act 1999. He was a director of Tarmac Industrial Products and has been a non-executive director of the Mid-Staffordshire Mental Health Foundation and a Governor of Harper Adams University since 1990. In 1993, he was Pro-Chancellor of Keele University. He was the High Sheriff of Staffordshire for 2005, making him the first peer to serve as a High Sheriff since 1371: while English peers all sat in the House of Lords they could not also serve the Crown as a High Sheriff.

He now serves as the Chancellor of Staffordshire University and has been a Deputy Lieutenant for the same county since 1993.

== Marriage and children ==
Stafford married Katherine Mary Codrington on 28 June 1980. They have two sons and two daughters:

- Hon Benjamin John Basil Fitzherbert (born 8 November 1983), heir apparent to the barony. He married Georgina Hewlett, a granddaughter of Thomas Clyde Hewlett, Baron Hewlett, on 10 December 2011.
- Hon Toby Francis Fitzherbert (born 27 March 1985)
- Hon Teresa Emily Fitzherbert (born 15 June 1987), married Andrew J. Byrne on 30 May 2015.
- Hon Camilla Rose Jane Fitzherbert (born 19 December 1989), engaged in 2018 to Harry M. M. Taylor.

Peerage of England
Preceded by Basil Fitzherbert	Baron Stafford; 1986–present	Incumbent
