= Henry Stafford-Howard, 1st Earl of Stafford =

British nobleman

Coat of arms of the Stafford-Howard family

Henry Stafford-Howard, 1st Earl of Stafford (né Howard; c. 1648 – 27 April 1719) was an English Jacobite.

== Early life ==
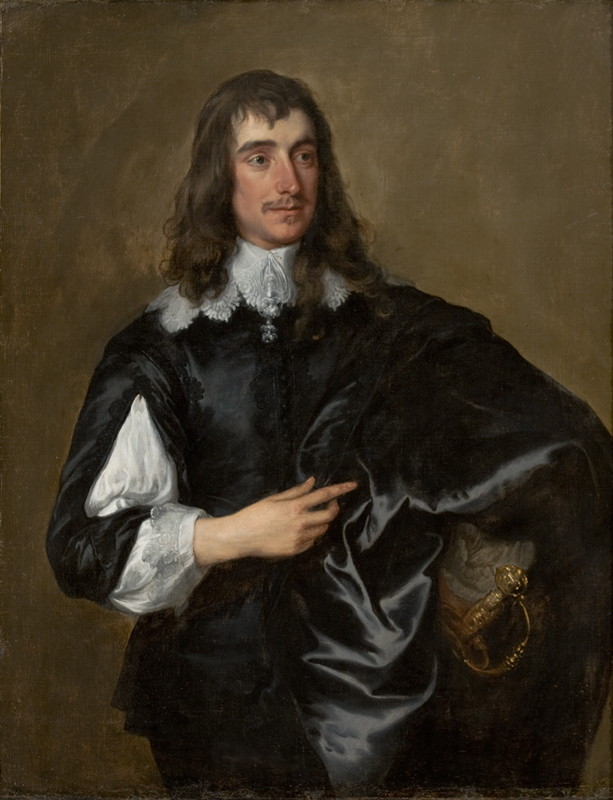
Portrait of his father, William, by Anthony van Dyck, c. 1638

Born as Henry Howard in c. 1648, he was the eldest son of William Howard, 1st Viscount Stafford (1614–1680) and Mary Howard, 1st Baroness Stafford. The Staffords were Catholics while the Howards were Protestants. Among his siblings were John Stafford-Howard (who served as James II's Ambassador to Louis XIV when the former was exiled at Saint-Germain), Francis Stafford-Howard (a Groom of the Bedchamber to James II), Isabella Stafford-Howard (third wife of the 5th Marquess of Winchester), and Anastasia Stafford-Howard (wife of George Holman). Three of his sisters, Ursula, Delphina, and Alethea became nuns.

His paternal grandparents were Thomas Howard, 14th Earl of Arundel, and Alethea Talbot, Baroness Talbot (youngest daughter of the 7th Earl of Shrewsbury and Mary Cavendish). His maternal grandparents were Hon. Edward Stafford (heir apparent to the barony of Stafford who predeceased his father, the 4th Baron Stafford) and Ann Wilford (a daughter of James Wilford, Newman Hall, Quendon, Essex).

== Career ==
His parents were both attainted on 7 December 1680 as Royalist supporters, before his father was falsely implicated by Titus Oates in the later discredited "Popish Plot". William was executed for treason on 29 December 1680. (Note: William Howard, 1st Viscount Stafford was beatified as a Catholic martyr by Pope Pius XI in 1929.)

In 1688, Stafford was a Colonel of Foot in 1688, the same year his name was legally changed to Henry Stafford-Howard. Upon the accession of James II, his mother had her titles restored and was created 1st Countess of Stafford, for life, on 5 October 1688 in the Peerage of England, as a consolation for the failure to reverse the attainder on his father. At the same time, Henry was created 1st Earl of Stafford, with a special remainder to his brothers and their male issue.

Following the Glorious Revolution, which saw the deposition of James II and VII in November 1688 to be replaced by his daughter Mary II and her Dutch husband, William III of Orange, Lord Stafford fled to France with James II and became a Jacobite, the political movement that supported the restoration of the senior line of the House of Stuart to the British throne.

== Personal life ==
Portrait of a Man (Self Portrait?), 25.5 × 19cm, 1433. National Gallery, London.

On 6 April 1694, he married the much younger Claude Charlotte de Gramont (c. 1665–1739) at Saint-Germain-en-Laye. She had served as lady-in-waiting (demoiselle d'honneur) to the Dauphine. the eldest daughter of Count Philibert de Gramont, who had served with Louis, Grand Condé, and Elizabeth Hamilton (a daughter of Sir George Hamilton). Reportedly, not long after their marriage, she "separated from him, and by 1700 was the object of his hatred".

Lord Stafford died without issue on 27 April 1719 and was succeeded, by special remainder, in his titles by his nephew, Henry Stafford-Howard. His widow, who lived until 1739, was acquainted with Lord Hervey, who described her as having "as much wit, humour, and entertainment as any may or woman he ever knew, with a great justness in her way of thinking, and very little reserve in her manner of giving her opinion of things and people."

=== Portrait of a Man in a Turban ===
Lord Stafford inherited the 1433 Portrait of a Man in a Turban by Jan van Eyck, which had been owned by his grandfather, the well known art collector Thomas Howard, 14th Earl of Arundel, in 1643. After Stafford's death, it was owned by Irish MP Thomas Brodrick and others before being acquired by the National Gallery in 1851.

Peerage of England
| Preceded by Mary Howard | Baron Stafford de jure 1693 – 1719 | Succeeded by Henry Stafford-Howard |
| New creation | Earl of Stafford; 1688 – 1719 | Succeeded by Henry Stafford-Howard |
