= Edward Stafford, 4th Baron Stafford =

English nobleman (1572–1625)

The Lord Stafford
- Born: 1572
- Died: 26 September 1625 (aged 52–53)
- Buried: Stafford Castle Church
- Noble family: Stafford
- Spouse: Isabel Forster
- Issue: Edward Stafford
- Father: Edward Stafford, 3rd Baron Stafford
- Mother: Mary Stanley

Edward Stafford, 4th Baron Stafford (1572 – 16 September 1625), was the son of Edward Stafford, 3rd Baron Stafford, and Mary Stanley, daughter of Edward Stanley, 3rd Earl of Derby, and Dorothy Howard. He became 4th Baron Stafford on the death of his father in 1603.

He married Isabel Forster, the daughter of Thomas Forster of Tong, Shropshire. Isabel was reported to be a family chambermaid in a letter to the Earl of Leicester which includes "My Lorde Stafford's son is basely married to his mother's chambermaid."

Edward Stafford continued on with his father's patronage of the Lord Stafford's Company, a travelling group of players, who were active until at least 1617.

== Death and succession ==
Stafford had one son, Edward (1602 – 6 April 1621). This son married Ann Wilford, daughter of James Wilford, Newman Hall, Quendon, Essex, and had two children:

1. Mary Howard, Countess of Stafford, who married Sir William Howard, younger son of Thomas, Earl of Arundel. Following her brother Henry Stafford's death, and the forced surrender of the barony, on the ground of his poverty, by the next heir, Mary's distant cousin Roger Stafford, 6th Baron Stafford in 1637, William and Mary were created Baron and Baroness Stafford on 12 September 1640. Two months later, William was created Viscount Stafford.
2. Henry Stafford, 5th Baron Stafford (24 September 1621 – 4 August 1637). Born after his father's death, he inherited the barony upon his grandfather the fourth baron's death in 1625.

Peerage of England
| Preceded by Edward Stafford | Baron Stafford; 1603–1625 | Succeeded by Henry Stafford |
