= Mary Howard, Countess of Stafford =

English suo jure peeress

Coat of arms of the Stafford-Howard family

Mary Howard, Countess of Stafford (née Stafford; 1619 – 13 January 1693) was an English suo jure peeress.

== Early life ==
She was the daughter of the Hon. Edward Stafford (d. 1621) and Ann Wilford (a daughter of James Wilford, Newman Hall, Quendon, Essex). Her father was heir apparent to the barony of Stafford, but died in 1621 before his father, Edward Stafford, 4th Baron Stafford. Therefore, upon her grandfather's death in 1625, her brother, Henry, became the 5th Baron Stafford.

Her paternal grandfather was the son of the 3rd Baron Stafford and Lady Mary Stanley (a daughter of the 3rd Earl of Derby). Her paternal grandmother, Isabel Forster, the daughter of Thomas Forster of Tong, Shropshire, was reported to be a family chambermaid in a letter to the Earl of Leicester which includes "My Lorde Stafford's son is basely married to his mother's chambermaid."

== Career ==
Following her brother's death in 1637, and the forced (and probably illegal) surrender of the barony, on the ground of his poverty, by the next heir, Mary's distant cousin Roger Stafford in 1637, the Howard family secured the title for William. Therefore, on 12 September 1640, Mary was created, suo jure 1st Baroness Stafford, jointly with her husband William as 1st Baron Stafford. Two months later, William was created Viscount Stafford. Mary and William were both attainted on 7 December 1680 as Royalist supporters, before being falsely implicated by Titus Oates in the later discredited "Popish Plot". William was executed for treason on 29 December 1680. (Note: William Howard, 1st Viscount Stafford was beatified as a Catholic martyr by Pope Pius XI in 1929.)

Mary had her titles restored with the accession of James II, and was created 1st Countess of Stafford, for life, on 5 October 1688 in the Peerage of England, as a consolation for the failure to reverse the attainder on her husband. At the same time, her eldest son, Henry, was created 1st Earl of Stafford, with a special remainder to his brothers and their male issue.

== Personal life ==
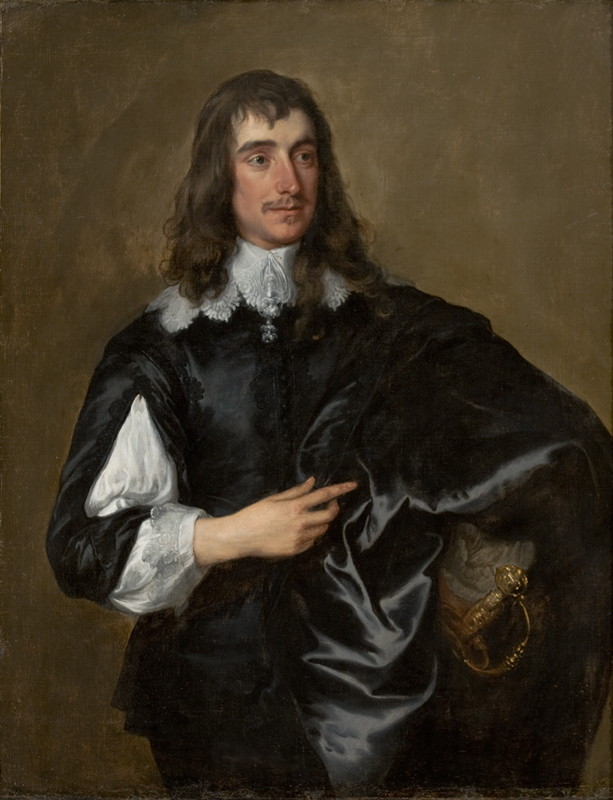
Portrait of her husband, William, by Anthony van Dyck, c. 1638

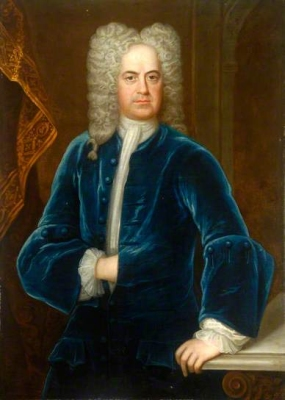
Portrait of her grandson, the 2nd Earl of Stafford, by Godfrey Kneller, 1730

By a licence granted 11 October 1637, she married William Howard (1614–1680). The Staffords were Catholics and the marriage was conducted by a Catholic, not an Anglican, priest, to the reported embarrassment of the groom's father. He was the second surviving son of Thomas Howard, 14th Earl of Arundel, and Alethea Talbot, Baroness Talbot (youngest daughter of the 7th Earl of Shrewsbury and his wife Mary Cavendish). Before his execution in 1680, they were the parents of three sons and six daughters, including:

- Henry Stafford-Howard, 1st Earl of Stafford (c. 1648–1719), who married Claude-Charlotte de Gramont, daughter of Philibert de Gramont and Elizabeth Hamilton (a daughter of Sir George Hamilton).
- John Stafford-Howard (c. 1660–1714), who served as James II's Ambassador to Louis XIV when the former was exiled at Saint-Germain; he married Mary Southcote, daughter of Sir John Southcote of Merstham. After her death, he married Theresa Strickland, a daughter of Robert Strickland.
- Francis Stafford-Howard (d. 1708), a Groom of the Bedchamber to James II; he married Eleanor Stafford, daughter of Henry Stafford.
- Ursula Stafford-Howard, who became a nun.
- Delphina Stafford-Howard, who became a nun at Leuven: she published her father's last letter to her, in which he wrote in moving terms of his innocence of the charges of treason brought against him.
- Alethea Stafford-Howard, who became a nun.
- Isabella Stafford-Howard (d. 1691), who married, as his third wife, John Paulet, 5th Marquess of Winchester, son of William Paulet, 4th Marquess of Winchester and Lady Lucy Cecil (a daughter of the 1st Earl of Exeter), in 1669, but had no issue.
- Anastasia Stafford-Howard (1646–1719), who married George Holman, of Warkworth, Northamptonshire, son of a wealthy London scrivener.

Lady Stafford died on 13 January 1693. Upon her death, her eldest son, Henry, succeeded as the de jure 2nd Baron Stafford (the attainder wasn't reversed until 1824 under George Stafford-Jerningham, 8th Baron Stafford).

=== Descendants ===
Through her second son John, she was a grandmother of William Stafford-Howard, 2nd Earl of Stafford and John Stafford-Howard, 4th Earl Stafford.

Through her youngest daughter Anastasia, she was a grandmother of Anne Holman, who married her cousin, William, 2nd Earl of Stafford.

Peerage of England
New creation	Baroness Stafford; 1640 – 1693	Succeeded by Henry Stafford-Howard de jure
New creation	Countess of Stafford; 1688 – 1693	Succeeded by Henry Stafford-Howard de jure
