= Swynnerton Hall =

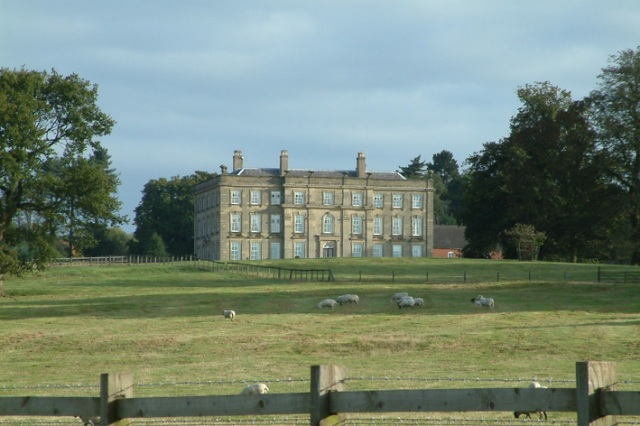
- Swynnerton Hall in 2003
- Interactive map of the Swynnerton Hall area

General information
- Type: Country house
- Architectural style: Georgian (hall)
- Location: Swynnerton, Staffordshire
- Current tenants: Barons Stafford
- Completed: 1720s
- Client: Thomas Fitzherbert
- Location within Staffordshire
- 52.9162°N 2.2214°W

Listed Building – Grade I
- Designated: 10 January 1953
- Reference no.: 1038991

Swynnerton Hall is an 18th-century country mansion house, the home of Lord Stafford, situated at Swynnerton near Stone, Staffordshire. It is a Grade I listed building.

== History ==
The manor of Swynnerton was owned by the eponymous family for several centuries before it came to the Fitzherberts when William Fitzherbert, third son of Sir Anthony Fitzherbert of Norbury Hall, married Elizabeth, daughter and co-heir of Humphrey Swynnerton, in 1562.

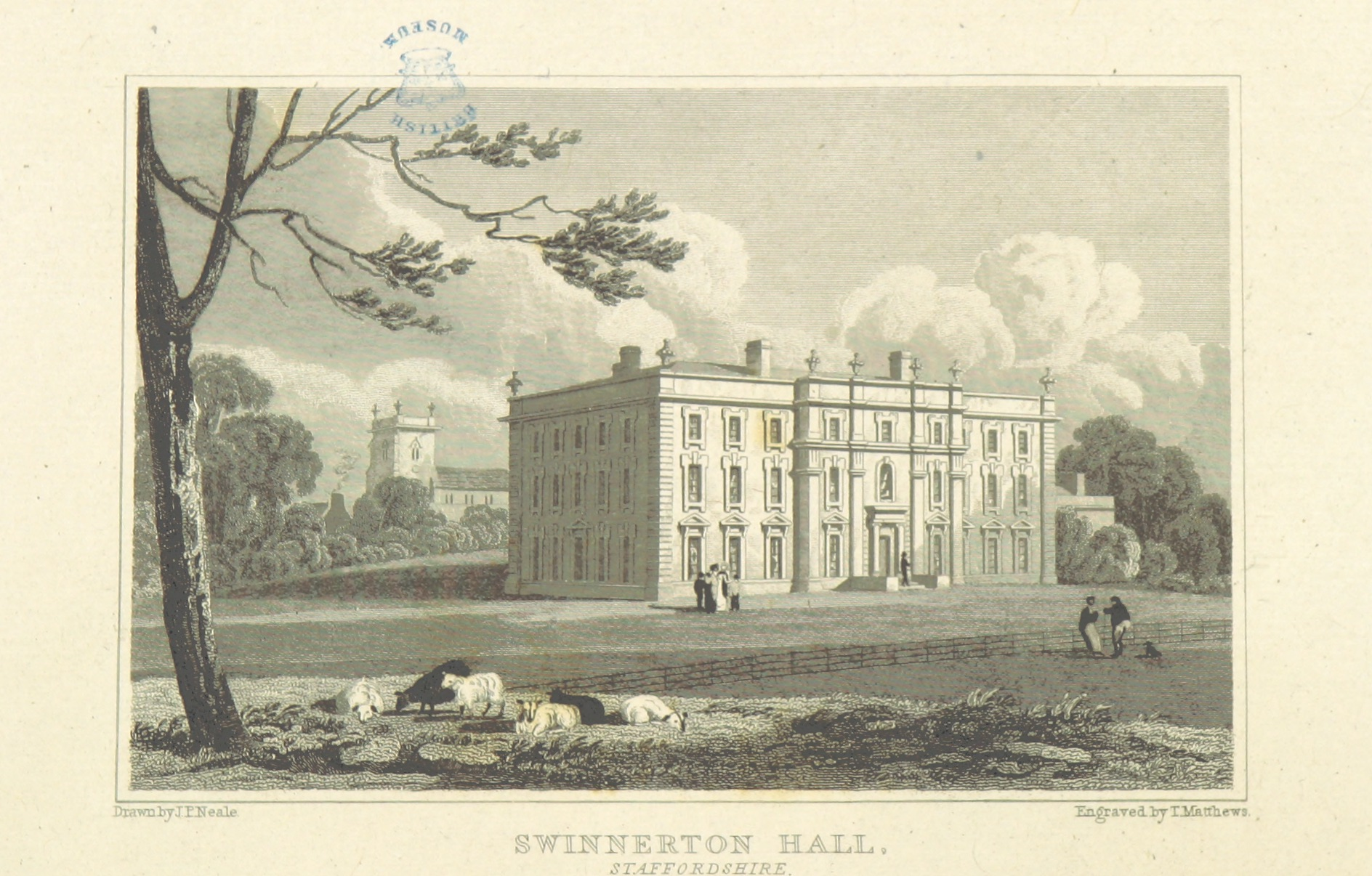
Swynnerton Hall in 1818

The Fitzherberts, a staunchly Catholic family, were Royalist sympathisers during the English Civil War and the house was irreparably damaged by the Parliamentarian forces.

The Norbury and Swynnerton estates were united when, in 1649, John Fitzherbert of Norbury bequeathed his estate to his cousin William Fitzherbert of Swynnerton. The manor was rebuilt in about 1729 to an impressive Georgian style design by architect Francis Smith of Warwick, consisting of three storeys and a nine-bayed frontage.

Following Catholic emancipation, a private family chapel was built adjacent to the Hall by Gilbert Blount around 1868. The chapel has Grade II* listed status and today serves as the parish church for the local Catholic community. Given the historical influence of the Fitzherbert family, the chapel is larger than is usually found in rural English locations.

Francis Fitzherbert inherited the title Baron Stafford on the death of his maternal uncle, Fitzherbert Stafford Jerningham of Costessey Hall, Norfolk in 1913. The estate has since been the seat of the barony.

In January 2013 the government announced plans to build the High Speed 2 railway and part of it would pass through the historic estate, with the railhead located at Stone. Francis Fitzherbert, 15th Baron Stafford, was among the first who opposed the plans, stating that the railway's path would irreparably damage the countryside and that the estate constitutes part of a designated conservation area.

A former High Sheriff of Staffordshire, Lord Stafford still resides at the Hall and farms the 3,000-acre (1,200 ha) estate.

== Estate and land ==
The park surrounding the hall was laid out by Capability Brown. The estate, known as Swynnerton Park, almost entirely encompasses the village of Swynnerton. The open landscape is used for agriculture, although parts of it were left untouched and open to the public as part of the promoted Hanchurch Hills Walks scenic trail.

== Notable residents ==
Thomas Fitzherbert of Swynnerton was a leading Jesuit of his day. Maria Fitzherbert, the mistress/secret wife of the future George IV, was the widow of a later Thomas Fitzherbert of Swynnerton.

== See also ==
- List of Grade I listed buildings in Staffordshire
- Listed buildings in Swynnerton
- List of family seats of English nobility
