= Roger Stafford, 6th Baron Stafford =

English noble (1572–1640)

The Lord Stafford
- Born: c. 1572; Malpas, Cheshire
- Died: 1640
- Noble family: Stafford
- Father: Richard Stafford
- Mother: Mary Corbet

Roger Stafford, 6th Baron Stafford, was the son of Richard Stafford, a younger son of Henry Stafford, 1st Baron Stafford, and Ursula Pole. He was forced to give up the Stafford barony in 1637 on the grounds of poverty.

Roger was born about 1572, the eldest child of Richard Stafford and Mary Corbet, daughter of John Corbet and Anne Booth. He had a younger sister Jane Stafford (b. abt 1581).

Roger was known by the name Floyde (or Fludd) as a youth, for reasons not recorded. He is thought to be the Floyde listed as a servant of George Corbet of Cowlesmore, Shropshire, his mother's brother, in a document owned by the Stafford family.

== Loss of the barony ==
Henry Stafford, 5th Baron Stafford, died without direct heirs. The barony was limited to the heirs male of the body of Henry Stafford, 1st Baron Stafford, and the next male heir was through the line of Richard, one of his other sons.

On the death of the 5th Baron, Roger petitioned Parliament for the title, at the age of sixty-five. A commission was appointed to examine his claim, headed by Henry Montagu, 1st Earl of Manchester. Eventually, the claim reached King Charles I who denied it on grounds of Stafford's poverty. The judgment read "that the said Roger Stafford, having no part of the inheritance of the said Lord Stafford, nor any other lands or means whatsoever…should make a resignation of all claims and title to the said Barony of Stafford, for his majesty to dispose of as he should see fit". He surrendered the title by deed on 7 December 1639 for a sum of £800. Such a surrender is now deemed to have been unlawful.

Roger died unmarried in 1640, the title line becoming extinct. The title of Baron Stafford was again created, by patent, on 12 September 1640 for Sir William Howard. Howard had married Mary Stafford, the sister of Henry Stafford, 5th Baron. Further documentation is needed to determine if Thomas Stafford, a miller who arrived in Plymouth, Massachusetts in 1626 and claimed to be the son of "Lord Stafford", is a continuation of the Stafford line.

Peerage of England
Preceded by Edward Stafford	Baron Stafford; 1637–1639	Surrendered
