= William Howard, 1st Viscount Stafford =

British nobleman and Roman Catholic martyr (1614–1680)

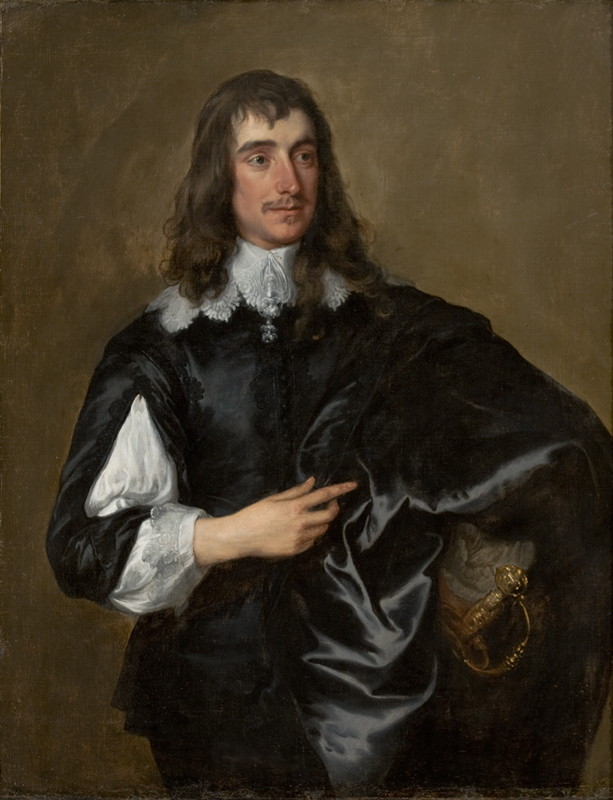
- Portrait by Anthony van Dyck.
- Born: 30 November 1614; Stafford
- Died: 29 December 1680 (aged 66); Tower Hill, London, England
- Noble family: Howard
- Spouse: Mary Stafford
- Father: Thomas Howard, 21st Earl of Arundel
- Mother: Alethea Talbot

William Howard, 1st Viscount Stafford, FRS (30 November 1614 – 29 December 1680) was the youngest son of Thomas Howard, 21st Earl of Arundel, and his wife, the former Alethea Talbot. A Fellow of the Royal Society from 1665, he was a Royalist supporter before being falsely implicated by Titus Oates in the later discredited "Popish Plot", and executed for treason. He was beatified as a Catholic martyr by Pope Pius XI in 1929.

== Early life ==
William grew up in a nominally Anglican household, his father having converted to the Church of England in 1616. William was undoubtedly exposed to Roman Catholic influences, as almost all of the Howard family remained loyal in private to that faith, even if they conformed outwardly to the Established Church.

His grandfather, Philip Howard, 20th Earl of Arundel had been imprisoned by Elizabeth I in the Tower of London for being a Catholic and had died there in 1595 after 10 years' imprisonment. In 1620, William was placed in the household of Samuel Harsnett, Bishop of Norwich for an education, then attended St John's College, Cambridge, at age 11 in 1624, but did not receive a degree. He was still regarded as a member of the Church of England in 1633, when he was listed as an Ecclesiastical Commissioner.

Blessed William Howard
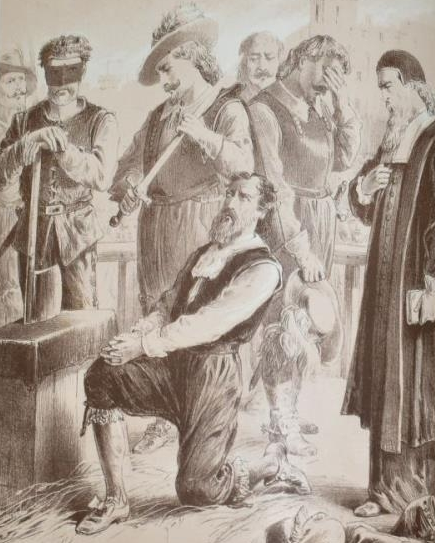
- William Viscount Stafford, "He knelt down before the block". Illustration for Memoirs of Missionary Priests by Bishop Challoner (Jack, 1878).

Martyr
- Born: 30 November 1614; Stafford, England
- Died: 29 December 1680 (aged 66); Tower Hill, London, England
- Venerated in: Roman Catholic Church
- Beatified: 15 December 1929 by Pope Pius XI
- Feast: 29 December
- Attributes: martyr's palm, rapier

== Marriage and children ==
He married Mary Stafford, daughter of Edward Stafford (died 1621) and Ann Wilford, and sister of Henry Stafford, 5th Baron Stafford (died 1637) by a licence granted 11 October 1637. The Staffords were Catholics and the marriage was conducted by a Catholic, not an Anglican, priest, to the reported embarrassment of the groom's father. Following Henry Stafford's death, and the forced (and probably illegal) surrender of the barony, on the ground of his poverty, by the next heir, Mary's distant cousin Roger Stafford, 6th Baron Stafford in 1637, the Howard family secured the title for William, he and Mary being created Baron and Baroness Stafford on 12 September 1640. Two months later, William was created Viscount Stafford. The couple had 3 sons and 6 daughters, of whom at least 8 are known:

- Henry Stafford-Howard, 1st Earl of Stafford, 2nd Viscount Stafford, who married Claude-Charlotte de Gramont, daughter of Philibert de Gramont and his wife, Elizabeth (a daughter of Sir George Hamilton); died without issue and was succeeded by his brother John's son William.
- John Stafford-Howard, who married firstly Mary Southcote, daughter of Sir John Southcote of Merstham; married secondly Theresa Strickland, daughter of Robert Strickland; father of William, 2nd Earl of Stafford and John, 4th and last Earl.
- Francis Stafford-Howard, who married Eleanor, daughter of Henry Stafford.
- Ursula Stafford-Howard, who became a nun.
- Delphina Stafford-Howard, who became a nun at Leuven: she published her father's last letter to her, in which he wrote in moving terms of his innocence of the charges of treason brought against him.
- Alethea Stafford-Howard, who became a nun.
- Isabella Stafford-Howard, who in 1669 married as his third wife John Paulet, 5th Marquess of Winchester, but had no issue.
- Anastasia Stafford-Howard, who married George Holman, of Warkworth, Northamptonshire, and had issue including Anne, who married her cousin William.

== Exile and return ==
William and his family left England in August 1641, moving to Antwerp; his parents had also left England and were living in the same area. He was allowed by Parliament to return to England with his wife for a time in 1646 and 1647, but in 1649 his estates were sequestered and he was forced to compound for recusancy and royalism. At his trial in 1680, he claimed to have performed many duties for King Charles II during the 1650s, travelling between England and the Low Countries, and visiting Rome, the Palatinate and Heidelberg; in this last, he was arrested for claims of debt against the Arundel estate. Stafford was imprisoned in 1656 in the Netherlands, this time for his father's debts. There were many family quarrels over the Howard inheritance, especially between William and his elder brother's family, who pursued a series of lawsuits against William and his mother for money allegedly due to them.

Stafford's principal character flaw seems to have been his quarrelsome nature. During the Popish Plot, he pointed out the absurdity of linking him with Lord Arundell as a co-conspirator, since it was well known that they had not been on speaking terms for 25 years. Over the years he quarrelled with many of his Howard relations, including Henry Howard, 6th Duke of Norfolk, the head of the family, which was to prove unfortunate for him in 1680 when several of his Howard cousins sat as his judges to try him for treason. According to John Evelyn, an eye-witness, of his close relatives in the House of Lords who sat in judgement, only the Earl of Arundel voted Not Guilty, showing, as Evelyn rightly remarked, that Stafford was a man "not beloved by his family".

He returned to England at the Restoration of Charles II in 1660 and was restored to his estates. By now he had long since abandoned the Anglican faith. He was never really prominent in political affairs nor among the Catholic community, although he did promote the removal of the anti-Catholic penal laws with King Charles II and James, Duke of York, and in the 1670s he apparently tried to mediate between James and the leaders of the Whig opposition. At his trial in 1680, he said vaguely that he might have promoted a policy of religious toleration in his speeches in the House of Lords, but could not remember this in any detail. He was a Fellow of the Royal Society from 1665 onwards, becoming a council member in 1672.

His relative obscurity was held against him during the Plot; informers like Stephen Dugdale cunningly invented quite plausible speeches in which he lamented the King's ingratitude and the lack of reward the Howards had received for their loyalty. In fact, Stafford, like his fellow Plot victim John Belasyse, 1st Baron Belasyse, thought that under the tolerant regime of Charles II, himself widely believed to be a secret Catholic, the Catholic nobility were as well off as they could reasonably expect to be; at his trial, he maintained that he had always argued that "we (i.e the Catholic peers) have no other interest than to be quiet." For example, it was well known to the authorities that the Catholic Mass was regularly celebrated at his London townhouse, but no action was taken against him as a result. He was frequently abroad: his visits to Paris in the late 1670s, though apparently quite innocent, were later to have fatal results, when he was accused by the informer Edward Turberville of going to Paris to hire a killer to assassinate Charles II. Stafford for his part denied that he had ever seen Turberville in his life.

== Popish Plot ==
In 1678, he was implicated in Titus Oates's later discredited "Popish Plot", and sent to the Tower of London on 31 October 1678, along with four other Catholic peers. They were due to be put on trial in early 1679, but Charles prorogued Parliament and it was delayed. The King initially seems to have had some suspicions about Stafford's loyalty, especially after hearing the seemingly plausible evidence of the informer Stephen Dugdale, and went so far as to offer Stafford a royal pardon if he would confess; but he later altered his opinion. Scepticism about the plot grew and it was thought that the imprisoned peers might be released, but anti-Catholic feelings revived in 1680 and Stafford was put on trial in November for treason. As a peer he claimed the privilege of peerage to be tried before the House of Lords, presided over by the Lord High Steward. As events would show, however, a peer could not take the sympathy of his fellow peers, even those peers who were his blood relations, for granted.

=== Trial ===
Trial began on 30 November 1680 (O.S.) at Westminster Hall, and the evidence and arguments closed on 6 December. The main evidence against Stafford came from Titus Oates, who said he had seen a document from the Pope naming Stafford as a conspirator; and from Stephen Dugdale, who testified that Stafford had tried to persuade him to kill the King when Stafford was visiting Dugdale's employers, the Astons, at their country house, Tixall, Staffordshire. A third and particularly dangerous witness, Edward Turberville (a professional soldier, and thus a plausible choice as an assassin) said that he had visited Stafford in Paris in 1676, where Stafford had tried to bribe him to kill Charles II. There were several inconsistencies in his story, especially concerning the relevant dates, but Stafford, lacking expert legal assistance, failed to exploit them properly.

Stafford, like all those who were charged with treason until the passage of the Treason Act 1695, was denied defence counsel and forced to conduct his own defence, bringing forward witnesses to counter the evidence against him. One such witness would have been Richard Gerard of Hilderstone, who had come to London to testify on Stafford's behalf but was imprisoned on the word of Stephen Dugdale; Gerard died in jail before the trial. Although the Lord High Steward, Heneage Finch, conducted the trial with exemplary fairness, this was not enough to secure Stafford's acquittal: while Stafford maintained his innocence with vigour, John Evelyn, a spectator, thought his speeches "very confused and without method". He failed, where a good defence counsel might have succeeded, in exposing the inconsistencies in the evidence of Turberville, or to discredit the unsavoury Oates, whose public standing had declined notably over the preceding year. As Evelyn also noted Stafford was "not a man beloved by his own family", and seven out of eight peers of the Howard dynasty who sat on the Court voted him Guilty. Some contemporaries, however, felt that Stafford defended himself well, under the circumstances: "yet did the prisoner, under all these disadvantages, make a better defence than was expected, either by his friends or his enemies"

A vote was taken of the peers in a roll call on 7 December 1680 (O.S., 17 December 1680 N.S.). Stafford was convicted by a majority of 55 votes of Guilty to 31 of Not Guilty and sentenced to be hanged, drawn and quartered, the punishment of traitors, which was commuted by the King to beheading. The King, even though he is not thought to have had much personal regard for the unpopular Stafford, later said that he had signed the death warrant "with tears in his eyes", but in the current state of public opinion, a reprieve was impossible. Charles added that Stafford's accusers had his blood on their hands, just as he later told the Earl of Essex that the blood of Oliver Plunkett was on his head.

=== Execution ===
Stafford was executed on Tower Hill on 29 December 1680. Gilbert Burnet wrote that he was quickly forgotten, but others thought that the publication of a version of his final words, addressed to his daughter Delphina (who was a nun at Leuven), in which he spoke eloquently of his innocence – "My good child, I pray God bless you. ...Your poor old father hath this comfort, that he is totally innocent" – helped to turn public opinion against the Plot. The early deaths of Dugdale and Turberville, the principal informers against him, were seen by some as proof of the innocence of Stafford and other victims of the plot: Stafford himself was said to have prophesied (correctly) that Turberville would follow him to the grave within the year. To the surprise of many, Turberville to the very last maintained the truth of his charges against Stafford: Gilbert Burnet thought Stafford's innocence or guilt a mystery beyond solution.

=== Attainder ===
Stafford was attainted and the family lost the title. The well-intentioned efforts of King James II in 1685 to have the attainder reversed failed, due to deadlock between the two Houses of Parliament on the issue, and later to the King's unwillingness to recall his increasingly obstructive Parliament. The title of Baron Stafford was returned to the Howard line in 1824, with the attainder being reversed, but the title of Viscount was extinct as there were no male heirs. His widow, Mary, had her titles restored with the accession of James II, as a consolation for the failure to reverse the attainder on her husband, and she was created Countess of Stafford on 5 October 1688, at the same time her son was created Earl of Stafford.

== Legacy ==
William Howard was beatified by Pope Pius XI on 15 December 1929.

There is a stained glass window of Howard in Our Lady of Lourdes in Harpenden, Hertfordshire.

Blessed William Howard Catholic School in Stafford, Staffordshire, England is named after him in his honour.

== Ancestry ==
Ancestors of William Howard, 1st Viscount Stafford

8. Thomas Howard, 4th Duke of Norfolk
4. Philip Howard, 20th Earl of Arundel
9. Lady Mary FitzAlan
2. Thomas Howard, 21st Earl of Arundel
10. Thomas Dacre, 4th Baron Dacre
5. Hon. Anne Dacre
11. Elizabeth Leyburne
1. William Howard, 1st Viscount Stafford
12. George Talbot, 6th Earl of Shrewsbury
6. Gilbert Talbot, 7th Earl of Shrewsbury
13. Lady Gertrude Manners
3. Lady Alethea Tabot
14. Sir William Cavendish
7. Mary Cavendish
15. Elizabeth Hardwick

== Notes ==
Peerage of England
New creation	Viscount Stafford; 1640–1680	Forfeit
New creation	Baron Stafford; 5th creation 1640–1680	Forfeit title restored to George Stafford-Jerningham in 1824
