= Charles Carroll =

Charles Carroll may refer to:

- Charles Carroll the Settler (1661–1720), early Maryland planter and lawyer, father of Charles Carroll of Annapolis
- Charles Carroll of Annapolis (1702–1782), Maryland Catholic planter, son of Carroll the Settler and father of Charles Carroll of Carrollton
- Charles Carroll (barrister) (1723–1783), Continental congressman from Maryland
- Charles Carroll of Carrollton (1737–1832), signer of U.S. Declaration of Independence for Maryland, son of Charles Carroll of Annapolis and uncle of Charles H. Carroll
  - USS Charles Carroll
  - SS Charles Carroll
- Charles H. Carroll (1794–1865), U.S. congressman for New York, nephew of Charles Carroll of Carrollton
- Charles Carroll (philanthropist) (1865–1921), member of New York Society during the Gilded Age
- Charles J. Carroll (1882–1942), American lawyer and politician
- Charles Carroll (British Army officer) (1923–1992), British soldier of the Brigade of Gurkhas, Second World War
- Chuck Carroll (1906–2003), American football player

== See also ==
- Charles Carroll High School (closed in 2013), a former high school in Philadelphia, Pennsylvania
- Charles Carrollo (1902–1979), Kansas City, Missouri crime boss
