= William Johnson House (Ellicott City, Maryland) =

- Location within Maryland
- 39°15′02.1″N 76°53′06.3″W
- Nearest city: Ellicott City, Maryland

History
- Built: pre 1880

Site notes
- Architectural style: Vernacular Frame

The William Johnson House is a historic house supporting Doughoregan Manor in Ellicott City, Maryland.

The Johnson house is a historic located on land that was patented to Charles Carroll the Settler in 1702. The property was part of the 7000 acre Carroll family slave plantation Doughoreagan Manor, most notable as home of Charles Carroll of Carrollton, signer of the declaration of Independence. The William E. Johnson home was a two-story L-shaped house of wood construction built prior to 1880. The wide central chimney was typical of earlier construction. The house was situated on a 112-acre subdivision of the manor bordering a farm owned by Phillip Carroll, and James A. Clark, Jr.'s Elioak Farm. The house was documented in 1979, but was demolished by 1982.

In 1988, owners Thomas and Mary Scrivener place the farm into Howard County's agricultural preservation program. In 2004, they split the farm into two separate 50 acre farms. In 2012 owners E Randolph and Mary Marriner, petitioned to build a house over the original house site. The estate was renamed to Manor Hill Farms, and in 2014 the Howard County Economic Development Agency awarded a $200,000 grant to open Manor Hill Brewery onsite.

== See also ==
- Doughoregan Manor
