= Beth Rogan =

British film actress (1931–2015)

Beth Rogan on the cover of Picturegoer magazine, November 1958.

Jenifer Puckle (19 July 1931 – 25 November 2015), known professionally as Beth Rogan, was a British film actress and Rank Films starlet of the 1950s and 60s. She was married and divorced three times, said by friends to be charming but "dangerous to know", and grew her own cannabis. Reputedly, she was the model for Diana Scott, the central character in John Schlesinger's film Darling (1965).

== Early life ==
Puckle was born in Walmer, Kent. She was always known as Jeni to friends and family. Her father was Kenneth Puckle, a major in the Royal Marines and a veteran of the Gallipoli campaign and her mother was Enid Puckle (née Gray). She had a sister, Priscilla, who married brigadier Charles Carroll, MC. Jeni was educated near Farnham and then taught Latin to boys at a local preparatory school before starting a course at Wimbledon School of Art. She worked as an illustrator and model before entering films.

== Film career ==
Puckle's film career began after she was spotted by the Italian television correspondent Carlo Riccono and a friend from Rank Studios while queuing at the All-England Tennis Club at Wimbledon. They invited her to join them for tennis and two weeks later Rogan had entered Rank's talent school, the Company of Youth.

According to The Telegraph, Puckle specialised in "screaming or swooning" and although not usually a leading lady, she appeared in at least 14 films between 1957 and 1968. She became friends with Dirk Bogarde, who suggested her screen name of Beth Rogan. Her first starring roles were Innocent Meeting (1958) and Compelled (1960) where she had joint top billing with Ronald Howard. She also had a significant part playing Elena Fairchild in the Jules Verne adventure Mysterious Island (1961) opposite Herbert Lom as Captain Nemo, where she was assailed by a giant hen and giant bees animated by Ray Harryhausen. For half the film she was dressed in a loosely stitched buckskin costume.

Filmink magazine wrote "Rank had a good record of finding attractive female starlets with strong personalities, signing them to long term contracts, putting them in mediocre films, then getting upset when they found the starlets too hot to handle and prone to rebel", giving Rogan as an example.

Rogan was reputedly the model for Diana Scott, the wild central character played by Julie Christie in John Schlesinger's film Darling (1965). New York magazine described Diana Scott as "amoral, rootless, emotionally immature, and apparently irresistible". At Rank, Rogan had met publicist Jeanne Hunter and together they had written a 300-page account of her life. Before it could be published, however, Rogan had given the manuscript to Joseph Janni, one of the men the young Jeni had met while queuing at Wimbledon, who went on to produce Darling. Hunter said that Rogan felt she owed Janni. She bought Hunter a puppy as compensation.

== Marriages and children ==
Jeni Puckle was first married at a young age to Ted Draper, one of her teachers at Wimbledon School of Art. The marriage allowed her to leave the family home but was later dissolved after Puckle began an affair with Riccono. Draper agreed to fake an assignation at a hotel in Brighton in order to allow a divorce. Later she was seen about town with the entrepreneur James Hanson. In 1962, she married Shell oil heir and publisher Tony Samuel at Chelsea Register Office. The couple divided their time between London and her husband's family home of Arndilly House in Scotland but Samuel was inclined to be irascible and they divorced in 1965. Samuel married Mercy Haystead in 1966. Rogan's final marriage was in 1971, to barrister Timothy Cassel with whom she had a daughter, Natalia, and a son, Alexander. That marriage ended in 1976.

== Later life ==
Rogan's last film appearance was in Salt and Pepper in 1968. After her last divorce she lived in West Sussex and Hampshire. She died on 25 November 2015 in Emsworth, Hampshire. After her death, home-grown cannabis was found drying in the airing cupboard at her home.

== Selected appearances ==
- Doctor at Large (1957)
- The Admirable Crichton (1957)
- Innocent Meeting (1958)
- The Captain's Table (1959)
- Compelled (1960)
- Operation Cupid (1960)
- Mysterious Island (1961)
- Salt and Pepper (1968)
