= 1840s Carrollton Inn =

Hotel in Baltimore, Maryland, United States

Coordinates: 39°17′19.2″N 76°36′14.6″W

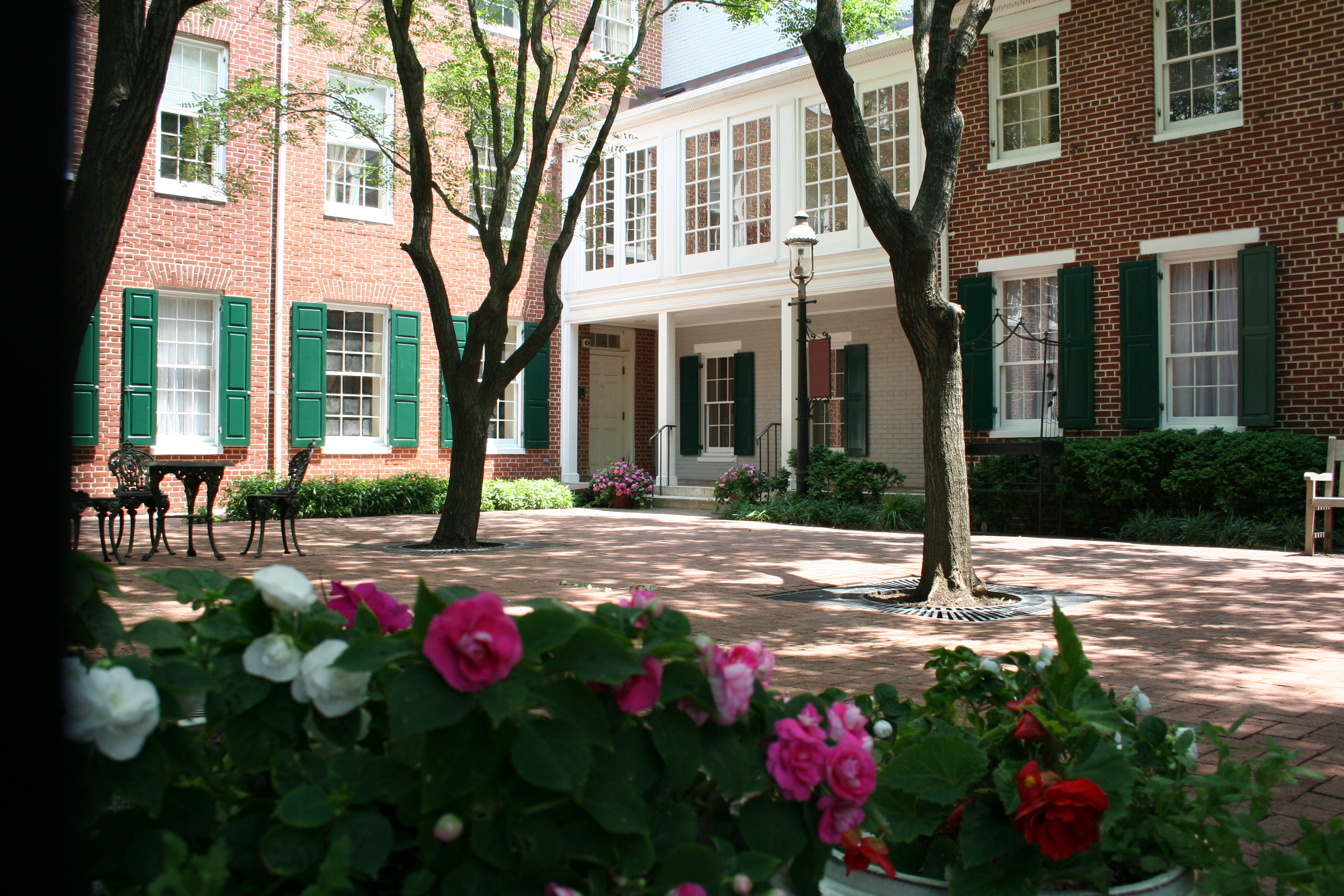
1840s Carrollton Inn's Courtyard

The 1840s Carrollton Inn and Plaza, located in Baltimore, Maryland, consists of two historic buildings and their complementary 1980 additions built to resemble the previous federal style buildings. The oldest of the row house buildings dates back to the late 18th century, and anchors the east side of the block containing the Carroll Mansion, which was not part of the inn, but the winter home of Charles Carroll of Carrollton, signer of the Declaration of Independence. These buildings and others were assembled by the City of Baltimore in the 1980s and became the Baltimore City Life Museums until its closure in 1997 due to financial issues. The 1840s Carrollton Inn opened in July 2007. Each of the 13 boutique rooms has whirlpool baths, fireplaces, and antique furnishings.

The main entrance to the building is through the historic doorway at 50 Albemarle. The home was bought by John Dalrymple from the heirs of George Davy in 1796 for $3,300 (equivalent to $59,453 in 2025). Dalrymple was probably a principal in the construction of the remainder of the buildings on Lombard and Albemarle. Along with James Mosher, he was co-architect and builder of the First Presbyterian Church (1791) at Fayette and Guilford. The three-story brick house retains its Flemish bond brickwork and splayed brick lintels. One mantel is original to the house. A noteworthy feature is the huge fireplace in the basement, which was used for cooking. This building was sold to John Hutchinson, a wheelwright in the 1840s. Grocers and other businesses used the house until the last private owner, renting to a variety store, closed shop in 1983. After renovation by the Baltimore City Life Museums, the Hutchinson family's life was portrayed as living history during public programs, and through museum tours of what was known as "1840 House." The adjoining 1860 smaller house to the west features six over six wood windows and shuttered first-floor windows set in segmented arches and was also used for living history on the first floor.

Though the remaining buildings were demolished by the City Life Museums for public safety, the architects chose to construct buildings close to the originals in exterior appearance. The new addition adjacent to the Carroll Mansion closely resembled an early 1900 photograph and housed the Center for Urban Archaeology. The three buildings on Albemarle damaged by fire and demolished were rebuilt and housed the “Courtyard Gallery” and the museum offices.

In 1996, the Fava building, on the north side of the courtyard, was opened as the Morton K. Blaustein City Life Exhibition Center. Four floors of exhibits and galleries illustrated Baltimore's distinct history and culture over three centuries. Its signature feature was the reuse of the cast iron façade of the 1869 G. Fava Fruit Company. Over 100 cast-iron buildings existed in Baltimore before the Fire of 1904. Today, less than 12 remain. The Fava façade, Baltimore's largest, stood until 1976, when it was condemned to make way for the Convention Center. Its reuse in the Blaustein City Life Exhibition Center won numerous awards.

The buildings were retained as city property until 2003, when the space was bought by the Pomykala family, who combined the row homes into the 1840s Carrollton Inn and created the 1840s Plaza. The Pomykala Family turned the Fava Building's top floor into an event space with panoramic views of Baltimore and called it The Ballroom. They rented the three first floors to a local restaurateur, who opened Gardel's Restaurant and Supper Club. Gardel's was noted for Latin dancing and night life in the after hours. Its closure allowed the Pomykala family to remodel their three other levels within the Fava Building into distinct event spaces. Since that time, the 1840s Plaza has been the scene of numerous weddings, parties and conferences.

The gated courtyard gardens on the lower level create a promenade between the Fava Building and the Carroll Mansion. Designed to give a hint of the past, they include boxwood, flowers of the Carroll period, and a herb garden. Underneath the brick, where Charles Carroll of Carrollton's stable was sited, is a hypocaust. This, perhaps, was used to keep the water warm for the horses in the cold winters. The upper courtyard with its tall flowering trees and boxwood is enclosed by the 1840s Carrollton Inn.

In 2001, all of these buildings were added to the Baltimore City Landmark list as an expansion of the Carroll Mansion Landmark designation.
