= Aghagurty =

Townland in County Offaly, Ireland

Coordinates: 53.06°N 7.75°W

Aghagurty (Irish: Áth an Ghorta) is a townland in County Offaly, Ireland. It is approximately 1.5 square kilometres (0.6 sq mi) in area. Aghagurty was the ancestral home of Charles Carroll of Carrollton, the only Catholic signatory of the American Declaration of Independence, whose grandfather, Charles Carroll the Settler, is believed to have been born in the locality—his father being known as Daniel Carroll of Aghagurty and Littermurna.
