= Statue of Charles Carroll =

Statue in the U.S. Capitol

Charles Carroll
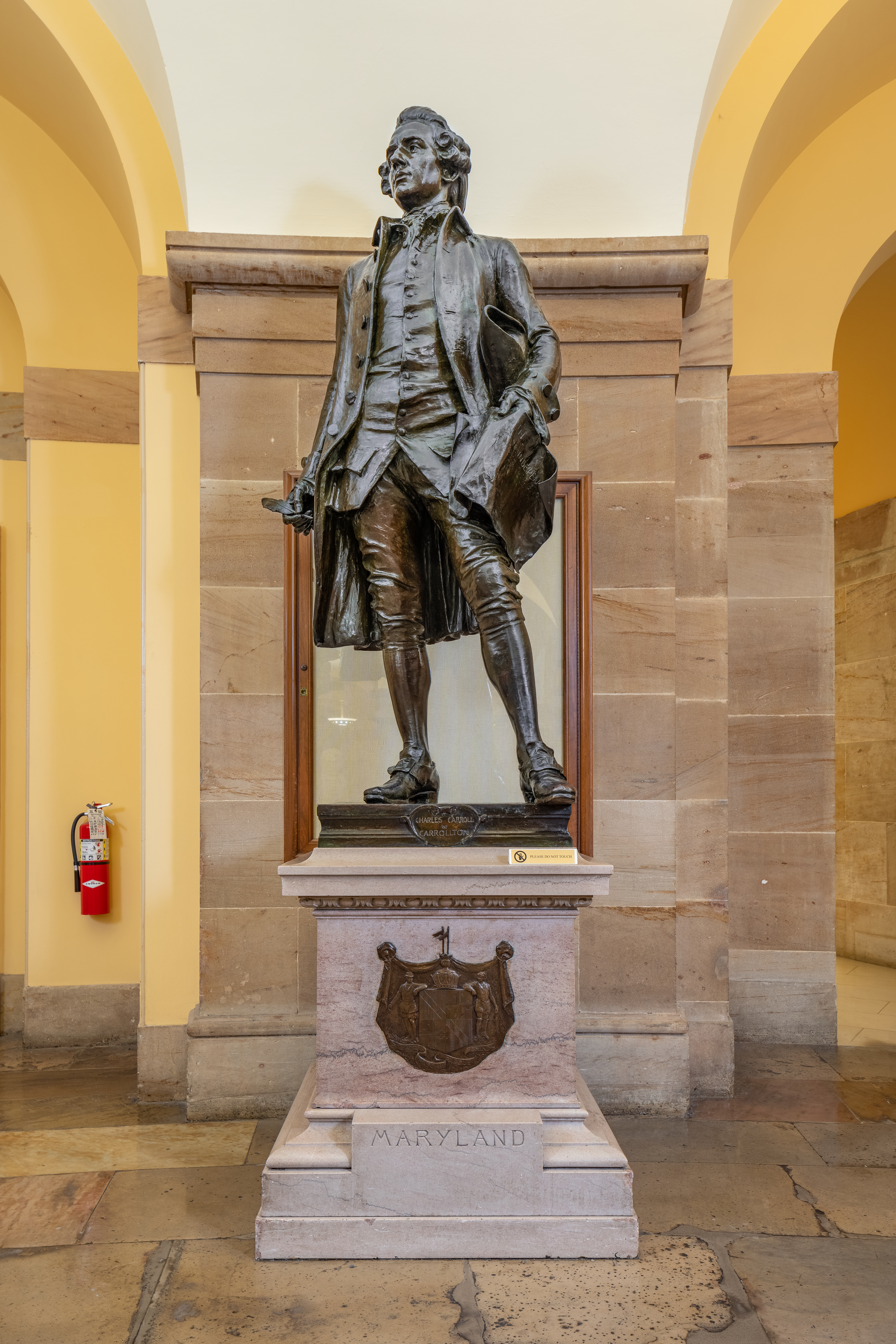
- The statue at the U.S. Capitol crypt in 2022
- Artist: Richard E. Brooks
- Medium: Bronze sculpture
- Subject: Charles Carroll of Carrollton
- Location: Washington, D.C., United States

A bronze statue of American Founding Father Charles Carroll of Carrollton by Richard E. Brooks is installed in the crypt of the United States Capitol, in Washington, D.C., as part of the National Statuary Hall Collection. It was gifted by the U.S. state of Maryland in 1903.

== See also ==
- 1903 in art
