= Carroll Hall =

University residence hall in Indiana, United States

Coordinates: 41°42′7″N 86°14′52″W

- Arms: Gules, two lions rampant combatant or, armed argent and langued gules, supporting a sword proper paleways point upwards
- Campus quad: Far
- Motto: "All are most welcome."
- Established: 1967 (building erected 1906)
- Named for: Charles Carroll
- Former names: Dujarie Hall
- Architectural style: Italianate and Renaissance revival
- Colors: Crimson and gold
- Gender: Male
- Undergraduates: 102
- Postgraduates: 2
- Chapel: Saint André Bessette
- Mascot: Vermin
- Sports: Baseball, basketball, bowling, cross country, dodgeball, football, golf, hockey, lacrosse, racquetball, soccer, table tennis, tennis, volleyball
- Charities: Boys and Girls Club of Saint Joseph County
- Major events: A Carroll Christmas, Lakeside Music Festival
- Website: https://carrollhall.nd.edu/

Carroll Hall is one of the 33 Residence Halls on the campus of the University of Notre Dame and one of the 17 male dorms. Carroll is located on the shores of St. Mary's Lake, and is the smallest of the residence halls, housing around 100 undergraduates.

Built in 1906, it initially served as novitiate for the Brothers of the Congregation of Holy Cross and was known as "Dujarie Institute", before being sold to the University of Notre Dame and converted into a residence hall in 1966. Its mascot is the Vermin, and its colors are crimson and gold. The coat of arms is based on the Carroll family, adapted to the dorm colors. The hall is named after Charles Carroll, Founding Father and the only Catholic signer of the Declaration of Independence.

It is listed by Indiana Register of Historic Sites and Structures as 'outstanding' for its historic or architectural significance, the highest rating possible.

== History ==
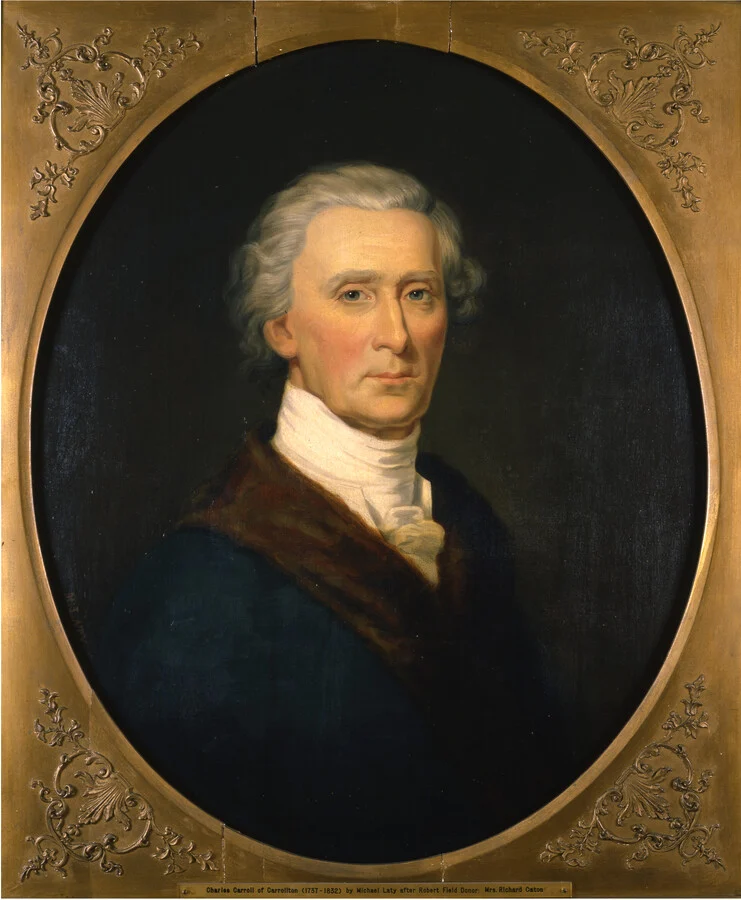
Charles Carroll of Carrollton, the namesake of Carroll Hall

Carroll Hall was constructed in 1906 by Brother Charles Borromeo Harding and christened "Dujarie Institute" after Jacques-François Dujarié. The building was designed by Brother Charles Harding. The foundations were laid December 8, 1906 by the Congregation of Holy Cross Superior Giblert Francois and it was dedicated in an elaborate ceremony in August 1907 by Herman Joseph Alerding, bishop of Fort Wayne. Presiding the dedication, which included a mass and procession at the Sacred Heart Church, were Brothers Basil, CSC, and Boniface, CSC, who had entered the community sixty years earlier. Dujarié had founded in 1820 the Brothers of St. Joseph, who eventually on August 31, 1835, came under the control of Basil Moreau, CSC, and they developed into the Brothers of the Congregation of Holy Cross.

From then, it was used as a seminary for the Brothers of Holy Cross, the Dujare institute or scholasticate, where the novitiates studies and lived before professing their final vows. It hosted between 100 and 125 novitiates and featured an imposing exterior and inside it has class rooms, study halls, a dormitory, music hall, chapel, recreation rooms, dining hall, a kitchen and an interior heating plant. In 1920, St. André Bessette lodged in the building, in room 306, a small plain chamber with white walls and a single window, which today has been incorporated in the suite occupied by the assistant rector.

In 1966, the Brothers sold the property to the University of Notre Dame, and in the fall of 1966 around a 100 students moved in, all juniors and seniors. Rev. Thomas McDonagh CSC was its first rector. In 1966, the building's name was changed to Carroll Hall, in honor of Charles Carroll. He is sometimes referred to as one of the Founding Fathers of the United States, although he was not involved in framing the United States Constitution. He served as a delegate to the Continental Congress and Confederation Congress and later as first United States Senator for Maryland. He was the sole Catholic signer of the Declaration of Independence. Carroll was the last surviving signer of the Declaration of Independence, and the longest lived. He was also the cousin of the first Catholic Bishop in the United States, Archbishop John Carroll, of which the university holds several memorabilia in the museum of the Basilica of the Sacred Heart. The Carroll family has had a huge impact in the history of Catholicism in the United States and Notre Dame. According to a 1966 article in the South Bend Tribune, the hall was named for Archbishop John Carroll. The name Carroll Hall had originally been given to a dormitory for approximately 350 boys 13–17 years old that was located in the west wing of the third floor of the Main Administration building, but it was suppressed in 1946 when the rooms were converted into office space and the name retired.

Since 1966, Carroll has housed undergraduate male students, except briefly from 1970 until 1977, when it hosted graduate students. Ever since Holy Cross Hall was demolished in 1990, Carroll has been the only undergraduate dormitory on a lake. In 1979, Carroll Hall students voted to abolish parietals, but were met by opposition from the university administration and Rev. Theodore Hesburgh.

Richard Mazzei was an interim rector. He served as principal, administrator, and coach for Catholic schools in Massachusetts spanning four decades. He holds a bachelor's degree in Business Administration from the University of Notre Dame and a master's degree in American History from Salem State University. He has been involved in Notre Dame hall staff since 2014, when he was rector of Fisher Hall. Eric T. Styles was rector from 2016 to 2024.

=== Description ===
Carroll Hall lies on the southwest shores of St. Mary's Lake, from which it enjoys views of the Main Administration Building and the Basilica of the Sacred Heart, in what has been described as one of the prettiest spots on campus. In front of the building is Carroll Lawn, also known as Far Quad, and hosts a sand volleyball court, and in between the hall and the lake is a basketball court. Carroll Hall has some of the largest rooms on campus, and has the smallest population. It is located in an isolated position in respect to campus, and is the furthest dorm from the Notre Dame Stadium.

The hall is a five-story building in yellow Notre Dame brick, with classical decorations and a simple unadorned facade. It is built in Italianate style with Renaissance Revival and Romanesque Revival details. Its architect was Br. Charles Borromeo Harding, who also worked on Crowley, St. Edward's, and Corby Halls, and also on the Basilica. The first floor host mainly social spaces, with a large living room with portraits of past presidents, a kitchen, study rooms, the mailroom, and the chapel. The chapel is modern and simple, and is dedicated to St. André Bessette. It hosts several modern stained windows and a wooden statue of the Pietà. André Bessette stayed in Carroll Hall twice, in 1920 and 1927. The basement hosts a laundry room, a fitness room, and storage and utility spaces. The upper floors hosts the dorm rooms, which are mostly singles, doubles, triples and quads. It is listed by Indiana Register of Historic Sites and Structures as 'outstanding' for its historic or architectural significance, the highest rating possible.

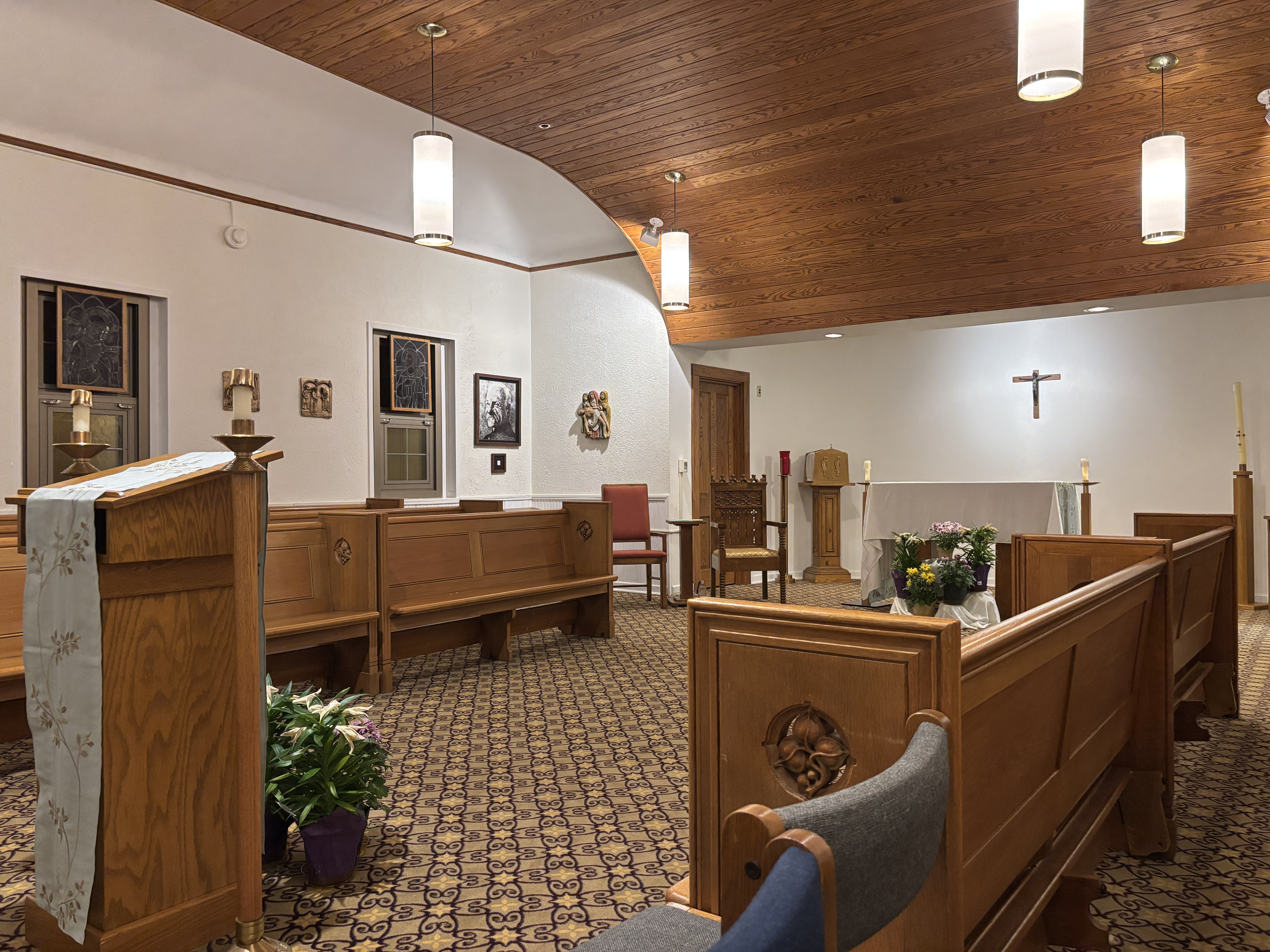
Chapel of St. Andre Bessette in Carroll Hall

== Traditions ==
Nicknamed the Vermin, Carroll Hall is known for its distance from the rest of campus. It has the smallest populations of students and the largest rooms on campus. The distant location from the rest of the campus and the small size of the dorm, makes the community especially tight knit and has given rise to many traditions and unique features. The Vermin nickname originated from the rodent population that infested the building between the departure of the Brothers in 1966 and the arrival of undergrads the following year.

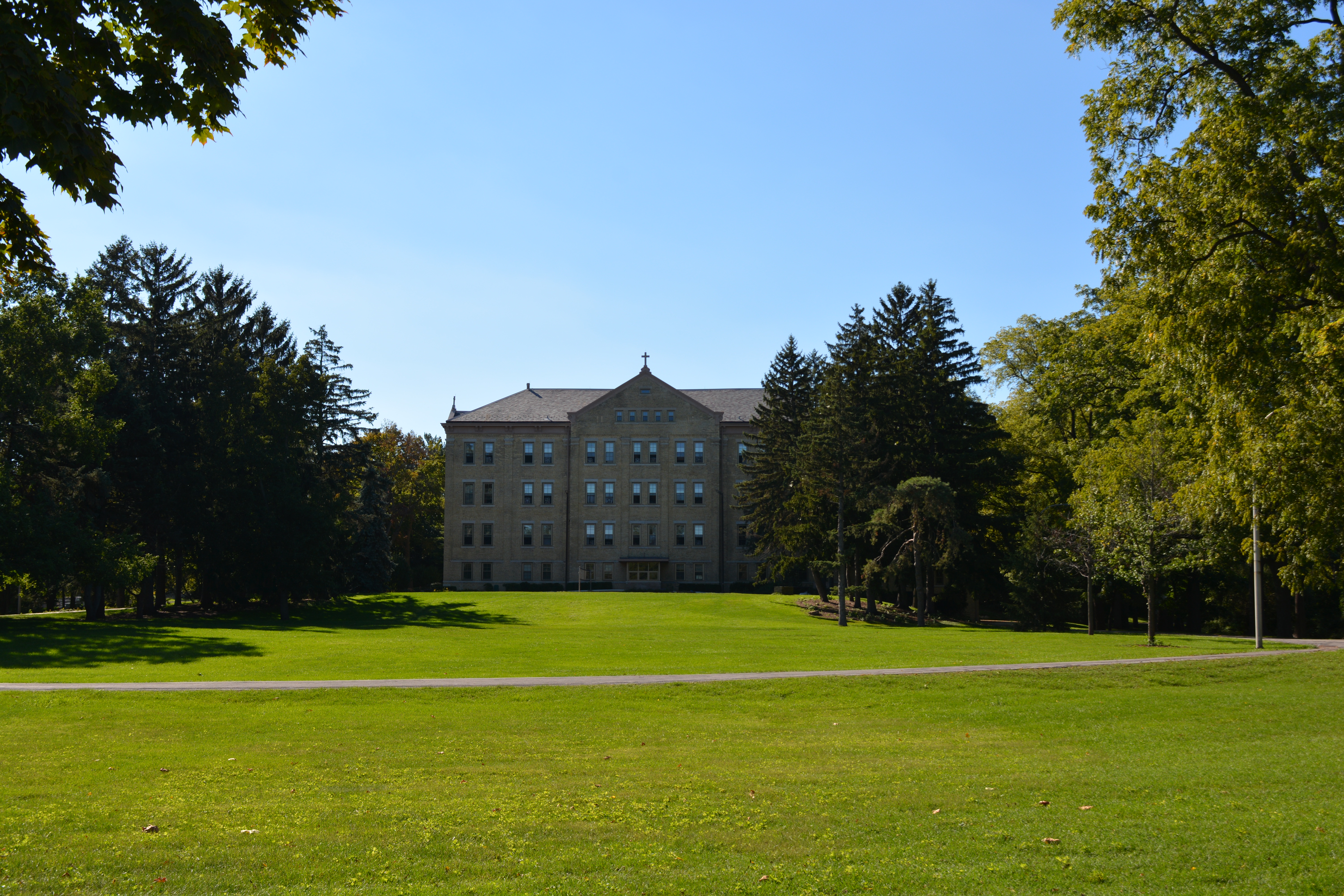
Carroll Hall and FarQuad seen from St. Mary's lake

Each year, before the first home football game, the approximately 35 First Years in Carroll dye their hair blond, in a tradition dubbed Vermin Go Gold, in support of the football team. On football Saturdays, the Hall's facade is draped with a huge banner displaying the text "GO IRISH". It is made out of 72 bed sheets, 52,000 staples, and 5 gallons of green paint, and it is raised up on Friday afternoons. The tradition started in 2000, ahead of the football match against Nebraska.

Started in 1998 and held on the first Friday of December, Carroll Christmas is one of Notre Dame's best known signature events and is Carroll's signature event. Events feature the lighting a 40-foot Christmas tree, performances from on-campus groups like the Glee Club and Humor Artists, Christmas carols from all the Vermin, horse-drawn carriages on Carroll Drive, dance parties, a giant "C" hanging on the facade, and paper luminaries. Carroll residents also dress up as Santa Claus, Mrs. Claus, and the elves to entertain the guests, which comprise around a 1000 students every year. In recent years, Carroll Christmas has featured an appearance by ESPN College Gameday Analyst Digger Phelps, an extremely competitive cookie contest, and a horse-drawn carriage from LaFortune student center all the way to Carroll. Previously, into the mid-1990s, Carroll Hall held an annual haunted house on the Friday closest to Halloween.

Since 2015 (as part of AnToastal), Carroll has launched the Lakeside Music Festival, which takes place in the spring and it includes music by many different campus groups, food, sports, and other activities, and it raises money for the Boys & Girls Club of St. Joseph's County. Other events include Third Floor Abs, a fitness program that has spread throughout campus, and Friday cookouts, which take place on the FarQuad in front of the lake. Carroll Hall's charity efforts go towards helping Boys & Girls Club of St. Joseph's County, and Carroll residents volunteer to help kids with homework and provide school supplies.

== Notable residents ==
- Carlyle Holiday
- Jeff Burris
- Bertrand Berry
- James A. Burns
- Miles Boykin
- Jimmy Brogan
- Greg Andres
- Sean Conley
- Arnaz Battle
- Anthony Weaver
- Peter Richardson (American director)
- Joe Alt

== Sources ==
- Hall Profile
