= Doughoregan Manor =

Historic house in Maryland, United States

- U.S. National Register of Historic Places
- U.S. National Historic Landmark
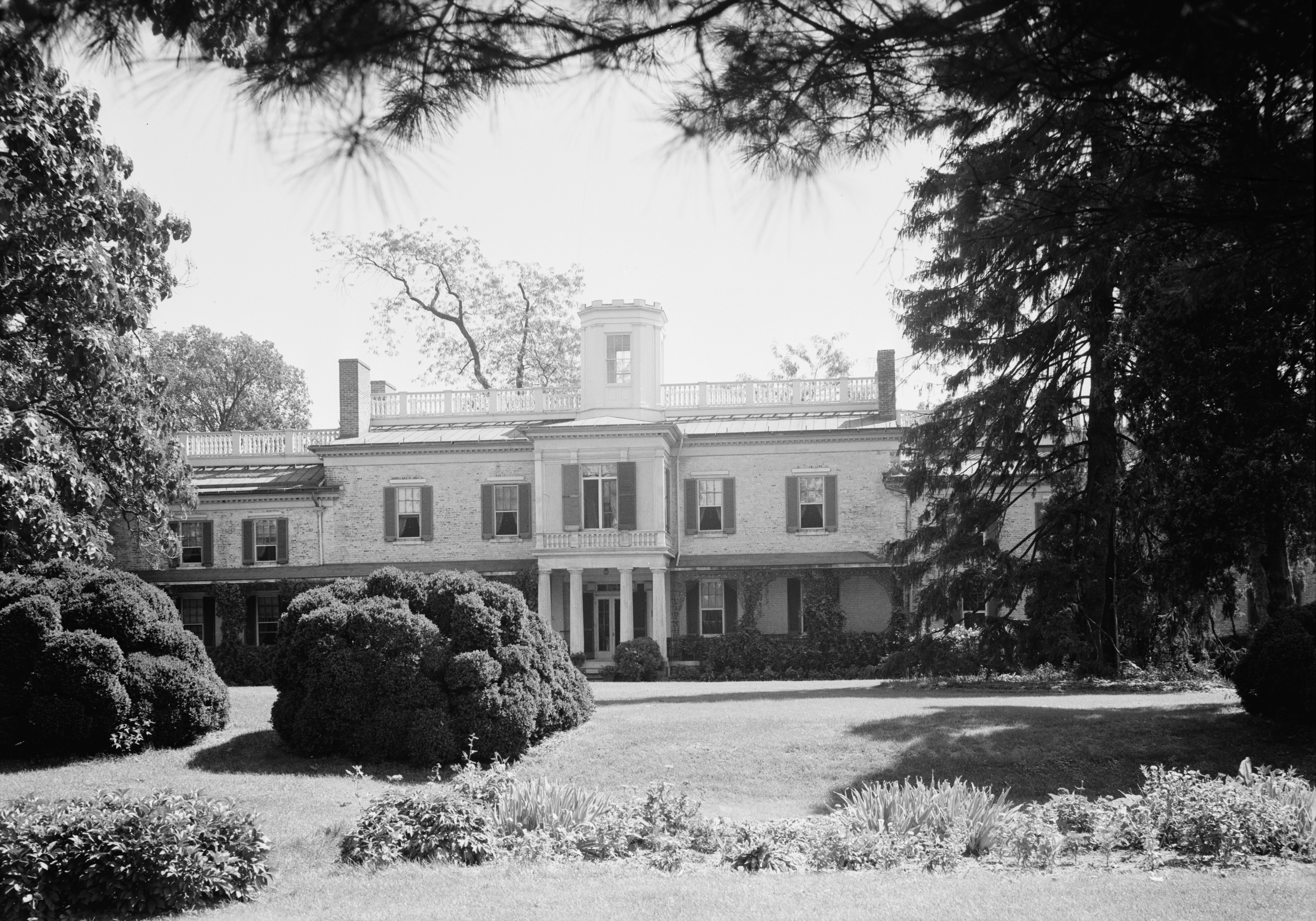
- Doughoregan Manor, 1936

- Location within Maryland Location within the United States
- Location: Manor Lane, Ellicott City, Maryland
- Coordinates: 39°16′36″N 76°53′35″W
- Area: 900 acres (360 ha) (landmarked area)
- Built: est. 1727
- Architectural style: Greek Revival
- NRHP reference No.: 71000376

Significant dates
- Added to NRHP: November 11, 1971
- Designated NHL: November 11, 1971

Doughoregan Manor (doe-RAY-gin) is a plantation house and estate located on Manor Lane west of Ellicott City, Maryland, United States. Established in the early 18th century as the seat of Maryland's prominent Carroll family, it was home to Founding Father Charles Carroll, a signer of the United States Declaration of Independence, during the late 18th century. A portion of the estate, including the main house, was designated a National Historic Landmark on November 11, 1971. It remains in the Carroll family as a private working farm and Manor Lane was closed to the public in 1980.

== History ==
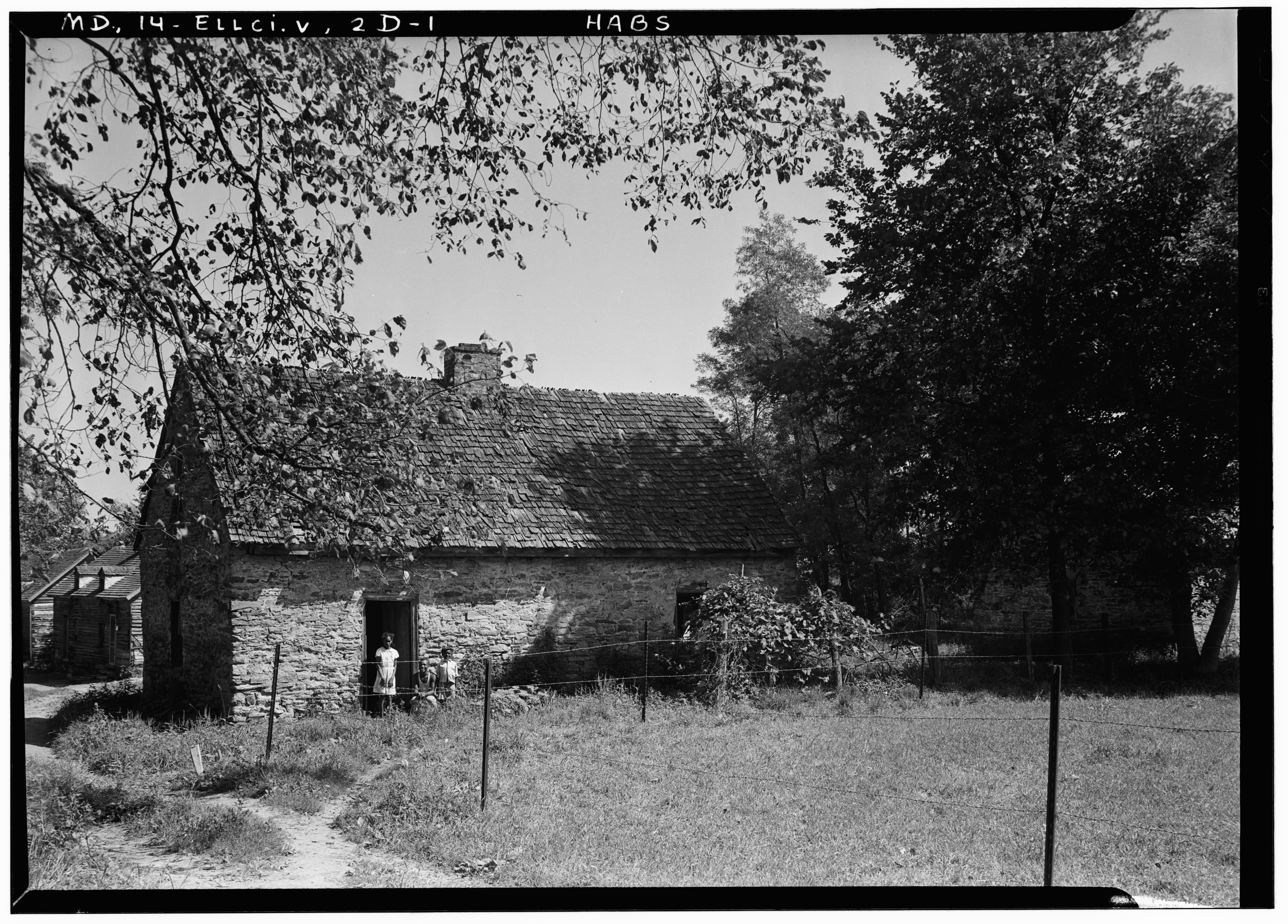
Doughoregan Slave Quarters

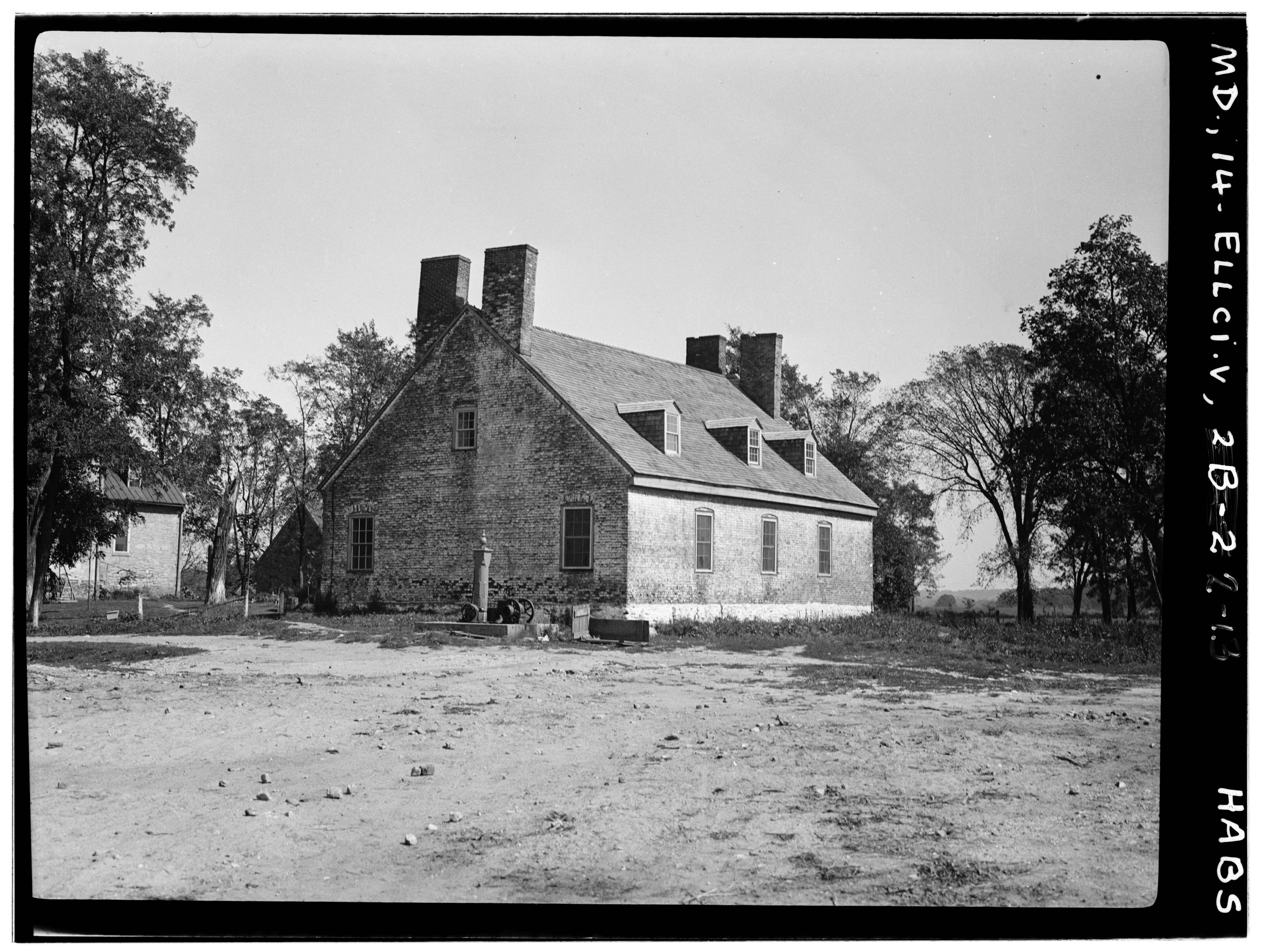
Carriage House circa 1940

Doughoregan Manor is a colonial manor house built in the early 18th century. The slave plantation was founded on 7,000 acres patented to Charles Carroll I as "Doughoreagan" (sometimes spelled Doororegan) named after a family estate in Ireland, in 1702, and expanded to 10,000 acres as "Doughoreagan Manor" in 1717. The Georgian brick plantation house, built by Charles Carroll II around 1727, was enlarged and remodeled in 1832 by Charles Carroll V in the Greek Revival style.

From 1766 to 1832, Doughoregan Manor was the country home of Charles Carroll of Carrollton, (Charles Carroll III) last surviving signer of the Declaration of Independence. He lies buried in the chapel attached to the north end of the mansion. Notable guests that have visited the manor include George Washington, Thomas Jefferson, John Adams, John Hancock, Benjamin Franklin, James Monroe, and Marquis de Lafayette. In 1861, the manor became the home of John Lee Carroll, who became Governor of Maryland.

In its current configuration the Manor is a brick, two-storied, U-shaped building. The roof is in gabled sections, some with balustraded decks, and in the center is an octagonal cupola. The front center entrance has a one-story tetrastyle Doric portico and is similar to the rear portico. The chapel and kitchen are attached to the main block by hyphens.

The private chapel attached to the manor house was built at a time when the founding of Roman Catholic parish churches was prohibited in the colony. The chapel served as the primary meeting place for the local Catholic community until as late as 1855 when nearby parishes were founded. The chapel continued to be open to the public on Sunday mornings for Mass until the 1990s.

A vineyard was planted by Charles Carroll of Annapolis in 1770 with four types of grapes. The vineyard was maintained into 1796, becoming one of the longest surviving colonial vineyards in the United States. A postal office served the manor from 18 September 1876 to 31 August 1907. The manor became the site for the yearly Howard County Horse Show through the 1930s, attracting thousands. The "Manor Dairy" opened in 1962 providing milk and dairy products.

The Carroll family were enthusiastic horse breeders and raced thoroughbreds, competing with other well-to-do families at annual racing events, which also formed an important part of the social and political life of the colony. Charles Carroll of Annapolis's horse was beaten in 1743 by George Hume Steuart's "Dungannon" in the Annapolis Subscription Plate, established that year.

In 1830, Emily Caton MacTavish donated 253 acres to build St. Charles College, Maryland, After a fire in 1911, Carroll family heirs sued to sell the property and divide the proceeds among the family.

During the Civil war, the manor served as a hub for munitions for Southern supporters, also using nearby Mt. Pleasant as a substation. By 1931, the manor estate consisted of the mansion, overseer's house, horse stable, bank barn, 3 silos, corn house, 11 tenant houses, wash house, sheep house, coach house, brick barn and two barracks.

Members of the Carroll family still own and live in the manor, which sits at the center of an 892-acre (3.61 km^{2}; 1.394 sq mi) of the original 13,361.5-acre (54.072 km^{2}; 20.8773 sq mi) estate. Land was divided among the heirs each generation, sold for subdivisions, with at least 2,800-acre (11 km^{2}; 4.4 sq mi) owned by the family as late as 1971 and 2,400-acre (9.7 km^{2}; 3.8 sq mi) by 1977. According to a newspaper article: "As one family member put it a few years ago, 'Only God, the Indians and the Carrolls have owned this land.'"

The estate and Manor Lane are closed to the public.

== Tax credits and development plans ==
In 1971, the owner, Phillip Carroll, did not want to commit all 2,042 acres to landmark status, preferring to leave part of it for future development, so about 900 acres were designated landmark status, according to the National Register of Historic Places inventory sheet. However, with the 1976 Tax Reform Act, the owner changed his mind and requested the landmark status encompass all the acreage, which was granted.

The 30-year tax credit and Maryland Historical Trust's easement expired in 2007. In an attempt to keep the majority of the property in the hands of the Carroll family, they struck a deal in 2008 with Erickson Retirement Communities to sell 150 acres, but the deal fell through the following year. Camilla Carroll, co-owner of the estate, insisted that "...there is no money now to restore anything, and historic buildings are falling down as we speak."

The County Commissioners voted in 2010 to pay the Carroll family about 19 million dollars over twenty years to place 500 acres in Howard County's Agricultural Preservation program. The council approved paying to expand the public water and sewer system to the development and the Carrolls would donate 34 acres to expand a county park. 221 acres of Doughoregan Manor were rezoned to allow 325 single-family homes to be built on the north-east side of the property. Many neighbors were concerned with the plans and a petition was filed in circuit court for judicial review of the zoning decision.

In 2015, tax credits were awarded for work on an outbuilding at Doughoregan as one of the nine buildings listed in the 2015 Sustainable Communities Tax Credits of $10 million.

== Description ==
The house was originally a 1 1/2-story brick house, about 30 feet deep and 66 feet wide, with a gambrel roof. A detached brick chapel stood to the north, while a brick kitchen stood to the south. The dependent buildings were incorporated into the main structure in the 1830s by Charles Carroll V, raising the main house's roof to make a two-story structure. The new roof was topped by a balustraded deck with an octagonal cupola. The front (east) facade gained a one-story portico with doric columns. A similar portico to the road was built with a room above, while a marble-floored veranda with iron columns extended to each side. The chapel's roof was raised and it was joined to the main house by a two-story passage, as was the kitchen. The work resulted in a Palladian style five-part house extending almost 300 feet (91 m).

The house's interior has a center-hall plan, with the oak-paneled main hall extending the full depth (30 feet) of the house. Stairs are located in a small side hall on the north side. A library, large parlor, small parlor and dining room occupy the first floor, with bedrooms on the second.

== See also ==
- List of Howard County properties in the Maryland Historical Trust
- St. Charles College, Maryland – Built on a section of land given and returned to the Carroll Family
- Homewood Farm – Built on estate in 1872 for Robert Goodloe Harper Carroll.
- William Johnson House (Ellicott City, Maryland)
- List of National Historic Landmarks in Maryland
- National Register of Historic Places listings in Howard County, Maryland
