= Anne Marie Becraft =

African American educator and Religious Sister

- Born: 1805
- Died: December 1833 (aged 27–28); Baltimore
- Burial place: Baltimore's Old Cathedral Cemetery
- Other names: Sister Aloysius, O.S.P.
- Occupation: Teacher

Anne Marie Becraft, also known as Sister Aloysius, O.S.P. (1805 – December 16, 1833) was an African American educator and Religious Sister. Around 1820, she established a school for black girls in Washington, D.C., and later joined the Oblate Sisters of Providence.

== Biography ==
=== Early life and education ===
Becraft (sources also refer to her as Maria or Marie Becraft) was born in 1805 to William and Sara Becraft, prominent free Black Catholics.

Anne Marie's grandmother, also a free Black, worked as a housekeeper for Charles Carroll (the only Catholic signer of the Declaration of Independence) and was likely his concubine; Carroll presented Annie Marie's father with several of the Carroll family's prized relics, paintings, and other keepsakes just before Carroll's death in 1832.

The oldest of seven children, Anne Marie began her formal education at the age of four at the White-operated Potter School in Washington, D.C. Race hostilities forced her to leave the school in 1812. Becraft continued her studies at another White-operated school, New Georgetown, until 1820, when it closed because White involvement in the education of black people was discouraged.

At 15, Becraft became the proprietor of a day school for girls. The school operated from a house on Dunbarton Street in Georgetown. There was an average of 35 girls who "comprised girls from the best colored families of Georgetown, Washington, Alexandria, and surrounding counties." The school became known as the Georgetown Seminary and operated as an academy for boarders and day students, one of the first for females in the District. Becraft operated the school for eight years, at which point she resigned and moved to Baltimore in 1831 to join the Oblate Sisters of Providence in Baltimore, the first Catholic religious order for women of African descent. The school continued under the direction of Ellen Simonds.

=== Religious life ===
On September 8, 1832, Becraft received the religious name Aloysius (some sources say Aloyons). The following year she took her vows and became the 11th sister to join the Oblates. She was a teaching oblate who instructed her students in arithmetic, English and embroidery.

=== Death ===
From the age of 15, Becraft had had a chronic chest condition. In 1833 her condition worsened and she was admitted to the Oblates' infirmary. She died on December 16, 1833, aged 28. Becraft was buried in Baltimore's Old Cathedral Cemetery.

== Legacy ==
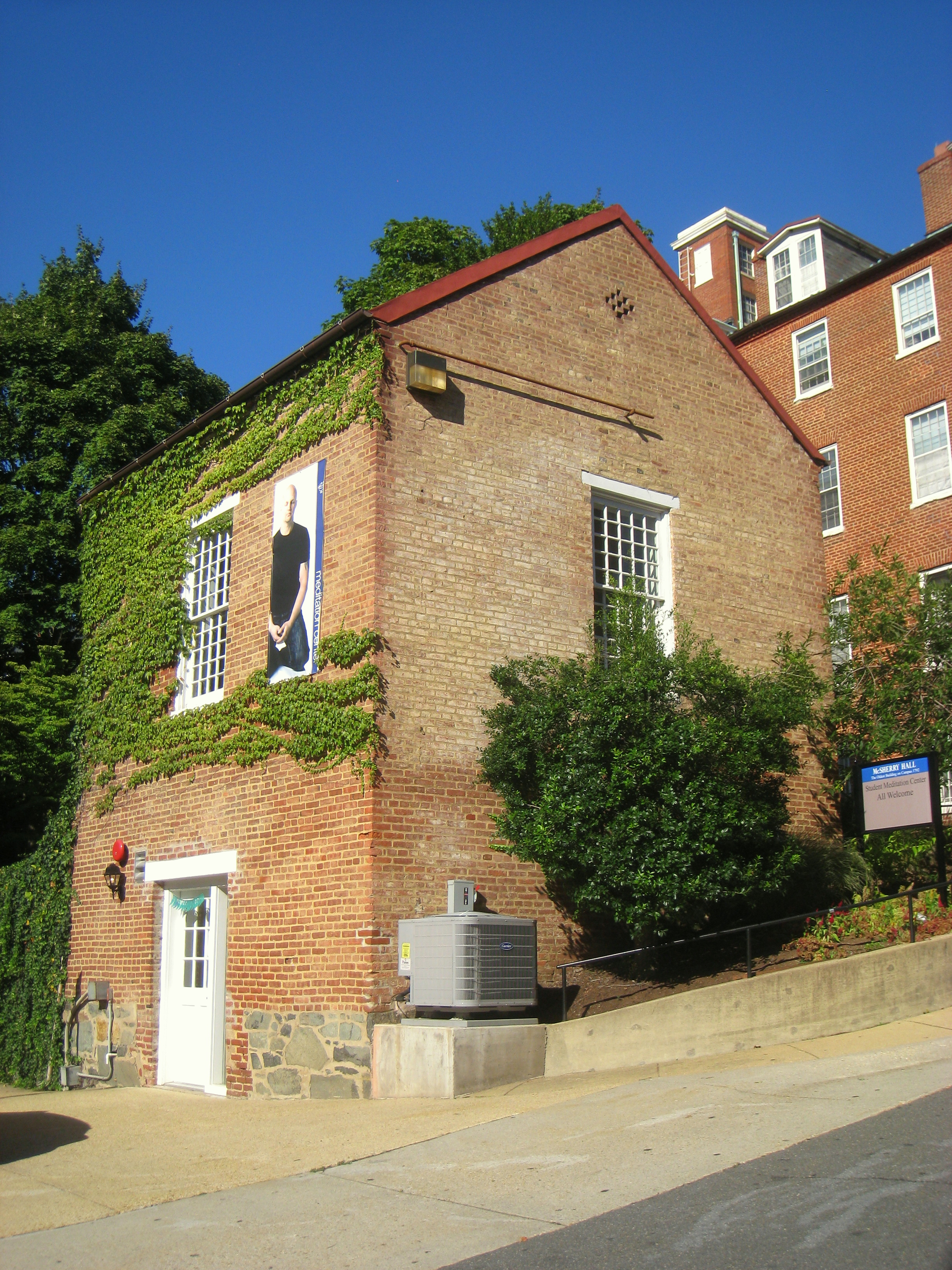
Anne Marie Becraft Hall, 2010

On April 18, 2017, Georgetown University renamed Remembrance Hall after Becraft. The building was originally named for Fr. William McSherry, who played a role in the 1838 Jesuit slave sale. The dedication of Anne Marie Becraft Hall was attended by Georgetown president John DeGioia, current students and administrators, and descendants of Becraft. Anne Marie Becraft Hall is the first building at Georgetown University to be named after an African-American woman.

Marcia Chatelain, associate professor of history and African American studies and a member of the Georgetown University Working Group on Slavery, Memory, and Reconciliation, described Becraft as "a devout Catholic and deeply committed to educating young girls of color in the nation's capital. Though she experienced both anti-Catholic and anti-black intimidation, she nevertheless responded to her calling to teach and to serve God."

The 1870 "Condition and Improvement of Public Schools in the District of Columbia" stated that Becraft "is remembered, wherever she was known, as a woman of the rarest sweetness and exaltation of Christian life, graceful and attractive in person and manners, gifted, well educated, and wholly devoted to doing good."
