= SS Charles Carroll =

Liberty ship of WWII

History

United States
- Name: Charles Carroll
- Namesake: Charles Carroll
- Owner: War Shipping Administration (WSA)
- Operator: American Export Lines Inc.
- Ordered: as type (EC2-S-C1) hull, MCE hull 15
- Awarded: 14 March 1941
- Builder: Bethlehem-Fairfield Shipyard, Baltimore, Maryland
- Cost: $1,545,574
- Yard number: 2002
- Way number: 2
- Laid down: 15 May 1941
- Launched: 25 October 1941
- Completed: 19 January 1942
- Identification: Call sign: KKZK
- Fate: Laid up in the Hudson River Reserve Fleet, Jones Point, New York, 26 April 1946; Sold for scrapping, 3 September 1970, withdrawn from fleet, 4 December 1970

General characteristics
- Class & type: Liberty ship; type EC2-S-C1, standard
- Tonnage: 10,865 LT DWT; 7,176 GRT
- Displacement: 3,380 long tons (3,434 t) (light); 14,245 long tons (14,474 t) (max)
- Length: 441 feet 6 inches (135 m) oa; 416 feet (127 m) pp; 427 feet (130 m) lwl
- Beam: 57 feet (17 m)
- Draft: 27 ft 9.25 in (8.4646 m)
- Installed power: 2 × Oil fired 450 °F (232 °C) boilers, operating at 220 psi (1,500 kPa); 2,500 hp (1,900 kW)
- Propulsion: 1 × triple-expansion steam engine, (manufactured by General Machinery Corp., Hamilton, Ohio); 1 × screw propeller
- Speed: 11.5 knots (21.3 km/h; 13.2 mph)
- Capacity: 562,608 cubic feet (15,931 m^{3}) (grain); 499,573 cubic feet (14,146 m^{3}) (bale)
- Complement: 38–62 USMM; 21–40 USNAG
- Armament: Varied by ship; Bow-mounted 3-inch (76 mm)/50-caliber gun; Stern-mounted 4-inch (102 mm)/50-caliber gun; 2–8 × single 20-millimeter (0.79 in) Oerlikon anti-aircraft (AA) cannons and/or, 2–8 × 37-millimeter (1.46 in) M1 AA guns

SS Charles Carroll was a Liberty ship built in the United States during World War II. She was named after Charles Carroll, a wealthy Maryland planter and an early advocate of independence from the Kingdom of Great Britain and one of the signers of the United States Declaration of Independence. He is one of the Founding Fathers of the United States and served as a delegate to the Continental Congress and Confederation Congress. Carroll later served as the first United States Senator for Maryland. He was the last surviving signatory of the Declaration of Independence.

== Construction ==
Charles Carroll was laid down on 15 May 1941, under a Maritime Commission (MARCOM) contract, MCE hull 15, by the Bethlehem-Fairfield Shipyard, Baltimore, Maryland; and was launched on 25 October 1941.

== History ==
Charles Carroll was allocated to American Export Lines, on 19 January 1942. On 26 April 1946, she was laid up in the Hudson River Reserve Fleet, Jones Point, New York. On 12 May 1953, Charles Carroll was withdrawn from the fleet to be loaded with grain under the "Grain Program 1953", she returned loaded on 25 May 1953. On 20 May 1956, she was withdrawn to be unload, she returned reloaded with grain 9 June 1956. On 27 April 1963, she was withdrawn from the fleet to be unloaded, she returned empty on 4 May 1963. Charles Carroll was sold for scrapping on 3 September 1970, to Union Minerals & Alloys Corp. She was removed from the fleet, 4 December 1970.

== Bibliography ==
- "Bethlehem-Fairfield, Baltimore MD". www.ShipbuildingHistory.com. 14 August 2008.
- Maritime Administration. "Charles Carroll". Ship History Database Vessel Status Card. U.S. Department of Transportation, Maritime Administration.
- Davies, James (May 2004). "Specifications (As-Built)" (PDF). p. 23.
- "SS Charles Carroll".
