= Charles Carroll (British Army officer) =

British soldier

Brigadier Charles Samuel Flanagan Carroll, OBE, MC (30 January 1923 - 1992) was a British soldier of the Brigade of Gurkhas who led a bayonet charge of a Japanese position during the Second World War and fought communist insurgents in the jungle during the Malayan Emergency.

== Early life ==
Charles Samuel Flanagan Carroll was born in Calcutta on 30 January 1923. He was educated at Lawrence College Ghora Gali.

== Military career ==
Carroll was commissioned into the Indian Army in 1942 and served first, as was customary, in a British regiment, the Worcesters. He then joined the 4th Battalion of the 6th Gurkhas and went to Burma in 1944 as commander of C company. In 1945 he earned a Military Cross in Burma when he led a bayonet charge at Mindegon, near Mandalay. After the end of the Second World War, he became adjutant of the 1st Gurkha Battalion. He then went to Malaya to fight communist insurgents in the jungle and was mentioned in dispatches. He had various staff appointments, was appointed an OBE in 1966, and lastly commanded the Aldershot Garrison before his retirement from the army in 1978.

== Family ==
Carroll married Priscilla Puckle, sister of the actress Beth Rogan. They had two sons.

== Later life ==
After his retirement, Carroll was house governor of the Phyllis Tuckwell Hospice in Farnham and did work for the Citizens' Advice Bureau in Haslemere. He died in 1992 and was survived by his wife and sons.
