= Charles Carroll High School =

Public school in Philadelphia, Pennsylvania, US

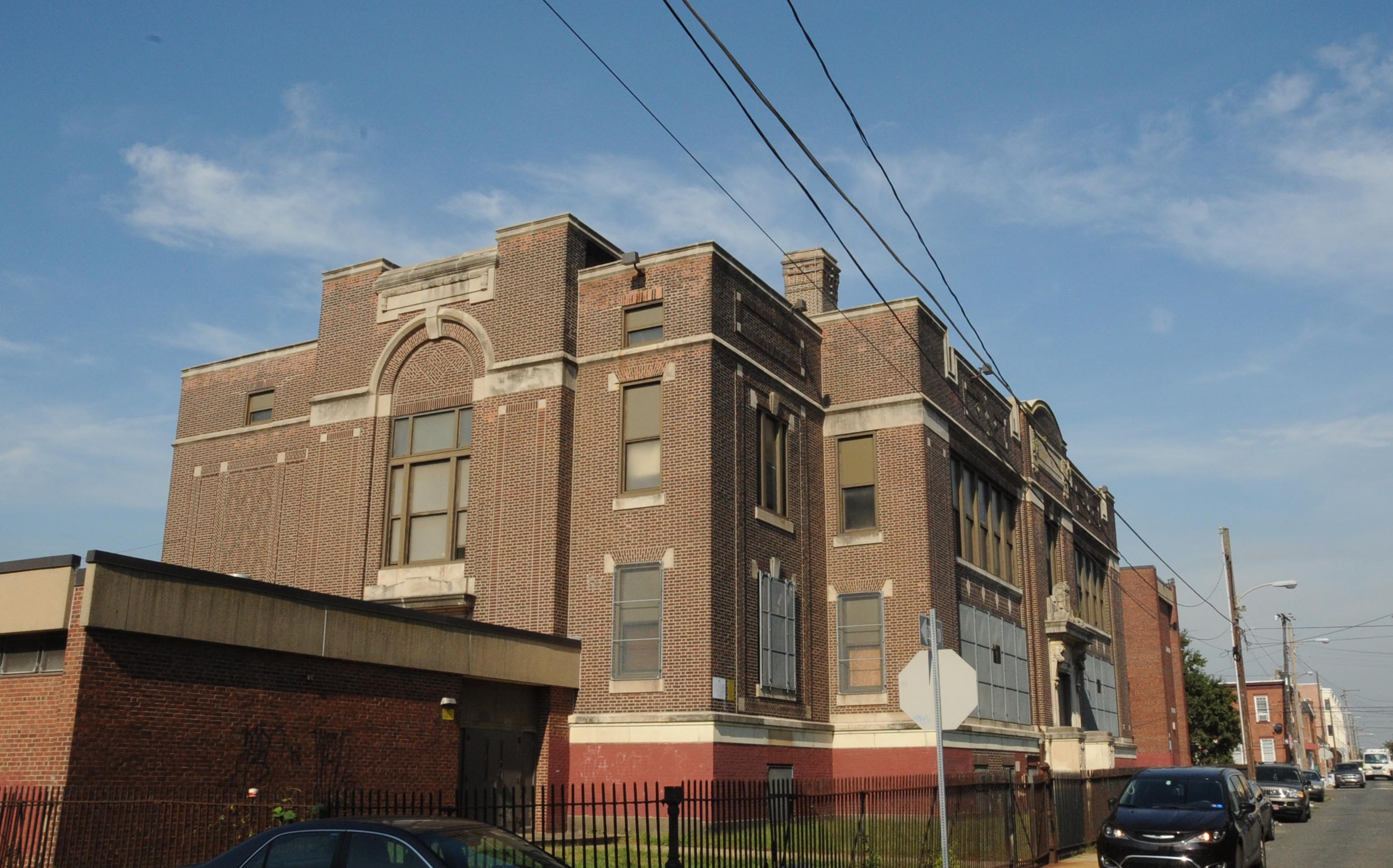

Location
- 2700 E Auburn Street, Philadelphia, Pennsylvania, 19134, United States; 39.9796°N 75.1104°W

Information
- Type: Public
- Closed: 2013
- School district: The School District of Philadelphia
- Principal: Joyce Hoog
- Enrollment: 416
- Website: Charles Carroll High School

Charles Carroll High School was a public high school located in the Port Richmond section of Philadelphia, Pennsylvania, United States. Its student body was mostly white, black, and latino.

The school was closed in 2013 as part of Philadelphia's shutdown of 23 district-run schools. Displaced students were enrolled in Penn Treaty, Kensington International Business High School, Kensington Health Sciences Academy, and Kensington Urban Education Academy.

== Feeder patterns ==
Feeder K–8 schools included:

- Bache-Martin
- General Philip Kearny
- Spring Garden
- Laura Wheeler Waring

== School uniforms ==
Beginning Fall 2000, the Philadelphia Board of Education required all Philadelphia public school students, including those at Charles Carroll High School, to wear school uniforms, which consisted of gray-collared shirts and navy blue pants.
