= Charles Carroll of Carrollton =

American Founding Father, politician, and planter (1737–1832)

Charles Carroll
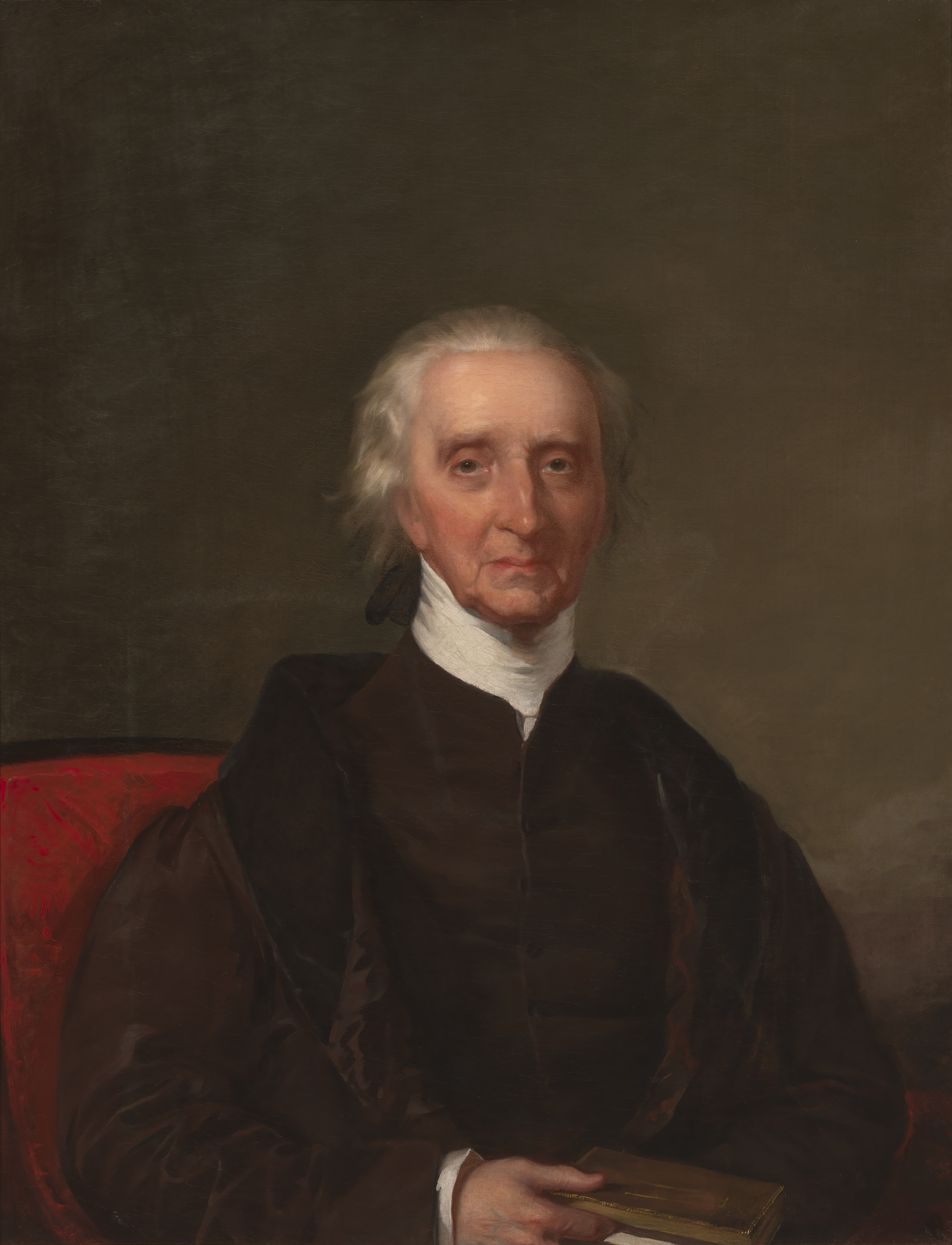
- Portrait by Chester Harding, 1830

United States Senator from Maryland
- In office March 4, 1789 – November 30, 1792
- Preceded by: Seat created
- Succeeded by: Richard Potts

Delegate to the Second Continental Congress from Maryland
- In office 1776–1778

Member of the Maryland Senate
- In office 1781–1800

Personal details
- Born: September 19, 1737 Annapolis, Maryland, British America
- Died: November 14, 1832 (aged 95) Baltimore, Maryland, U.S.
- Party: Federalist
- Spouse: Mary Darnall
- Relations: Charles Carroll of Annapolis (father); Charles Carroll the Settler (grandfather); Charles Carroll (cousin); Daniel Carroll (cousin); John Carroll (cousin)
- Education: College of St. Omer; Lycée Louis-le-Grand

Charles Carroll (September 19, 1737 – November 14, 1832), known as Charles Carroll of Carrollton or Charles Carroll III, was an American politician, planter, and signatory of the Declaration of Independence. He was the only Catholic signatory of the Declaration as well as the last surviving and longest-lived, dying 56 years after its signing at the age of 95.

A Founding Father of the United States, Carroll was known contemporaneously as the "First Citizen" of the American colonies, a consequence of signing articles in the Maryland Gazette with that pen name. He served as a delegate to the Continental Congress and Confederation Congress. Carroll later served as the first United States Senator for Maryland. Of all of the signers of the Declaration of Independence, Carroll was one of the wealthiest and most formally educated. A product of his 17-year Jesuit education in France, Carroll spoke five languages fluently.

Born in Annapolis, Maryland, Carroll inherited vast agricultural estates and was regarded as the wealthiest man in the American colonies when the American Revolution commenced in 1775. His personal fortune at this time was reputed to be 2,100,000 pounds sterling, the equivalent to £293,304,979 in 2025 (US$375 million). In addition, Carroll presided over his manor in Maryland, a 10,000-acre estate, and claimed as his property approximately 300 slaves. Though barred from holding office in Maryland because of his religion, Carroll emerged as a leader of the state's movement for independence. He was a delegate to the Annapolis Convention and was selected as a delegate to the Continental Congress in 1776. He was part of an unsuccessful diplomatic mission, which also included Benjamin Franklin and Samuel Chase, that Congress sent to Quebec in hopes of winning the support of French Canadians.

Carroll served in the Maryland Senate from 1781 to 1800. He was elected as one of Maryland's inaugural representatives in the United States Senate but resigned his seat in 1792 after Maryland passed a law barring individuals from simultaneously serving in both state and federal office. After retiring from public service, he helped establish the Baltimore and Ohio Railroad by purchasing $40,000 of state-backed securities and serving on its first board of directors.

== Ancestry ==
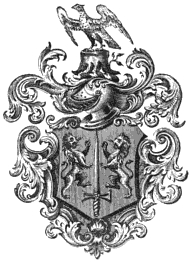
The Carroll family's coat of arms

The Carroll family were descendants of the Ó Cearbhaill's, who were the rulers of the Irish petty kingdom of Éile in King's County, Ireland. Carroll's grandfather was Charles Carroll the Settler, an Irishman from Aghagurty who moved to London in 1685 and worked as a clerk for English nobleman Lord Powis before emigrating to Maryland in October 1688. After arriving in Maryland, he settled in the colonial capital of St. Mary's City with a commission as an attorney general from the colony's proprietor, Lord Baltimore.

Carroll's maternal ancestry was English, as his mother hailed from the Brooke family.

Carroll's father was Charles Carroll of Annapolis, who was born in Annapolis, Maryland, in 1702. Though he inherited the plantation of Doughoregan Manor from his father, as a Roman Catholic he was forbidden from participating in the political affairs of the colony.

== Early life ==
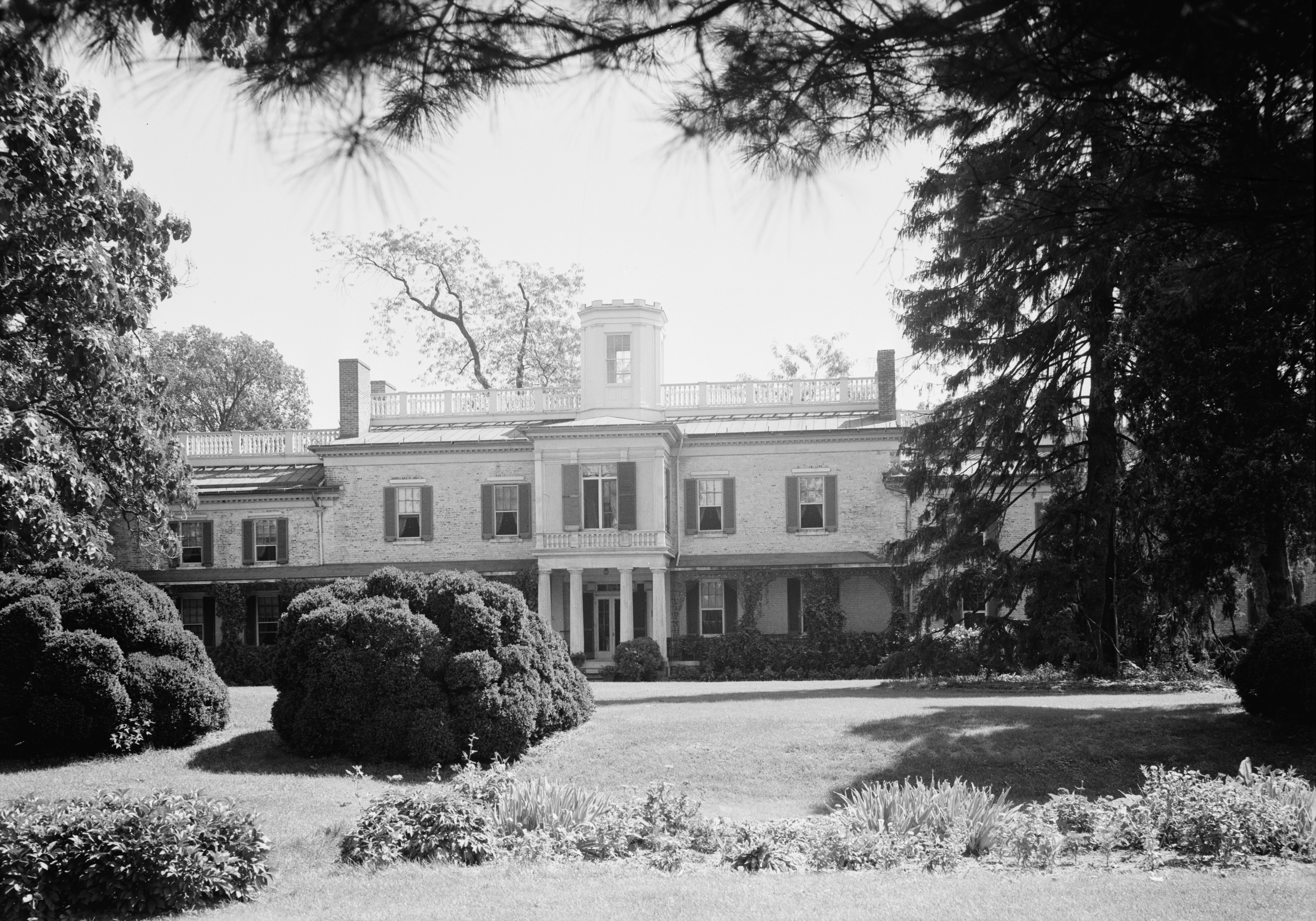
Doughoregan Manor, the Carroll family seat, now a National Historic Landmark

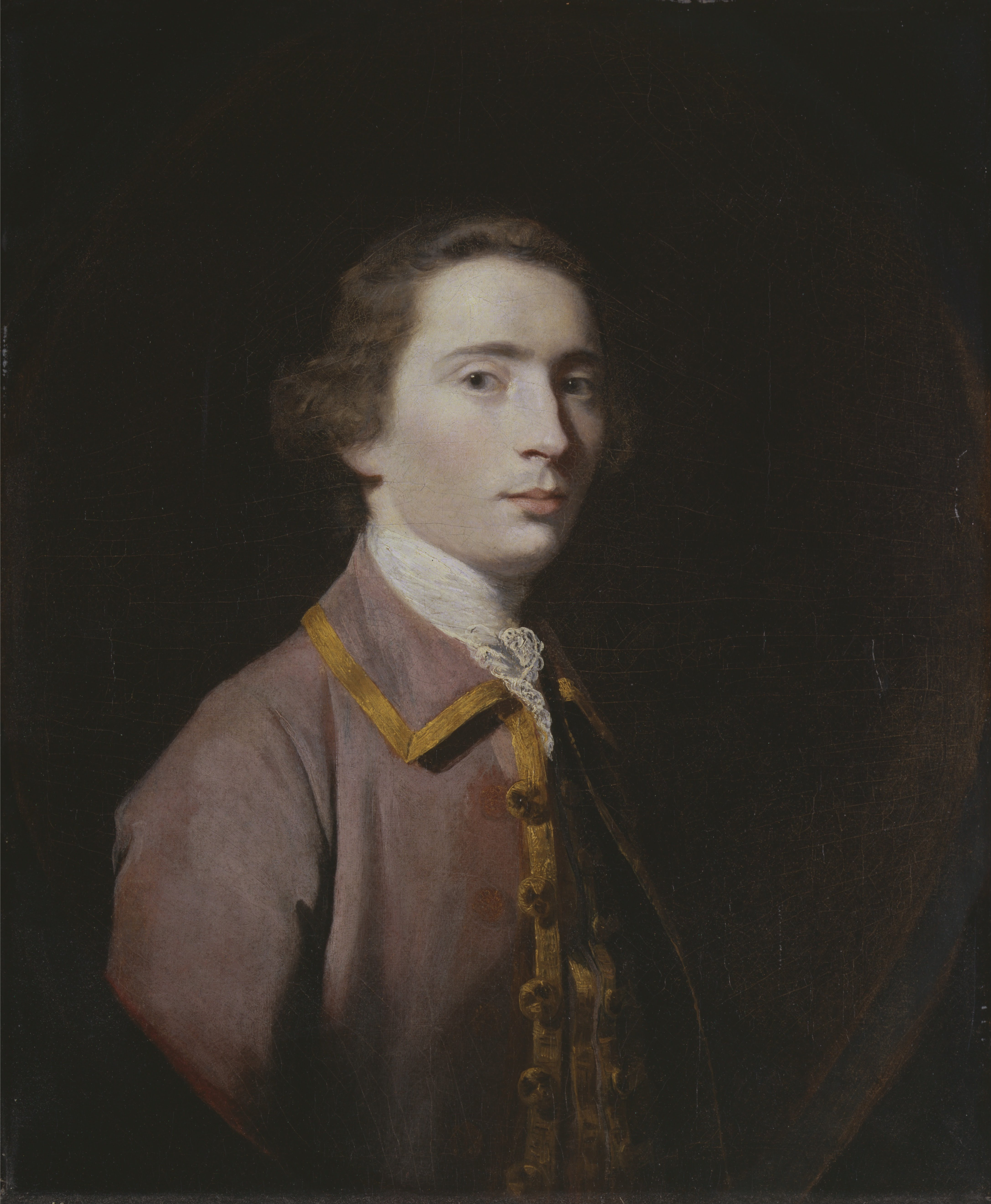
Charles Carroll of Carrollton Portrait by Sir Joshua Reynolds, c. 1763 Yale Center for British Art

Carroll was born on September 19, 1737, in Annapolis, Maryland, the only child of Charles Carroll of Annapolis and his wife Elizabeth Brooke. He was born an illegitimate child, as his parents were not married at the time of his birth, for technical reasons to do with the inheritance of the Carroll family estates. They eventually married in 1757. The young Carroll was educated at a Jesuit preparatory school known as Bohemia Manor in Cecil County on Maryland's Eastern Shore. At age 11, he was sent to France, where he continued in Jesuit schools, first at the College of St. Omer in Northern France and later the Lycée Louis-le-Grand in Paris, graduating in 1755. He continued his studies in Europe and read law in London before returning to Annapolis in 1765.

Charles Carroll of Annapolis granted Carrollton Manor to his son, Charles Carroll of Carrollton. It is from this tract of land that he took his title "Charles Carroll of Carrollton." Like his father, Carroll was a Catholic and as a consequence was barred by Maryland statute from entering politics, practicing law and voting. This did not prevent him from becoming one of the wealthiest men in Maryland (or indeed anywhere in the Colonies), owning extensive agricultural estates, most notably the large manor at Doughoregan, Hockley Forge and Mill, and providing capital to finance new enterprises on the Western Shore.

== American Revolution ==
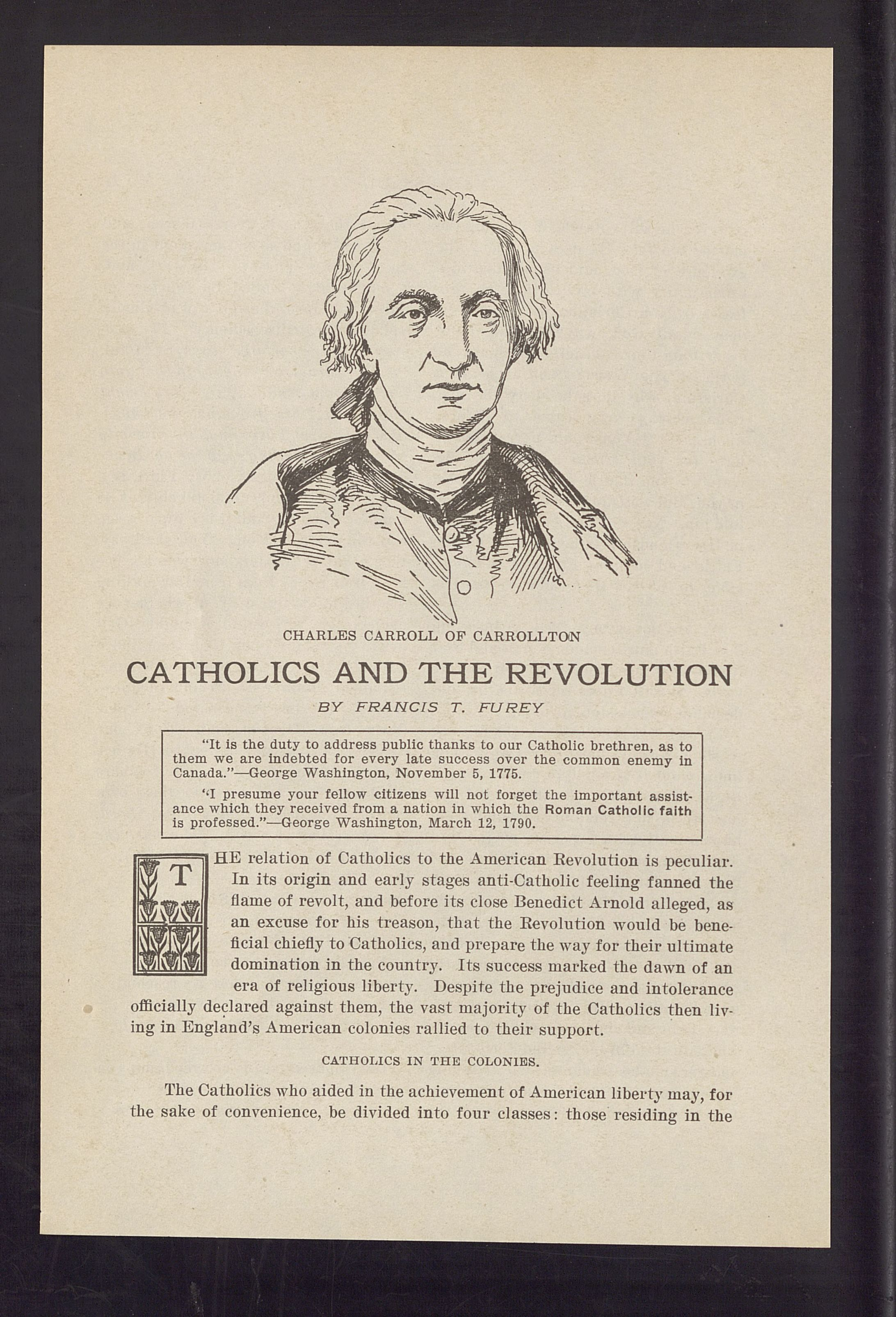
Charles Carroll of Carrollton: Catholics and the Revolution, from My Message, Official Organ of the Diocese of St. Cloud (St. Cloud, Minnesota), Volume 1, Number 7.

=== Voice for independence ===
Carroll was not initially interested in politics, and in any event Catholics had been barred from holding office in Maryland since the 1704 act seeking "to prevent the growth of Popery in this Province". But as the dispute between Great Britain and her American colonies intensified in the early 1770s, Carroll became a powerful voice for independence. In 1772, he engaged in a debate, conducted through anonymous newspaper letters, maintaining the right of the colonies to control their own taxation. Writing in the Maryland Gazette under the pseudonym "First Citizen," he also criticized the royal governor's proclamation that increased special fees paid by colonists to state officials and Protestant clergy. Opposing Carroll in these written debates, using the name "Antillon", was Daniel Dulany the Younger, a noted lawyer and Loyalist politician. In these debates, Carroll argued that the government of Maryland had long been the monopoly of four families, the Ogles, the Taskers, the Bladens and the Dulanys, with Dulany taking the contrary view. Eventually word spread of the true identity of the two combatants, and Carroll's fame and notoriety began to grow. Dulany soon resorted to highly personal ad hominem attacks on "First Citizen", and Carroll responded, in statesmanlike fashion, with considerable restraint, arguing that when "Antillon" engaged in "virulent invective and illiberal abuse, we may fairly presume, that arguments are either wanting, or that ignorance or incapacity know not how to apply them". Following these written debates, Carroll became a leading opponent of British rule and served on various committees of correspondence.

In the early 1770s, Carroll appears to have embraced the idea that only war could break the impasse with Great Britain. According to legend, Carroll and Samuel Chase (who would also later sign the Declaration of Independence on Maryland's behalf) had the following exchange:

Chase: "We have the better of our opponents; we have completely written them down."
Carroll: "And do you think that writing will settle the question between us?"
Chase: "To be sure, what else can we resort to?"
Carroll: "The bayonet. Our arguments will only raise the feelings of the people to that pitch when open war will be looked to as the arbiter of the dispute."

=== Continental Congress ===
Beginning with his election to Maryland's committee of correspondence in 1774, Carroll represented the colony in most of the pre-revolutionary groups. He became a member of Annapolis' first committee of safety, known as the "Annapolis Committee of Correspondence and Council Safety" in 1775. Carroll was a delegate to the Annapolis Convention, which functioned as Maryland's revolutionary government before the Declaration of Independence. In early 1776, the Congress sent him on a four-man diplomatic mission to the Province of Quebec, in order to seek assistance from French Canadians in the coming confrontation with Great Britain. Carroll was an excellent choice for such a mission, being fluent in French and a Catholic and therefore well suited to negotiations with the French-speaking Catholics of Quebec. He was joined in the commission by Benjamin Franklin, Samuel Chase, and his cousin John Carroll. The commission did not accomplish its mission.

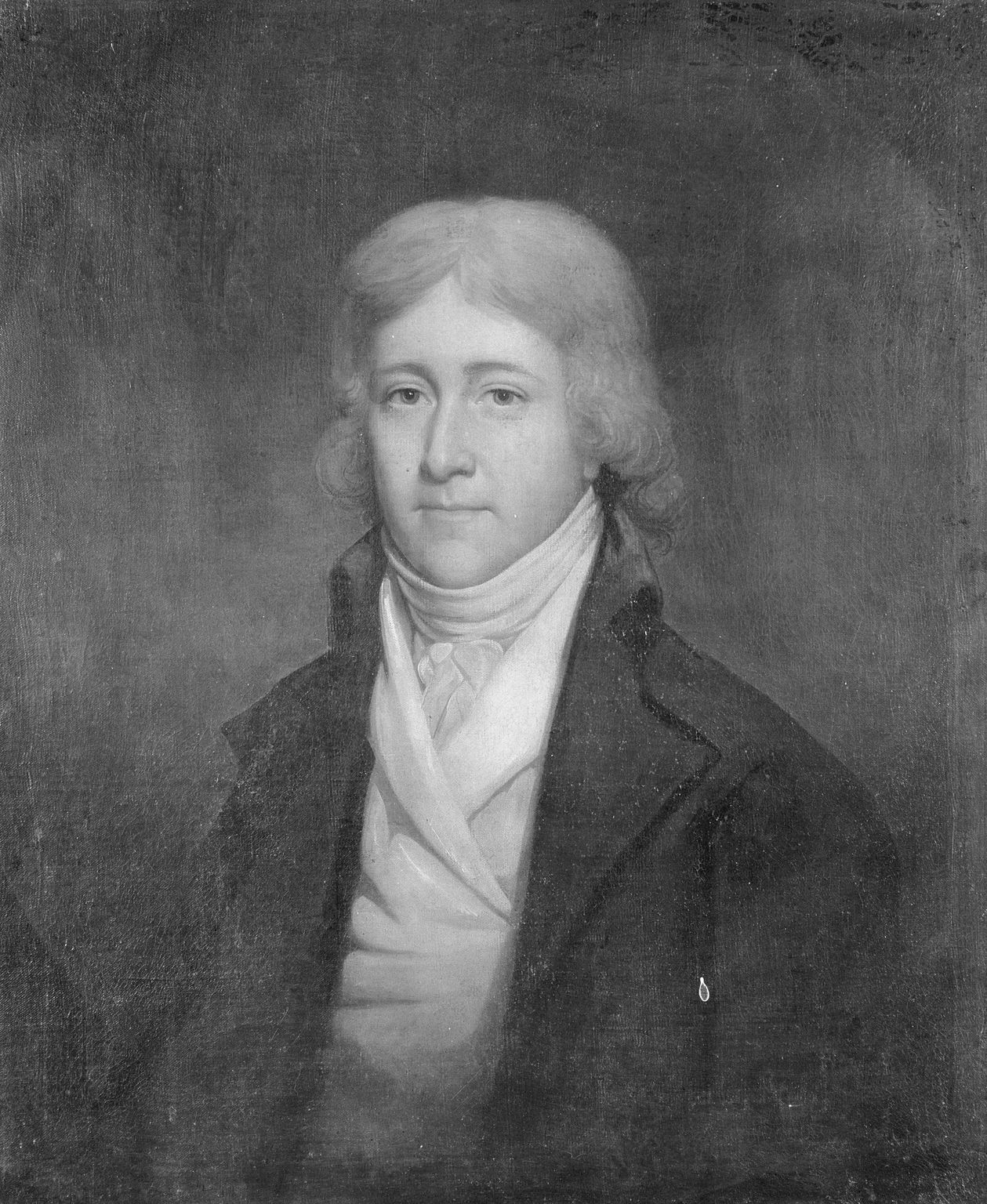
Charles Carroll of Homewood

Carroll was elected as a Maryland representative to the Continental Congress on July 4, 1776, and remained a delegate until 1778. He arrived at the 2nd Continental Congress too late to vote in favor of the Declaration of Independence but was present to sign the official document that survives today. He signed the document in Philadelphia on August 2, 1776. After both Thomas Jefferson and John Adams died on July 4, 1826, Carroll became the last living signatory of the Declaration of Independence. His signature reads "Charles Carroll of Carrollton" to distinguish him from his father, "Charles Carroll of Annapolis," who was still living at that time, and several other Charles Carrolls in Maryland, such as Charles Carroll, Barrister, and his son Charles Carroll Jr., also known as "Charles Carroll of Homewood." He is usually referred to this way by historians. At the time, he was the richest man in America and had much to lose by identifying himself on the document. Throughout his term in the Second Continental Congress, he served on the board of war. Carroll also gave considerable financial support to the American Revolutionary War.

== Post-revolution political career ==
Carroll returned to Maryland in 1778 to assist in the formation of a state government. Carroll was re-elected to the Continental Congress in 1780, but he declined to take his seat. Instead, he accepted election to the Maryland Senate in 1781 and served there until 1800. In November 1779, the Maryland House of Delegates moved to pass a bill authorizing the confiscation of property from those who would not renounce their allegiance to England, without any right to a legal hearing or remedy. Carroll opposed this measure, questioning the motives of those who pressed for confiscation and arguing that the measure was unjust. However, such moves to confiscate Tory property had much popular support and eventually, in 1780, the measure passed.

When the United States government was created, the Maryland legislature elected him to the first session of the United States Senate. In 1792, Maryland passed a law that prohibited any man from serving in the state and national legislatures at the same time. Since Carroll was more interested in matters concerning his home state, he resigned from the U.S. Senate on November 30, 1792.

== Attitude toward slavery ==
The Carroll family were slaveholders and Carroll was reputedly the largest single slave owner at the time of the American Revolution. Carroll was opposed in principle to slavery, asking rhetorically: "Why keep alive the question of slavery? It is admitted by all to be a great evil.; let an effectual mode of getting rid of it be pointed out, or let the question sleep forever;" However, although he supported its gradual abolition, he did not free his own slaves. Carroll introduced a bill for the gradual abolition of slavery in the Maryland Senate, but it did not pass. In 1828, aged 91, he served as president of the Auxiliary State Colonization Society of Maryland, the Maryland branch of the American Colonization Society, an organization dedicated to returning Black Americans to lead free lives in African states such as Liberia.

== Later life ==
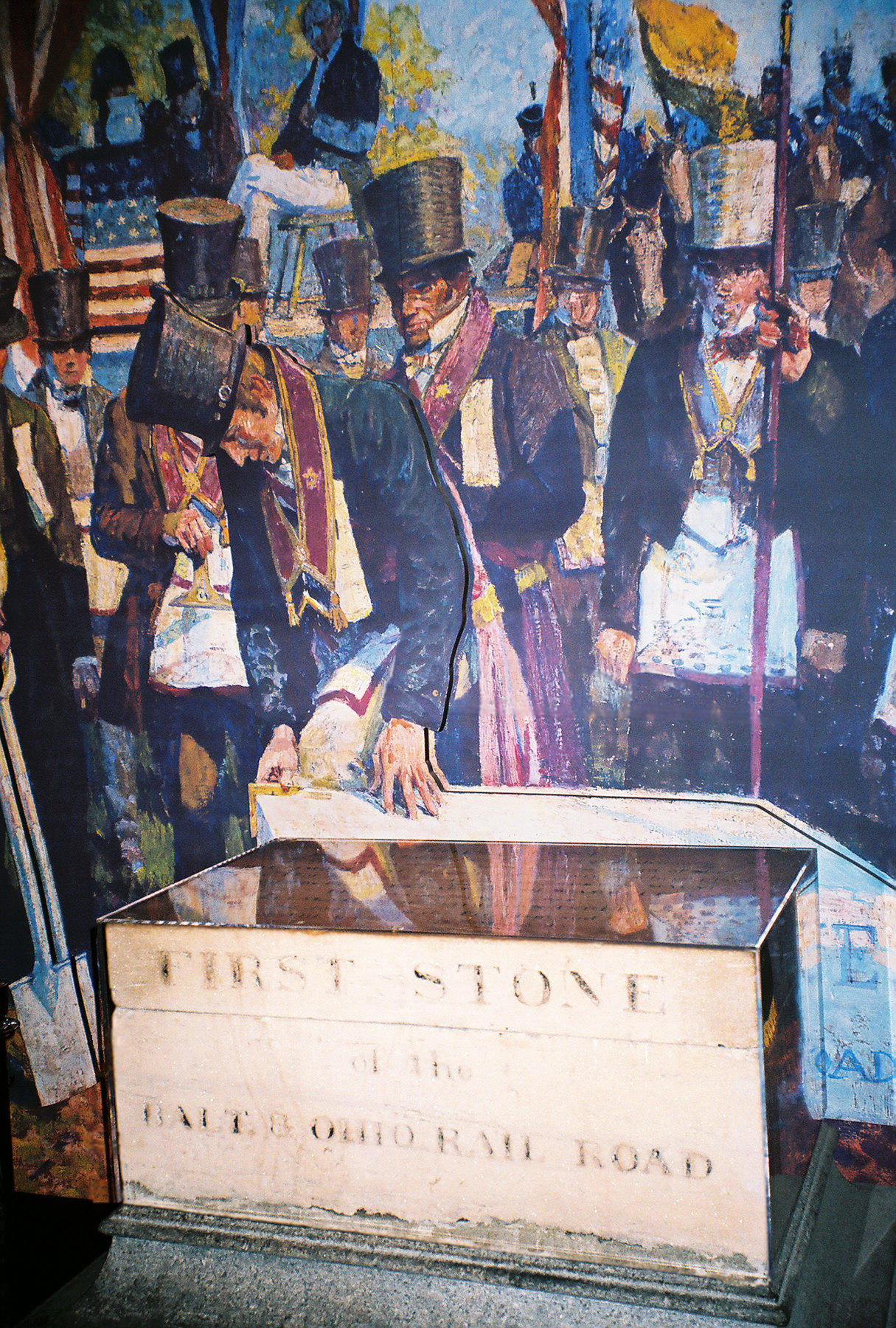
"First Stone" (cornerstone) of the Baltimore and Ohio Railroad laid by Carroll on July 4, 1828, now displayed at the National Museum of Railroad History & Innovation

Carroll retired from public life in 1801. After Thomas Jefferson became president, he had great anxiety about political activity and was not sympathetic to the War of 1812. He was elected a member of the American Antiquarian Society in 1815. Carroll came out of retirement to help create the Baltimore and Ohio Railroad in 1827.

In 1828, he commissioned the Phoenix Shot Tower in Baltimore and laid its cornerstone. The 234-foot tower, which is still standing, was the tallest structure in the United States until the Washington Monument was built. Carroll's last public act, on July 4, 1828, was the laying of the "first stone" (cornerstone) of the railroad at almost 91 years of age. "The Carrollton March", written in his honor to celebrate the occasion, is recognized as the first train song.

Carroll was admitted as an honorary member of The Society of the Cincinnati in the state of Maryland in 1828. Unlike hereditary members, honorary members are not eligible to be represented by a living descendant. In May 1832, he was asked to appear at the first Democratic Party Convention but did not attend on account of poor health. Carroll died on November 14, 1832, at age 95, in Baltimore, at the Caton home.

He holds the distinction of being the oldest-lived Founding Father. He had outlived four of the first five U.S. presidents. His funeral took place at the Baltimore Cathedral (now known as the Basilica of the National Shrine of the Assumption of the Blessed Virgin Mary). Carroll was buried in his Doughoregan Manor Chapel at Ellicott City, Maryland after a national day of mourning.

== Legacy ==
Carroll is remembered in the third stanza of the former state song Maryland, My Maryland.

Thou wilt not cower in the dust,
Maryland! My Maryland!
Thy beaming sword shall never rust,
Maryland! My Maryland!
Remember Carroll's sacred trust,
Remember Howard's warlike thrust –
And all thy slumberers with the just,
Maryland! My Maryland!

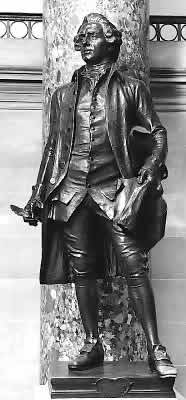
The bronze statue by Richard E. Brooks located in the United States Capitol crypt

Named in his honor are counties in Arkansas, Georgia, Illinois, Indiana, Iowa, Kentucky, Maryland, Mississippi, Missouri, New Hampshire, Ohio, and Virginia as well as two Louisiana parishes, East and West Carroll. Cities and towns named for him are in Alabama, Georgia, Kentucky, Illinois (Mount Carroll, Illinois), Iowa, Maryland, Missouri, New Hampshire, and New York, as well as neighborhoods in Brooklyn and Tampa. Charles Carroll Middle School in New Carrollton, Maryland; Charles Carroll High School in the Port Richmond neighborhood of Philadelphia; and Carroll University in Waukesha, Wisconsin, are named in his honor.

In 1876, the Centennial Exhibition held to commemorate the birth of the United States was held in Philadelphia. The Catholic Abstinence Union of America commissioned the Catholic Total Abstinence Union Fountain for the Centennial Exhibition. The fountain was commissioned and created by sculptor Herman Kim to promote American morality, and the centerpiece of the fountain is a statue of Moses. There are four other statues that surround it, making up the points of the Maltese cross: Carroll, Father Mathew, Commodore John Barry, and Archbishop John Carroll. The fountain is located in West Fairmount Park.

In 1903, the state of Maryland added a bronze statue of Carroll to the United States Capitol's National Statuary Hall Collection. Sculpted by Richard E. Brooks, it is located in the Crypt. In 1906, the University of Notre Dame constructed a residence hall known as Carroll Hall. Paca-Carroll House at St. John's College is named for Carroll and his fellow signer of the Declaration of Independence, William Paca. The World War II Liberty Ship SS Charles Carroll was named in his honor.

Carroll is depicted in the 2004 film National Treasure.

== Family ==
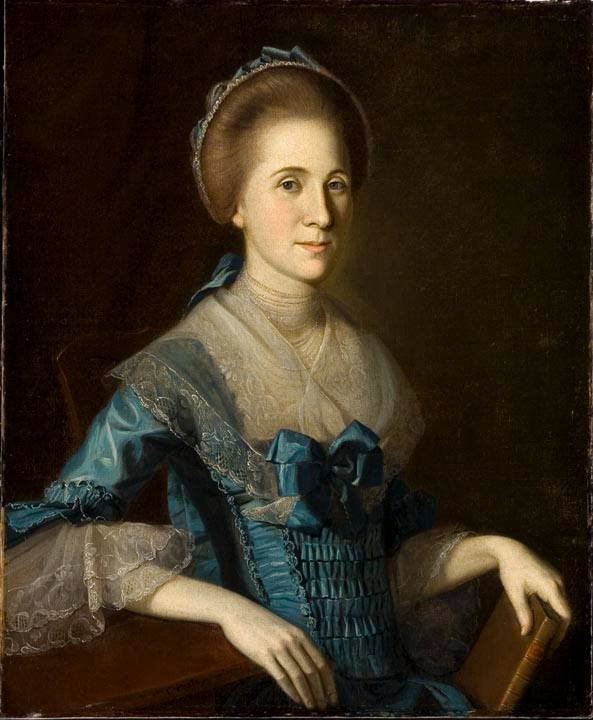
Mary Darnall Carroll (1749–1782), portrait by Charles Willson Peale

Carroll married Mary Darnall (1749–1782), known as Molly, on June 5, 1768. She was a granddaughter of Henry Darnall (Carroll was a great-grandson of Darnall). They had seven children before Molly died in 1782, but only three survived infancy:

- Mary Carroll (1770–1846), who married Richard Caton (1763–1845), an English immigrant who became a Baltimore merchant. From 1820 to 1832, Carroll would winter with the Catons in Baltimore. Their daughters were:
  - Marianne Caton (1788–1853), who married Robert Patterson (brother of Elizabeth Patterson Bonaparte). After his death, she married Anglo-Irish statesman Richard Wellesley, 1st Marquess Wellesley (1760–1842), then the Lord Lieutenant of Ireland, who was the brother of the legendary military commander Arthur Wellesley, 1st Duke of Wellington, who was believed to have been previously Marianne's paramour.
  - Elizabeth Caton (1790–1862), who married George Stafford-Jerningham, 8th Baron Stafford.
  - Louisa Caton (1793–1874), who married Col. Sir Felton Bathurst-Hervey, 1st Baronet. After his death, she married Francis D'Arcy-Osborne, Marquess of Carmarthen (later the 7th Duke of Leeds).
  - Emily Caton (1794/5-1867), who married John McTavish (1788–1852), who served as British Consul to Baltimore. They were parents of four children including Mary Wellesley McTavish (1826–1915), The Hon. Mrs Henry George Howard (of the Earls of Carlisle).
- Charles Carroll Jr. (1775–1825) (sometimes known as Charles Carroll of Homewood because he oversaw its design and construction), married Harriet Chew (1775–1861) from Philadelphia. Harriet was the daughter of Benjamin Chew, the chief justice of Pennsylvania, and her sister married John Eager Howard, who had served in the Senate with Charles Carroll of Carrollton. Charles Jr. reportedly consumed up to two quarts of brandy a day. This led to erratic behavior that resulted in his separation from Harriet.
- Catherine ("Kitty") Carroll (1778–1861), who married Robert Goodloe Harper (1765–1826), a lawyer and U.S. senator.

Today, Carroll's descendants continue to own Doughoregan Manor, the largest parcel of land in Howard County, Maryland, with over 1,000 acres (4 km^{2}) of valuable but historically preserved land in Ellicott City, Maryland.

Anne Marie Becraft's grandmother, a free Black woman, worked as a housekeeper for Carroll. Carroll presented Anne Marie's father with several of the Carroll family's prized relics, paintings, and other keepsakes just before Carroll's death in 1832.

== Carroll's signature ==
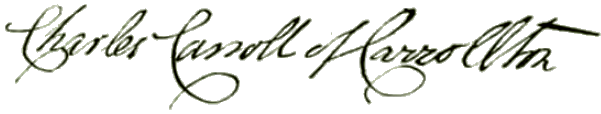

In the 1940s, newspaper journalist John Hix's syndicated comic Strange as It Seems published an apocryphal explanation for Charles Carroll's distinctive signature on the Declaration of Independence. Every member of the Continental Congress who signed this document automatically became a criminal, guilty of sedition against King George III. Carroll, because of his wealth, had more to lose than most of his companions. Some of the signators, such as Caesar Rodney and Button Gwinnett, had unusual and distinctive names which would clearly identify them to the King; other signators, with more commonplace names, might hope to sign the Declaration without incriminating themselves.

According to Hix, when it was Carroll's turn to sign the Declaration of Independence, he rose, went to John Hancock's desk where the document rested, signed his name "Charles Carroll" and returned to his seat. At this point another member of the Continental Congress, who was prejudiced against Carroll because of his Catholicism, commented that Carroll risked nothing in signing the document, as there must be many men named Charles Carroll in the colonies, and so the King would be unlikely to order Carroll's arrest without clear proof that he was the same Charles Carroll who had signed the Declaration. Carroll immediately returned to Hancock's desk, seized the pen again, and added "of Carrollton" to his name.

In fact, Carroll had been appending "of Carrollton" to his signature for over a decade, the earliest surviving example appearing at the end of a September 15, 1765, letter to his English friend William Gibson. Carrollton Manor was the name of a tract of more than twelve thousand acres in Frederick County, Maryland, which the Carroll family leased to tenant farmers.

== See also ==
- 1840s Carrollton Inn
- Annapolis Convention (1774–1776)
- Memorial to the 56 Signers of the Declaration of Independence
- Carrollton Manor
- Maryland in the American Revolution
- O'Carroll

Maryland Senate
Preceded by Matthew Tilghman	President of the Maryland State Senate; 1783	Succeeded by Daniel Carroll
Preceded by Daniel Carroll	President of the Maryland State Senate; 1783	Succeeded by George Plater
U.S. Senate
Preceded by None	U.S. senator (Class 1) from Maryland; 1789–1792; Served alongside: John Henry	Succeeded by Richard Potts
Honorary titles
Preceded by Thomas Sumter	Oldest living U.S. senator June 1, 1832 – November 14, 1832	Succeeded by Paine Wingate
