= Charles Carroll the Settler =

Irish-born lawyer and planter

Charles Carroll
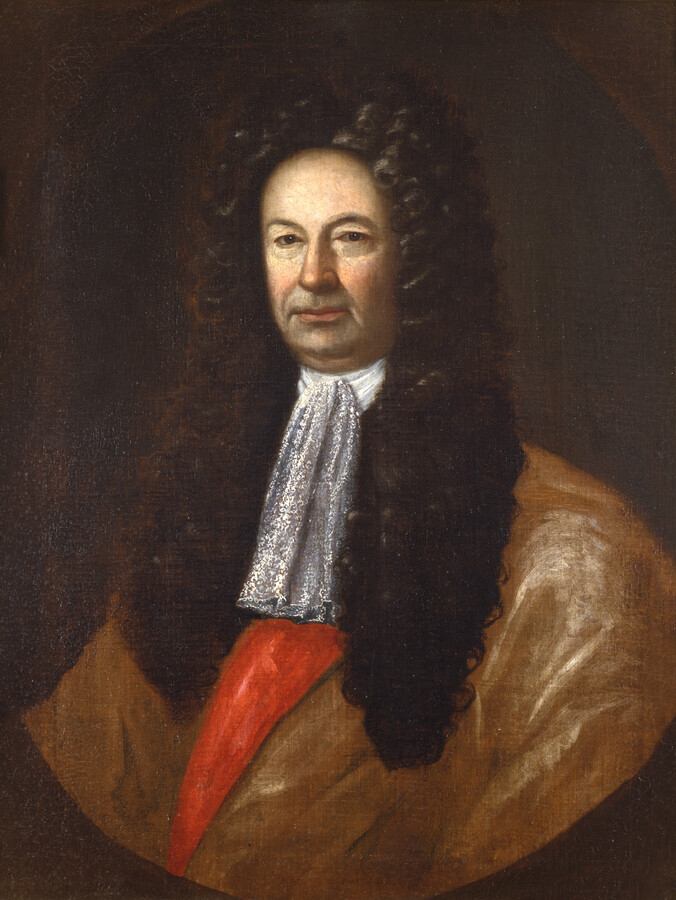
- Possible portrait, c. 1700–1720

Attorney General of the Maryland Colony
- In office 1688–1689

Attorney General for the Calvert Proprietorship
- In office 1689–1717

Attorney General of the Maryland Colony
- In office 1716–1717

Personal details
- Born: 1661 Kingdom of Ireland
- Died: 1720 (aged 58–59) Province of Maryland
- Spouse(s): Martha Ridgely Underwood, Mary Darnall
- Children: 11, including Charles (of Annapolis)
- Occupation: Planter; Lawyer; Businessman

Charles Carroll I (1661–1720), sometimes called Charles Carroll the Settler to differentiate him from his son and grandson, was an Irish-born planter and lawyer who spent most of his life in the English Province of Maryland. Carroll, a Catholic, is best known for his efforts to hold office in the Protestant-dominated colony which eventually resulted in the disfranchisement of Maryland's Catholics.

The second son of Irish Catholic parents, Carroll was educated in France as a lawyer before returning to England, where he pursued the first steps in a legal career. Before that career developed, he secured a position as Attorney General of the young colony of Maryland. Its founder George Calvert, 1st Baron Baltimore and his descendants intended it as a refuge for persecuted Catholics. Carroll supported Charles Calvert, 3rd Baron Baltimore, the colony's Catholic proprietor, in an unsuccessful effort to prevent the Protestant majority from gaining political control over Maryland. Following the overthrow of the Calvert proprietorship and the subsequent exclusion of Catholics from colonial government, Carroll turned his attention to owning slave plantations, law, business, and various offices in the proprietor's remnant organization. He was the wealthiest man in the colony by the time of his death. In the last years of his life, Carroll attempted to regain some vestige of political power for Catholics in the colony, but the Protestant colonial assembly and Governor John Hart disfranchised them. His son, Charles Carroll II of Annapolis, became a wealthy planter and his grandson, Charles Carroll III of Carrollton, also wealthy, was the only Catholic signer of the United States Declaration of Independence.

== Early life ==
Carroll was the second of four sons born to Daniel Carroll of Aghagurty and Littermurna, an Irish Catholic whose family lost much of their land and wealth during the Wars of the Three Kingdoms. The exact place of his birth is unclear, though it was likely near the small town of Aghagurty that Carroll's father took as part of his name. Some of the family property near Aghagurty was obtained by a friend, Richard Grace, who made Daniel Carroll the head tenant. This action gave the family a livelihood, but the family continued to have limited means compared to their former status. It is likely that Charles Carroll was fostered by the wealthier Grace, who had no son; his greater resources could provide for the child's education.

With Grace's support, Carroll was able to attend school in France—at Lille and at the University of Douai—where he studied the humanities, philosophy, and civil and canon law. By May 1685, Carroll had moved to London, where he registered to study English common law and was accepted into the Inner Temple, one of the four Inns of Court that are able to call members to the bar and enable them to practice law. According to family tradition, Carroll secured a position as clerk to William Herbert, 1st Marquess of Powis, an English nobleman who was one of two Catholic peers in the court of James II of England.

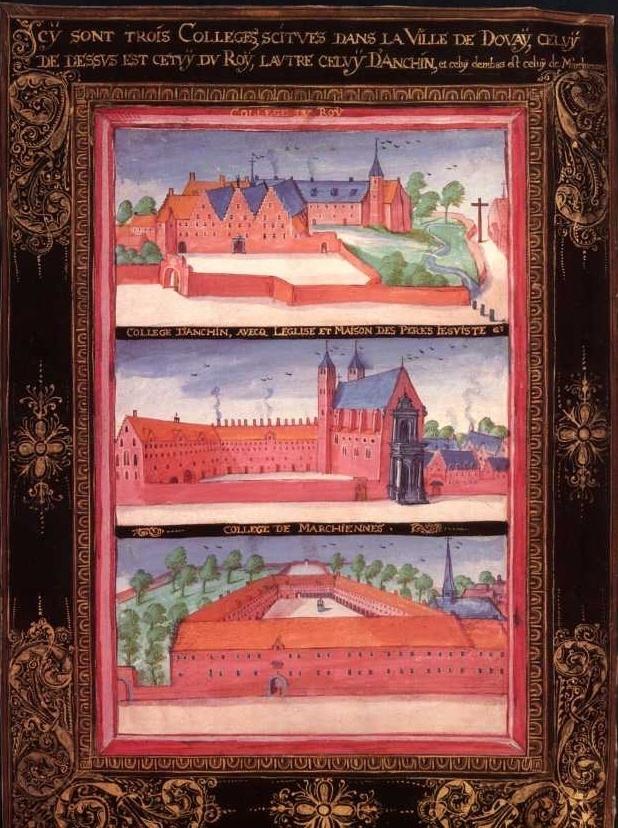
A depiction of the University of Douai in France, where Carroll studied civil and canon law

According to Carroll family tradition, Powis told his new clerk that he believed King James was receiving bad advice related to the religious turmoil in England. Powis was concerned about the consequences for English Catholics. He supposedly spoke on Carroll's behalf to an associate of his, Charles Calvert, proprietor of the Maryland colony. Charles Calvert's grandfather, George Calvert, 1st Baron Baltimore, was a former member of Parliament and Secretary of State to James I, whose Catholicism had effectively ended his political career. Intense lobbying by George Calvert had led to the granting of a hereditary charter to the Calvert family. The Maryland colony was established in the 1630s on land granted by this charter. It was intended as a haven for English Catholics and other religious minorities. Powis may have encouraged Carroll to emigrate to Maryland with the hope that the younger man's career would come to greater fulfillment in a place with less religious conflict than England at the time.

Carroll received a commission from Calvert as the colony's Attorney General on July 18, 1688, and arrived in the colony in October 1688. En route, Carroll changed his family motto from In fide et in bello forte (strong in faith and war) to Ubicumque cum libertate (anywhere so long as there be freedom). Soon after he left, the Protestant William of Orange invaded England, James II fled, and Parliament—which had been leery of James' Catholicism—recognized William and his wife Mary as the new King and Queen two weeks after Carroll's arrival in Maryland. This event, known as the Glorious Revolution, had profound implications for the future of the Maryland colony and for Carroll.

== Career and rise to wealth in Maryland ==
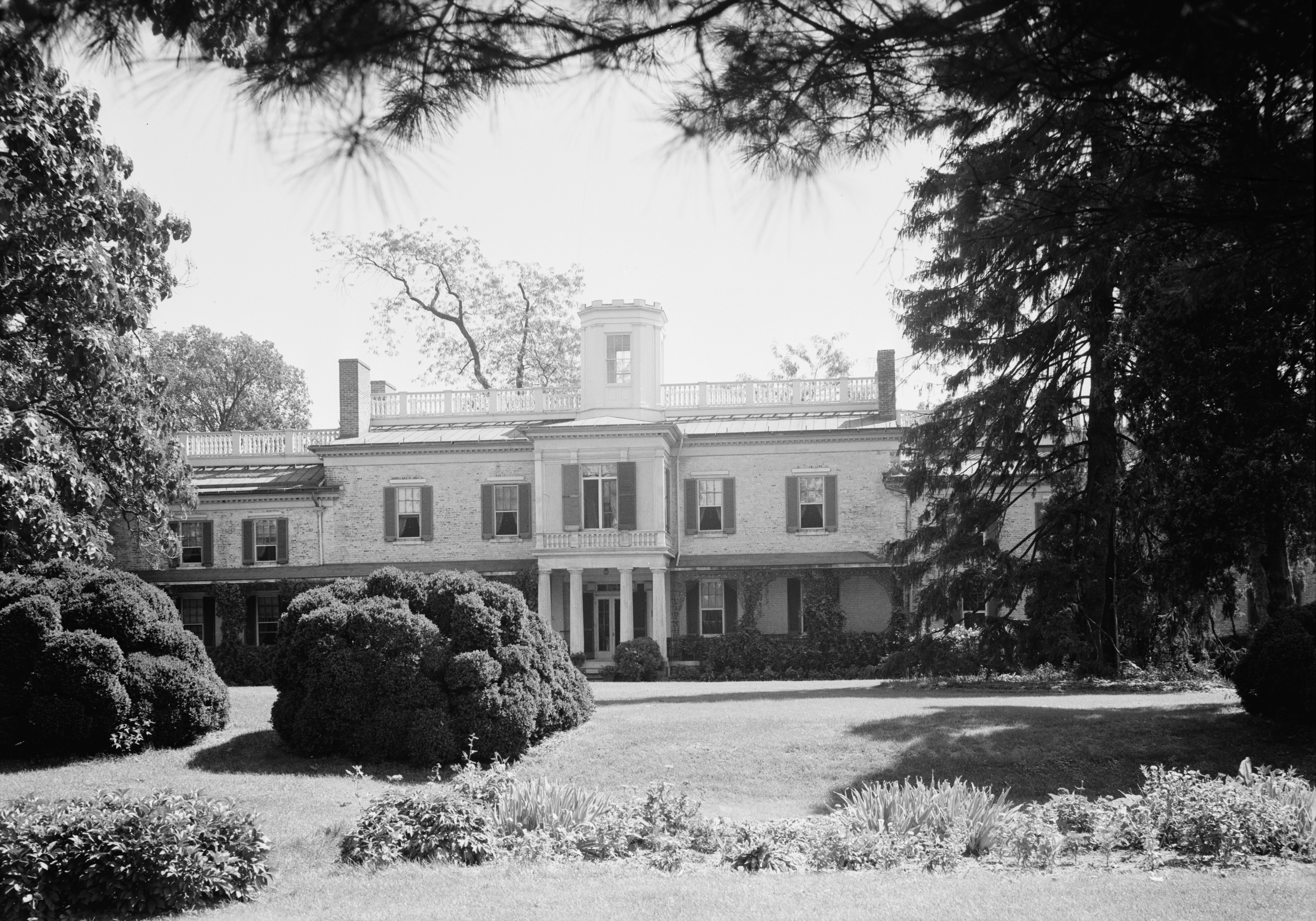
Doughoregan Manor, one of the Carroll family homes in Maryland

Soon after his arrival in Maryland, Carroll presented his commission to the colony's council and was recognized as the new Attorney General of the colony. He arrived in a place already riven by religious and class differences. Carroll and nearly the entire governing structure of the colony, with the exception of the lower house of the proprietary assembly, were appointed by Calvert. Most of the appointees were Catholic and wealthy, whereas the majority of the population and the lower house of the assembly were Protestant and less wealthy. Carroll arrived in Maryland just as long-standing economic, religious, and political tensions between the poorer Protestant majority and the wealthier and more powerful Catholic minority were reaching a head.

By the late 17th century, Maryland's economy was suffering from the effects of price fluctuations on the world market of its main cash crop, tobacco. Often in those years, the price on world markets was barely above the cost of production, leaving the colony's planter class with little to show for their efforts. This affected small Protestant planters disproportionately, as many of the larger Catholic landowners had diversified economically. This growing socioeconomic inequality exacerbated underlying religious tensions. Furthermore, the new Governor, William Joseph, who arrived in the colony just before Carroll, immediately entered into an adversarial relationship with the Protestant-dominated lower house of the assembly. Into this powder keg came the news that England's Glorious Revolution had taken place; the Catholic King James II had been deposed and replaced with the Protestant William of Orange. In an attempt to maintain control in the colony, Governor Joseph quickly canceled the session of the colonial assembly scheduled for April 1689.

In response to this cancellation and rumors of an anti-Protestant alliance between Catholics and Native Americans, Protestant settlers formed an association to defend themselves. In July 1689, they marched on the colonial capital, St. Mary's City. Led by John Coode, the Protestant associators were quickly able to capture St. Mary's and the other major towns of the colony. The Governor and a number of other Calvert allies fled to Virginia. Charles Calvert turned for relief to the Lords of Trade and eventually to the Privy Council, but these groups sided with the Protestants and took away the power of the Calvert family to govern the colony. Soon thereafter, the new leaders of the colony barred Catholics from holding office, bearing arms, or serving on juries.

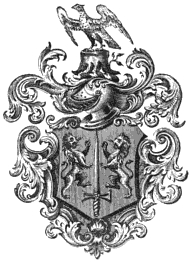
Carroll of Maryland

During the rebellion, Carroll was recovering from the "hard seasoning" often experienced by immigrants whose bodies were acclimatizing to local conditions. Perhaps due to illness, he chose not to flee the colony. Instead, Carroll offered support and legal advice to Calvert and became an outspoken critic of the Protestant government. He was jailed twice for insulting the new colonial leaders, including Governor Lionel Copley, who accused Carroll of, "uttering several mutinous and seditious speeches". Losing his position in the colonial government and the £50 (equal to £10,990 today) annual salary it entailed was a blow to Carroll. His support for Calvert earned him various positions in the private Calvert family organization, which would benefit him throughout his life.

=== Marriage ===
Carroll improved his fortunes through a judicious marriage. In November 1689, he wed Martha Ridgely Underwood (née Hawks), a widow whose two former husbands had left her a small fortune. Her son by Robert Ridgely was Charles Ridgely I, father of Charles Ridgely II. Carroll inherited a portion of this fortune after Martha's death in 1690 in childbirth. The child, named Anthony in honor of Carroll's brother, also died. Restricted in his law practice by the new Protestant government, Carroll used the inheritance to begin importing goods to the colony. He also purchased a store in the town of Annapolis.

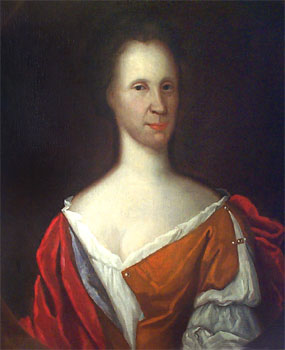
Mary Darnall Carroll, second wife of Charles Carroll and one means to his fortune

In February 1693 or 1694, Carroll remarried, this time to the 15-year-old daughter of Colonel Henry Darnall, Charles Calvert's chief agent in the colony. The marriage to Mary Darnall secured Carroll a tract of land in Prince George's County, a position in the colony's land office with a £100 annual salary, and a lifelong alliance with Henry Darnall. This tract of land was the first part of what would become a vast empire of nearly 50,000 acres (20,000 ha) by the time of Carroll's death, worth approximately £20,000. Some of these lands were worked by the 112 slaves he acquired during his lifetime. This was a very large number of slaves for a Maryland planter in the early colonial period. After 1706, Carroll and his family resided on two properties, a townhouse built in the new colonial capital of Annapolis and the plantation called Dougheregan in modern-day Howard County.

=== Children ===
As successful as Carroll was in business, however, he and his wife experienced many personal losses throughout this period. Of the ten children born to Charles and Mary Carroll, five died within a year of their birth. Henry, their eldest son, died the year before his father in 1719, at the age of 21 or 22. Only the third child, named Charles and later known as Charles Carroll of Annapolis, and their next son Daniel would marry and have children of their own.

Henry Darnall died in 1711. Carroll took over Darnall's positions as agent and receiver general for the Calvert family in the colony, both posts with significant additional salaries. Among the many uses to which he put this money was lending. After 1713, he became the largest mortgage lender in the colony, and made a number of large personal loans to other planters. Carroll continued to practice law, making a small income from cases argued in the two courts where Catholics were still allowed to practice law, the chancery and prerogative courts. His speculation in mercantile enterprises also continued. Together, these made Carroll the wealthiest man in the colony by 1715, and its most prominent Catholic.

== Final attempt at political power and death ==
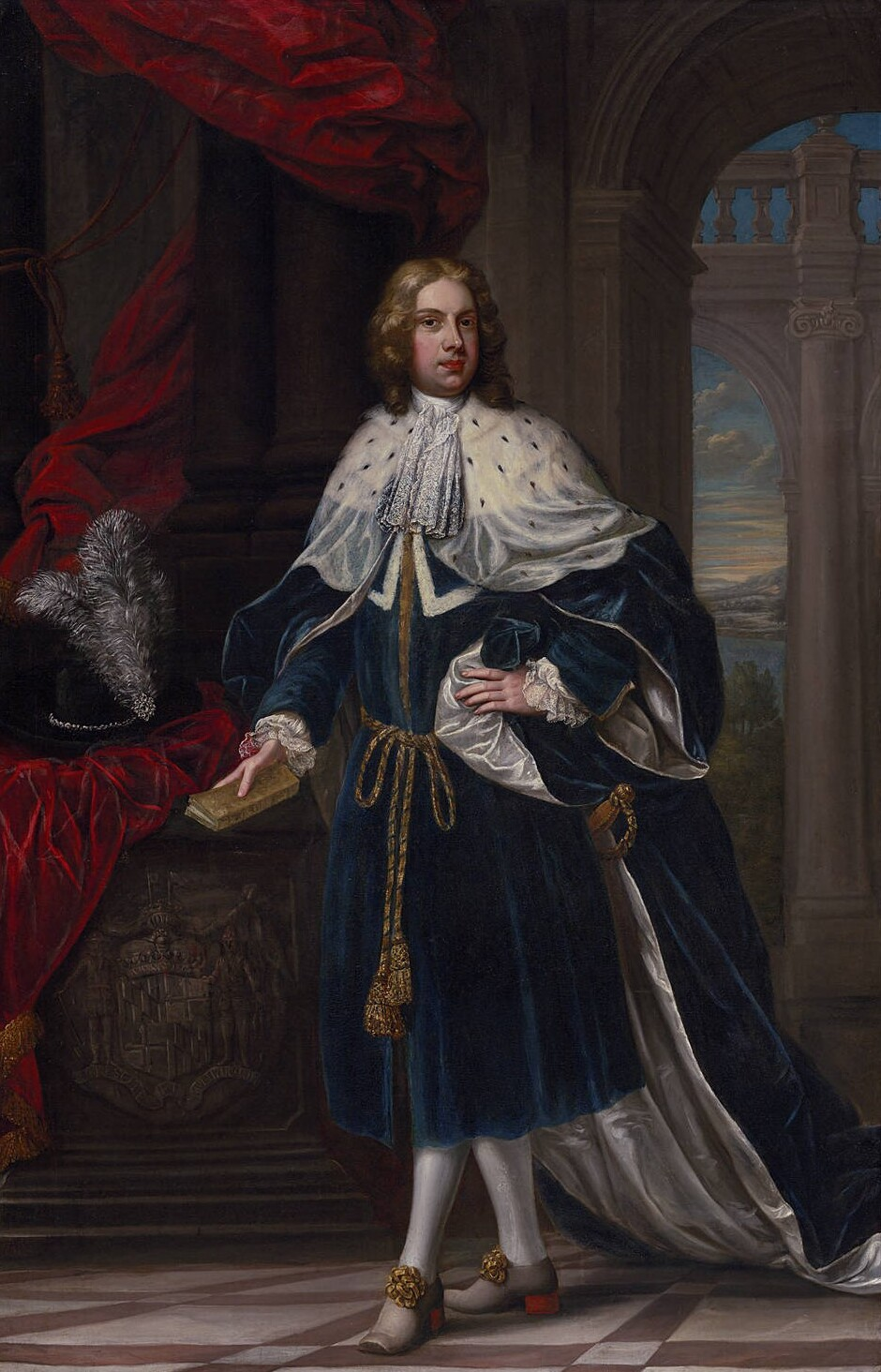
Benedict Calvert, 4th Baron Baltimore, whose restored proprietorship over Maryland did not bring the religious tolerance for which Charles Carroll had hoped

In 1715, political power over the Maryland colony was restored to the Calvert family after the conversion of Benedict Calvert to Protestantism. Emboldened by this turn of events, and with support from a number of prominent Maryland Catholic families, Carroll attempted to gain government office in the state. This would have been a profound departure from the policy of excluding Catholics from government, which had existed since the Protestant takeover in 1689. Carroll's chief antagonist in this effort was the Governor, John Hart. In 1716, Hart discovered that Carroll was planning to travel to England to lobby Calvert's officials for restoration of officeholding rights for Catholics, something Hart vehemently opposed, claiming Carroll had promised against such. Hart described Carroll as:

a professed Papist, and the first fomentor of our late Disturbances, who having acquired a large estate in the Province by the offices he formerly employed, and his practice in Law...must needs add the Ambition of Rule to his former Felicity.

Carroll convinced the proprietor's officials to appoint him as the proprietor's chief agent in the colony. He was further appointed to the positions of receiver general, escheator, and naval officer. These positions together effectively gave Carroll the power to oversee all money in the colony that was collected by the government or by Calvert's private organization.

Upon Carroll's return to Maryland, Hart was incensed both at the threat to his own power and the idea of a Catholic officeholder in the colony. Hart demanded that Carroll take the oath of allegiance, which he was willing to do, and the oath of abjuration confirming the Protestant succession to the English throne, which Carroll was not willing to do. Carroll began to act in the capacity authorized by the proprietor's commission, and Hart turned to the upper house of the colonial legislature for relief. Rejecting Carroll's arguments in support of his right to hold government offices, the assembly resisted his attempts to exercise the commission and, near the end of 1716, passed a series of laws confirming and restricting the oath requirements for officeholders, which were anti-Catholic by intent. Carroll's case may have been undermined when he came to the defense of his nephew, who had raised a toast to the Catholic James Stuart. Stuart had tried to take the British throne during a rebellion in 1715 and was extremely unpopular with Protestants in the colony. The proprietor, whose position had been so recently restored and who did not want to risk the loss of the colony, confirmed the decision of the assembly. Carroll's commission was formally revoked on 20 February 1717. According to a later account Hart gave to the assembly, Carroll began a campaign to undermine the Governor. There is no evidence that Hart was accurate, but the assembly passed stricter anti-Catholic laws in 1718, including disfranchisement, stripping Catholic males of the right to vote.

Carroll died only two years later, with his wealth intact but having failed to regain any political rights for Catholics in Maryland. Carroll's eldest son Henry had died a year before; the family fortune was passed on to his younger sons Charles and Daniel.

His son Charles, known as Charles Carroll of Annapolis, maintained and expanded the family fortune. His grandson, Charles Carroll of Carrollton, achieved the restoration of political rights his grandfather had desired. He became the only Catholic to sign the United States Declaration of Independence.

== See also ==
- Carroll family
- Colonial families of Maryland
