= Edward Robert Petre =

English horse racer and politician

The Honourable Edward Robert Petre

Member of Parliament for York
- In office 10 December 1832 – 6 January 1835 Serving with Samuel Adlam Bayntun, Hon. Thomas Dundas
- Preceded by: Hon. Thomas Dundas
- Succeeded by: Hon. John Dundas

Member of Parliament for Ilchester
- In office 30 April 1831 – 10 December 1832 Serving with Stephen Lushington
- Preceded by: Michael Bruce
- Succeeded by: Constituency disenfranchised

Personal details
- Born: 28 September 1794
- Died: 8 June 1848 (aged 53)
- Political party: Whig
- Spouse: Hon. Laura Maria Stafford-Jerningham (m. 1829)
- Relations: Robert Edward Petre, 10th Baron Petre (half-brother); Bernard Howard, 12th Duke of Norfolk (uncle)
- Parent(s): Robert Petre, 9th Baron Petre; Juliana Barbara Howard

Hon. Edward Robert Petre of Stapleton Park (28 September 1794 – 8 June 1848) was an English horse racer and politician.

== Early life ==
Petre was born on 28 September 1794 and came from an old, and prominent, English Catholic family, based at Writtle Park in Essex. He was the third, but second surviving son of Robert Edward Petre, 9th Baron Petre (1742–1801), whose peerage dated from 1603. His mother was Petre's second wife, the former Juliana Barbara Howard, who was 27 years younger than his father. Upon his father’s death in 1801, his mother was appointed his guardian. His sister, Hon. Julia Maria Petre, was the wife of Sir Samuel Brooke-Pechell, 3rd Baronet.

His father’s first wife, Anne Howard, was a niece of Edward Howard, 9th Duke of Norfolk and his elder half-brother, Robert Edward Petre, 10th Baron Petre, married Mary Bridget Howard, Edward's maternal aunt. Both Edward's aunt Mary and his mother Juliana were sisters of Bernard Howard, who succeeded to the title of 12th Duke of Norfolk in 1815 upon the death of their cousin, Charles Howard, 11th Duke of Norfolk. Edward's nephew William became the 11th Baron Petre in 1809. His paternal grandparents were Robert Petre, 8th Baron Petre, a renowned horticulturist, and Lady Henrietta Anna Mary Barbara Radclyffe (daughter of the 3rd Earl of Derwentwater, who was the grandson of King Charles II by his mistress Moll Davis). His maternal grandparents were Juliana (née Molyneux) Howard and Henry Howard of Glossop, a descendant of Henry Frederick Howard, 22nd Earl of Arundel).

== Career ==
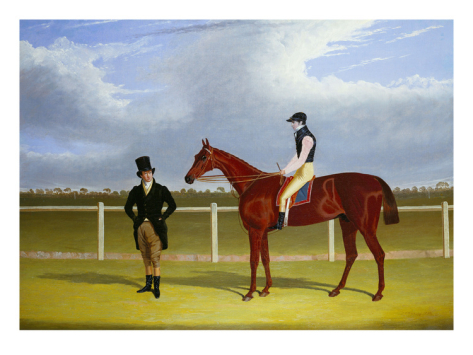
Rowton, by John Frederick Herring, 1831

Petre, who was described by the English wit Sydney Smith as "a sensible, good looking, pleasing man", was a leading figure on the Turf, and kept a stable with Rodes Milnes (uncle of Richard Monckton Milnes), winning the St Leger Stakes five times between 1822 and 1830. In 1827, he won £15,000 at a race and celebrated his win with a "grand ball" at Stapleton Park, a mansion designed by John Carr. His elder half-brother had inherited the house upon their father's death in 1801 and Edward took possession around 1816.

He built a private racecourse in the southwest part of his estate and, in 1822, he started the Stapleton Races. Petre also commissioned John Frederick Herring to create a number of paintings of his horses.

=== Political career ===
He became an alderman of York in 1829 and, from 1830 to 1831, Petre served as Sheriff of Yorkshire, and the Lord Mayor of York. He was the first Catholic sheriff to be appointed after emancipation, as George IV stated Petre was a "good fellow ... he had had some concerns with him in racing and he did not mind him."

In 1831, Petre was returned, unopposed, for Ilchester on Lord Cleveland's interest to succeed Michael Bruce. While in the House, he voted "to punish only those guilty of bribery at the Dublin election and against the censure motion on the Irish administration." On 21 November 1831, he became a member of the Maldon Independent Club, the principal organization of the Essex Whigs.

Ilchester was disfranchised by the Reform Act 1832, but Petre renewed his connection with York, where he was returned at the general election of 1832 to succeed Hon. Thomas Dundas. He sat until his retirement in 1834 as a reformer and supporter of the Whig administration and "advocated ‘free trade ... the immediate abolition of slavery, the substitution of a property for the house and window tax, and the abolition of all monopolies" He stood, unsuccessfully, as a Liberal at Bridport in 1847.

== Personal life ==
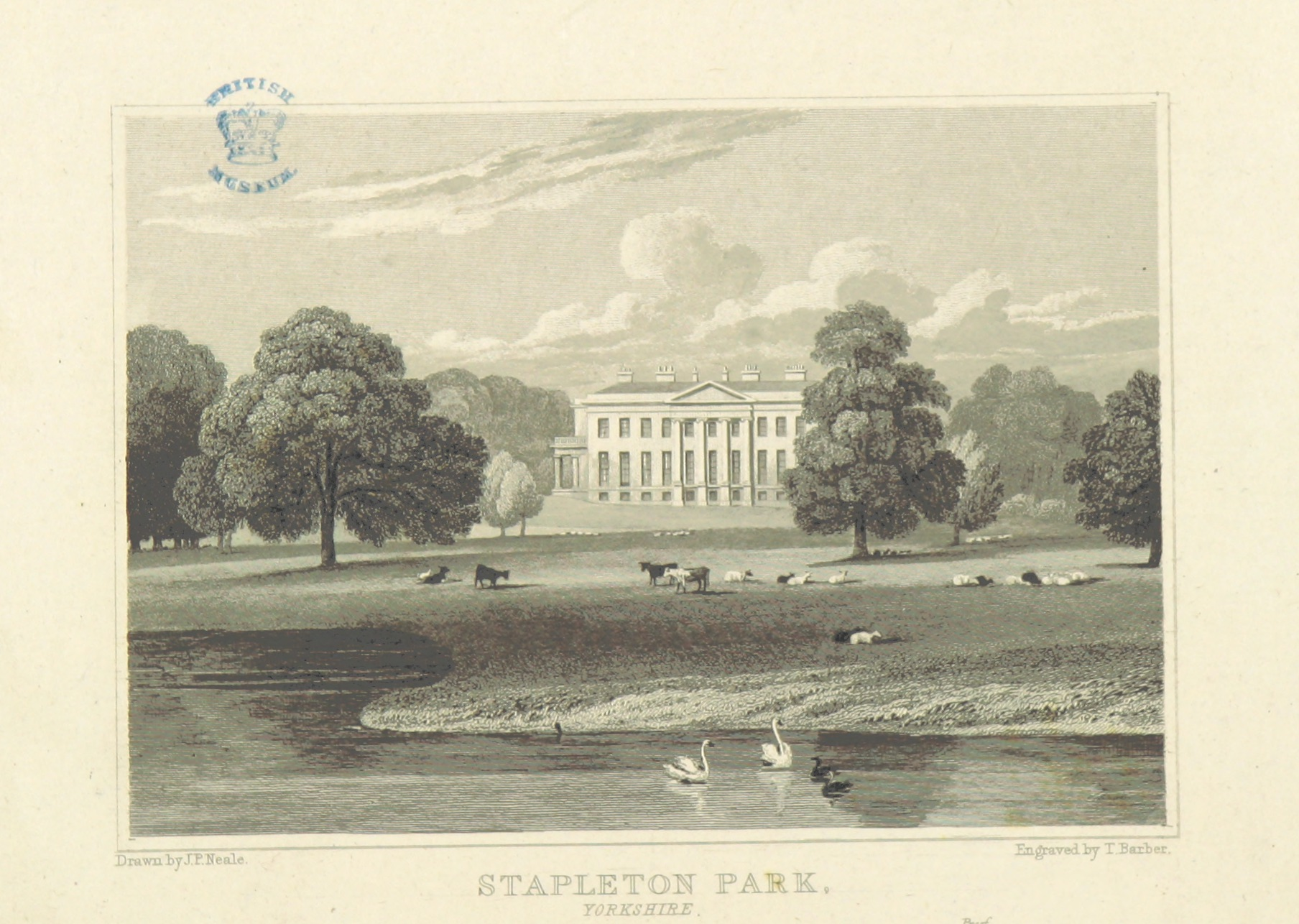
Stapleton Park, 1818

On 21 July 1829, Petre was married to the Hon. Laura Maria Stafford-Jerningham (1811–1886), a daughter of George Stafford-Jerningham, 8th Baron Stafford and, his first wife, Frances Henrietta Sulyarde (youngest daughter and co-heiress of Edward Sulyarde of Haughley Hall). Among her siblings were Henry Stafford-Jerningham, 9th Baron Stafford, the Hon. Sir George Stafford-Jerningham (who served as the British Minister to Sweden), the Hon. William Stafford-Jerningham (who served as the British Minister Resident at Lima in Peru).

In 1838, Petre sold Stapleton Park to John Watson Barton of Saxby Hall, who had previously rented the property, and it was where one of his daughters was born in 1835. The Hall remained in the Barton family until 1919 when it was sold again, before it was demolished in 1958 and the estate sold in divided lots.

Petre died on 8 June 1848 and left all his property to his wife, apart from a few small bequests mainly to Catholic charities.

Parliament of the United Kingdom
Preceded by Michael Bruce	Member of Parliament for Ilchester; 1831–1832; With: Stephen Lushington	Succeeded by Constituency disenfranchised
Preceded by Hon. Thomas Dundas	Member of Parliament for York; 1832–1835; With: Samuel Adlam Bayntun 1832–1833; Hon. Thomas Dundas 1834	Succeeded by Hon. John Dundas
Honorary titles
Preceded by George Osbaldeston	High Sheriff of Yorkshire; 1830–1831	Succeeded by Sir Henry Goodricke
