= Sir William Jerningham, 6th Baronet =

English landowner

Sir William Jerningham, Bt
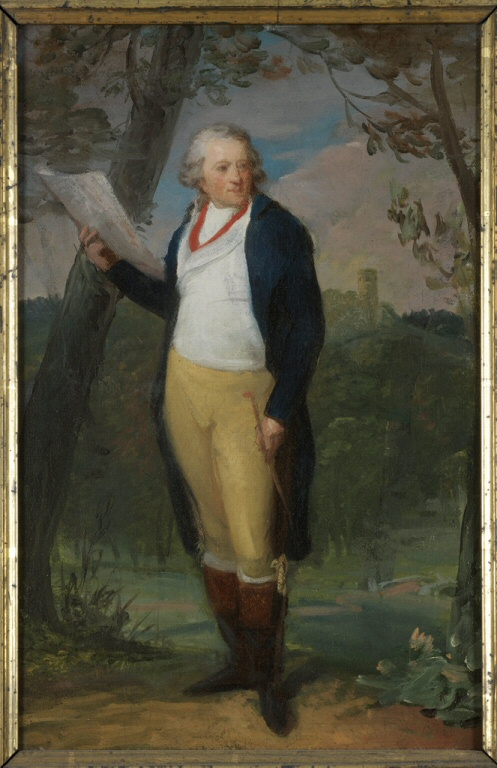
- Study for the Portrait of Sir William, by Henri-Pierre Danloux, 1795
- Born: William Jerningham; 7 March 1736
- Died: 14 August 1809 (aged 73); Costessey Hall, Norfolk
- Spouse: Hon. Frances Dillon (m. 1767; died 1809)
- Children: 4, including George
- Parent(s): Sir George Jerningham, 5th Baronet; Marie Françoise Plowden

Sir William Jerningham, 6th Baronet, de jure 7th Baron Stafford (7 March 1736 – 14 August 1809) was an English landowner.

== Early life ==
Jerningham was born on 7 March 1736. He was the only son of Marie Françoise "Mary" Plowden (1704–1785) and Sir George Jerningham, 5th Baronet. His mother was the sole heiress of her uncle, John Stafford-Howard, 4th Earl of Stafford.

His maternal grandparents were Francis Plowden, an MP for Bannow who served as Comptroller of the Household of the exiled Jacobite court of James II, and Mary Stafford-Howard (eldest daughter of Hon. John Stafford-Howard of Stafford Castle and granddaughter of William Howard, 1st Viscount Stafford and Mary Howard, Countess of Stafford).

== Career ==
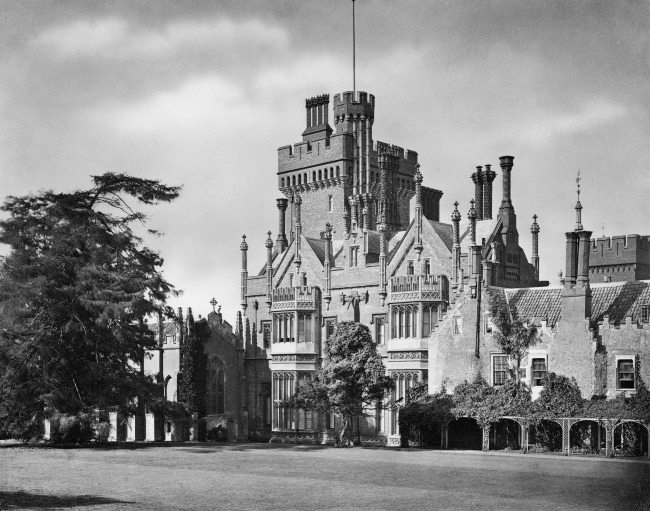
Costessey Hall, seat of the Jerningham family (now demolished), c. 1850

Jerningham was the representative of one of the few remaining families of English Gentry prior to the Conquest, and was descended on many sides from King Edward III.

Upon the death of his father on 21 January 1774, he succeeded as the 7th Baronet Jerningham. On the death of Lady Anastasia Stafford-Howard in 1807, he would have become the 7th Baron Stafford but for the attainder, which was reversed by his son in 1824.

== Personal life ==
On 16 June 1767, Sir William married the Hon. Frances Dillon (c. 1747–1825), daughter of Henry Dillon, 11th Viscount Dillon and Lady Charlotte Lee (a daughter of the 2nd Earl of Lichfield). The Dillon family also had a strong Jacobite heritage. Together they were the parents of:

- Charlotte Georgiana Jerningham (1770–1854), who married Sir Richard Bedingfeld, 5th Baronet, son of Sir Richard Bedingfeld, 4th Baronet, in 1795.
- George William Stafford-Jerningham, 8th Baron Stafford (1771–1851), who married Frances Henrietta Sulyarde, daughter of Edward Sulyarde of Haughley Hall, in 1799. After her death, he married American heiress Elizabeth Caton, daughter of Richard Caton and Mary Carroll (a daughter of Charles Carroll, the last surviving signer of the Declaration of Independence) in 1836. Among her siblings were Marianne Wellesley, Marchioness Wellesley and Louisa D'Arcy-Osborne, Duchess of Leeds.
- William Charles Jerningham (1772–1820), an Officer in the Austrian service who married Anne Wright, daughter of Thomas Wright, in 1803. After her death, he married Anne Moore, daughter of Edward Moore, in 1816.
- Edward Jerningham (1774–1822), a barrister who served as Secretary for British Catholic Board who married Emily Middleton, daughter of Nathaniel Middleton, in 1804.

Sir William died at his seat, Costessey Hall in Norfolk, on 14 August 1809. His youngest son Edward designed the St. Augustine Chapel at the family seat which opened the week after his death in 1809.

Peerage of England
Preceded by Anastasia Stafford-Howard	Baron Stafford de jure 1807–1809	Succeeded by George Stafford-Jerningham
Baronetage of England
Preceded by George Jerningham	Baronet (of Cossey); 1776–1809	Succeeded by George Stafford-Jerningham
