= William Stafford-Jerningham =

English career diplomat

The Honourable William Stafford-Jerningham

British Minister Resident and Consul-General at Lima
- In office 1873–1874
- Preceded by: Inaugural holder
- Succeeded by: Spenser St. John

Personal details
- Born: William George Stafford-Jerningham; 15 July 1812; Costessey Hall, Norfolk
- Died: 16 July 1874 (aged 62); Southampton
- Spouse: Eglantina Narcissa Elmore (m. 1860)
- Relations: Henry Stafford-Jerningham, 9th Baron Stafford (brother); George Jerningham (brother)
- Parent(s): George Stafford-Jerningham, 8th Baron Stafford; Hon. Frances Henrietta Sulyarde

Hon. William George Stafford-Jerningham (15 July 1812 – 16 July 1874) was an English career diplomat.

== Early life ==
Jerningham was born on 15 July 1812 at Cossey Hall in Norwich. He was the fifth son of George Stafford-Jerningham, 8th Baron Stafford and, his first wife, the former Hon. Frances Henrietta Sulyarde. After his parents marriage, they lived at Haughley Hall until 1809 when his father inherited his grandfather's title and estate and they moved to the Jerningham family seat of Costessey Hall. From 1826 to 1836, his father J. C. Buckler built a Gothic castle at Costessey which was several times larger than the original Tudor hall. In 1824, his father managed to obtain a reversal of the attainder of the barony of Stafford (the attainder had been imposed on his ancestor William Howard, 1st Viscount Stafford and 1st Baron Stafford in 1680). At the same time, the family assumed the additional surname of Stafford by Royal licence.

Among his siblings were the Hon. Charlotte Stafford-Jerningham (wife of Thomas Fraser, 12th Lord Lovat), Henry Stafford-Jerningham, 9th Baron Stafford, a Member of Parliament for Pontefract, Hon. Edward Stafford-Jerningham (whose sons inherited the barony), Hon George Jerningham, who served as the British Minister to Sweden, Hon. Charles Stafford-Jerningham, a Lieutenant in the 6th Dragoon Guards, the Hon. Maria Stafford-Jerningham (wife of Robert Edward Petre MP and nephew of Bernard Howard, 12th Duke of Norfolk), and Hon. Francis Hugh Joseph Stafford-Jerningham.

== Career ==
Jerningham entered the diplomatic service as attaché at Munich in 1834, and was transferred to Berlin later the same year and to Vienna two years later. In 1839, he was presented to Queen Victoria by the Secretary of State for Foreign Affairs (and future Prime Minister) Henry John Temple, 3rd Viscount Palmerston. From 1839 to 1850, he served as paid attaché at the Hague, and in the latter year became the secretary to the legation at Rio de Janeiro, where he remained until 1857, filling the post of chargé d'affaires twice during that period.

Beginning on 1 December 1857 he was Chargé d'Affaires and Consul-General to the Republic of Peru. In December 1873, he was appointed Her Majesty's Minister Resident and Consul-General at Lima, serving until his death the following year.

== Personal life ==
On 12 April 1860, Jerningham was married to Eglantina Narcissa Elmore, daughter of Frederick Augustus Elmore of Lima, who served in Lord Cochrane's Squadron during the Peruvian War of Independence. He was said to be "extremely fond of music".

Jerningham died, without issue, at Southampton on 16 July 1874, aged 62.

Diplomatic posts
Preceded by Inaugural holder	Minister Resident and Consul-General to the Republic of Peru; 1873–1874	Succeeded by Spenser St. John
