= John Bettes =

John Bettes may refer to:

- John Bettes the Elder (active c. 1531–1570) English artist whose few known paintings date from between about 1543 and 1550
- John Bettes the Younger (died 1616) English portrait painter and son of John Bettes the Elder
