= George Stafford-Jerningham, 8th Baron Stafford =

British peer

The Right Honourable The Lord Stafford FSA
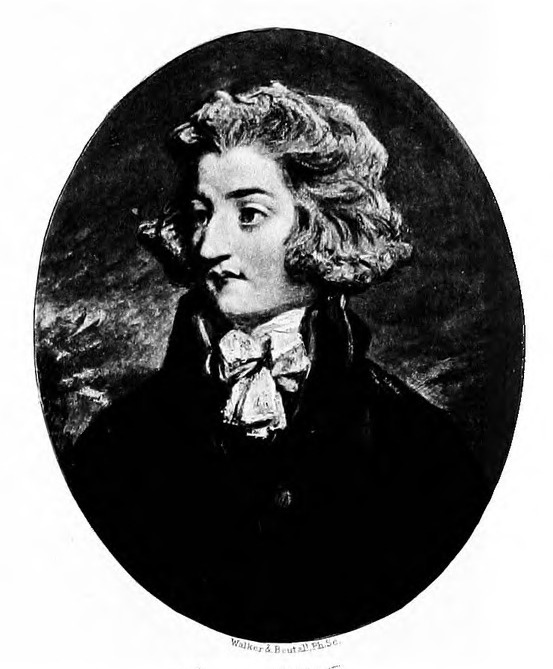

Personal details
- Born: George William Jerningham; 27 April 1771
- Died: 4 October 1851 (aged 80)
- Spouses: Frances Henrietta Sulyarde (m. 1799; died 1832) Elizabeth Caton (m. 1836)
- Relations: Henry Dillon, 11th Viscount Dillon (grandfather)
- Children: 12, including Henry, George, and William
- Parent(s): Sir William Jerningham, 6th Baronet; Hon. Frances Dillon

George William Stafford-Jerningham, 8th Baron Stafford (27 April 1771 – 4 October 1851), known as Sir George William Jerningham, 7th Baronet from 1809 to 1824, was a British peer who, in 1824, successfully obtained a reversal of the attainder of the barony of Stafford.

== Early life ==
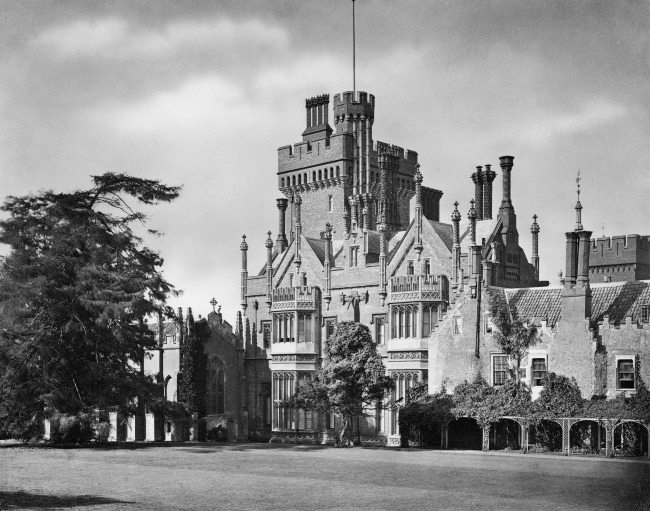
Costessey Hall, seat of the Jerningham family (now demolished), c. 1850

Stafford was born on 27 April 1771. He was the son and heir of the former Hon. Frances Dillon (1747–1825) and Sir William Jerningham, 6th Baronet (1736–1809) of Cossey Park in Norfolk. His elder sister, Charlotte Georgiana Jerningham, was the wife of Sir Richard Bedingfeld, 5th Baronet. He had two younger brothers, William Charles Jerningham (one of his daughters married Edward Preston, 13th Viscount Gormanston and another married Sir Edward Charles Blount) and Edward Jerningham, a barrister who served as Secretary for British Catholic Board and designed the St. Augustine Chapel at the family seat, Costessey Hall, which opened the week after their father's death in 1809. Edward married Emily Middleton of London in 1804, with whom he had four children.

His father was the representative of one of the few remaining families of English Gentry prior to the Conquest, and was descended on many sides from King Edward III. His paternal grandparents were Sir George Jerningham, 5th Baronet and the former Marie Françoise "Mary" Plowden (only surviving child of Mary Stafford-Howard and Francis Plowden, Comptroller of the Household James II and James III). His grandmother Mary was the sole heiress of her uncle, John Stafford-Howard, 4th Earl of Stafford (son of Hon. John Stafford-Howard of Stafford Castle, younger son of William Howard, 1st Viscount Stafford). His mother was the eldest daughter of Henry Dillon, 11th Viscount Dillon and the former Lady Charlotte Lee (second daughter of George Lee, 2nd Earl of Lichfield and descendant of King Charles II of England). On his mother's side, General Dillon’s sister, he was the cousin of Elizabeth Françoise Dillon, Countess Bertrand, who, along with her husband Henri-Gatien Bertrand, would follow Napoleon to Saint Helena.

== Career ==
He succeeded as seventh Baronet of Costessey on 14 August 1809. In 1824, he obtained a reversal of the attainder of the barony of Stafford (the attainder had been imposed on his ancestor William Howard, 1st Viscount Stafford and 1st Baron Stafford in 1680). The family assumed by Royal licence the additional surname of Stafford at the same time.

In 1829, he was made a fellow of the Society of Antiquaries of London, a learned society founded in 1707.

== Personal life ==
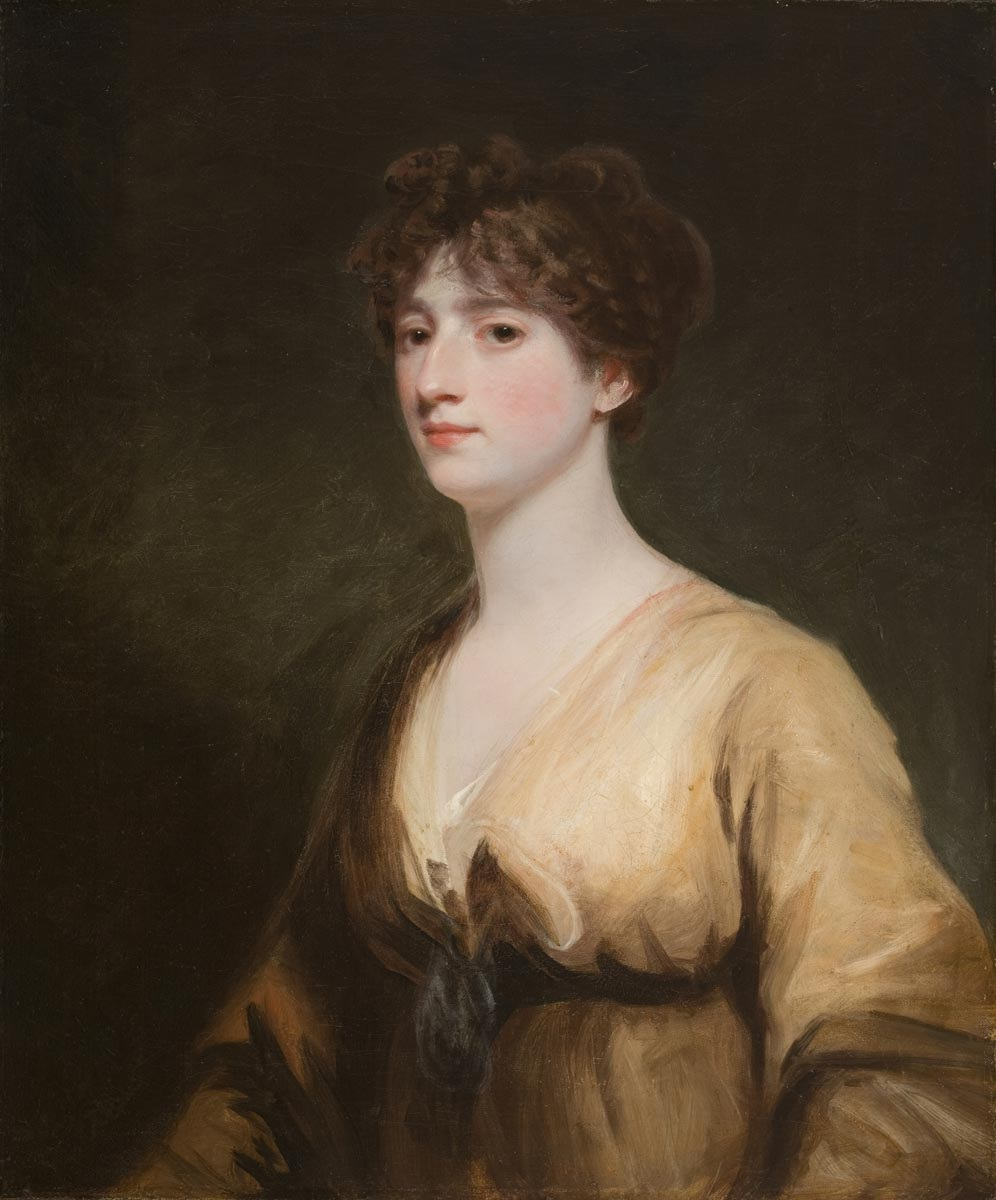
Portrait of his first wife, Frances (née Sulyarde) Jerningham, by John Hoppner, 1800.

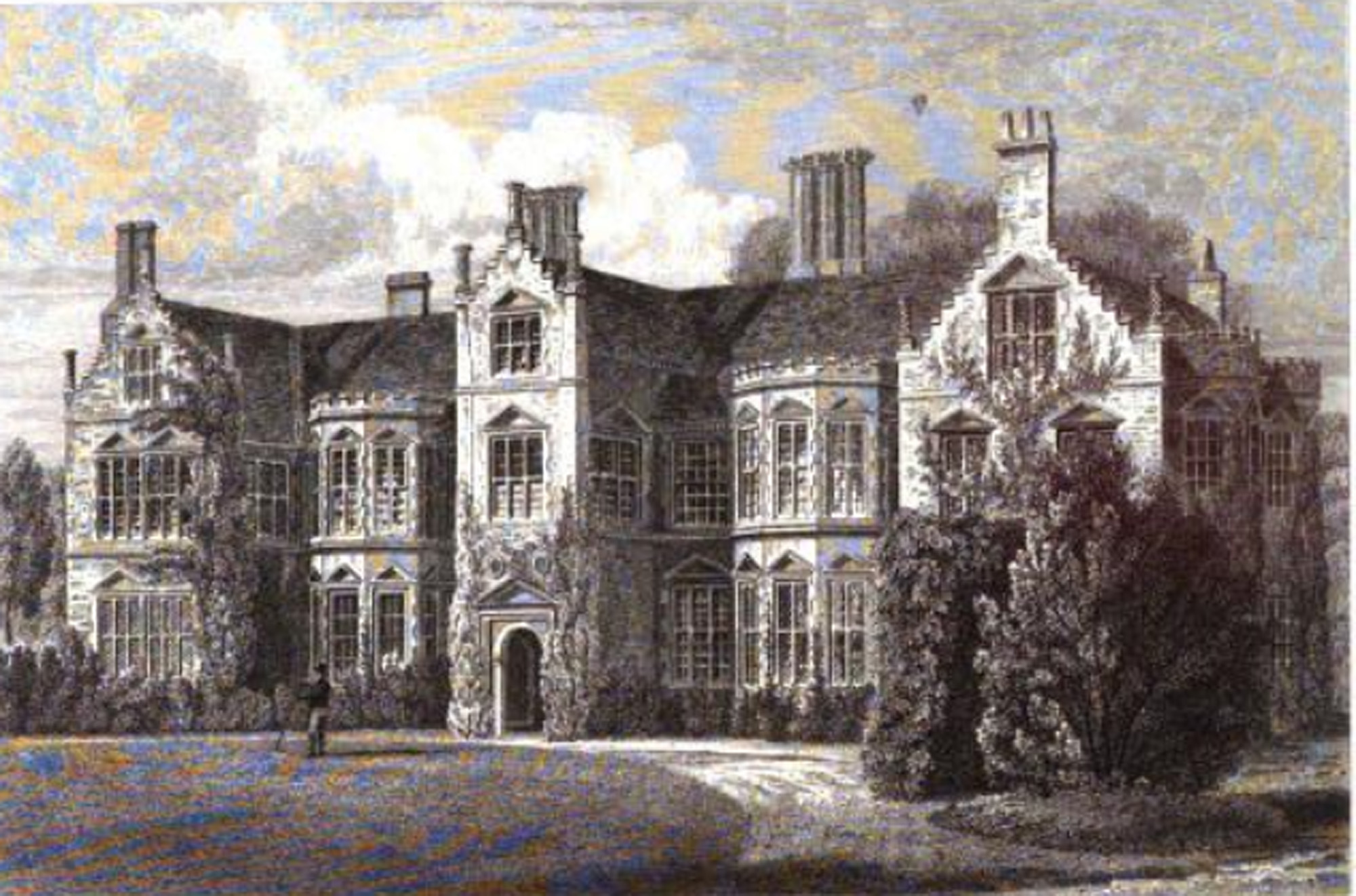
Engraving of Haughley Park in 1827

Lord Stafford was twice married. His first marriage was on 26 December 1799 to Frances Henrietta Sulyarde (1776–1832), youngest daughter and co-heiress of Edward Sulyarde of Haughley Hall and the former Susanna Ravenscroft (eldest daughter and co-heiress of John Ravenscroft of Wykeham). Before her death on 14 November 1832, they were the parents of six sons and six daughters:

- Hon. Charlotte Georgina (8 October 1800 – 28 May 1876), who married Thomas Fraser, 12th Lord Lovat, in 1823. They were the parents of Simon Fraser, 13th Lord Lovat, and great-grandparents of Sir Pyers Charles Mostyn, 10th Baronet.
- Henry Valentine, 9th Baron Stafford (1802–1884)
- Hon. Frances Sophia (15 February 1803 – 13 May 1838), twin sister; died unmarried
- Hon. Georgiana (15 February 1803 – 11 November 1841), twin sister; died unmarried
- Hon. Edward (4 August 1804 – 22 July 1849), married Marianne Smyth (d. 1859), daughter of John Smythe, Esq., in 1828; father of 10th Lord Stafford
- Hon. Sir George Sulyarde (1806–1874), who served as Envoy Extraordinary and Minister Plenipotentiary to Sweden from 1859 to 1872.
- Hon. Charles William (22 August 1807 – 4 April 1884), a Lieutenant in the 6th Dragoon Guards who died unmarried.
- Hon. Mary Alathea (4 June 1809 – 23 May 1813), died young
- Hon. Laura Maria (11 January 1811 – 24 June 1886), who married Hon. Robert Edward Petre MP, eldest son of Robert Petre, 9th Baron Petre and, his second wife, Lady Juliana Barbara Howard (sister of Bernard Howard, 12th Duke of Norfolk), in 1829.
- Hon. William George (1812–1874), who served as Minister Resident at Lima in Peru from 1857 to 1874 and who married Eglantina Narcissa Elmore, daughter of Frederick Augustus Elmore of Lima, in 1860.
- Hon. Francis Hugh Joseph (20 March 1814 – 10 October 1874), died unmarried
- Hon. Isabella Maria (20 August 1815 – 1 January 1847), died unmarried

The couple lived at Haughley Hall until 1809 when he inherited his father's title and estate. They moved to the Jerningham family seat of Costessey Hall and lived there for the rest of their lives. Haughley Hall was sold to William Crawford in about 1816. From 1826 to 1836, J. C. Buckler built a Gothic castle at Costessey for Lord Stafford which was several times larger than the original Tudor hall.

After Frances' death in 1832, he married Elizabeth Caton (1790–1862), second daughter of Richard Caton and Mary Carroll Caton (a daughter of Charles Carroll of Carrollton), on 26 May 1836. One of her sisters, Marianne, was the second wife of Richard Wellesley, 1st Marquess Wellesley. Another, Louisa, was the wife of Sir Felton Hervey-Bathurst, 1st Baronet and, after his death, Francis D'Arcy-Osborne, 7th Duke of Leeds. The youngest was Emily Caton, wife of John McTavish, the Scottish-born British Consul at Baltimore.

Lord Stafford died on 4 October 1851 and was buried at Cossey, Norfolk. He was succeeded in the baronetcy and barony by his eldest son, Henry. Lady Stafford died eleven years later on 29 October 1862.

=== Descendants ===
Through his second son Edward, he was a grandfather of Augustus Stafford-Jerningham, 10th Baron Stafford (1830–1892), FitzHerbert Stafford-Jerningham, 11th Baron Stafford (1833–1913), Emily Charlotte Stafford-Jerningham (1835–1881), wife of Basil Thomas Fitzherbert (parents of Francis Fitzherbert-Stafford, 12th Baron Stafford and Admiral Edward Fitzherbert, 13th Baron Stafford), and Rosa Stafford-Jerningham (1838–1880), who became a nun.

Peerage of England
Preceded by William Jerningham de jure	Baron Stafford; 1809–1851	Succeeded by Henry Valentine Stafford-Jerningham
Baronetage of England
Preceded by William Jerningham	Baronet (of Cossey); 1809–1851	Succeeded by Henry Valentine Stafford-Jerningham
