= George Jerningham =

British diplomat (1806-1874)

The Honourable George Jerningham CB

British Envoy and Minister to the Kingdom of Sweden
- In office 1859–1872
- Preceded by: Arthur Magenis
- Succeeded by: Hon. Edward Erskine

Personal details
- Born: George Sulyarde Jerningham; 17 February 1806
- Died: 18 May 1874 (aged 68)
- Relations: Henry Stafford-Jerningham, 9th Baron Stafford (brother)
- Parent(s): George Stafford-Jerningham, 8th Baron Stafford; Hon. Frances Henrietta Sulyarde

Hon. George Sulyarde Stafford-Jerningham CB (17 February 1806 – 18 May 1874), was an English career diplomat who served as the British Minister to Sweden from 1859 to 1872.

== Early life ==
George Sulyarde Jerningham was born on 17 February 1806. He was the third son of George Stafford-Jerningham, 8th Baron Stafford and, his first wife, the former Hon. Frances Henrietta Sulyarde. After his parents marriage, they lived at Haughley Hall until 1809 when his father inherited his grandfather's title and estate and they moved to the Jerningham family seat of Costessey Hall. From 1826 to 1836, his father J. C. Buckler built a Gothic castle at Costessey which was several times larger than the original Tudor hall. In 1824, his father managed to obtain a reversal of the attainder of the barony of Stafford (the attainder had been imposed on his ancestor William Howard, 1st Viscount Stafford and 1st Baron Stafford in 1680). At the same time, the family assumed the additional surname of Stafford by Royal licence.

Among his siblings were the Hon. Charlotte Stafford-Jerningham (wife of Thomas Fraser, 12th Lord Lovat), Henry Stafford-Jerningham, 9th Baron Stafford, a Member of Parliament for Pontefract, Hon. Edward Stafford-Jerningham (whose sons inherited the barony), Hon. Charles Stafford-Jerningham, a Lieutenant in the 6th Dragoon Guards, the Hon. Maria Stafford-Jerningham (wife of Robert Edward Petre MP and nephew of Bernard Howard, 12th Duke of Norfolk), Hon. William George Stafford-Jerningham, the Minister Resident at Lima, and Hon. Francis Hugh Joseph Stafford-Jerningham.

== Career ==
Jerningham was attached to the Embassies at St Petersburg and the Hague in 1826, was appointed a paid Attaché at the Hague in 1832, and Secretary of Legation in 1833, was Chargé d'Affaires there until 1838, when he was sent as Secretary of Legation to Turin, where he was Chargé d'Affaires in 1838; he was subsequently Secretary of Legation and Chargé d'Affaires at Madrid, Secretary of the Embassy at the Ottoman Porte and at Paris, where he acted on several occasions as Chargé d’Affaires.

He was appointed Envoy Extraordinary and Minister Plenipotentiary to the King of Sweden and Norway in November 1853, but did not proceed to his destination. In 1854, he was sent in similar capacity to Württemberg (also known as Stuttgart), and to Stockholm in 1859, serving until 1872. He was appointed a Companion of the Order of the Bath.

== Personal life ==
Jerningham died, unmarried, on 18 May 1874 at age 68.

Diplomatic posts
Preceded by Arthur Magenis	Envoy Extraordinary and Minister Plenipotentiary to the King of Sweden and Norway; 1859–1872	Succeeded by Hon. Edward Erskine
