= Henry Jerningham (disambiguation) =

Henry Jerningham was an English courtier.

Henry Jerningham may also refer to:

- Sir Henry Jerningham, 1st Baronet (died 1646), of the Jerningham baronets
- Sir Henry Jerningham, 2nd Baronet (c. 1620–1680), of the Jerningham baronets
- Henry Stafford-Jerningham, 9th Baron Stafford (1802–1884), British peer and politician
- Sir Henry William Stafford Jerningham, 11th Baronet (1867–1935, of the Jerningham baronets
