= Edward Petre =

Edward Petre may refer to:

- Sir Edward Petre, 3rd Baronet (1631–1699), English Jesuit and adviser to King James II
- Edward Robert Petre (1794–1848), English horse racer politician
