= Chiverton =

Chiverton is a surname. Notable people with the surname include:

- Henry Chiverton (1511–1574/81), English politician
- Richard Chiverton (died 1679), English Lord Mayor of London
