= Jerningham =

Jerningham is an English surname. Notable people with the surname include:

- Jerningham Wakefield (1820–1879), the only son of Edward Gibbon Wakefield
- Henry Jerningham (1509/10–1572), English courtier during the reigns of Henry VIII, Edward VI, Mary I and Elizabeth I
- Henry Stafford-Jerningham, 9th Baron Stafford (1802–1884), British peer and politician
- Hubert Jerningham, KCMG, DL (1842–1914), British Liberal Party politician and Governor of Trinidad and Tobago 1897–1900

== See also ==
- Jerningham Baronets, of Cossey in the County of Norfolk, was a title in the Baronetage of England
