= Ralph Mitchell =

Ralph Mitchell may refer to:

- Ralph Michell (died 1578), English politician
- Ralph J. Mitchell (1891–1970), U.S. Marine Corps general
