= Antony Murray =

Sir John Antony Jerningham Murray CBE (21 January 1921 – 3 April 2002) was an honorary adviser to the Barbadian Government on matters relating to sugar and trade. He was the eldest son of Captain John Jock Challenger Murray and his wife, Cecilia (née Jerningham), and also grandson of Sir John Murray, the oceanographer. For his services to Barbados and the Barbadian Government he was recognised in Queen Elizabeth’s Honours fourteen years after its independence, being appointed a CBE in the 1980 New Year Honours, and later in the April 1987 Birthday Honours, a knighthood.

Murray was educated at Eton College and went up to Oxford University. After a year there, war was declared and he joined the Grenadier Guards, serving in the 1st and later the 4th Battalion, of which, like his father-in-law, Sir Alec Hardinge, he became adjutant. He served in Europe, in locations from Normandy to the Baltic, and retired with the rank of major.

After the war, Antony worked in the family business, a successful phosphate mining company on Christmas Island in the Indian Ocean, founded by Antony's paternal grandfather, Sir John Murray.

Murray later moved his interests to Barbados. The family had been left the Kendal sugar plantation, one of the oldest and largest on the island. He went on to serve as chairman of the West India Committee, a trade body, between 1963 and 1965, and subsequently as vice-president, and he was appointed an honorary Trade Commissioner by the Barbadian government. This involved him in intricate discussions with the EEC, and he spent some time in Brussels, focusing on the details of complex sugar trade agreements.

In Barbados, Murray helped to establish the Errol Barrow Memorial Trust, which provided scholarships for West Indian students seeking education overseas. He also was responsible for arranging the annual cricket match between his local village team and the Barbadian High Commission.
