= Richard Shepherd (theologian) =

English churchman (1732–1809)

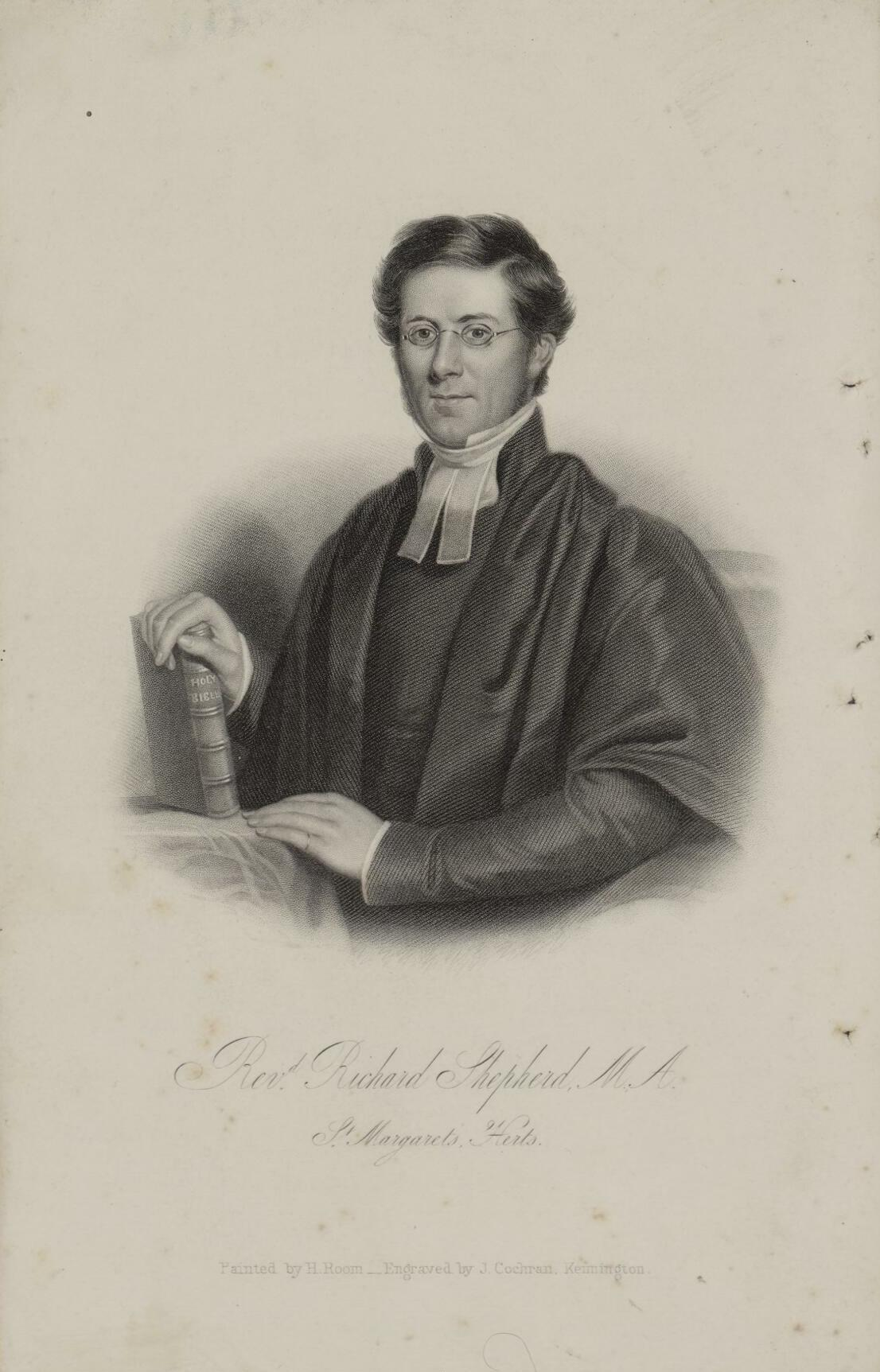
- Born: 1732
- Died: 1809 (aged 76–77)

Richard Shepherd (1732?–1809) was an English churchman, Archdeacon of Bedford in 1783, known also for his verse.

== Life ==
He was son of Henry Shepherd (d. 1764), vicar of Mareham-le-Fen, Lincolnshire, and matriculated from Corpus Christi College, Oxford, on 1 December 1749, at the age of seventeen. He graduated B.A. 1753, M.A. 1757, B.D. 1765, and D.D. 1788, and was elected probationary fellow of his college in 1760.

His first intention was to follow a military life, but he took orders in the Church of England. After residing for many years at Oxford, he became chaplain to Thomas Thurlow, by whose nomination he was installed on 26 July 1783 in the archdeaconry of Bedford. He had been elected Fellow of the Royal Society on 10 May 1781. In 1788 he was Bampton lecturer at Oxford, publishing his lectures as ‘Ground and Credibility of the Christian Religion,’ 1788. ‘Additional Discourses’ thereto were published by him in 1792, and three were republished by his son in 1848, with the title ‘Salvation is of the Jews.’

By the gift of Lord-chancellor Edward Thurlow, 1st Baron Thurlow he was instituted in 1792 to the rectory of Wetherden and Helmingham in Suffolk, and held these preferments until his death at Wetherden, on 3 January 1809, in his seventy-eighth year.

== Works ==
The numerous works of Shepherd included, in addition to sermons and charges:

- ‘Ode to Love’ (anon.), 1756; this was afterwards reissued under the title of ‘The Philologist.’
- ‘Review of a Free Enquiry [by Soame Jenyns] into the Nature and Origin of Evil’ (anon.), 1759; 2nd ed. 1768.
- ‘Odes, Descriptive and Allegorical’ (anon.), 1761.
- ‘The Nuptials, a didactic Poem in three books’ (anon.), 1761.
- ‘Hector, a dramatic Poem’ (anon.), 1770. 6. ‘Bianca, a Tragedy,’ 1772 (most of the above were reprinted in ‘Miscellanies,’ 2 vols. 1776).
- ‘Reflections on Materialism, addressed to Priestley; by Philalethes Rusticans,’ 1779.
- ‘Examination of the Socinian Exposition of the Prefatory Verses of St. John's Gospel,’ 1781.
- ‘Essay on Education, in a Letter to William Jones,’ 1782.
- ‘Polyænus's Stratagems of War,’ translated from the original Greek, 1793; this had been in his desk for more than thirty years, when Lord Cornwallis advised its publication.
- ‘Notes on the Gospel and Epistles of St. John,’ 1796; new ed. 1841, edited by his son.
- ‘The new Boethius; or of the Consolation of Christianity,’ 1806.
- ‘Religious Union perfective, and the support of Civil Union’ (anon.), 1807.
- ‘No False Alarm, or a Sequel to Religious Union,’ 1808.
