= Wetherden =

Village in Suffolk, England

Coordinates: 52.227°N 0.94°E

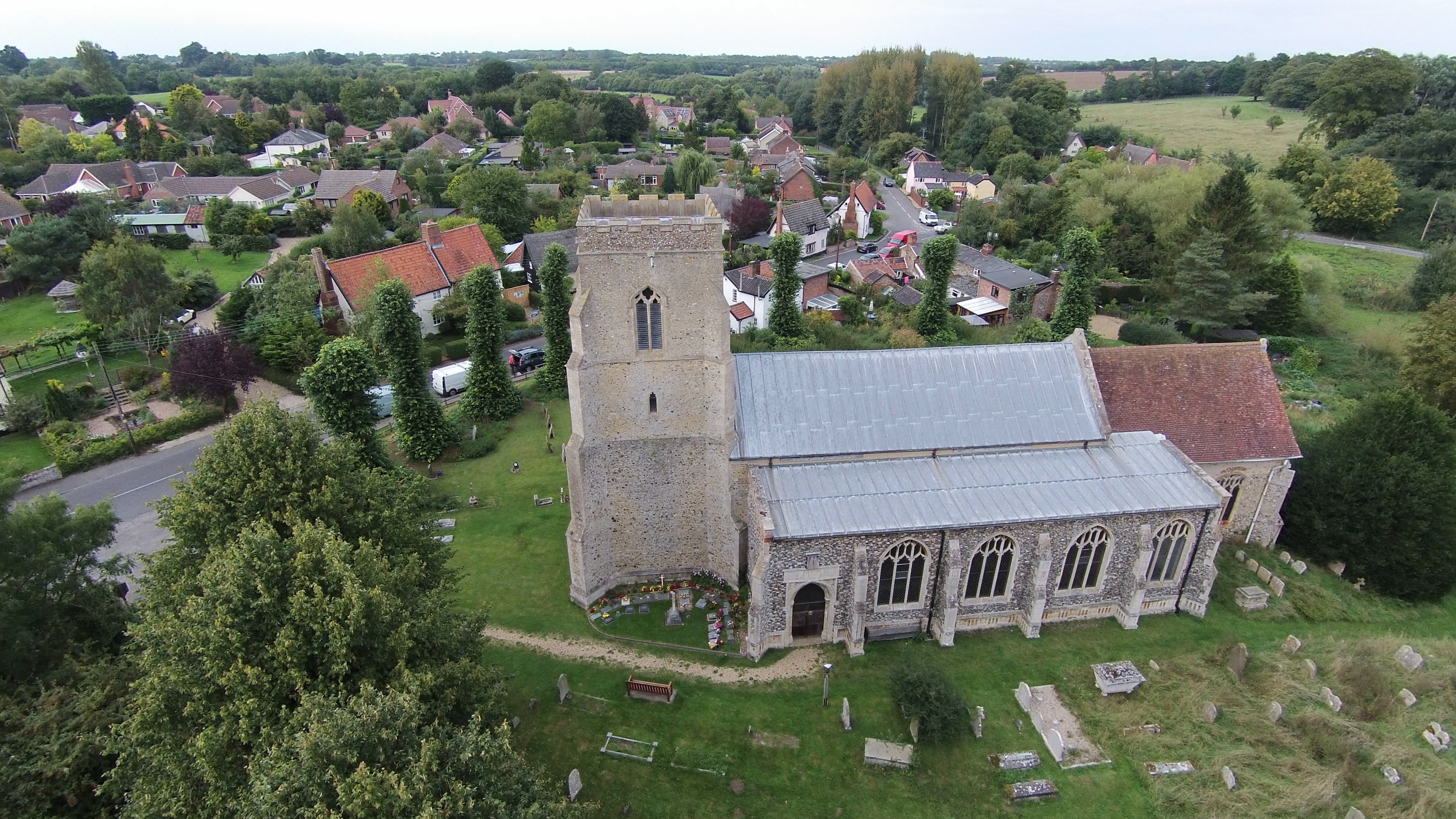
- Wetherden from the air

- Location within Suffolk
- District: Mid Suffolk
- Shire county: Suffolk
- Region: East
- Country: England
- Sovereign state: United Kingdom
- Post town: Stowmarket
- Postcode district: IP14

Wetherden is a village and civil parish in the county of Suffolk, England, situated about 4 miles (6.4 km) northwest of Stowmarket and about 1.25 miles (2.0 km) west of the larger village of Haughley. In 2011 the parish had a population of 540.

== History ==
It was recorded in the 1086 Domesday Book as 'Watdena' or 'Wederdena', the name deriving from old English 'wether' for castrated rams (male sheep) and 'dena' denoting valley.

In the late 16th century the manor of Wetherden was acquired by John Sulyard who built Wetherden Hall to the north east of village - a moated farmhouse now occupies its site at Base Green.

== Buildings ==
Buildings in the village include

- a Grade I listed medieval church, dedicated to Mary

St Mary's Church dates from the 14th century and is listed grade I. It has a late 15th-century roof (hammerbeams in the nave and camber beams in the aisle) and contains tombs to the Sulyard family, who partly funded its construction. It suffered damage during World War II when it was hit by bombs which also killed several village residents. The clock on the tower was erected by public subscription in 2012 to commemorate the Diamond Jubilee of Queen Elizabeth II.

- a Baptist Chapel
- a pub, The Maypole (c. 1530, a Grade II listed building).
- a village hall

A school was established in 1868 catering for over 80 children at its peak, but dwindling numbers led to its closure in 1985, though the building continued to be used as pre-school, catering for under-5s, until 2014.

== Sport ==
The village playing field is home to Wetherden F.C. who play in the Ipswich Sunday football league.

== Notable people ==
- Diarmaid MacCulloch, historian (born 1951) - lived in Wetherden as a boy
- William Robinson (Governor of Hong Kong) (1836-1912) - born in Wetherden.
- Richard Shepherd (theologian) (1732-1809) - rector at Wetherden from 1792 until his death.
- John Sulyard (c. 1518-1575), local landowner, lawyer and politician.
- Michael Tippett (1905-1998), music composer - lived in Wetherden as a boy.
