= Ralph Michell =

16th-century English politician

Ralph Michell (by 1523 – 1578), of Bodmin, Cornwall, was an English politician.

He was a member (MP) of the parliament of England for Bodmin in November 1554.

Parliament of England
Preceded by Henry Chiverton; John Sulyard	Member of Parliament for Bodmin; Nov. 1554; With: John Courtney	Succeeded by Thomas Williams; Humphrey Cavill
