= Michael Bruce (MP) =

British adventurer

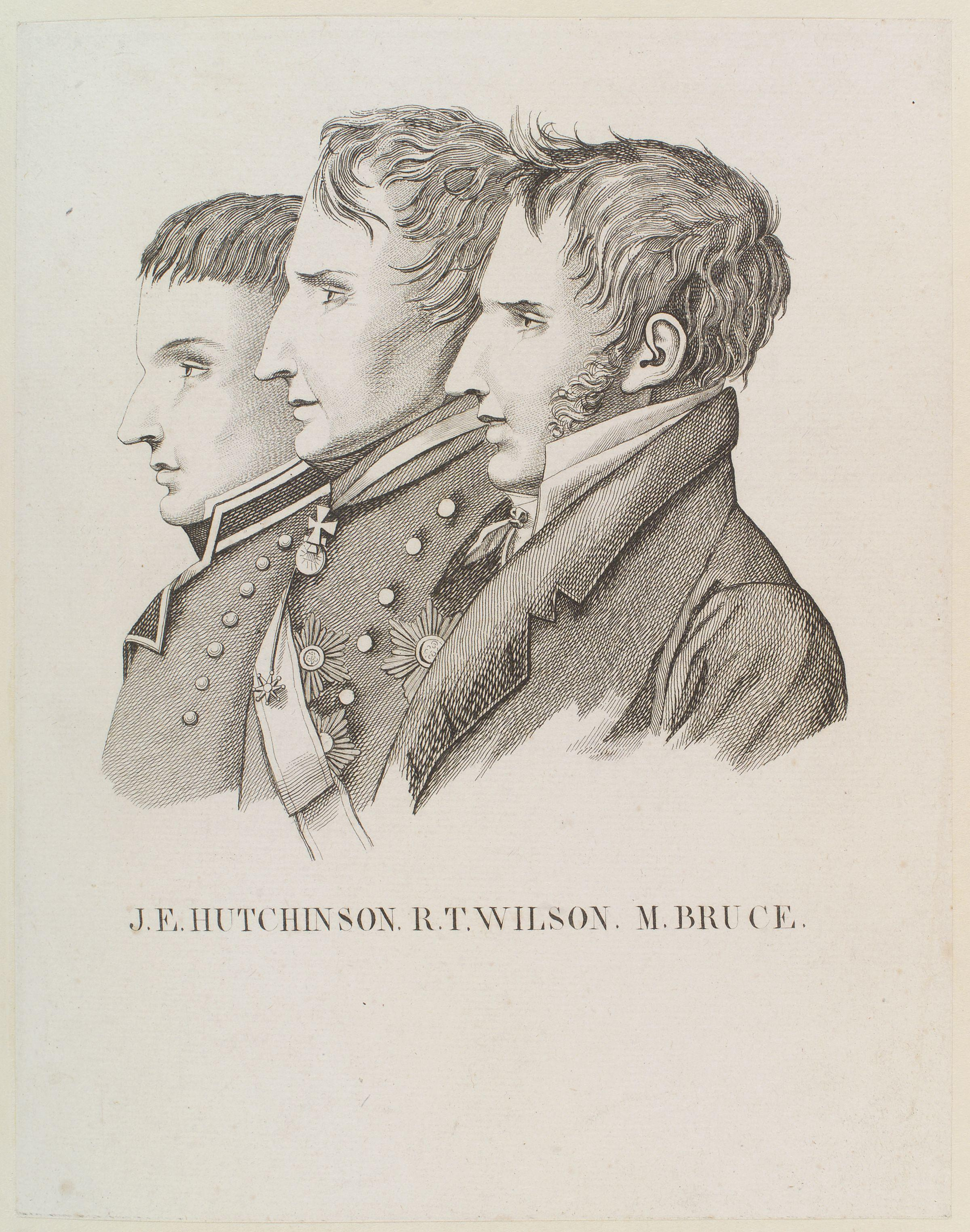
Three defendants at the trial of parties to the escape from France of the Comte de Lavalette, Michael Bruce to the right, with John Hely-Hutchinson, 2nd Earl of Donoughmore (left), and Robert Wilson (centre).

Michael Bruce (1787–1861) was a British adventurer, who gained the nickname "Lavelette Bruce" for his part in smuggling Antoine Marie Chamans, comte de Lavalette out of France at the time of the Bourbon Restoration. He is now largely remembered as a lover of Lady Hester Stanhope. He was a Member of Parliament in 1830–1.

== Life ==
Born in Bombay where his father was a merchant, he was the son of Patrick Craufurd Bruce and his wife Jane Smith, and was educated at Eton College. He matriculated at St John's College, Cambridge in 1806. Later, in 1821, he was admitted to Lincoln's Inn, and was called to the bar in 1826.

Bruce did not complete a degree at Cambridge, after a year or so beginning to travel in Europe. It was during his voyages in the Mediterranean and Near East that he encountered Lady Hester Stanhope, on Malta in 1810. They lived together for three years, spent on trips that included Damascus and Palmyra. They parted in 1813.

Moving to Vienna and then Paris, Bruce took part in the successful plot to smuggle the Comte de Lavalette out of France: he was a supporter of Napoleon condemned by the Bourbons. When Bruce was put on trial for this offence in 1816, he received a sentence of three months. His reputation, however, was not badly sullied, and Lord Palmerston, a college friend, acted as his best man two years later.

Bruce then went in for Whig party politics, as a friend of John Cam Hobhouse, but hampered by the collapse of his father's bank in 1816. In the end the Marquess of Cleveland, who had in recent years moved from the Whigs to supporting the Tory ministry, found him the seat of Ilchester in 1830. His patron then switching to support for reform, Bruce made himself conspicuous for his reluctance to do the same. He was replaced by Cleveland for the 1831 general election, and left public life.
