= Jerningham baronets =

Extinct baronetcy in the Baronetage of England

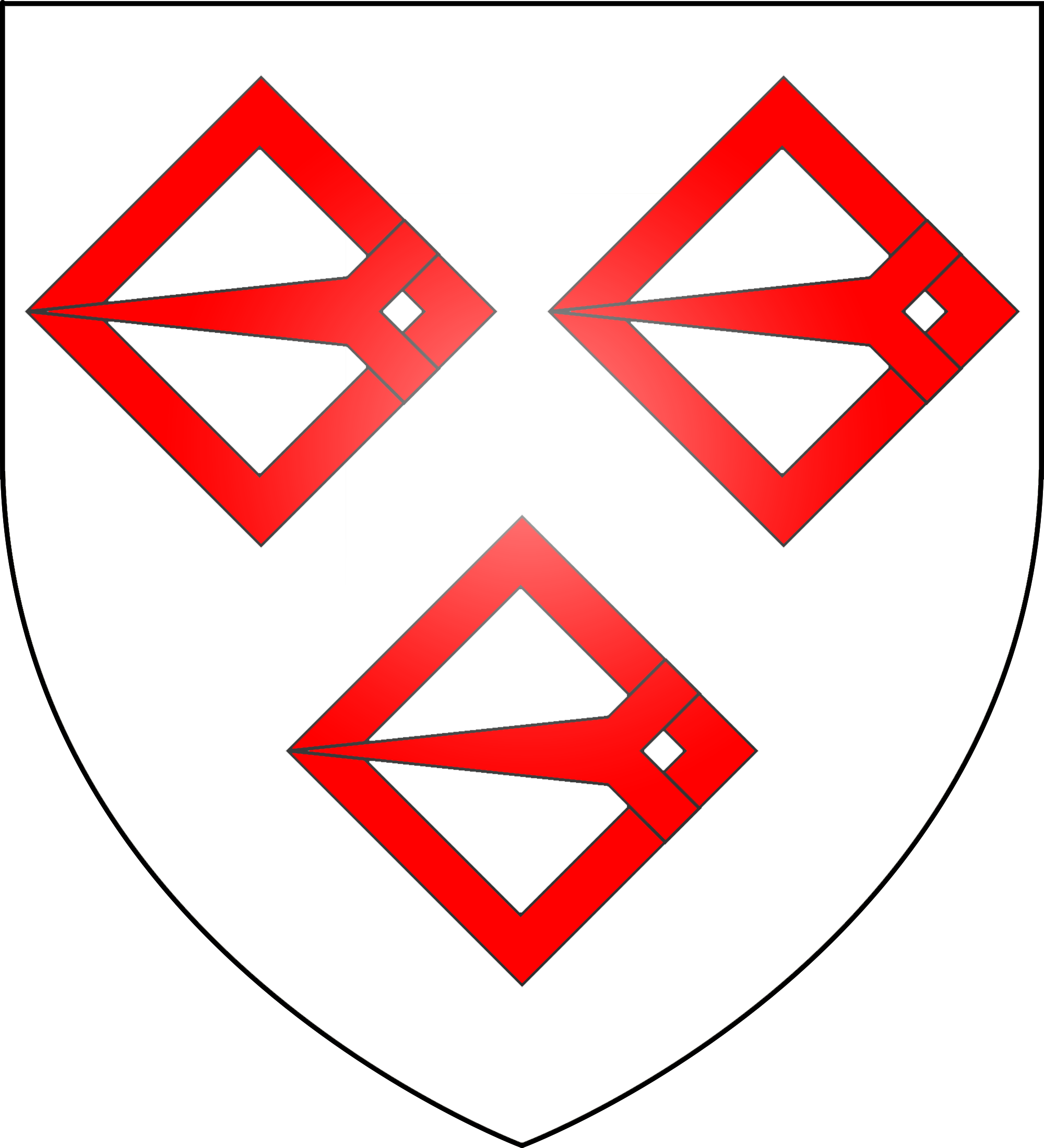
Arms of Jerningham: Argent, three buckles lozengy gules

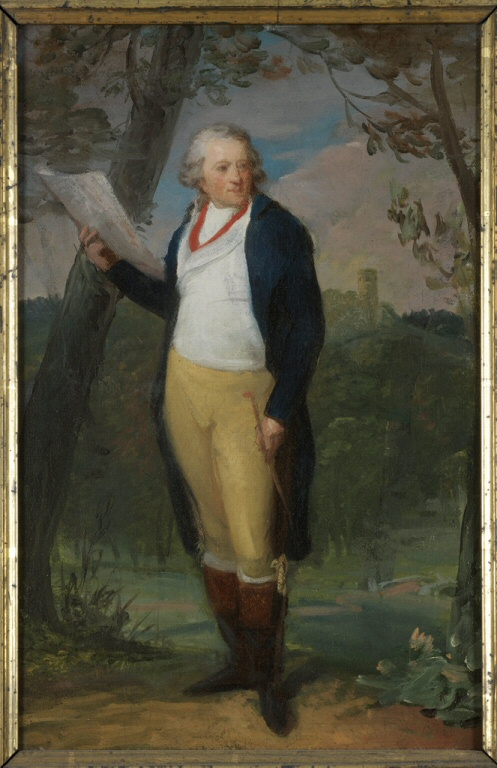
A portrait of Sir William Jerningham, 6th Baronet by Henri-Pierre Danloux

The Jerningham Baronetcy, of Cossey in the County of Norfolk, was a title in the Baronetage of England.

== History ==
The title was created on 16 August 1621 for Henry Jerningham. In 1733 the 5th Baronet married Mary Plowden, only daughter of Mary Plowden, sister of John Paul Stafford-Howard, 4th Earl of Stafford and de jure 5th Baron Stafford (see the Baron Stafford 1640 creation). He was succeeded by his son, the sixth Baron. In 1807 the claim to the barony of Stafford, which had been under attainder since 1680, passed to him through his mother. He died in 1809 when the baronetcy and the claim to the barony passed to his son, the seventh Baronet. He petitioned the House of Lords for a reversal of the attainder of the barony of Stafford and for a writ of summons to Parliament. In 1824 the attainder was reversed and the following year he was summoned to the House of Lords as the eighth Baron Stafford.

He was succeeded by his eldest son, the ninth Baron and eighth Baronet. He represented Pontefract in the House of Commons. He was succeeded by his nephew, the tenth Baron. On the death of the latter's brother, the eleventh Baron and tenth Baronet, the two titles separated. The barony, which could be inherited through female lines, was passed on to the late Baron's nephew Francis Edward Fitzherbert, who became the twelfth Baron. He was the son of Emily Charlotte Fitzherbert (sister of both the tenth and eleventh Baron) and her husband Basil Thomas Fitzherbert (see the Baron Stafford for later history of this title). The baronetcy, which could only be inherited through male lines, was passed on to Henry William Stafford Jerningham, the eleventh Baronet. On his death in 1935 the baronetcy became extinct.

The seat of the Jerningham family was Costessey Hall in Norfolk.

== Jerningham baronets, of Cossey (1621) ==
- Sir Henry Jerningham, 1st Baronet (died 1646), married Eleanor Throckmorton (see Throckmortons of Coughton)
- Sir Henry Jerningham, 2nd Baronet (c. 1620–1680) (grandson of the 1st Baronet – son of John, eldest son of the 1st Baronet, and Anne, sister to Henry Moore, 1st Baronet), married Mary Hall
- Sir Francis Jerningham, 3rd Baronet (c. 1650–1730) (son of the 2nd Baronet), married Anne Blount (daughter of Sir George Blount, of Sodington, 2nd Baronet)
- Sir John Jerningham, 4th Baronet (1678–1737) (eldest son of the 3rd Baronet), married Margaret Bedingfield (daughter of Sir Henry Bedingfield, of Oxborough, Baronet), died without issue
- Sir George Jerningham, 5th Baronet (1680–1774) (younger brother of the 4th Baronet), married Mary Plowden, daughter and heiress of Francis Plowden, Comptroller of the Household to James II and VII and James III and VIII, by his wife, Mary, daughter and in her issue heiress of the Hon. John Stafford-Howard, younger son of William (Howard), Viscount Stafford
- Sir William Jerningham, 6th Baronet (1736–1809) (son of the 5th Baronet), would have been 7th Baron Stafford but for the attainder, which was reversed in 1824; married Frances Dillon, daughter of the 11th Viscount Dillon (and descendant of King Charles II)
- George William Jerningham, 8th Baron Stafford, 7th Baronet (1771–1851) (eldest son of the 6th Baronet), was restored as eighth Baron Stafford in 1824; married Frances-Henrietta Sulyarde and later Elizabeth Caton, sister-in-law of Francis D'Arcy-Osborne, 7th Duke of Leeds and Richard Wellesley, 1st Marquess Wellesley
- Henry Valentine Stafford-Jerningham, 9th Baron Stafford, 8th Baronet (1802–1884) (eldest son of the 7th Baronet), married Julia Howard, 2nd daughter of Edward Charles Howard and niece of the 12th Duke of Norfolk; had no issue
- Augustus Frederick Fitzherbert Stafford-Jerningham, 10th Baron Stafford, 9th Baronet (1830–1892) (nephew of the 8th Baronet – son of Edward, second son of the 7th Baronet), died unmarried
- Fitzherbert Stafford-Jerningham, 11th Baron Stafford, 10th Baronet (1833–1913) (younger brother of the 9th Baronet)
- Sir Henry William Stafford Jerningham, 11th Baronet (1867–1935)

== See also ==
- Baron Stafford (1640 creation)
