= John Sulyard =

16th-century English politician

Sir John Sulyard (by 1518 – 1575), of Wetherden and Haughley, Suffolk, was a prominent East Anglian magistrate, landowner, High Sheriff, knight and standard-bearer, strongly Roman Catholic in religious affiliation, who sat in parliament during the reign of Queen Mary I.

== Sulyard of Wetherden ==
Sir John Sulyard, a Justice of the Court of King's Bench, (the present subject's grandfather) is thought to have acquired the manor of Wetherden Hall (which had formerly belonged to Roger de Scales) in 1463 by fine, from Walter Bradley and his wife Joan: in 1468 he had a grant of free warren in it. His Hall, of which two truncated 15th century timber ranges survive in a much-remodelled farmhouse, stood at the moated site near to what is now Wetherden Hall Farm. It is observed that he was tutor to Prince Edward from 1473 until the boy's disappearance in 1483, and received the favour of Richard III, and that Wetherden was near to Gipping, seat of Sir James Tyrrell, who was apparently implicated in the prince's death.

The judge first married Agnes (daughter of Richard Hungate), by whom he had sons Edward (of High Laver, Essex, died c. 1495) and William, and daughter Elizabeth. Secondly he married Anne, daughter and coheir of John and Elizabeth Andrews of Baylham, Suffolk, and by her he had sons Andrew and John, and daughters Elizabeth, Anne and Alice, the uterine cousins of Sir Andrew Wyndsore of Stanwell, Middlesex (whose father Thomas Wyndsore married their mother's sister Elizabeth Andrews).

At Sir John's death in March 1487/88, he founded the Sulyard chantry in the "spectacular" south aisle which he had commenced building at St Mary's Church, Wetherden. Its roof has been called "a riot of heraldry... a complete record of the Sulyard family's formidable gentry connections up to 1488." After 1488 Dame Anne remarried to Sir Thomas Bourchier of Knebworth, who died in 1491, and she survived until 1520. Dame Anne completed the south aisle with the porch, adding heraldry from her second marriage to Bourchier.

The manor passed by remainder to Dame Anne, and from her to her son Andrew Sulyard, Esquire of the Body to Henry VIII. Andrew married Margaret, daughter of John Lyston, but died without issue in 1538. His brother John married Margaret, daughter of Robert Baker of Wetherden, and they were the parents of John Sulyard the present subject. At his death in 1539 the father John asked to be buried at Wetherden near to the graves of his father and mother, and arranged for prayers for his late wife Margaret. He made his son John Sulyard his principal legatee and his executor together with Sir William Drury of Hawstead.

== Life ==
John Sulyard was educated as a lawyer at Clifford’s Inn. He married three times. His first wife was Elizabeth Bedingfield, daughter of the younger Sir Edmund Bedingfield (1479-1553) of Oxborough, Norfolk, by whom he had one daughter. He succeeded his father in 1540, and by the following year he had married his second wife, Elizabeth Jerningham, daughter of Sir John Jerningham of Somerleyton, Suffolk and his wife Bridget, daughter of Sir Robert Drury of Hawstead; they had two sons and two daughters. (Elizabeth's sister Anne Jerningham was the wife of Sir Thomas Cornwallis, whose mother was the daughter of Edward Sulyard of High Laver.) His third wife was Alice Carvell, daughter of Humphrey Carvell (Kervill) of Wiggenhall St. Mary, Norfolk. Alice was the widow of John Bedingfield of Quidenham (died 1546/47), son of Peter Bedingfield, a son of the elder Sir Edmund Bedingfield K.B. (died 1496/97), the builder of Oxburgh Hall.

Sulyard was with the Marquess of Northampton and others, including Sir Henry Bedingfield, Sir William Waldegrave, Sir John Cutts and Sir Thomas Cornwallis, to attack and suppress the rebels at Norwich during Kett's Rebellion in 1549. He maintained his allegiance to the Roman Catholic faith and to the succession of Queen Mary, and this was the foundation of his public career, which was mostly encompassed within Mary's reign. He was with the Earl of Bath, Sir Henry Bedingfield, Henry Jerningham, Clement Higham and others who rallied to Mary's support in Kenninghall, Norfolk on 12 July 1553, during the succession crisis surrounding Lady Jane Grey, in preparation for Mary's journey to London: their swift loyalty to her was decisive in bringing her to the throne. A family tradition alleged that Mary had rested one night at Wetherden Hall on her way from Kenninghall to Framlingham.

Sulyard was elected a Member of Parliament for Ipswich in October 1553, in the parliament for which Henry Bedingfield and Henry Jerningham were Knights of the Shire, and Thomas Cornwallis the sheriff of Ipswich. He was appointed gentleman pensioner and standard bearer late in 1553, in which he remained until the end of Mary's reign. In the parliament of Spring 1554, following Wyatt's rebellion, Sir Clement Higham replaced him at Ipswich, and Sulyard sat for Bodmin, and for Preston in November 1554. From that year he served as a Justice of the Peace in Suffolk until 1561.

The manor and park of Haughley, with lands and liberties in Haughley, Stowmarket, Newton, Bacton, Wetherden, Shelland and Harleston, and all park liberties, were granted or confirmed to him in fee in June 1554 by Queen Mary in gratitude for his loyalty towards her. This manor was anciently associated with Haughley Castle and the lordship of Hugh de Montfort. (While it became the Sulyards's principal seat, the great mansion which stands at Haughley Park today was built around 1620, and was remodelled during the 19th century.)

He sat again for parliament representing Ipswich in 1555, and was appointed High Sheriff of Norfolk and Suffolk for 1555–56. Various accounts of his judgements and actions in that year are recorded. John Foxe reported (in his 1563 edition) that Sir John Sulyard and Sir John Tyrrell of Gipping Hall stirred up a persecution in the towns of Winston and Mendlesham. They commanded Thomas Spicer to attend Mass and to receive the sacrament, and at his refusal had imprisoned him at Eye. On 21 May 1556 he, with two men of Beccles, John Denny and William Poole, all having been condemned the previous day, were burned there as heretics by Sir John Sulyard:

"Wherat many murmured, and thought he went beyond his commission, in that he put them to death without a writte from the lord Chauncelor of England, for his warraunt, which in so short time could not be obteyned, the said Chauncelour being then at London, which is at least lxxx myle from that place. As they were at the stake, and had prayd lad to heare you saye, you do beleve the Catholick church. That is the beast word I hard of you yet: to which his saings William Pole answered, that though they beleve the Catholike church, yet do they not beleve in theyr Popish church, which is no parte of christes Catholick church, and therfore no parte of ther belefe."

Knighted in March 1557/January 1558, Sulyard's final term in parliament was for Chippenham in 1558. With Elizabeth's accession, and the reversal of religious policy, his maintenance of Roman Catholic worship took on the character of recusancy. He served as a commissioner of the sewers for Norfolk and Suffolk in 1566. His name appears high in a list of English Catholics, along with his kinsmen Sir Thomas Cornwallis of Brome and Sir Henry Bedingfield, and Sir Ralph Chamberlain of Gedding, among the senior knights of Suffolk, compiled in 1574 probably for use in connection with the cause of Mary, Queen of Scots. He made his will as from Quidenham in 1569, requesting burial among his ancestors at Wetherden church, and granting his estates to his sons Edward and Thomas. For executors he appointed his widow Alice and her son Humphrey Bedingfield, his son Edward Sulyard and his son-in-law Thomas Tirrell, requiring them to enter into bonds.

== Death and monument ==
Sir John Sulyard's will was proved by his son Edward Sulyard on 1 November 1575. He was survived by his widow Alice, who left Haughley Hall to live with her son Humphrey Bedingfield at Quidenham, where she died in 1577.

Sir John was buried with his ancestors in the south aisle of Wetherden church. His monument, somewhat mutilated by William Dowsing, takes the form of an altar-tomb of pale veined marble, the frontal divided into three panel sections, each displaying a large shield with heraldic quarterings, framed by four fluted pilasters, with an entablature with projecting cornice above. This supports a table top of dark figured marble with a Latin inscription on the chamfered edge. Above this, the wallpiece contains in the lower register a frieze of Sir John Sulyard (sinister) and his three wives, kneeling, in bas-relief, all facing to sinister, flanked at either end by a pair of square plinths with mouldings set forwards. These support two tall pale and reddish-veined marble columns with capitals of the Corinthian order, which frame a central panel containing an escutcheon and crest with foliate surrounds, in carved relief in polychrome. This surmounts four smaller escutcheons similarly carved and painted and bearing impalements or quarterings, presented in a row. Above the main armorial feature, which is set within its own frame of scrolled strapwork terminals, is an upper horizontal entablature of veined marble with a deeply projecting cornice moulding supporting a pediment above.

Heraldry

The principal escutcheon on Sulyard's tomb corresponds to the arms Quarterly of 8 as described in the 1561 Visitation, as follows:
1: (Sulyard). Argent, a chevron Gules between three pheons Sable.
2: (Faynforde). Azure, three bars nebulee, Or.
3: (Bacon). Gules, on a chief Argent, two mullets pierced Sable.
4: (Goode) Gules, a chevron Or, between three lions rampant Argent
5: (Andrewes). Argent, on a bend cotised Sable, three mullets of the field.
6: (Weyland). Ermine, on a cross Gules, five escallops Or.
7: (Burnavill). Gules, a rose Or.
8. (Stratton). Argent, on a cross sable, five bezants.
Crest: A stag's head couped Proper attired Or.

The four smaller escutcheons below show quarterings for:
(a) (sinister) Sulyard quarterly of 8 as above
(b) 1 & 4: (Bedingfield) Ermine an eagle displayed Gules; 2 & 3: (Sydenham) Paly bendy Argent and Gules.
(c) 1 & 4: (Jerningham of Somerleyton) Argent three buckles lozengy Gules; 2 & 3: (Fitz Osborne) Gules, three bars gemelles Or, a canton Argent.
(d) (dexter) 1 & 4: (Carvell) Gules, a chevron Or between three lions' faces Argent
These therefore represent Sir John Sulyard and his three wives, and correspond to the four kneeling figures positioned beneath them.

In literature

Sir John became the subject of a Victorian novelette, Wetherden Hall: an historical tale of the days of Queen Mary, by Arthur Brown, curate of Wetherden, published in 1867.

== Family ==
By his first wife, Elizabeth daughter of Sir Edmund Bedingfield junr, Sir John Sulyard had a daughter

- Frances Sulyard, married (1) Thomas Garneys of Kenton, Suffolk (who died in 1566), and (2), in 1567, John Lentall.

By his second wife, Elizabeth daughter of Sir John Jerningham of Somerleyton, he had two sons and two daughters

- Edward Sulyard (died 1605) married (1) Anne (died 1578), daughter and heir of Thomas Heydon of Raynham, and (2) Frances, daughter of Sir Thomas Dawney, and widow of Sir William Bapthorpe (who died in 1580). Buried at Wetherden. Edward Sulyard suffered as a recusant and made a declaration of loyalty, as follows:
  "I, Edward Sulyarde, of Suff., Esquier, doe acknowledge our most gratious Sov'eigne, Ladie Queene Elizabeth, to be our undoubted lawfull and onlie Queene of Englande and Irlande, and no other forreyne Prince, notwithstandinge any Excommunication, under whose Power are all Persons, both Ecclesiasticall and Temporall, within any her Majestie's Dominions. And also by this doe manifest myselfe bounden and readie, as becometh a true and duetifull Subject, with Body, Lands and Goodds, to defend her Highness against the force of any Prince, Pope, Potentate, Prelate, or whatothersoever her Maiestie's Enemies, which God graunt she may overcome, and longe contynue her prosperous Raigne over us. Written in the xxiiijth of October, 1588. By me Edwarde Sulyarde."
- Thomas Sulyard (died 1612), married Bridget, daughter of Francis Mannock of Stoke-by-Nayland. Buried at Grundisburgh.
- Margaret Sulyard (baptized 1542), married in 1565 to Thomas Tyrrell of Heron, Essex. Her portrait, attributed to John Bettes the Younger, was sold by Sotheby's in 1986.
- Anne Sulyard (died 1558), in 1556 married Sir John Tirrell of Gipping (who died 1601). Buried at Wetherden.

By his third wife, Alice Carvell, he had no issue.

Parliament of England
Preceded by John Smith alias Dyer; Richard Bryde alias Byrde	Member of Parliament for Ipswich; Oct. 1553; With: John Gosnold	Succeeded by Clement Heigham; Thomas Poley
Preceded by Ralph Goodwin; John Smith alias Dyer	Member of Parliament for Ipswich; 1555; With: Richard Smart	Succeeded by William Wheatcroft; Philip Williams
Preceded by Henry Chiverton; Thomas Mildmay	Member of Parliament for Bodmin; Apr. 1554; With: Henry Chiverton	Succeeded by John Courtenay; Ralph Mitchell
Preceded by Thomas Ruthall; Willielmus Berners	Member of Parliament for Preston; Nov. 1554; With: Richard Shyrburne	Succeeded by John Arundell; John Herle
Preceded by Nicholas Snell; John Pollard	Member of Parliament for Chippenham; 1558; With: William Neville	Succeeded by Edward Baynard; Nicholas Snell
