= John Bettes the Elder =

English painter

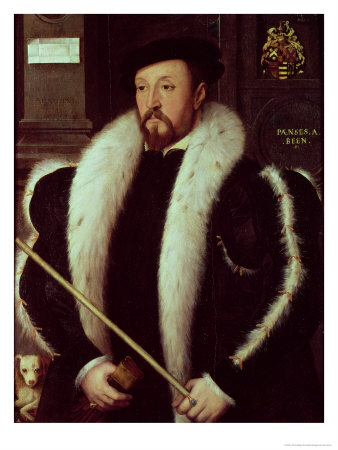
Portrait of Thomas Wentworth, 1st Baron Wentworth, 1549, attributed to John Bettes the Elder

John Bettes the Elder (active c. 1531–1570) was an English artist whose few known paintings date from between about 1543 and 1550. His most famous work is his Portrait of a Man in a Black Cap. His son, John Bettes the Younger (with whom he is sometimes confused), was a pupil of Nicholas Hilliard who painted portraits during the reigns of Elizabeth I and James I.

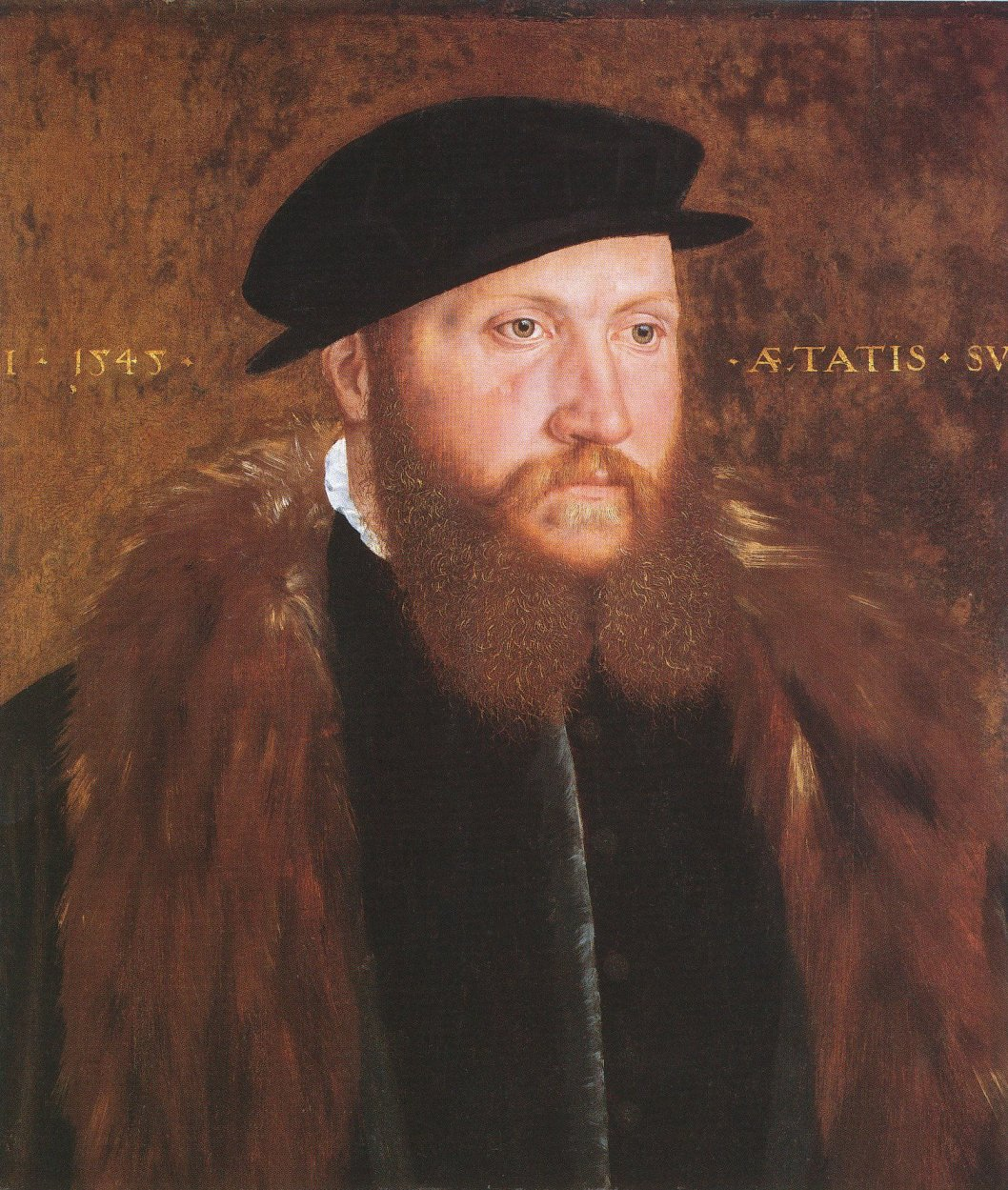
Man in a Black Cap, 1545.

Nothing is known of John Bettes's life, except that he was living in Westminster in 1556, according to a documented court case. He is first recorded as working for Henry VIII at Whitehall Palace in 1531. Queen Catherine Parr's accounts for 1546/47 record payments to Bettes for "lymning" (painting in miniature) the king's and queen's portraits, and for six other portraits. Her new year's gift of 1547 to Prince Edward was a pair of portraits of the king and herself. Bettes has been identified as the designer of the engraved title-border for William Cuningham's Cosmographical Glasse, printed by John Day in 1559. He may also be the designer of engravings for Edward Hall's Chronicle, published in 1550, and of a woodcut portrait of Franz Burchard, the Saxon ambassador to England, published in 1560. In 1576, John Foxe referred to Bettes as already dead. An earlier second edition of Foxe's Actes and Monuments printed in 1570 refers to Bettes's death.

The identification of John Bettes's work stems from the inscription on the back of Man in a Black Cap: "faict par Johan Bettes Anglois" ("done by John Bettes, Englishman"). The painting is dated 1545 on the front. On the basis of its style, four further portraits have been attributed to Bettes: two of Thomas Wentworth, 1st Baron Wentworth, (1549); one of Sir William Butts the Younger (154/3?); and one of Sir William Cavendish (c. 1545).

== Style ==
Man in a Black Cap's technique is reminiscent of Hans Holbein the Younger's, suggesting that Bettes may have worked with Holbein as part of his workshop. Nothing, however, is known of Holbein's workshop other than paintings seemingly associated with it. Holbein does not appear to have founded a school, and Bettes is the only artist whose work reveals his technical influence. For example, he paints over a pink priming, as did Holbein. According to art historian Roy Strong, "He is the artist who, on grounds of style, has the best claim to have worked under Holbein". On the other hand, Bettes's style is distinct from Holbein's; he paints fur more loosely and the beard more flatly than the German artist. In the view of art historian Susan Foister, on the evidence of this portrait, Bettes is "unlikely to have assisted" Holbein.

The recording of an artist's name on a painting is rare in this period. The addition of Bettes' nationality suggests that Man in a Black Cap may have been painted abroad. Since the work's creation, the blue smalt pigment of the background has turned brown; the painting has also been cut down along the sides and bottom, with the inscription reaffixed to the back. It has been speculated that the portrait may be of Edmund Butts, the brother of the William Butts whom Bettes painted. Both were sons of William Butts, a court physician whose portrait Holbein painted in 1543.
