= John Bettes the Younger =

English painter

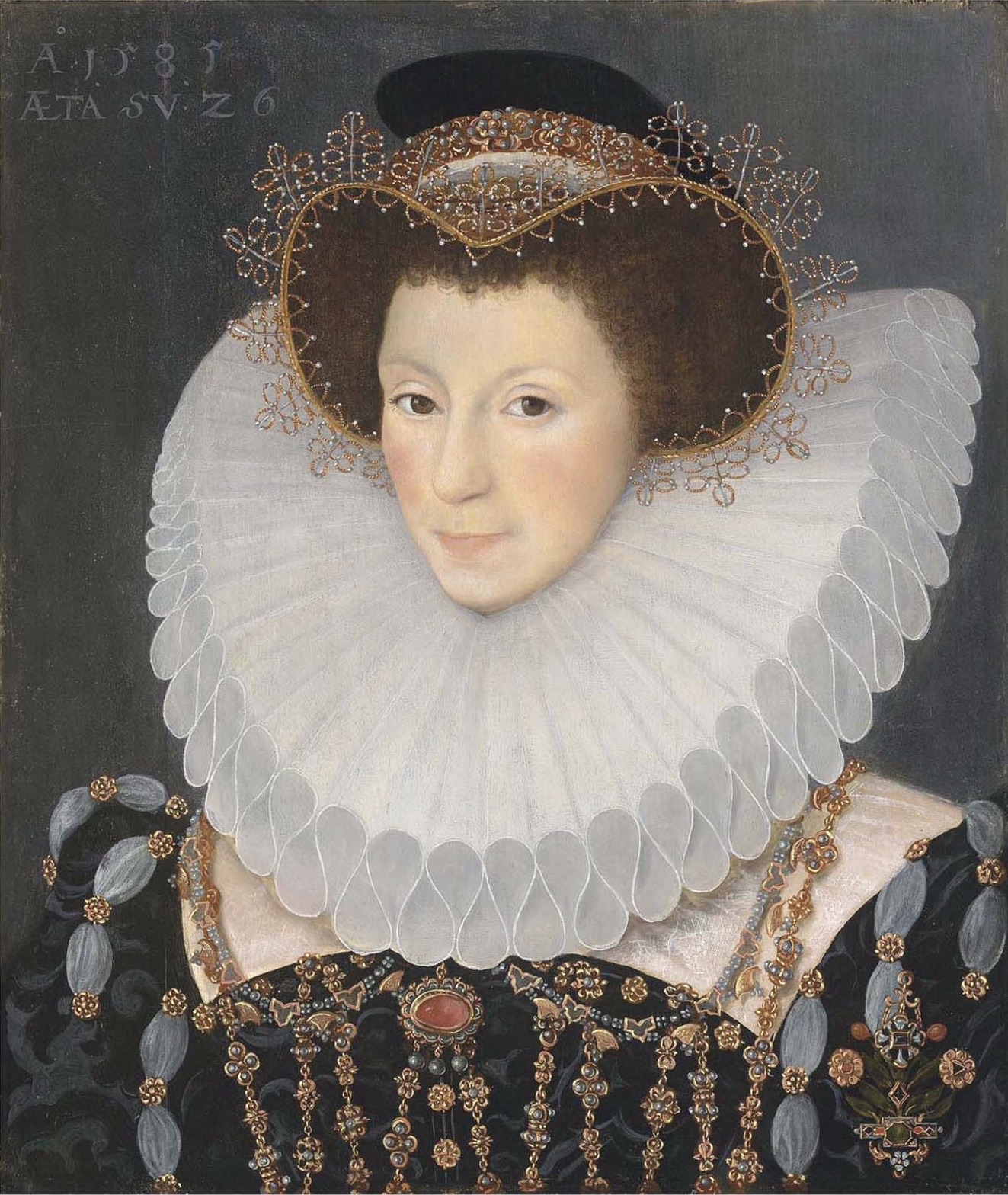
Attributed to John Bettes the Younger, Portrait of a Lady, 1585

John Bettes the Younger (died 1616) was an English portrait painter.

His father, the painter John Bettes the Elder died in, or before 1570. Like Isaac Oliver and Rowland Lockey, Bettes the Younger is believed to have studied under Nicholas Hilliard. He lived in London on Grub Street in St Giles, Cripplegate. In later years he moved to the parish of St Gregory-by-St Pauls.

A miniature portrait of Francis Walsingham, who was buried at St Gregory's Church in 1590, in the possession of the Duke of Buccleuch is attributed to Bettes. John Bettes and his studio are thought to have made a number of portraits of Elizabeth I.

His wife may have been Magdalen Browne of St Gregory's parish. They married on 1 December 1571. A son, Thomas Bettes, died in August 1593, and a daughter Judith was born in July 1599. Bettes' first wife died, and he married Ellianor Harman on 8 September 1614. John Bettes died in January 1616 and bequeathed his son (also John) a picture of John Bettes the Elder, two easels, and a porphyry slab and muller for grinding pigments.

== See also ==
- English art

== Footnotes ==
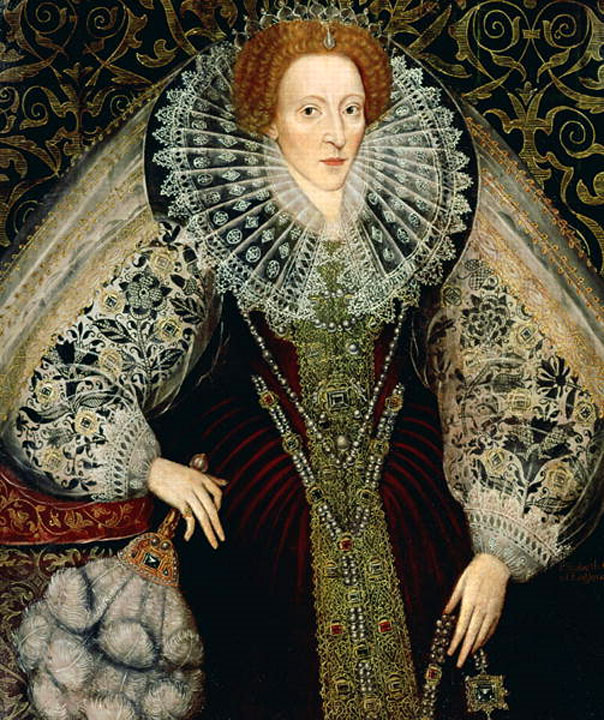
One of five portraits of Elizabeth I of England attributed to John Bettes the Younger or his studio, c. 1585–90
