= Henry Chiverton =

16th-century English politician

Henry Chiverton (1511 – 1574/81), of Bodmin, Lanivet, and Trehunsey in Quethiock, Cornwall, was an English politician.

He was a Member (MP) of the Parliament of England for Bodmin in 1545, 1547, October 1553 and April 1554; for Cornwall in March 1553, November 1554 and 1555, for Liskeard in 1559 and for Dunheved in 1563.
