= Henry Stafford-Jerningham, 9th Baron Stafford =

British peer and politician

The Right Honourable The Baron Stafford DL
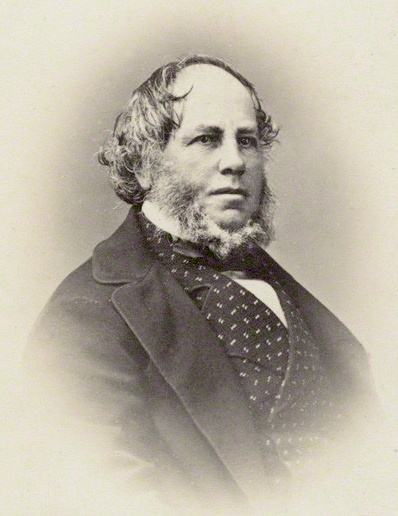

Member of Parliament for Pontefract
- In office 1830–1834
- Preceded by: Thomas Houldsworth; Le Gendre Starkie
- Succeeded by: John Gully; Viscount Pollington

Personal details
- Born: Henry Valentine Stafford-Jerningham; 2 January 1802
- Died: 30 November 1884 (aged 82) Costessey Park, Norfolk
- Party: Whig
- Spouses: Julia Barbara Howard (m. 1829; died 1856) Emma Eliza Gerard (m. 1859)
- Relations: George Jerningham (brother)
- Parent(s): George Stafford-Jerningham, 8th Baron Stafford; Frances Henrietta Sulyarde
- Education: Magdalene College, Cambridge

Henry Valentine Stafford-Jerningham, 9th Baron Stafford DL (2 January 1802 – 30 November 1884), known as Henry Jerningham until 1824 and styled The Honourable Henry Stafford-Jerningham between 1824 and 1851, was a British peer and politician.

== Background ==
Stafford was the son of George Stafford-Jerningham, 8th Baron Stafford, and Frances Henrietta Sulyarde, daughter of Edward Sulyarde of Haughley Park. His father had succeeded as seventh Baronet of Costessey in 1809. After his mother's death in 1832, his father married Elizabeth Caton, second daughter Richard Caton and Mary Carroll Caton (a daughter of Charles Carroll of Carrollton).

In 1821, Henry was admitted to Magdalene College, Cambridge. In 1824, his father managed to obtain a reversal of the attainder of the barony of Stafford (the attainder had been imposed on his ancestor William Howard, 1st Viscount Stafford and 1st Baron Stafford in 1680). The family assumed by Royal licence the additional surname of Stafford at the same time.

== Political career ==
Stafford was returned as a Whig to Parliament for Pontefract at the 1830 general election, a seat he held until the dissolution of Parliament in December 1834; he did not stand again at the 1835 general election. In 1851 he succeeded his father in the barony and entered the House of Lords.

== Personal life ==
Lord Stafford was twice married. He married firstly Julia Barbara Howard on 12 February 1829. Julia was the second daughter of Elizabeth (née Maycock) Howard (daughter of William Maycock) and Edward Charles Howard, a younger brother of Bernard Howard, 12th Duke of Norfolk.

After her death in November 1856, he married secondly to Emma Eliza Gerard on 12 September 1859. Emma was a daughter of Frederick Sewallis Gerard and Mary Anne (née Wilkinson) Gerard (daughter of Rev. Thomas Wilkinson).

He died at the family seat of Costessey Park, Norfolk, in November 1884, aged 82, and was succeeded in the barony and baronetcy by his nephew, Augustus Frederick Fitzherbert Stafford-Jerningham. After his death, Lady Stafford remarried to Basil Thomas Fitzherbert (father of Edward Fitzherbert, 13th Baron Stafford from his first marriage), before her death in November 1912.

Parliament of the United Kingdom
Preceded by Thomas Houldsworth; Le Gendre Starkie	Member of Parliament for Pontefract; 1830–1834; With: Sir Culling Eardley Smith, Bt 1830–1831; The Earl of Mexborough 1831–1832; John Gully 1832–1834	Succeeded by John Gully; Viscount Pollington
Baronetage of England
Preceded by George Stafford-Jerningham	Baronet (of Cossey); 1851–1884	Succeeded by Augustus Stafford-Jerningham
Peerage of England
Preceded by George Stafford-Jerningham	Baron Stafford; 1851–1884	Succeeded by Augustus Stafford-Jerningham
