= Costessey Hall =

Manor house in Norfolk, England

Coordinates: 52.6565°N 1.1970°E

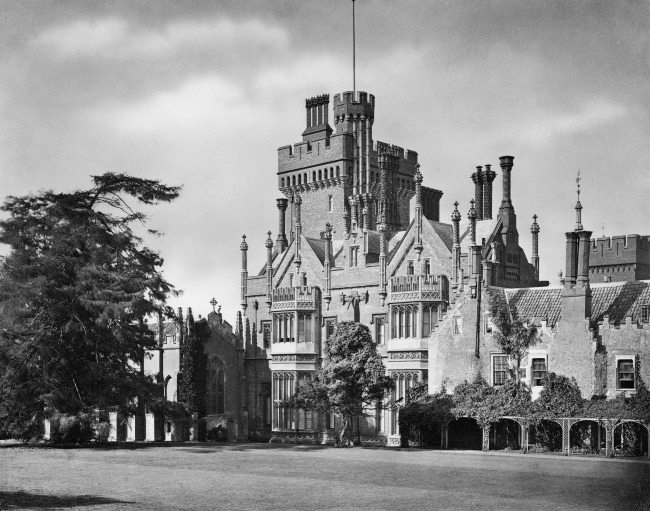
Costessey Hall in its prime

Costessey Hall (pronounced and sometimes spelt Cossey Hall, also written as Cotesby Hall) was a manor house in Costessey, Norfolk, England, four miles west of Norwich.

== History ==
The first mention of the hall dates it to circa 1086, when William the Conqueror gave it to Alan Rufus, Earl of Richmond. It was then described as Costessey Manor.

In 1555, Mary I awarded it to Sir Henry Jerningham, for his support for Mary on the contested accession of Lady Jane Grey. It then had 22 sub-manors in Norfolk, plus manors in Hereford and Gloucestershire. Jerningham built a new manor house on the south side of the River Tud flowing through Costessey. The original manor house remained on the north side of the river and is still standing in Costessey Park. It may have been granted to Anne of Cleves by her husband Henry VIII.

From 1826 to 1836, John Chessell Buckler built a Gothic castle for Lord Stafford Jerningham, which was several times larger than the original Tudor hall.

=== Demolition ===
In 1913, the contents of the house were sold, and the hall was left empty. At the start of World War I, it was commandeered by the War Office. In 1919, it was decided to demolish the hall. The house was demolished in 1925. The belfry block by the 18th fairway of the Costessey Park Golf Course is all that remains.

== See also ==
- Costessey
