= Haughley Park =

Grade I listed building in Mid Suffolk, United Kingdom

Coordinates: 52.2190°N 0.9329°E

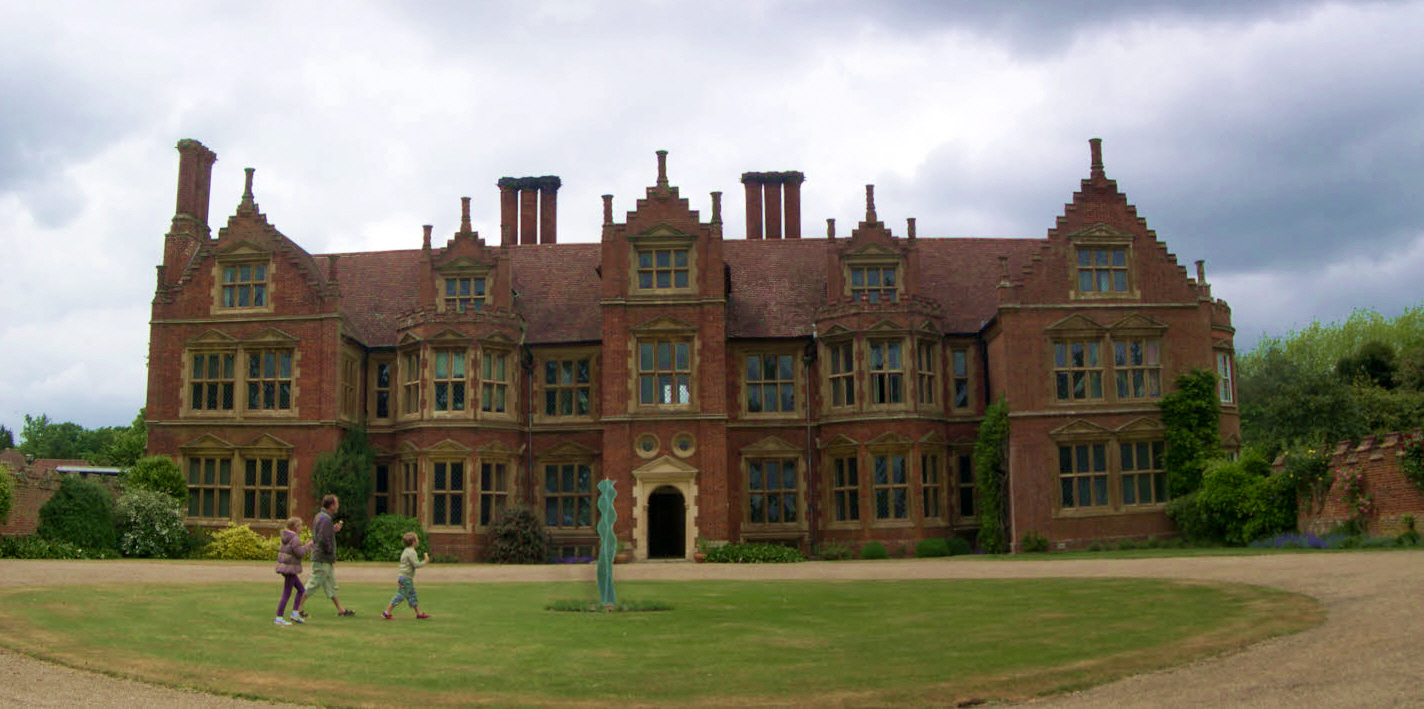
Haughley Hall

Haughley Park House in Stowmarket, Suffolk is an historical house of significance listed in the English Heritage Register. It is a large red brick country house built in about 1620 for the Sulyard family who were very prominent landowners in this area. The property remained with this family for two centuries after which it was sold. Today it is a private residence but at certain times of the year the gardens are open for viewing. The barn and gardens are also available for weddings.

== Sulyard family ==
The site of a royal hunting ground attached to Haughley Castle, the land was granted by Henry VIII to Charles Brandon, Duke of Suffolk, who later surrendered it to the Crown. The land was then granted to Sir John Sulyard by Queen Mary because of the loyalty he had shown when she was deposed. John was a staunch Catholic and the only existing painting of him in the Palmer Family Collection shows him to be a formidable character. The house was subsequently built in the reign of King James I and generations of Sulyards lived there until the end of the 18th century. The last male heir was Edward Sulyard. Although he married twice, he had no sons, and when he died in 1799 he left his property to his three daughters.

== Jerninghams ==
Edward Sulyard daughter Frances married George Jerningham, the eldest son and heir of Sir William Jerningham of Costessey Hall in Norfolk a few months after her father's death. The couple decided to live at Haughley Park for the next decade.

The couple lived at Haughley Hall until 1809 when George inherited his father's title and estate. They then moved to the Jerningham family seat of Costessey Hall and Frances lived there for the rest of her life.

== Crawford family ==
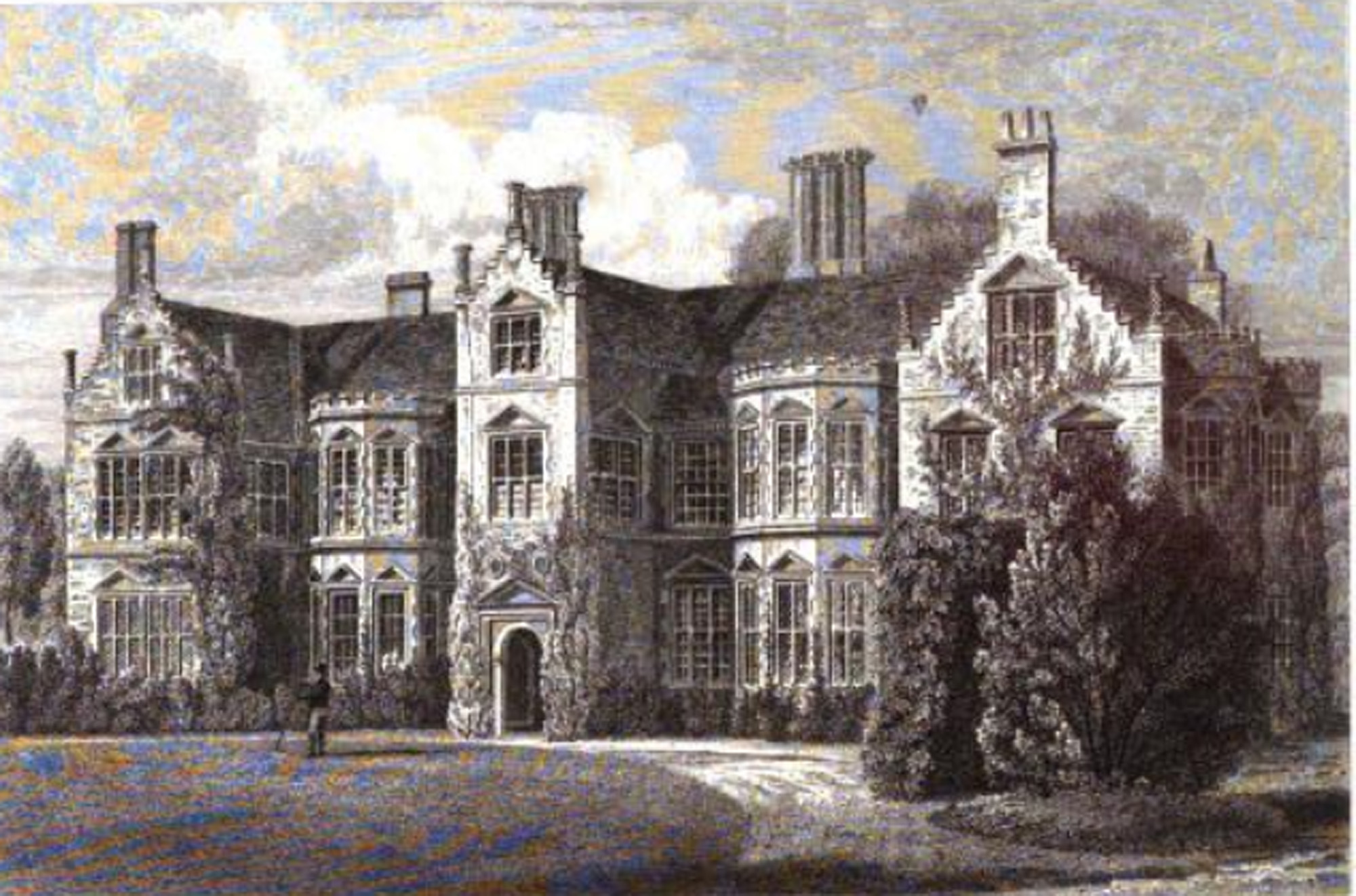
Engraving of Haughley Park in 1827

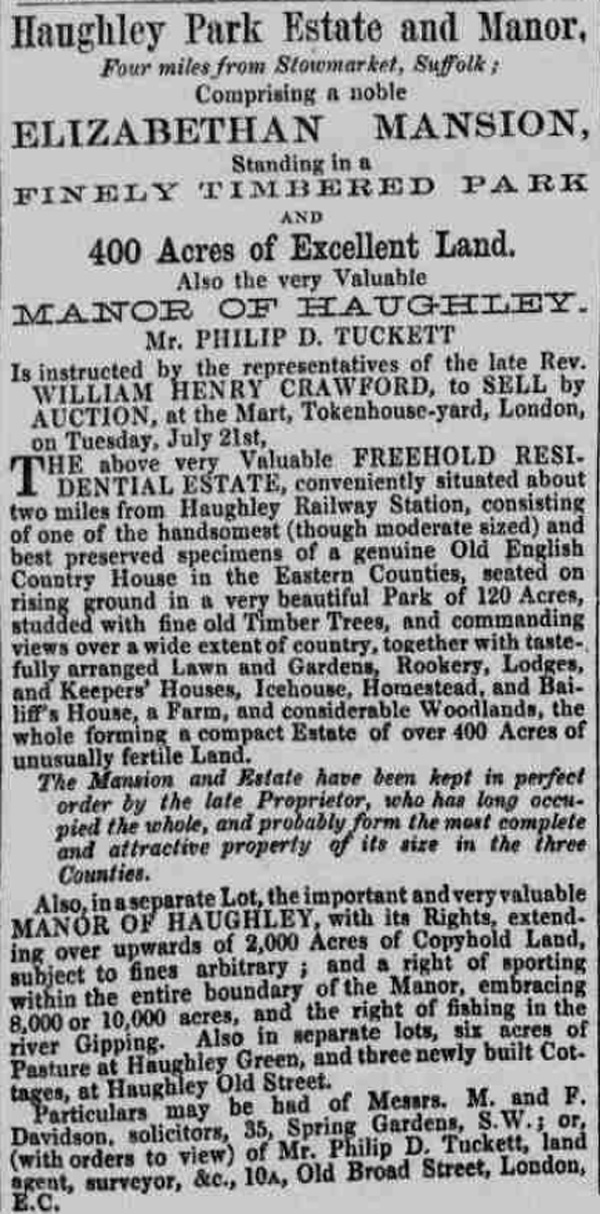
Sale notice of Haughley Park in 1868

William Crawford bought Haughley Hall in about 1816. He was born in 1756 and in 1780 he married Elizabeth Dorothea Cowley who was the daughter of Reverend Francis Lawrence Cowley. At the time of his marriage he lived at St James Westminster. The couple lived in London for many years and had five children – two boys and three girls. In 1792 Thomas inherited a very large fortune from Jane Calmel who was a spinster and owned a large amount of land in London.

Her brother Peter Calmel had died two years previously and named "William Crawford" and "Elizabeth Dorothea Crawford" in his will, leaving them annuities. When he bought Haughley Hall William Crawford was sixty and he came to the house accompanied by his wife and two unmarried daughters. He made some alterations to the building. An engraving of the Hall in 1827 is shown. His eldest son Thomas who was to be his heir died in 1830 so his younger son William Henry who had since become a clergyman inherited the estate in 1835 when he died.

The Reverend William Henry Crawford (1791-1868) lived at the hall with his two unmarried sisters for many years. Then in 1853 at the age of 62 he married Laura Taylor the daughter of a clergyman who was 35 years his junior. William died in 1868 and the Hall was placed on the market in the same year. The sale notice is shown.

== Pretyman family ==
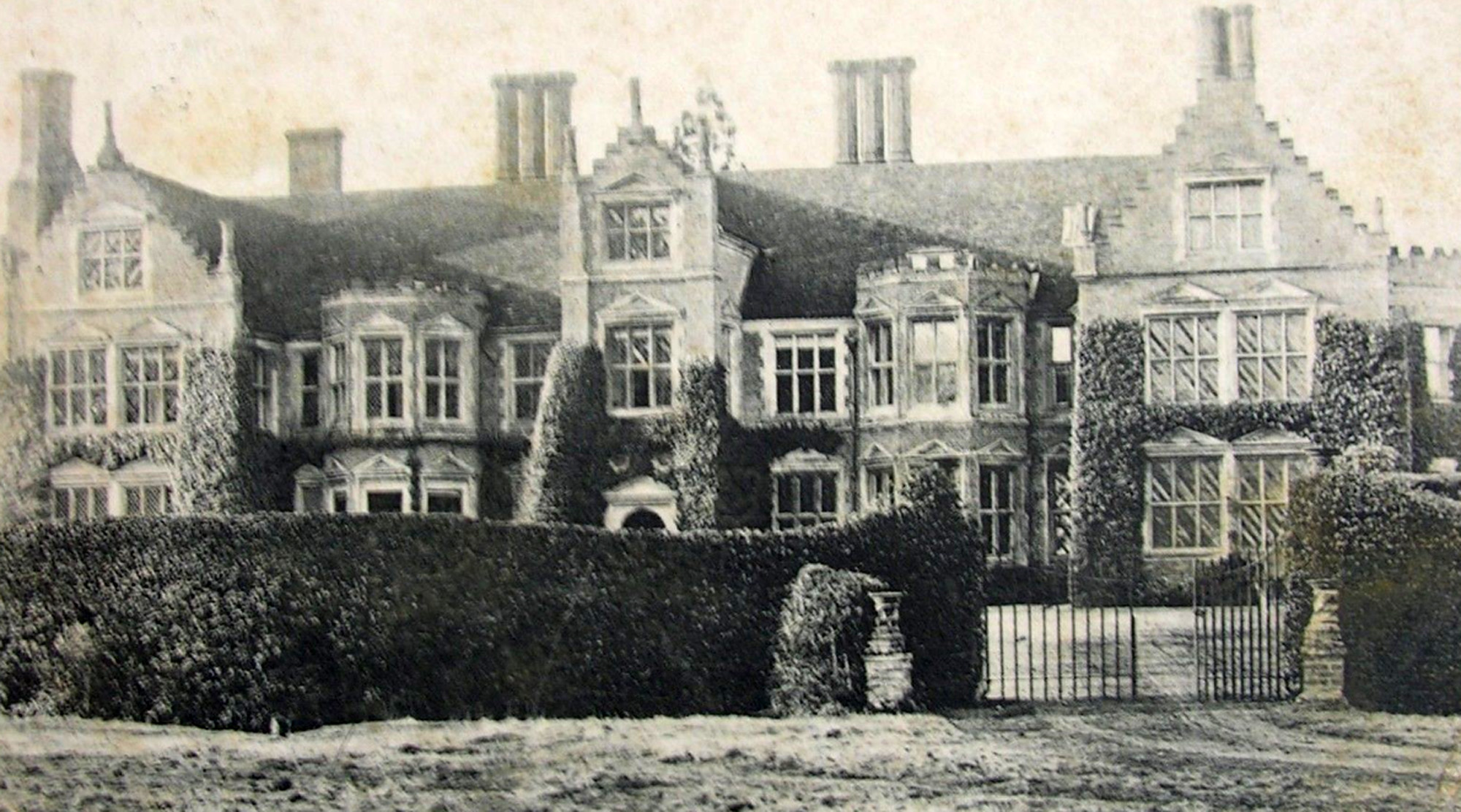
Haughley Park in 1905

Arthur Charles Pretyman bought Haughley in 1868 and lived there until his death thirty years later. Arthur was born in 1830 in Winchester. His father was Reverend George Thomas Pretyman who was the Chancellor of Lincoln. In 1858 he married Mary Baxter who was the heiress of Henry Baxter of Idvies, an estate in Scotland. Arthur was a military man and rose to the rank of captain in the 25th Regiment. He also did some service in India.

The couple had four children – one son and three daughters. His son Frederic Henry Pretyman (1875-1939) inherited the property when Arthur died in 1898. In 1917 he married Ethel Sparke, the daughter of Edward Bowyer Sparke who owned Gunthorpe Hall in Norfolk. Soon after this he put Haughley Park on the market.

== 20th Century ==
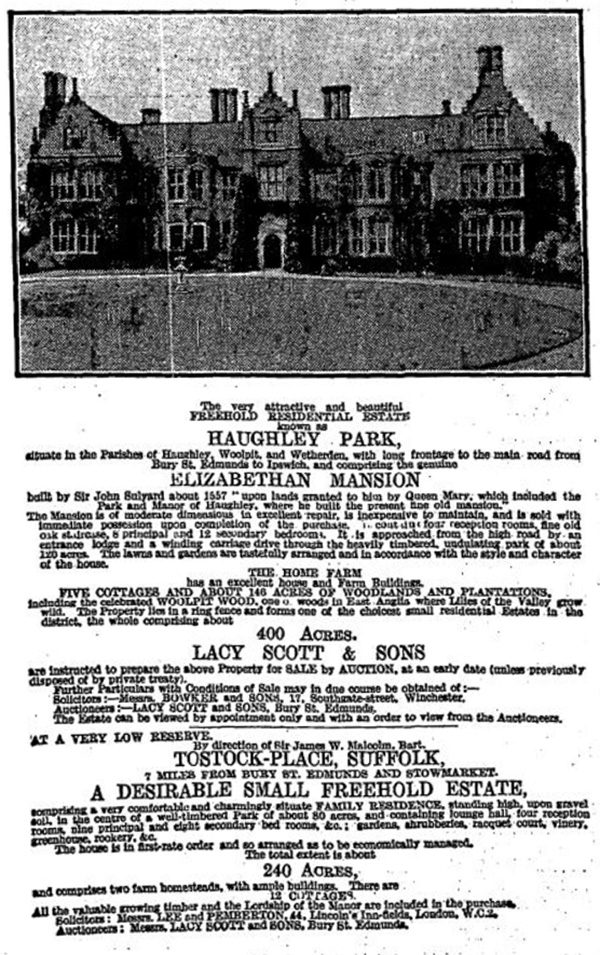
Sale notice for Haughley Park in 1920

The property was bought in 1924 by Turner Henderson, the second son of John Henderson who owned Studley Priory in Oxfordshire. Turner was born in 1876 and in 1914 he married Constance Pauncefort Duncombe.

In his obituary Turner is described as "a farmer, explorer and big game hunter. When he died in 1956 he left Haughley Park to the Zoological Society to be used as a zoological establishment, but they declined his offer.

Instead Alfred Williams bought the Park to be used as for his poultry processing business. A devastating fire in 1961 gutted some of the house. However it was fully restored by the family three years later. The poultry business was sold but the Williams family still retain ownership of the Park.

In 2019, plans to build new homes on the former poultry processing site were rejected by the local authority.
