= Earl of Mulgrave =

Earldom in the Peerage of the United Kingdom

The title Earl of Mulgrave has been created twice. The first time as a title in the Peerage of England and the second time as a Peerage of the United Kingdom.

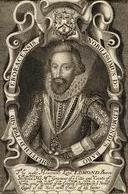
Edmund Sheffield, 1st Earl of Mulgrave (creation of 1626)

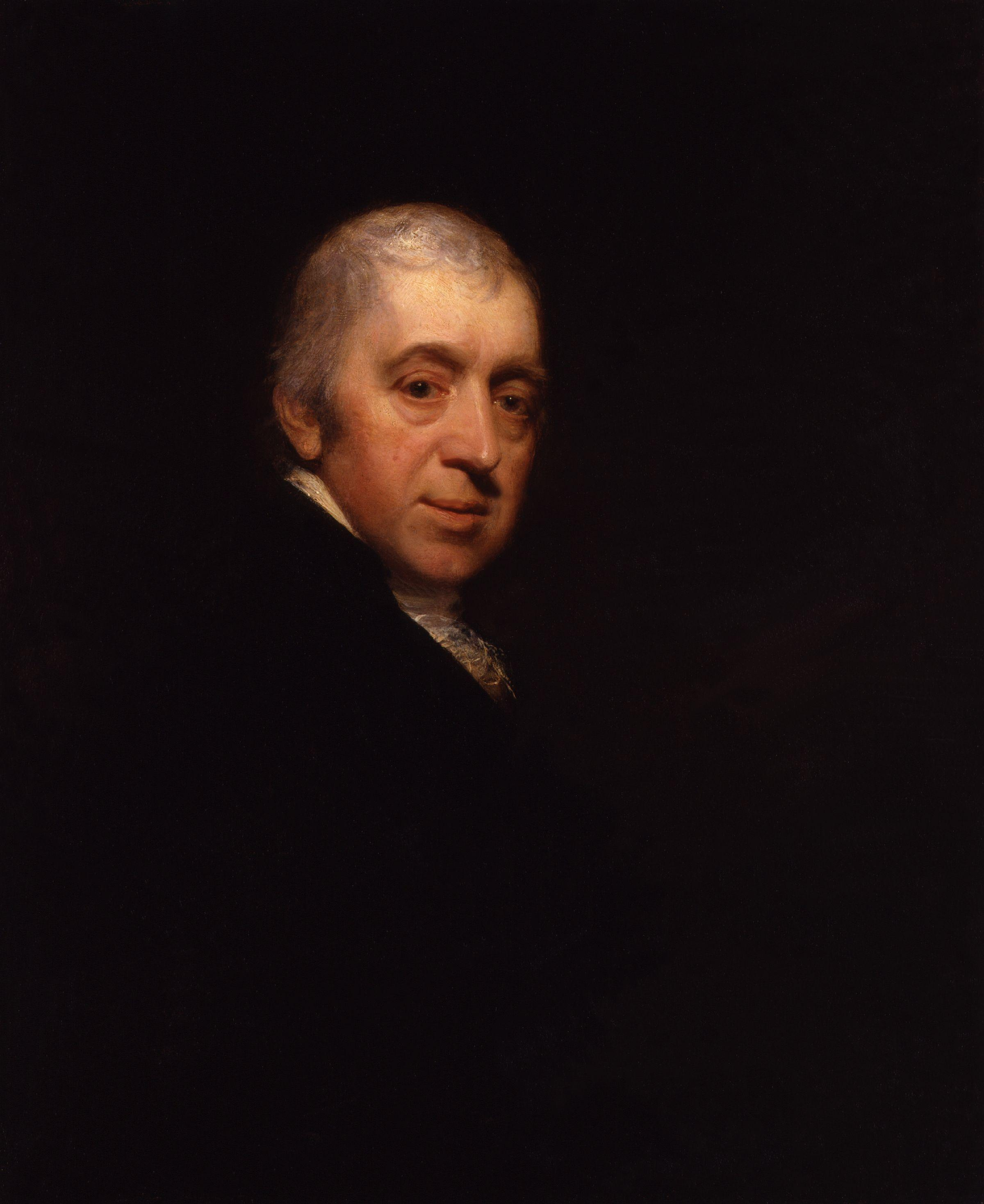
Henry Phipps, 1st Earl of Mulgrave (creation of 1812)

The first creation was in the Peerage of England in 1626 for Edmund Sheffield, 3rd Baron Sheffield KG, who served as Lord Lieutenant of Yorkshire from 1603 to 1619. The Sheffield family descended from Sir Edmund Sheffield, second cousin of Henry VIII, who in 1547 was raised to the Peerage of England as Baron Sheffield of Butterwick and in 1549 was murdered in the streets of Norwich during Kett's Rebellion. Upon the 1st Earl's death in 1646 he was succeeded by his grandson Edmund, who was in turn succeeded by his son John. This 3rd Earl of Mulgrave KG was a notable Tory politician of the late Stuart period, who served under Queen Anne as Lord Privy Seal and Lord President of the Council. He was created Marquess of Normanby in 1694 and Duke of Buckingham and Normanby in 1703. These titles became extinct on the death of his son, the 2nd Duke in 1735.

The second creation was in the Peerage of the United Kingdom in 1812 for Henry Phipps, 3rd Baron Mulgrave. He was a general in the Army as well as a prominent politician, and notably served as Foreign Secretary from 1805 to 1806 and as First Lord of the Admiralty from 1807 to 1810. His grandfather William Phipps had married Lady Catherine Annesley, who was the daughter and heiress of James Annesley, 3rd Earl of Anglesey and his wife Lady Catherine Darnley (an illegitimate daughter of King James II by his mistress Catherine Sedley, Countess of Dorchester). Lady Catherine Darnley had later married John Sheffield, 1st Duke of Buckingham and Normanby, and hence Henry Phipps, 3rd Baron Mulgrave was the step-great-grandson of the 1st Duke of Buckingham and Normanby. In 1812 this 3rd Baron Mulgrave was made Viscount Normanby, of Normanby in the County of York and Earl of Mulgrave, both titles in the Peerage of the United Kingdom. Upon his death in 1831, the 1st Earl of Mulgrave was succeeded by his eldest son Constantine. This 2nd Earl of Mulgrave was also a noted politician and served as Lord Lieutenant of Ireland and as Home Secretary. In 1838 he was created Marquess of Normanby in the Peerage of the United Kingdom. As of 2010, the titles are held by Constantine Phipps, 5th Marquess of Normanby.

Other members of the Phipps family have also gained distinction. The Hon. Sir Charles Phipps, second son of the 1st Earl, was a prominent court official. Sir Constantine Phipps, son of the Hon. Edmund Phipps, third son of the 1st Earl, was British Ambassador to Belgium from 1900 to 1906, while his son Sir Eric Phipps was British Ambassador to Germany between 1933 and 1937 and to France between 1937 and 1939. Also, Sir William Phipps (or Phips), Governor of Massachusetts, was a member of another branch of the family.

== Earls of Mulgrave, first creation (1626) ==
Other titles: Baron Sheffield (1547)

- Edmund Sheffield, 3rd Baron Sheffield (c. 1564–1646), created Earl of Mulgrave in 1626
- Edmund Sheffield, 2nd Earl of Mulgrave (1611–1658)
- John Sheffield, 3rd Earl of Mulgrave (1647–1721), created Marquess of Normanby in 1694

== Earls of Mulgrave, second creation (1812) ==
Other titles: Baron Mulgrave (1767), Baron Mulgrave (1794), Viscount Normanby (1812)

- Henry Phipps, 3rd Baron Mulgrave (1755–1831), created Earl of Mulgrave in 1812
- Constantine Phipps, 2nd Earl of Mulgrave (1797–1863), created Marquess of Normanby in 1838

== Family tree ==
Sheffield family tree: Barons Sheffield, Earls of Mulgrave and Dukes of Buckingham and Normanby

Baron Sheffield (1st creation, England), 1547
Edmund Sheffield; 1521–1549; 1st Baron Sheffield
John Sheffield c. 1538–1568; 2nd Baron Sheffield
Earl of Mulgrave (1st creation), 1626
Edmund Sheffield c. 1564–1646; 1st Earl of Mulgrave, 3rd Baron Sheffield
James II; 1633–1701; King of England and Scotland	Edmund Sheffield; 1611–1658; 2nd Earl of Mulgrave, 4th Baron Sheffield
Marquess of Normanby (1st creation), 1694; Duke of Buckingham and Normanby, 1703
Catherine Darnley; 1680–1743	John Sheffield; 1648–1721; 1st Duke of Buckingham and Normanby, etc., 3rd Earl of Mulgrave, 5th Baron Sheffield
William Phipps	Catherine Annesley d. 1743	John Sheffield; 1710 styled Marquess of Nomanby	Robert Sheffield; 1711–1714 styled Marquess of Nomanby	Edmund Sheffield; 1716–1735; 2nd Duke of Buckingham and Normanby, etc., 4th Earl of Mulgrave, 6th Baron Sheffield
Dukedom of Buckingham and Normanby, Marquess of Nomanby (1st creation), Earl of Mulgrave, and Baron Sheffield (1st creation) extinct, 1735
Baron Mulgrave (Ireland, 1st creation), 1767
Constantine Phipps c. 1722–1775; 1st Baron Mulgrave
Baron Mulgrave (Great Britain, 1st creation), 1790	Baron Mulgrave (Great Britain (2nd creation), recreated, 1794; Viscount Normanby; Earl of Mulgrave (2nd creation), 1812	Baron Sheffield of Dunnamore in the County of Meath, (2nd creation, Ireland), 1781; Baron Sheffield of Roscommon in the County of Roscommon, (3rd creation, Ireland), 1783; Baron Sheffield of Sheffield in the County of York, (4th creation, United Kingdom), 1802; Earl of Sheffield (Ireland) and Viscount Pevensey (Ireland), 1816
Constantine John Phipps; 1744–1792; 2nd Baron Mulgrave (Ireland); 1st Baron Mulgrave (Great Britain)	Henry Phipps; 1755–1831; 1st Earl of Mulgrave, etc., 3rd Baron Mulgrave (Ireland)	John Baker-Holroyd; 1735–1821; 1st Earl of Sheffield, etc.
Barony Mulgrave (Great Britain) extinct, 1792	Baron Stanley of Alderley, 1839
John Thomas Stanley; 1766–1850; 1st Baron Stanley	Maria Josepha Holroyd; 1771–1863
Marquess of Normanby (2nd creation), 1838	Baron Eddisbury, 1848
Constantine Henry Phipps; 1797–1863; 1st Marquess of Normanby, 2nd Earl of Mulgrave, etc., 4th Baron Mulgrave (Ireland)	Edward John Stanley; 1802–1869; 2nd Baron Stanley, 1st Baron Eddisbury	George Augustus Frederick Charles Holroyd; 1802–1876; 2nd Earl of Sheffield, etc.
George Augustus Constantine Phipps; 1819–1890; 2nd Marquess of Normanby, 3rd Earl of Mulgrave, etc., 5th Baron Mulgrave (Ireland)	Henry Edward John Stanley; 1827–1903; 3rd Baron Stanley, 2nd Baron Eddisbury	Fredrick Henry Stuart Holroyd; 1827–1829 styled Viscount Pevensey	Henry North Holroyd; 1832–1909; 3rd Earl of Sheffield, etc.
Earldom of Sheffield, Viscount Pevensey, and Baron Sheffield (2nd and 4th creations), extinct 1909
Constantine Charles Henry Phipps; 1846–1932; 3rd Marquess of Normanby, 4th Earl of Mulgrave, etc., 6th Baron Mulgrave (Ireland)	Edward Lyulph Stanley; 1839–1925; 4th Baron Sheffield (3rd creation, Ireland); 4th Baron Stanley, 3rd Baron Eddisbury
Arthur Lyulph Stanley; 1875–1931; 5th Baron Sheffield, 5th Baron Stanley, 4th Baron Eddisbury	Oliver Hugh Stanley; 1879–1952
Oswald Constantine John Phipps; 1912–1994; 4th Marquess of Normanby, 5th Earl of Mulgrave, etc., 7th Baron Mulgrave (Ireland)	Edward John Stanley; 1907–1971; 6th Baron Sheffield, 6th Baron Stanley, 5th Baron Eddisbury	Lyulph Henry Victor Owen Stanley; 1915–1971; 7th Baron Sheffield, 7th Baron Stanley, 6th Baron Eddisbury	Thomas Henry Oliver Stanley; 1927–2013; 8th Baron Sheffield, 8th Baron Stanley, 7th Baron Eddisbury
Constantine Edmund Walter Phipps b. 1954; 5th Marquess of Normanby, 6th Earl of Mulgrave, etc., 8th Baron Mulgrave (Ireland)	Richard Oliver Stanley b. 1956; 9th Baron Sheffield, 9th Baron Stanley, 8th Baron Eddisbury	Charles Ernest Stanley b. 1960
Heir presumptive to the Baronies Sheffield, Stanley, and Eddisbury
John Samuel Constantine Phipps b. 1994 styled Earl of Mulgrave	Thomas Henry Winston Phipps b. 1997	Oliver Richard Hugh Stanley; 1986–1989
Heir apparent to the Marquessate of Normanby

== See also ==
- Baron Sheffield
- Baron Mulgrave
- Marquess of Normanby
- Duke of Buckingham and Normanby
