= Marquess of Normanby =

Title in England

Marquessate of Normanby
- Quarterly: 1st & 4th, Sable, a Trefoil slipped between eight Mullets Argent (Phipps); 2nd, Paly of six Argent and Azure, a Bend Gules (Annesley); 3rd, The Royal Arms of King James II within a Bordure compony Argent and Azure (by grant from King James II to his natural daughter, Lady Catherine Darnley)
- Creation date: 25 June 1838
- Creation: Second
- Created by: Queen Victoria
- First holder: Constantine Phipps, 2nd Earl of Mulgrave
- Present holder: Constantine Phipps, 5th Marquess of Normanby
- Heir apparent: John Phipps, Earl of Mulgrave
- Subsidiary titles: Earl of Mulgrave; Viscount Normanby; Baron Mulgrave (GB, 1794); Baron Mulgrave (I, 1767)
- Status: Extant
- Seat: Mulgrave Castle
- Motto: Virtute quies ("Rest in virtue")
- For the 1st creation of the Marquess of Normanby see Duke of Buckingham and Normanby

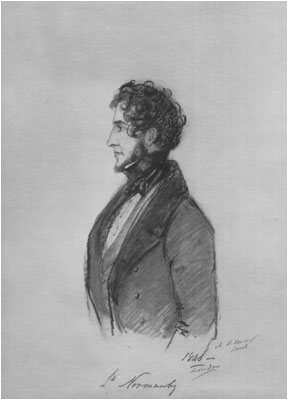
Constantine Phipps, 1st Marquess of Normanby (creation of 1838)

Marquess of Normanby is a title that has been created twice, once in the Peerage of England and once in the Peerage of the United Kingdom. The first creation came in 1694 in the Peerage of England in favour of John Sheffield, 3rd Earl of Mulgrave. He was a notable Tory politician of the late Stuart period, who served under Queen Anne as Lord Privy Seal and Lord President of the Council. In 1703 this first Marquess of Normanby was further honoured when he was made Duke of Buckingham and Normanby. These titles became extinct on the death of the 2nd Duke in 1735.

The second creation came in the Peerage of the United Kingdom on 25 June 1838, in favour of Constantine Phipps, 2nd Earl of Mulgrave. He was a noted politician and served as Lord Lieutenant of Ireland and as Home Secretary. His great-grandfather William Phipps had married Lady Catherine Annesley, who was the daughter and heiress of James Annesley, 3rd Earl of Anglesey and his wife Lady Catherine Darnley (an illegitimate daughter of King James II by his mistress Catherine Sedley, Countess of Dorchester). Lady Catherine Darnley had later married John Sheffield, 1st Duke of Buckingham and Normanby, and hence Constantine Phipps, 2nd Earl of Mulgrave was the step-great-great-grandson of the 1st Duke of Buckingham and Normanby. Upon his death, Constantine Phipps, 1st Marquess of Normanby was succeeded by his son, the 2nd Marquess. He was a Liberal politician and also served as Governor of New Zealand. His grandson, the fourth Marquess, served briefly as a Labour Lord-in-waiting (government whip in the House of Lords) in 1945 and was also Lord Lieutenant of the North Riding of Yorkshire and of North Yorkshire. As of 2013 the titles are held by the latter's eldest son, the fifth Marquess, who succeeded in 1994. The fifth Marquess also served in the House of Lords until he lost his seat in the House of Lords Act 1999.

The family seat is Mulgrave Castle near Whitby, North Yorkshire.

== Marquess of Normanby, First creation (1694) ==
- see the Duke of Buckingham and Normanby

== Barons Mulgrave, First Creation (1767) ==
- Constantine Phipps, 1st Baron Mulgrave (1722–1775)
- Constantine John Phipps, 2nd Baron Mulgrave, 1st Baron Mulgrave (1744–1792) (created Baron Mulgrave in 1790; title extinct on his death)
- Henry Phipps, 3rd Baron Mulgrave, 1st Baron Mulgrave (1755–1831) (created Baron Mulgrave in 1794 and Viscount Normanby and Earl of Mulgrave in 1812)

== Earls of Mulgrave, Second Creation (1812) ==
- Henry Phipps, 1st Earl of Mulgrave, 1st Viscount Normanby, 3rd Baron Mulgrave, 1st Baron Mulgrave (1755–1831)
- Constantine Henry Phipps, 2nd Earl of Mulgrave, 2nd Viscount Normanby, 4th Baron Mulgrave, 2nd Baron Mulgrave (1797–1863) (created Marquess of Normanby in 1838)

== Marquesses of Normanby, Second Creation (1838) ==
- Constantine Henry Phipps, 1st Marquess of Normanby, 2nd Earl of Mulgrave, 2nd Viscount Normanby, 4th Baron Mulgrave, 2nd Baron Mulgrave (1797–1863)
- George Augustus Constantine Phipps, 2nd Marquess of Normanby, 3rd Earl of Mulgrave, 3rd Viscount Normanby, 5th Baron Mulgrave, 3rd Baron Mulgrave (1819–1890)
- Constantine Charles Henry Phipps, 3rd Marquess of Normanby, 4th Earl of Mulgrave, 4th Viscount Normanby, 6th Baron Mulgrave, 4th Baron Mulgrave (1846–1932)
- Oswald Constantine John Phipps, 4th Marquess of Normanby, 5th Earl of Mulgrave, 5th Viscount Normanby, 7th Baron Mulgrave, 5th Baron Mulgrave (1912–1994)
- Constantine Edmund Walter Phipps, 5th Marquess of Normanby, 6th Earl of Mulgrave, 6th Viscount Normanby, 8th Baron Mulgrave, 6th Baron Mulgrave (b. 1954)

The heir apparent is the present holder's son John Samuel Constantine Phipps, Earl of Mulgrave (b. 1994).

== Family tree ==
Sheffield family tree: Barons Sheffield, Earls of Mulgrave and Dukes of Buckingham and Normanby

Baron Sheffield (1st creation, England), 1547
Edmund Sheffield; 1521–1549; 1st Baron Sheffield
John Sheffield c. 1538–1568; 2nd Baron Sheffield
Earl of Mulgrave (1st creation), 1626
Edmund Sheffield c. 1564–1646; 1st Earl of Mulgrave, 3rd Baron Sheffield
James II; 1633–1701; King of England and Scotland	Edmund Sheffield; 1611–1658; 2nd Earl of Mulgrave, 4th Baron Sheffield
Marquess of Normanby (1st creation), 1694; Duke of Buckingham and Normanby, 1703
Catherine Darnley; 1680–1743	John Sheffield; 1648–1721; 1st Duke of Buckingham and Normanby, etc., 3rd Earl of Mulgrave, 5th Baron Sheffield
William Phipps	Catherine Annesley d. 1743	John Sheffield; 1710 styled Marquess of Nomanby	Robert Sheffield; 1711–1714 styled Marquess of Nomanby	Edmund Sheffield; 1716–1735; 2nd Duke of Buckingham and Normanby, etc., 4th Earl of Mulgrave, 6th Baron Sheffield
Dukedom of Buckingham and Normanby, Marquess of Nomanby (1st creation), Earl of Mulgrave, and Baron Sheffield (1st creation) extinct, 1735
Baron Mulgrave (Ireland, 1st creation), 1767
Constantine Phipps c. 1722–1775; 1st Baron Mulgrave
Baron Sheffield of Dunnamore in the County of Meath, (2nd creation, Ireland), 1781; Baron Sheffield of Roscommon in the County of Roscommon, (3rd creation, Ireland), 1783
Baron Mulgrave (Great Britain, 1st creation), 1790	Baron Mulgrave (Great Britain (2nd creation), recreated, 1794; Viscount Normanby; Earl of Mulgrave (2nd creation), 1812	Baron Sheffield of Sheffield in the County of York, (4th creation, United Kingdom), 1802; Earl of Sheffield (Ireland) and Viscount Pevensey (Ireland), 1816
Constantine John Phipps; 1744–1792; 2nd Baron Mulgrave (Ireland); 1st Baron Mulgrave (Great Britain)	Henry Phipps; 1755–1831; 1st Earl of Mulgrave, etc., 3rd Baron Mulgrave (Ireland)	John Baker-Holroyd; 1735–1821; 1st Earl of Sheffield, etc.
Barony Mulgrave (Great Britain) extinct, 1792	Baron Stanley of Alderley, 1839
John Thomas Stanley; 1766–1850; 1st Baron Stanley	Maria Josepha Holroyd; 1771–1863
Marquess of Normanby (2nd creation), 1838	Baron Eddisbury, 1848
Constantine Henry Phipps; 1797–1863; 1st Marquess of Normanby, 2nd Earl of Mulgrave, etc., 4th Baron Mulgrave (Ireland)	Edward John Stanley; 1802–1869; 2nd Baron Stanley, 1st Baron Eddisbury	George Augustus Frederick Charles Holroyd; 1802–1876; 2nd Earl of Sheffield, etc.
George Augustus Constantine Phipps; 1819–1890; 2nd Marquess of Normanby, 3rd Earl of Mulgrave, etc., 5th Baron Mulgrave (Ireland)	Henry Edward John Stanley; 1827–1903; 3rd Baron Stanley, 2nd Baron Eddisbury	Fredrick Henry Stuart Holroyd; 1827–1829 styled Viscount Pevensey	Henry North Holroyd; 1832–1909; 3rd Earl of Sheffield, etc.
Earldom of Sheffield, Viscount Pevensey, and Baron Sheffield (2nd and 4th creations), extinct 1909
Constantine Charles Henry Phipps; 1846–1932; 3rd Marquess of Normanby, 4th Earl of Mulgrave, etc., 6th Baron Mulgrave (Ireland)	Edward Lyulph Stanley; 1839–1925; 4th Baron Sheffield (3rd creation, Ireland); 4th Baron Stanley, 3rd Baron Eddisbury
Arthur Lyulph Stanley; 1875–1931; 5th Baron Sheffield, 5th Baron Stanley, 4th Baron Eddisbury	Oliver Hugh Stanley; 1879–1952
Oswald Constantine John Phipps; 1912–1994; 4th Marquess of Normanby, 5th Earl of Mulgrave, etc., 7th Baron Mulgrave (Ireland)	Edward John Stanley; 1907–1971; 6th Baron Sheffield, 6th Baron Stanley, 5th Baron Eddisbury	Lyulph Henry Victor Owen Stanley; 1915–1971; 7th Baron Sheffield, 7th Baron Stanley, 6th Baron Eddisbury	Thomas Henry Oliver Stanley; 1927–2013; 8th Baron Sheffield, 8th Baron Stanley, 7th Baron Eddisbury
Constantine Edmund Walter Phipps b. 1954; 5th Marquess of Normanby, 6th Earl of Mulgrave, etc., 8th Baron Mulgrave (Ireland)	Richard Oliver Stanley b. 1956; 9th Baron Sheffield, 9th Baron Stanley, 8th Baron Eddisbury	Charles Ernest Stanley b. 1960
Heir presumptive to the Baronies Sheffield, Stanley, and Eddisbury
John Samuel Constantine Phipps b. 1994 styled Earl of Mulgrave	Thomas Henry Winston Phipps b. 1997	Oliver Richard Hugh Stanley; 1986–1989
Heir apparent to the Marquessate of Normanby

== Line of succession ==
Line of succession (simplified)
- George Phipps, 2nd Marquess of Normanby (1819–1890)
  - Constantine Phipps, 3rd Marquess of Normanby (1846-1932)
    - Oswald Phipps, 4th Marquess of Normanby (1912–1994)
      - Constantine Phipps, 5th Marquess of Normanby (born 1954)
        - (1). John Samuel Constantine Phipps, Earl of Mulgrave (b. 1994)
        - (2). Lord Thomas Henry Winston Phipps (b. 1997)
      - (3). Lord Justin Charles Phipps (b. 1958)
        - (4). William David Phipps (b. 1990)
  - Lord Henry George Russell Phipps (1851-1905)
    - Vivian Louis Augustus Phipps (1884-1971)
      - Vivian Henry Blakeney Phipps (1923-1991)
        - male issue and descendants in remainder
      - Hervey Owen Phipps (1925-1982)
        - male issue and descendants in remainder

There are other heirs in remainder to the earldom of Mulgrave descended from the younger sons of the first earl.

== See also ==
- Baron Sheffield
- Earl of Mulgrave
- Duke of Buckingham and Normanby
