= Baron Eddisbury =

Title in the Peerage of the United Kingdom

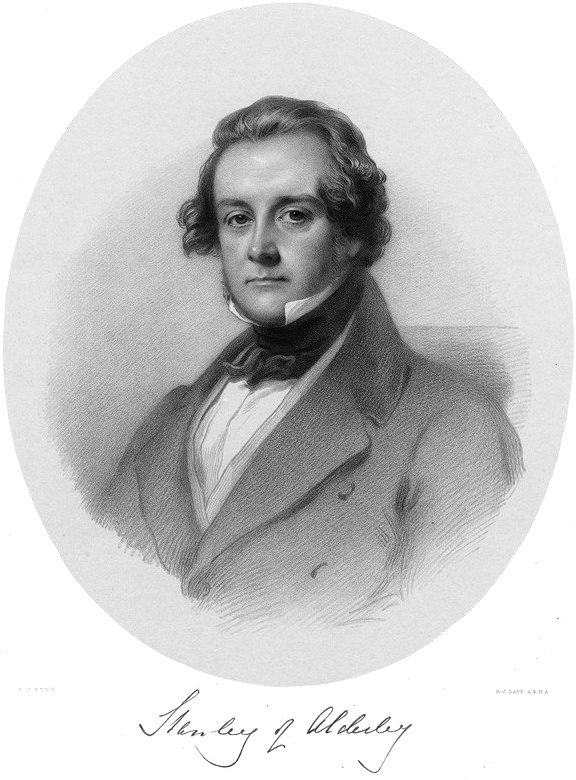
Edward Stanley (1802–1869), 1st Baron Eddisbury from 1848 and 2nd Baron Stanley of Alderley from 1850

Baron Eddisbury, of Winnington in the County Palatine of Chester, is a title in the Peerage of the United Kingdom. It was created on 12 May 1848 for the Whig politician and diplomat Edward Stanley (1802–1869), son of the politician Sir John Stanley, 7th Baronet.

Edward Stanley started his career in 1831 as Whig member of the House of Commons before holding various cabinet posts under Prime Ministers Lord Melbourne, Lord Russell and Lord Palmerston. He became a member of the Privy Council in 1841, was created Baron Eddisbury in 1848 and served as Postmaster-General from 1860 to 1866.

In 1839, Lord Eddisbury's father Sir John Stanley, 7th Baronet, had been raised to the peerage as Baron Stanley of Alderley. Upon his death in 1850, his barony and the Stanley Baronetcy passed to Lord Eddisbury, who thereby became 2nd Baron Stanley of Alderley and 8th Baronet of Alderley Hall. These titles have remained united since; most holders have chosen to be known as Lord Stanley of Alderley. In 1909, Edward Stanley, the 4th Baron Stanley of Alderley and 3rd Baron Eddisbury, acquired a further title for the Stanley family when he succeeded his first cousin once removed, the 3rd Earl of Sheffield, according to a special remainder and thus inherited the title of 4th Baron Sheffield.

== Barons Eddisbury (1848) ==
- Edward John Stanley, 1st Baron Eddisbury, 2nd Baron Stanley of Alderley (1802–1869)
- Henry Edward John Stanley, 2nd Baron Eddisbury, 3rd Baron Stanley of Alderley (1827–1903)
- Edward Lyulph Stanley, 3rd Baron Eddisbury, 4th Baron Stanley of Alderley, 4th Baron Sheffield (1839–1925) (known as Lord Stanley of Alderley)
- Arthur Lyulph Stanley, 4th Baron Eddisbury, 5th Baron Stanley of Alderley, 5th Baron Sheffield (1875–1931) (known as Lord Sheffield)
- Edward John Stanley, 5th Baron Eddisbury, 6th Baron Stanley of Alderley, 6th Baron Sheffield (1907–1971) (known as Lord Stanley of Alderley)
- Lyulph Henry Victor Owen Stanley, 6th Baron Eddisbury, 7th Baron Stanley of Alderley, 7th Baron Sheffield (1915–1971) (known as Lord Sheffield)
- Thomas Henry Oliver Stanley, 7th Baron Eddisbury, 8th Baron Stanley of Alderley, 8th Baron Sheffield (1927–2013) (known as Lord Stanley of Alderley)
- Richard Oliver Stanley, 8th Baron Eddisbury, 9th Baron Stanley of Alderley, 9th Baron Sheffield (b. 1956)

The heir presumptive is the present holder's brother Hon. Charles Ernest Stanley (b. 1960).

== Arms ==
Coat of arms of Baron Eddisbury
Crest On a chapeau gules, turned up ermine, an eagle with wings expanded or preying upon an infant proper, swaddled gules, handed argent. Escutcheon Argent, on a bend azure, three bucks' heads cabossed or, a crescent for difference. Supporters Dexter, a stag or, gorged with a ducal crown, line reflexed over the back, and charged on the shoulder with a mullet azure; sinister, a lion reguardant proper, gorged with a plain collar argent charged with three escallops gules. Motto Sans Changer "Without Changing"

== Family tree ==
Sheffield family tree: Barons Sheffield, Earls of Mulgrave and Dukes of Buckingham and Normanby

Baron Sheffield (1st creation, England), 1547
Edmund Sheffield; 1521–1549; 1st Baron Sheffield
John Sheffield (c. 1538–1568); 2nd Baron Sheffield
Earl of Mulgrave (1st creation), 1626
Edmund Sheffield (c. 1564–1646); 1st Earl of Mulgrave; 3rd Baron Sheffield
James II; 1633–1701; King of England and Scotland	Edmund Sheffield; 1611–1658; 2nd Earl of Mulgrave; 4th Baron Sheffield
Marquess of Normanby (1st creation), 1694; Duke of Buckingham and Normanby, 1703
Catherine Darnley; 1680–1743	John Sheffield; 1648–1721; 1st Duke of Buckingham and Normanby and Marquess of Normanby; 3rd Earl of Mulgrave; 5th Baron Sheffield
William Phipps	Catherine Annesley (d. 1743)	John Sheffield; 1710 styled Marquess of Nomanby	Robert Sheffield; 1711–1714 styled Marquess of Nomanby	Edmund Sheffield; 1716–1735; 2nd Duke of Buckingham and Normanby and Marquess of Normanby; 4th Earl of Mulgrave; 6th Baron Sheffield
Dukedom of Buckingham and Normanby, Marquess of Nomanby (1st creation), Earl of Mulgrave, and Baron Sheffield (1st creation) extinct, 1735
Baron Mulgrave (Ireland, 1st creation), 1767
Constantine Phipps (c. 1722–1775); 1st Baron Mulgrave
Baron Mulgrave (Great Britain, 1st creation), 1790	Baron Mulgrave (Great Britain (2nd creation), recreated, 1794; Viscount Normanby; Earl of Mulgrave (2nd creation), 1812	Baron Sheffield of Dunnamore in the County of Meath, (2nd creation, Ireland), 1781; Baron Sheffield of Roscommon in the County of Roscommon, (3rd creation, Ireland), 1783; Baron Sheffield of Sheffield in the County of York, (4th creation, United Kingdom), 1802; Earl of Sheffield (Ireland) and Viscount Pevensey (Ireland), 1816
Constantine John Phipps; 1744–1792; 2nd Baron Mulgrave (Ireland); 1st Baron Mulgrave (Great Britain)	Henry Phipps; 1755–1831; 1st Earl of Mulgrave, Viscount Normanby, and Baron Mulgrave (Great Britain), 3rd Baron Mulgrave (Ireland)	John Baker-Holroyd; 1735–1821; 1st Earl of Sheffield, Viscount Pevensey, and Baron Sheffield
Barony Mulgrave (Great Britain) extinct, 1792	Baron Stanley of Alderley, 1839
John Thomas Stanley; 1766–1850; 1st Baron Stanley	Maria Josepha Holroyd; 1771–1863
Marquess of Normanby (2nd creation), 1838	Baron Eddisbury, 1848
Constantine Henry Phipps; 1797–1863; 1st Marquess of Normanby; 2nd Earl of Mulgrave, Viscount Normanby, and Baron Mulgrave (Great Britain), 4th Baron Mulgrave (Ireland)	Edward John Stanley; 1802–1869; 2nd Baron Stanley; 1st Baron Eddisbury	George Augustus Frederick Charles Holroyd; 1802–1876; 2nd Earl of Sheffield, Viscount Pevensey, and Baron Sheffield
George Augustus Constantine Phipps; 1819–1890; 2nd Marquess of Normanby; 3rd Earl of Mulgrave, Viscount Normanby, and Baron Mulgrave (Great Britain), 5th Baron Mulgrave (Ireland)	Henry Edward John Stanley; 1827–1903; 3rd Baron Stanley; 2nd Baron Eddisbury	Fredrick Henry Stuart Holroyd; 1827–1829 styled Viscount Pevensey	Henry North Holroyd; 1832–1909; 3rd Earl of Sheffield, Viscount Pevensey, and Baron Sheffield
Earldom of Sheffield, Viscount Pevensey, and Baron Sheffield (2nd and 4th creations), extinct 1909
Constantine Charles Henry Phipps; 1846–1932; 3rd Marquess of Normanby; 4th Earl of Mulgrave, Viscount Normanby, and Baron Mulgrave (Great Britain), 6th Baron Mulgrave (Ireland)	Edward Lyulph Stanley; 1839–1925; 4th Baron Sheffield (3rd creation, Ireland); 4th Baron Stanley; 3rd Baron Eddisbury
Arthur Lyulph Stanley; 1875–1931; 5th Baron Sheffield; 5th Baron Stanley; 4th Baron Eddisbury	Oliver Hugh Stanley; 1879–1952
Oswald Constantine John Phipps; 1912–1994; 4th Marquess of Normanby; 5th Earl of Mulgrave, Viscount Normanby, and Baron Mulgrave (Great Britain), 7th Baron Mulgrave (Ireland)	Edward John Stanley; 1907–1971; 6th Baron Sheffield; 6th Baron Stanley; 5th Baron Eddisbury	Lyulph Henry Victor Owen Stanley; 1915–1971; 7th Baron Sheffield; 7th Baron Stanley; 6th Baron Eddisbury	Thomas Henry Oliver Stanley; 1927–2013; 8th Baron Sheffield; 8th Baron Stanley; 7th Baron Eddisbury
Constantine Edmund Walter Phipps (b. 1954); 5th Marquess of Normanby; 6th Earl of Mulgrave, Viscount Normanby, and Baron Mulgrave (Great Britain), 8th Baron Mulgrave (Ireland)	Richard Oliver Stanley (b. 1956); 9th Baron Sheffield; 9th Baron Stanley; 8th Baron Eddisbury	Charles Ernest Stanley (b. 1960)
Heir presumptive to the Baronies Sheffield, Stanley, and Eddisbury
John Samuel Constantine Phipps (b. 1994) styled Earl of Mulgrave	Thomas Henry Winston Phipps (b. 1997)	Oliver Richard Hugh Stanley; 1986–1989
Heir apparent to the Marquessate of Normanby

== See also ==
- Baron Stanley of Alderley
- Baron Sheffield
- Stanley Baronets
