= Baron Sheffield =

Extinct barony in the Peerage of England

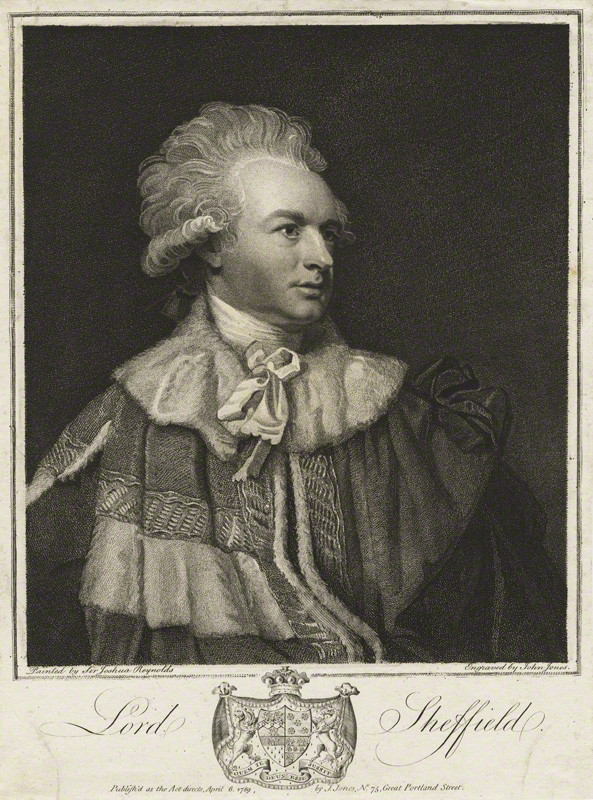
John Baker-Holroyd (1735–1821), who became 1st Baron Sheffield (1781), 1st Baron Sheffield (1783), 1st Baron Sheffield (1802), 1st Viscount Pevensey (1816) and 1st Earl of Sheffield (1816).

Baron Sheffield is a title that has been created four times: once in the Peerage of England, twice in the Peerage of Ireland, and once in the Peerage of the United Kingdom.

The first creation, as Baron Sheffield of Butterwick, was in the Peerage of England in 1547 for Edmund Sheffield (1521–1549), second cousin of Henry VIII, who was murdered in Norwich during Kett's Rebellion. His grandson, the 3rd Baron Sheffield, was created Earl of Mulgrave in 1626, and the 3rd Earl of Mulgrave was finally advanced to the dukedom of Buckingham and Normanby. In 1735, at the death of the 2nd Duke of Buckingham and Normanby, however, all of the titles became extinct since no heirs to them remained.

The next three creations were all in favour of one person, John Baker-Holroyd (1735–1821). In 1781, on the second creation of the title, he was made Baron Sheffield, of Dunnamore in the County of Meath in the Peerage of Ireland. This peerage was created with normal remainder to the heirs male of his body. Two years later, in 1783, John Baker-Holroyd obtained the third creation of the title when he was made Baron Sheffield, of Roscommon in the County of Roscommon, also in the Peerage of Ireland, with remainder, failing heirs male of his body, to the heirs male of his daughters from his first marriage. On the fourth creation of a Sheffield barony in 1802, John Baker-Holroyd was created Baron Sheffield, of Sheffield in the County of York, in the Peerage of the United Kingdom. In 1816 the same John Baker-Holroyd was further made Earl of Sheffield and Viscount Pevensey in the Peerage of Ireland. The latter titles were all created with remainder to the heirs male of his body. He was succeeded by his son from his second marriage.

On the death in 1909 of the 3rd Earl of Sheffield, his earldom, the Pevensey viscountcy and the Sheffield baronies of 1781 and 1802 became extinct. However, he was succeeded in the Sheffield barony of 1783 according to special remainder by Edward Stanley, 4th Baron Stanley of Alderley, who was also 3rd Baron Eddisbury and now became 4th Baron Sheffield as well. The 4th Baron Sheffield was the grandson of Lady Maria Josepha Holroyd, daughter of the 1st Earl of Sheffield. These titles remain extant and united, see Baron Stanley of Alderley for further succession.

== Barons Sheffield, First creation (1547) ==
- Edmund Sheffield, 1st Baron Sheffield (1521–1549)
- John Sheffield, 2nd Baron Sheffield (c. 1538–1568)
- Edmund Sheffield, 3rd Baron Sheffield (c. 1564–1646), created Earl of Mulgrave in 1626

== Barons Sheffield, Second and fourth creations (1781; 1802), Earls of Sheffield (1816) ==
- John Baker-Holroyd, 1st Earl of Sheffield, 1st Baron Sheffield (1735–1821)
- George Augustus Frederick Charles Holroyd, 2nd Earl of Sheffield, 2nd Baron Sheffield (1802–1876)
  - Fredrick Henry Stuart Holroyd, Viscount Pevensey (1827–1829)
- Henry North Holroyd, 3rd Earl of Sheffield, 3rd Baron Sheffield (1832–1909)

== Barons Sheffield, Third creation (1783) ==
- John Baker-Holroyd, 1st Earl of Sheffield, 1st Baron Sheffield (1735–1821)
- George Augustus Frederick Charles Holroyd, 2nd Earl of Sheffield, 2nd Baron Sheffield (1802–1876)
- Henry North Holroyd, 3rd Earl of Sheffield, 3rd Baron Sheffield (1832–1909)
- Edward Lyulph Stanley, 4th Baron Stanley of Alderley, 3rd Baron Eddisbury, 4th Baron Sheffield (1839–1925) (known as Lord Sheffield )
- Arthur Lyulph Stanley, 5th Baron Stanley of Alderley, 4th Baron Eddisbury, 5th Baron Sheffield (1875–1931) (known as Lord Stanley)
- Edward John Stanley, 6th Baron Stanley of Alderley, 5th Baron Eddisbury, 6th Baron Sheffield (1907–1971) (known as Lord Stanley)
- Lyulph Henry Victor Owen Stanley, 7th Baron Stanley of Alderley, 6th Baron Eddisbury, 7th Baron Sheffield (1915–1971) (known as Lord Sheffield)
- Thomas Henry Oliver Stanley, 8th Baron Stanley of Alderley, 7th Baron Eddisbury, 8th Baron Sheffield (1927–2013) (known as Lord Stanley)
- Richard Oliver Stanley 9th Baron Stanley of Alderley, 8th Baron Eddisbury and 9th Baron Sheffield (born 1956)

The heir presumptive is the present holder's brother Hon. Charles Ernest Stanley (born 1960), who has three daughters. The next in line to the peerages is his brother Hon. Harry John Stanley (born 1963), whose heir is his only son Bertram Thomas Zulfikar Stanley (born 2007).

=== Arms ===
Coat of arms of Baron Sheffield
Crest On a chapeau gules, turned up ermine, an eagle with wings expanded or preying upon an infant proper, swaddled gules, handed argent. Escutcheon Argent, on a bend azure, three bucks' heads cabossed or, a crescent for difference. Supporters Dexter, a stag or, gorged with a ducal crown, line reflexed over the back, and charged on the shoulder with a mullet azure; sinister, a lion reguardant proper, gorged with a plain collar argent charged with three escallops gules. Motto Sans Changer "Without Changing"

== Family tree ==
Sheffield family tree: Barons Sheffield, Earls of Mulgrave and Dukes of Buckingham and Normanby

Baron Sheffield (1st creation, England), 1547
Edmund Sheffield; 1521–1549; 1st Baron Sheffield
John Sheffield (c. 1538–1568); 2nd Baron Sheffield
Earl of Mulgrave (1st creation), 1626
Edmund Sheffield (c. 1564–1646); 1st Earl of Mulgrave; 3rd Baron Sheffield
James II; 1633–1701; King of England and Scotland	Edmund Sheffield; 1611–1658; 2nd Earl of Mulgrave; 4th Baron Sheffield
Marquess of Normanby (1st creation), 1694; Duke of Buckingham and Normanby, 1703
Catherine Darnley; 1680–1743	John Sheffield; 1648–1721; 1st Duke of Buckingham and Normanby and Marquess of Normanby; 3rd Earl of Mulgrave; 5th Baron Sheffield
William Phipps	Catherine Annesley (d. 1743)	John Sheffield; 1710 styled Marquess of Nomanby	Robert Sheffield; 1711–1714 styled Marquess of Nomanby	Edmund Sheffield; 1716–1735; 2nd Duke of Buckingham and Normanby and Marquess of Normanby; 4th Earl of Mulgrave; 6th Baron Sheffield
Dukedom of Buckingham and Normanby, Marquess of Nomanby (1st creation), Earl of Mulgrave, and Baron Sheffield (1st creation) extinct, 1735
Baron Mulgrave (Ireland, 1st creation), 1767
Constantine Phipps (c. 1722–1775); 1st Baron Mulgrave
Baron Mulgrave (Great Britain, 1st creation), 1790	Baron Mulgrave (Great Britain (2nd creation), recreated, 1794; Viscount Normanby; Earl of Mulgrave (2nd creation), 1812	Baron Sheffield of Dunnamore in the County of Meath, (2nd creation, Ireland), 1781; Baron Sheffield of Roscommon in the County of Roscommon, (3rd creation, Ireland), 1783; Baron Sheffield of Sheffield in the County of York, (4th creation, United Kingdom), 1802; Earl of Sheffield (Ireland) and Viscount Pevensey (Ireland), 1816
Constantine John Phipps; 1744–1792; 2nd Baron Mulgrave (Ireland); 1st Baron Mulgrave (Great Britain)	Henry Phipps; 1755–1831; 1st Earl of Mulgrave, Viscount Normanby, and Baron Mulgrave (Great Britain), 3rd Baron Mulgrave (Ireland)	John Baker-Holroyd; 1735–1821; 1st Earl of Sheffield, Viscount Pevensey, and Baron Sheffield
Barony Mulgrave (Great Britain) extinct, 1792	Baron Stanley of Alderley, 1839
John Thomas Stanley; 1766–1850; 1st Baron Stanley	Maria Josepha Holroyd; 1771–1863
Marquess of Normanby (2nd creation), 1838	Baron Eddisbury, 1848
Constantine Henry Phipps; 1797–1863; 1st Marquess of Normanby; 2nd Earl of Mulgrave, Viscount Normanby, and Baron Mulgrave (Great Britain), 4th Baron Mulgrave (Ireland)	Edward John Stanley; 1802–1869; 2nd Baron Stanley; 1st Baron Eddisbury	George Augustus Frederick Charles Holroyd; 1802–1876; 2nd Earl of Sheffield, Viscount Pevensey, and Baron Sheffield
George Augustus Constantine Phipps; 1819–1890; 2nd Marquess of Normanby; 3rd Earl of Mulgrave, Viscount Normanby, and Baron Mulgrave (Great Britain), 5th Baron Mulgrave (Ireland)	Henry Edward John Stanley; 1827–1903; 3rd Baron Stanley; 2nd Baron Eddisbury	Fredrick Henry Stuart Holroyd; 1827–1829 styled Viscount Pevensey	Henry North Holroyd; 1832–1909; 3rd Earl of Sheffield, Viscount Pevensey, and Baron Sheffield
Earldom of Sheffield, Viscount Pevensey, and Baron Sheffield (2nd and 4th creations), extinct 1909
Constantine Charles Henry Phipps; 1846–1932; 3rd Marquess of Normanby; 4th Earl of Mulgrave, Viscount Normanby, and Baron Mulgrave (Great Britain), 6th Baron Mulgrave (Ireland)	Edward Lyulph Stanley; 1839–1925; 4th Baron Sheffield (3rd creation, Ireland); 4th Baron Stanley; 3rd Baron Eddisbury
Arthur Lyulph Stanley; 1875–1931; 5th Baron Sheffield; 5th Baron Stanley; 4th Baron Eddisbury	Oliver Hugh Stanley; 1879–1952
Oswald Constantine John Phipps; 1912–1994; 4th Marquess of Normanby; 5th Earl of Mulgrave, Viscount Normanby, and Baron Mulgrave (Great Britain), 7th Baron Mulgrave (Ireland)	Edward John Stanley; 1907–1971; 6th Baron Sheffield; 6th Baron Stanley; 5th Baron Eddisbury	Lyulph Henry Victor Owen Stanley; 1915–1971; 7th Baron Sheffield; 7th Baron Stanley; 6th Baron Eddisbury	Thomas Henry Oliver Stanley; 1927–2013; 8th Baron Sheffield; 8th Baron Stanley; 7th Baron Eddisbury
Constantine Edmund Walter Phipps (b. 1954); 5th Marquess of Normanby; 6th Earl of Mulgrave, Viscount Normanby, and Baron Mulgrave (Great Britain), 8th Baron Mulgrave (Ireland)	Richard Oliver Stanley (b. 1956); 9th Baron Sheffield; 9th Baron Stanley; 8th Baron Eddisbury	Charles Ernest Stanley (b. 1960)
Heir presumptive to the Baronies Sheffield, Stanley, and Eddisbury
John Samuel Constantine Phipps (b. 1994) styled Earl of Mulgrave	Thomas Henry Winston Phipps (b. 1997)	Oliver Richard Hugh Stanley; 1986–1989
Heir apparent to the Marquessate of Normanby

== See also ==
- Duke of Buckingham and Normanby
- Earl of Mulgrave
- Baron Stanley of Alderley
