= Pamela Stanley =

British actress (1909–1991)

- Born: Pamela Margaret Stanley; 6 September 1909; Nether Alderley, Cheshire, England
- Died: 30 June 1991 (aged 81); Leamington Spa, Warwickshire, England
- Education: Webber Douglas Academy of Dramatic Art
- Occupation: Actress
- Spouse: Sir David Cunynghame (m. 1941; died 1978)
- Parents: Margaret Evelyn Stanley (mother); Arthur Stanley, 5th Baron Sheffield (father)
- Relatives: Henry Evans-Gordon (grandfather); Venetia Stanley (aunt)

Pamela Margaret Stanley (6 September 1909 – 30 June 1991) was a British actress who appeared in a number of stage and film roles in Britain and the United States; the role with which she became most identified with was that of Queen Victoria.

== Biography ==
=== Early life ===
Stanley was born in Nether Alderley, Cheshire. She was the daughter of Sir Arthur Lyulph Stanley, the fifth Baron Stanley of Alderley and Margaret Evans-Gordon, the daughter of MP Henry Evans-Gordon. She spent her early childhood in Australia, where her father was Governor of Victoria between 1914 - 1919.

She was educated in France and Switzerland, later studying at the Webber Douglas School of Acting and Singing. Her mother was a noted amateur actress, descended from the Kemble family of actors.

=== Career ===
==== Theatre ====
She made her stage début in Derby Day in 1932 at the Lyric Theatre in Hammersmith. This was followed by six months at the Oxford Repertory Company in which she appeared as Mrs. Marwood in The Way of the World.

She appeared with Martin Harvey in Leopold David Lewis' The Bells (1933) at the Savoy Theatre, and also as Wendy in Peter Pan in 1934. In the same year she acted in two productions by Sir Robert Atkins at the Regent's Park Open Air Theatre, where she played Titania in A Midsummer Night's Dream with Phyllis Neilson-Terry, Leslie French, and Greer Garson as an uncredited extra; in The Tempest she was Miranda to John Drinkwater's Prospero, with Leslie French as Ariel and Atkins as Caliban.

Stanley appeared as Queen Victoria in Victoria Regina by Laurence Housman at the Gate Theatre in 1935, and in 1936 she played Ophelia in Hamlet on Broadway with Leslie Howard. However, John Gielgud had just ended a very successful Broadway run of the same play; the critics were not impressed and the show closed after 39 performances.

==== Film ====
She was cast as Queen Victoria in the 1936 film David Livingstone before returning to the Lyric for another season in Victoria Regina (1937–1938). The noted theatre critic James Agate compared Stanley's performance with a New York production starring Helen Hayes; unfortunately he found Hayes' portrayal of Queen Victoria like "a blazing sun, and I am so blinded by the dazzling performance of Helen Hayes that I literally cannot see Pamela Stanley." Nevertheless, he found the audience very appreciative: "All around me on the first night the air hummed with pretty comments, and blasts of Isn't she sweet? blew down my neck." But he thought that Stanley had "moments of real emotion which, being genuinely her own, genuinely move her audience." Contemporary photographs show that her resemblance to the queen was remarkable.

She appeared yet again as Victoria in the 1938 film Marigold.

== Family life ==
Stanley married David Cunynghame (Sir Henry David St Leger Brooke Selwyn Cunynghame, 11th Baronet Cunynghame; 1905–1978), in 1941, becoming Lady Cunynghame. They had three sons, Andrew, John and Arthur; Andrew succeeded his father as the twelfth baronet in 1978.

During the war, her husband and her lived at Overleigh House in Buckminster, Leicestershire.

David Cunynghame was a film production manager, and amongst other films he worked on: Things to Come with Ralph Richardson; three films starring Robert Donat (The Private Life of Henry VIII, The Ghost Goes West and Knight Without Armour with Marlene Dietrich); and two films by Michael Powell, The Lion Has Wings and The Thief of Bagdad.

=== Later career ===
Stanley made a brief return to the stage in 1968 when she appeared for the last time as Queen Victoria in The Queen’s Highland Servant by William Douglas-Home at the Savoy Theatre in London. According to the author's memoirs, this was his favourite play.

She made a final appearance in a small, uncredited part in The Last Hand Grenade as the Governor's Wife. The film, directed by Gordon Flemyng starred Stanley Baker, Honor Blackman and Richard Attenborough.

Stanley survived her husband (as the Dowager Lady Cunynghame) and died on 30 June 1991 aged eighty-one.

== Family tree ==
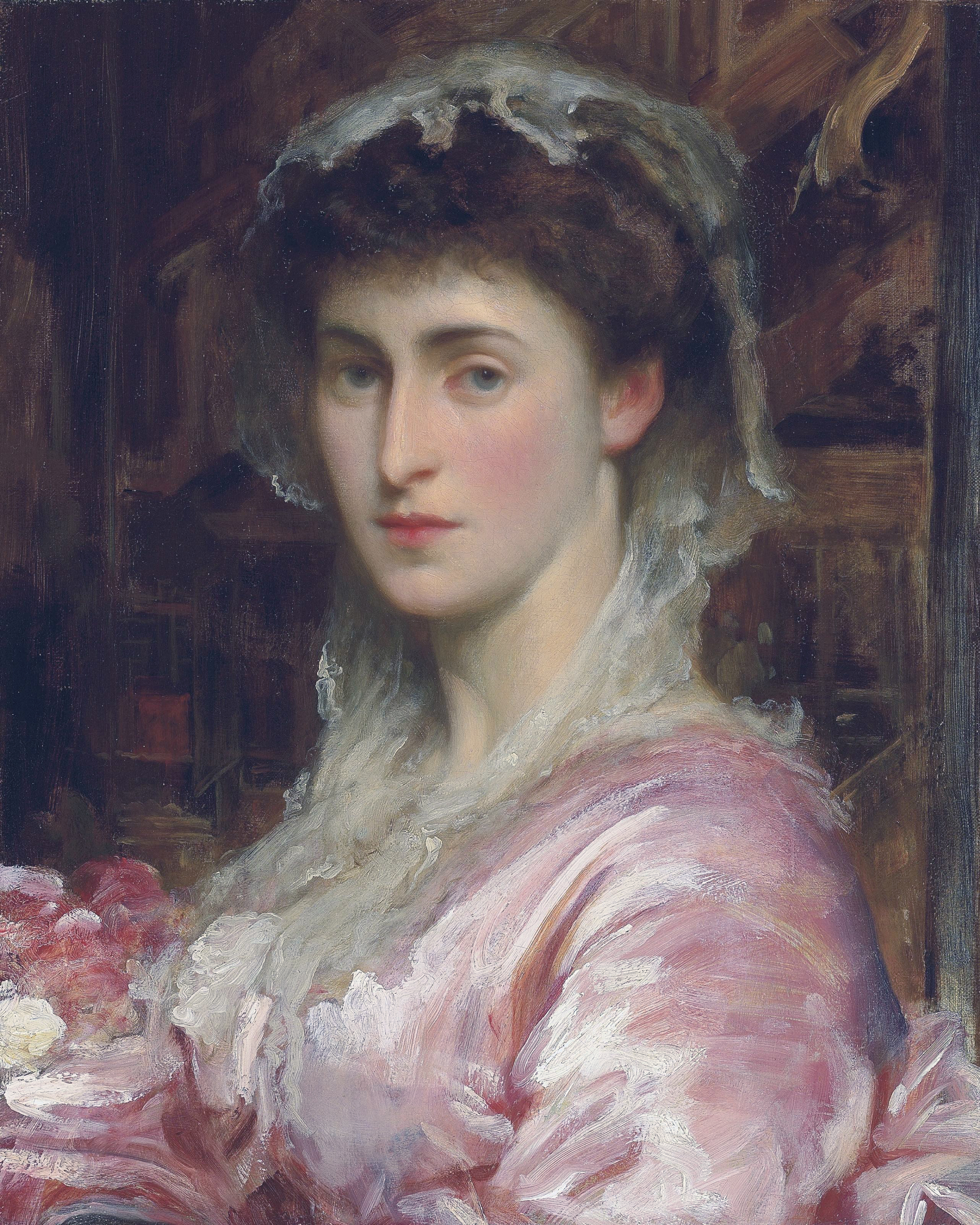
Her grandmother May in the early 1870s (Frederic Leighton, 1870s)

Her grandmother (Mrs. Henry Evans-Gordon) was born Mary Theodosia (May) Sartoris, and was painted several times by Frederic Leighton. May Sartoris' father Edward John Sartoris was Leighton's patron. Her brother married Nellie Grant, the daughter of Ulysses S. Grant. May's mother was the opera singer Adelaide Kemble (whose cousin, Gertrude Kemble, married Charles Santley); her aunt was Fanny Kemble and her great-aunt was Sarah Siddons.

Stanley's aunt (her father's sister) was Venetia Stanley who was the recipient of a great many letters from the Prime Minister, H. H. Asquith.

The Barons Stanley of Alderley and the Earls of Derby (the Stanleys of Bickerstaffe) are descended from Thomas Stanley, 1st Baron Stanley. The Derby Stakes were named after the 12th Earl of Derby, Edward Smith-Stanley, thus giving rise to the play in which Pamela Stanley made her stage début.

== Selected filmography ==
- David Livingstone (1936)
- Marigold (1938)

== Sources ==
- The American Film Institute Catalog of Motion Pictures Produced in the United States: Feature Films, 1961-1970. Berkeley: University of California Press, 1997 ISBN 0-520-20970-2 Google Books preview, accessed 25 June 2010
- Agate, James: Amazing Theatre. New York: Benjamin Blom, 1939. Reissued Ayer Publishing, 1972 ISBN 0-405-08181-2 Google Books preview, accessed 25 June 2010
- Cham, Elizabeth: Stanley, Sir Arthur Lyulph (1875–1931), in Australian Dictionary of Biography, Volume 12. Melbourne University Press, 1990
- Chapman, Don, Society for Theatre Research: Oxford Playhouse: high and low drama in a university city. University of Hertfordshire Press, 2009. ISBN 1-902806-87-5 Google Books preview, accessed 25 June 2010
- Croall, Jonathan: Gielgud: A Theatrical Life 1904-2000. Continuum, 2001. ISBN 978-0-8264-1333-8.
- Dymkowski, Christine (ed): The Tempest: Shakespeare in production. Cambridge University Press, 2000. ISBN 0-521-44407-1 Google Books preview, accessed 26 June 2010
- Elliot, William Gerald: In My Anecdotage. London: Philip Allan & Co., 1925
- Douglas-Home, William: Old Men Remember. Collins & Brown, 1991. ISBN 1-85585-002-8
- Kidd, Charles & Williamson, David (eds). Debrett's Peerage and Baronetage, (1990 edition). London: Palgrave Macmillan. ISBN 0-312-04640-5.
- Low, Rachael: The history of British film. London: Routledge, 1997 Google Books preview, accessed 25 June 2010
- Mitford, Nancy: The Stanleys of Alderley: their letters between the years 1851-1865. London: Chapman & Hall, 1939
- The National and English Review, Vol. 108. (July–December 1937) London, 1937.
- Parker, John: Who's who in the theatre, Volume 17, Part 1. Pitman, 1952 Google Books limited view, accessed 25 June 2010
- The Stage Year Book, 1969. Carson & Comerford, Ltd., 1969.
- Troyan, Michael: A Rose for Mrs. Miniver: The Life of Greer Garson. Lexington, KY: University Press of Kentucky, 2005 ISBN 0-8131-9150-5 Google Books preview, accessed 26 June 2010
