= Baron Stanley of Alderley =

Barony in the Peerage of the United Kingdom

Barony Stanley of Alderley
- Argent, on a bend azure three buck's heads cabossed or, a crescent for difference
- Creation date: 1839
- Created by: Queen Victoria
- First holder: Sir John Stanley, 7th Baronet
- Present holder: Richard Stanley, 9th Baron Stanley of Alderley
- Former seat: Alderley Park
- Motto: Sans changer ("without changing")

Baron Stanley of Alderley, in the County of Chester, is a title in the Peerage of the United Kingdom. It was created in 1839 for the politician and landowner Sir John Stanley, 7th Baronet.

== History ==
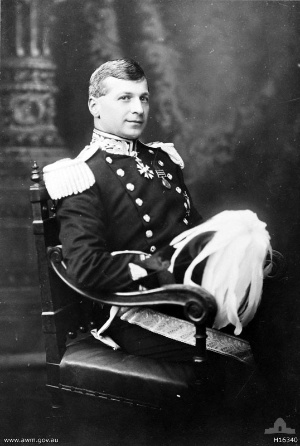
Arthur Stanley (1875–1931), 5th Baron Stanley of Alderley, 5th Baron Sheffield and 4th Baron Eddisbury

When the 1st Baron died in 1850, he was succeeded as 2nd Baron Stanley of Alderley and 8th Baronet of Alderley Hall by his son Edward, who was a prominent Liberal politician and notably served as President of the Board of Trade, Postmaster General and had in 1848 been created Baron Eddisbury, of Winnington in the County Palatine of Chester, in his own right. His wife Henrietta was a prominent campaigner for women's education. After his death, the Stanley of Alderley and Eddisbury baronies remained united; most holders have since chosen to be known as Lord Stanley of Alderley. The 3rd Baron Stanley of Alderley had a career in the Diplomatic Service; as he was childless he was succeeded by his younger brother, the 4th Baron. He was liberal member of parliament for Oldham. In 1909, the 4th Baron Stanley of Alderley acquired a further title when he succeeded his first cousin once removed, the Earl of Sheffield, according to a special remainder and thus inherited the title of 4th Baron Sheffield. After his death the titles passed to his son, the 5th Baron Stanley of Alderley. He was Liberal Member of Parliament for Eddisbury and also served as Governor of Victoria. His eldest son, the 6th Baron Stanley of Alderley, sold the family seat of Alderley Hall in 1938. He was married four times, the second time to Sylvia Ashley. On his death the titles passed to his younger brother, who preferred to be known as Lord Sheffield. He only held the titles for three months. As of 2013 the titles are held by the latter's cousin, the 9th Baron Stanley of Alderley, who succeeded his father in that year. He is the grandson of Oliver Hugh Stanley, youngest son of the 4th Baron.

The Stanley baronetcy, of Alderley Hall in the County of Chester, was created in the Baronetage of England in 1660 for the barrister Thomas Stanley. He was a descendant of Sir John Stanley, third son of Thomas Stanley, 1st Baron Stanley (whose eldest son was created Earl of Derby in 1485). He was succeeded by his son, the second Baronet. He was High Sheriff of Cheshire in 1678. His great-grandson, the sixth Baronet, was a Gentleman of the Privy Chamber. His eldest son was the seventh Baronet, who was elevated to the peerage in 1839. See above for further succession.

The Right Reverend Edward Stanley, second son of the sixth Baronet, was Bishop of Norwich. Venetia Stanley was the youngest daughter of the fourth Baron.

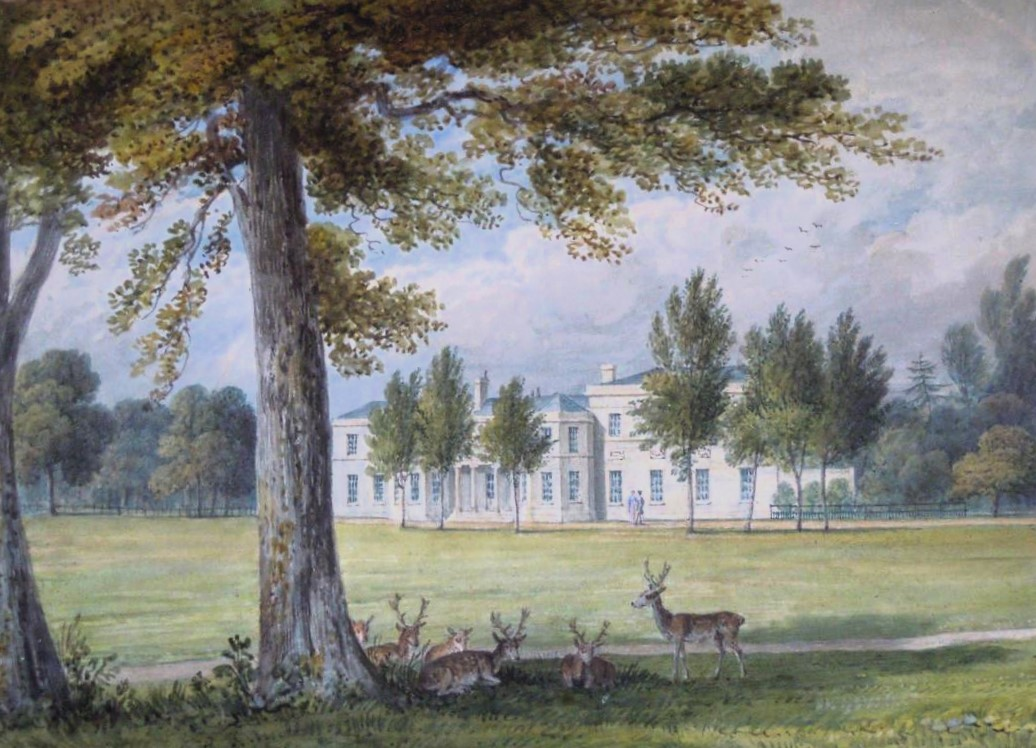
19th century sketch of Alderley Hall in Cheshire

The traditional burial place of the Lords Stanley of Alderley was the Stanley Mausoleum in the churchyard of St Mary, Nether Alderley, Cheshire, built in 1909. The building now belongs to the parish council. The London house of the Stanley family at 40 Dover Street was purchased by The Arts Club, a club for gentlemen interested in the arts, in 1896. It remains there to this day.

The family seat now is Rectory Farm, near Stanton St. John, Oxfordshire.

== Stanley baronets, of Alderley Hall (1660) ==
- Sir Thomas Stanley, 1st Baronet (1597–1672)
- Sir Peter Stanley, 2nd Baronet (1626–1683)
- Sir Thomas Stanley, 3rd Baronet (1652–1721)
- Sir James Stanley, 4th Baronet (died 1747)
- Sir Edward Stanley, 5th Baronet (died 1755)
- Sir John Thomas Stanley, 6th Baronet (1735–1807)
- Sir John Thomas Stanley, 7th Baronet (1766–1850) (created Baron Stanley of Alderley in 1839)

== Baron Stanley of Alderley (1839) ==
- John Thomas Stanley, 1st Baron Stanley of Alderley (1766–1850)
- Edward John Stanley, 2nd Baron Stanley of Alderley (1802–1869) (created Baron Eddisbury in 1848)
- Henry Edward John Stanley, 3rd Baron Stanley of Alderley and 2nd Baron Eddisbury (1827–1903)
- Edward Lyulph Stanley, 4th Baron Sheffield, 4th Baron Stanley of Alderley and 3rd Baron Eddisbury (1839–1925) (known as Lord Stanley of Alderley)
- Arthur Lyulph Stanley, 5th Baron Sheffield, 5th Baron Stanley of Alderley and 4th Baron Eddisbury (1875–1931) (known as Lord Stanley of Alderley)
- Edward John Stanley, 6th Baron Sheffield, 6th Baron Stanley of Alderley and 5th Baron Eddisbury (1907–1971) (known as Lord Stanley of Alderley)
- Lyulph Henry Victor Owen Stanley, 7th Baron Sheffield, 7th Baron Stanley of Alderley and 6th Baron Eddisbury (1915–1971) (known as Lord Sheffield)
- Thomas Henry Oliver Stanley, 8th Baron Sheffield, 8th Baron Stanley of Alderley and 7th Baron Eddisbury (1927–2013) (known as Lord Stanley of Alderley)
- Richard Oliver Stanley 9th Baron Stanley of Alderley, 8th Baron Eddisbury and 9th Baron Sheffield (born 1956)

The heir presumptive is the present holder's brother Hon. Charles Ernest Stanley (born 1960), who has three daughters. The next in line to the peerages is his brother Hon. Harry John Stanley (born 1963), whose heir is his only son Bertram Thomas Zulfikar Stanley (born 2007).

== Family tree ==
Sheffield family tree: Barons Sheffield, Earls of Mulgrave and Dukes of Buckingham and Normanby

Baron Sheffield (1st creation, England), 1547
Edmund Sheffield; 1521–1549; 1st Baron Sheffield
John Sheffield c. 1538–1568; 2nd Baron Sheffield
Earl of Mulgrave (1st creation), 1626
Edmund Sheffield c. 1564–1646; 1st Earl of Mulgrave, 3rd Baron Sheffield
James II; 1633–1701; King of England and Scotland	Edmund Sheffield; 1611–1658; 2nd Earl of Mulgrave, 4th Baron Sheffield
Marquess of Normanby (1st creation), 1694; Duke of Buckingham and Normanby, 1703
Catherine Darnley; 1680–1743	John Sheffield; 1648–1721; 1st Duke of Buckingham and Normanby, etc., 3rd Earl of Mulgrave, 5th Baron Sheffield
William Phipps	Catherine Annesley d. 1743	John Sheffield; 1710 styled Marquess of Nomanby	Robert Sheffield; 1711–1714 styled Marquess of Nomanby	Edmund Sheffield; 1716–1735; 2nd Duke of Buckingham and Normanby, etc., 4th Earl of Mulgrave, 6th Baron Sheffield
Dukedom of Buckingham and Normanby, Marquess of Nomanby (1st creation), Earl of Mulgrave, and Baron Sheffield (1st creation) extinct, 1735
Baron Mulgrave (Ireland, 1st creation), 1767
Constantine Phipps c. 1722–1775; 1st Baron Mulgrave
Baron Sheffield of Dunnamore in the County of Meath, (2nd creation, Ireland), 1781; Baron Sheffield of Roscommon in the County of Roscommon, (3rd creation, Ireland), 1783
Baron Mulgrave (Great Britain, 1st creation), 1790	Baron Mulgrave (Great Britain (2nd creation), recreated, 1794; Viscount Normanby; Earl of Mulgrave (2nd creation), 1812	Baron Sheffield of Sheffield in the County of York, (4th creation, United Kingdom), 1802; Earl of Sheffield (Ireland) and Viscount Pevensey (Ireland), 1816
Constantine John Phipps; 1744–1792; 2nd Baron Mulgrave (Ireland); 1st Baron Mulgrave (Great Britain)	Henry Phipps; 1755–1831; 1st Earl of Mulgrave, etc., 3rd Baron Mulgrave (Ireland)	John Baker-Holroyd; 1735–1821; 1st Earl of Sheffield, etc.
Barony Mulgrave (Great Britain) extinct, 1792	Baron Stanley of Alderley, 1839
John Thomas Stanley; 1766–1850; 1st Baron Stanley	Maria Josepha Holroyd; 1771–1863
Marquess of Normanby (2nd creation), 1838	Baron Eddisbury, 1848
Constantine Henry Phipps; 1797–1863; 1st Marquess of Normanby, 2nd Earl of Mulgrave, etc., 4th Baron Mulgrave (Ireland)	Edward John Stanley; 1802–1869; 2nd Baron Stanley, 1st Baron Eddisbury	George Augustus Frederick Charles Holroyd; 1802–1876; 2nd Earl of Sheffield, etc.
George Augustus Constantine Phipps; 1819–1890; 2nd Marquess of Normanby, 3rd Earl of Mulgrave, etc., 5th Baron Mulgrave (Ireland)	Henry Edward John Stanley; 1827–1903; 3rd Baron Stanley, 2nd Baron Eddisbury	Fredrick Henry Stuart Holroyd; 1827–1829 styled Viscount Pevensey	Henry North Holroyd; 1832–1909; 3rd Earl of Sheffield, etc.
Earldom of Sheffield, Viscount Pevensey, and Baron Sheffield (2nd and 4th creations), extinct 1909
Constantine Charles Henry Phipps; 1846–1932; 3rd Marquess of Normanby, 4th Earl of Mulgrave, etc., 6th Baron Mulgrave (Ireland)	Edward Lyulph Stanley; 1839–1925; 4th Baron Sheffield (3rd creation, Ireland); 4th Baron Stanley, 3rd Baron Eddisbury
Arthur Lyulph Stanley; 1875–1931; 5th Baron Sheffield, 5th Baron Stanley, 4th Baron Eddisbury	Oliver Hugh Stanley; 1879–1952
Oswald Constantine John Phipps; 1912–1994; 4th Marquess of Normanby, 5th Earl of Mulgrave, etc., 7th Baron Mulgrave (Ireland)	Edward John Stanley; 1907–1971; 6th Baron Sheffield, 6th Baron Stanley, 5th Baron Eddisbury	Lyulph Henry Victor Owen Stanley; 1915–1971; 7th Baron Sheffield, 7th Baron Stanley, 6th Baron Eddisbury	Thomas Henry Oliver Stanley; 1927–2013; 8th Baron Sheffield, 8th Baron Stanley, 7th Baron Eddisbury
Constantine Edmund Walter Phipps b. 1954; 5th Marquess of Normanby, 6th Earl of Mulgrave, etc., 8th Baron Mulgrave (Ireland)	Richard Oliver Stanley b. 1956; 9th Baron Sheffield, 9th Baron Stanley, 8th Baron Eddisbury	Charles Ernest Stanley b. 1960
Heir presumptive to the Baronies Sheffield, Stanley, and Eddisbury
John Samuel Constantine Phipps b. 1994 styled Earl of Mulgrave	Thomas Henry Winston Phipps b. 1997	Oliver Richard Hugh Stanley; 1986–1989
Heir apparent to the Marquessate of Normanby

== See also ==
- Audley-Stanley family
- Earl of Derby
- Baron Sheffield
- Baron Eddisbury
