= Margaret Evelyn Stanley =

British philanthropist (1875–1964)

The Right Honourable The Lady Stanley of Alderley
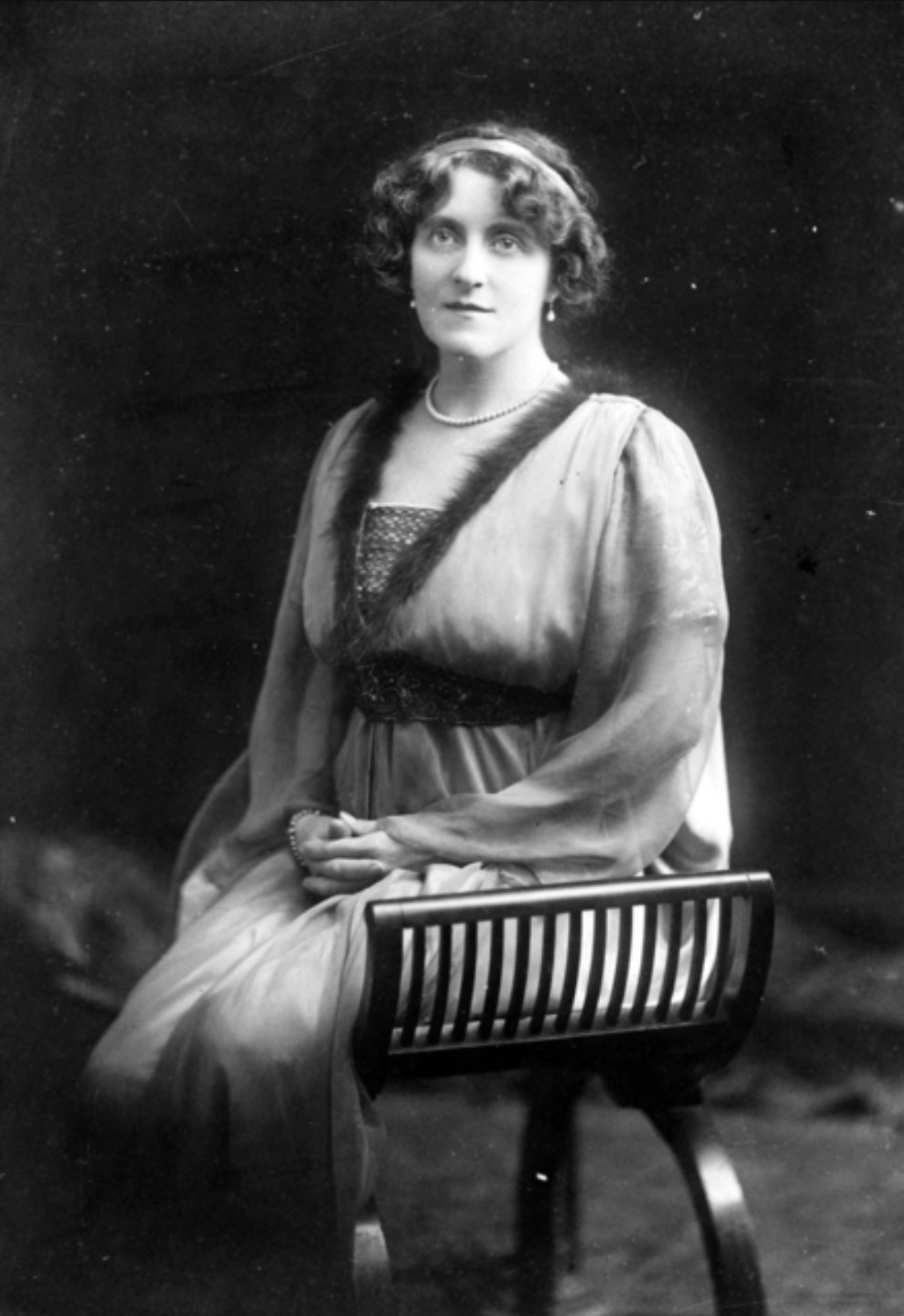
- Born: Margaret Evelyn Evans Gordon; 27 August 1875; Hampshire, England
- Died: 13 April 1964 (aged 88); Westminster, Middlesex, London, England, United Kingdom
- Known for: Founder and inaugural President of the Victorian division of the Australian Red Cross
- Spouse: Arthur Stanley (m. 1905; died 1931)

Margaret Evelyn Stanley, Baroness Stanley of Alderley (née Evans Gordon; 27 August 1875 – 13 April 1964), was the founder and president of the Victorian division of the Australian Red Cross.

== Early life and family ==
Stanley was born on the 27th August 1875 to Mary Theodosia Sartoris and Henry Evans Gordon in Hampshire, England. One of four children, she grew up at Prestons in Ightham, Kent to a family that mixed in intellectual and artistic social circles.

Stanley's maternal grandmother was opera singer Adelaide Kemble of the Kemble family, and her maternal grandfather was Edward John Sartoris. Her mother, Mary, who was known as May, was an amateur actress and singer, and was the subject of a number of paintings by Frederic Leighton. Stanley's maternal uncle, Algernon Sartoris, married Nellie Grant.

Stanley's paternal uncle was William Evans-Gordon, and her paternal aunt was Jessica Evans Gordon who married Thomas Gibson Bowles.

Stanley married Arthur Lyulph Stanley, in 1905. They had five children, Adelaide, Edward John, Pamela, Lyulph, and Victoria.

== Career ==
When World War I broke out in August 1914, Lady Helen Munro Ferguson appointed Stanley as a member of the central branch of the Australian Red Cross, which Ferguson had formed in response to the war. Ferguson also invited Stanley to form and preside over the Victorian division as its president. She was the first president of the Victorian division of the Australian Red Cross.

Stanley's husband had been appointed the Governor of Victoria in 1913, Stanley and her family moved to Australia in early 1914, and took up residence in Stonnington mansion, which served as the State Government House. At that time, Canberra had not been established as the federal capital, so the Australian Governor General resided in Government House, Melbourne. As Munro Ferguson had chosen the wives of the Governors of each state to found and preside over their states division, they were able to use the large state government house buildings as headquarters of their divisions. However, as the wife of the Australian Governor General, Munro Ferguson was using her own residence as the headquarters of the National Red Cross Headquarters. Instead, Stanley ran the state division headquarters from the Old Treasury Building on Spring Street.

While she took pride in the charity work she undertook, and the media Stanley did not enjoy her vice-regal duties that came with being a spouse of the Governor of Victoria. She did not like the order and methodical nature of the duties, which were overseen by the private secretary to the Governor, the Hon. Victor Nelson Hood, with whom she did not get along. Stanley prioritised her family over vice-regal duties. This also caused problems with her role at the Red Cross. Munro Ferguson was fighting to keep the Red Cross as a woman's organisation, with women in the top positions, however sixteen months in she felt the success of the organisation was leading to men ousting the women she had put in charge. She expressed frustration in what she saw as Stanley's husband Arthur sweeping Stanley aside from her duties as president of the Victorian division.

During the five year period that she lived in Australia from 1914 until 1919, Stanley gave birth to her two youngest children, Lyulph and Victoria, and she experienced a miscarriage. The combination of her pregnancies and her home sickness impacted her health and in early 1918, Stanley began to worry that she had heart disease. Doctors could not find a physical cause, and diagnosed a nervous breakdown, and she was admitted to a nursing home to recuperate.

At the invitation of Edith Onions, Stanley became the patron and president of The City Newsboys Club, a charity which she was most proud of being involved with. Onions took her to visit the homes of the Newsboys' families.

Stanley was associated with several organisations while she was in Australia. Some of these were:

- Patron and president of the Victorian Bush Nursing Association.
- Patron of the Young Women's Christian Association.
- Patron of The Free Kindergarten Union of Victoria.
- Patron of the Austral Salon.
- President of the Queens Fund.
- President of the Victorian League, and the Mount Macedon branch.
- President of the Victorian Society for the Prevention of Cruelty to Children.
- President of the state divisions of the Victorian Mothers Union.

Stanley left Australia for England on 21 March 1919 on the R.M.S. Osterley. several thousand people attended to see her off, and the Newsboys formed a guard of honour, and the crowd sang Auld Lang Syne. The Newsboys presented her with a boomerang which stated "All trust that like the boomerang, you will come back". Stanley told them that she was "relinquishing my presidency, but not my friendship".

In 1923 on a return trip to Australia, Stanley laid the foundation stone on the new City Newsboys Society clubhouse on the corner of Little Collins and Alfred Place on May 24. On this trip she also attended a picnic for the Old Boys wives and children, and at the Menzies Hotel, Onians introduced her to a former newsboy, Squizzy Taylor. During this meeting Taylor gifted Stanley with a silver box inscribed with "To Lady Stanley, from one misunderstood to one who understands! Leslie Taylor". Stanley was touched by the compliment, and treasured the box for the rest of her life.

== Death ==
Stanley died in Westminster, London, England on 13 April 1964 aged 88. Her funeral took place at the Golders Green Crematorium on April 15, and her ashes were buried at Alderley, Cheshire on April 16.
