= Venetia Stanley (1887–1948) =

British aristocrat and socialite (1887–1948)

The Honourable Beatrice Venetia Stanley
- Venetia Stanley in 1915; Photograph by Dorothy Hickling
- Born: 22 August 1887
- Died: 3 August 1948 (aged 60)
- Known for: Relationship with Prime Minister H. H. Asquith
- Spouse: Edwin Montagu (m. 1915; died 1924)
- Children: Judy Montagu
- Father: Edward Stanley, 4th Baron Stanley of Alderley
- Relatives: Lowthian Bell (maternal grandfather); Edward Stanley, 2nd Baron Stanley of Alderley (paternal grandfather); Henrietta Dillon-Lee (paternal grandmother); Arthur Stanley, 5th Baron Stanley of Alderley (brother)

Beatrice Venetia Stanley Montagu (22 August 1887 – 3 August 1948) was a British aristocrat and socialite best known for the many letters that Prime Minister H. H. Asquith wrote to her between 1910 and 1915. Venetia was a namesake and collateral descendant of Venetia Stanley (1600–1633).

== Family ==
Venetia Stanley was born on 22 August 1887, the youngest daughter of Edward Stanley, 4th Baron Stanley of Alderley and his wife, Mary Katharine (1848–1929), daughter of Sir Isaac Lowthian Bell of Washington, County Durham.

Venetia’s father succeeded his eldest brother, Henry Stanley, 3rd Baron Stanley of Alderley, in 1903, and by special remainder succeeded to the barony of Sheffield on the death in 1909 of his kinsman Henry North Holroyd, 3rd Earl of Sheffield.

Venetia had three brothers, Arthur, Edward John and Oliver Hugh, and five sisters, Katharine Florence Clementine (died whilst young), Henrietta Margaret, Sylvia Laura and Blanche Florence Daphne.

Her father had been the Liberal MP for Oldham from 1880 to 1885, after which he concentrated on educational reform. On his succession to the peerage in 1903 Stanley inherited estates at Alderley Park, Cheshire and Penrhos house, Anglesey.

== The Coterie ==
Venetia Stanley was a member of the Coterie, a set of English aristocrats and intellectuals of the 1910s who were frequently featured in magazines and newspapers of the period. They met regularly at balls, dinners, and country house parties, participating in activities such as treasure hunts, fancy dress balls, and poker games. They held late-night parties that received coverage from the press.

== The Asquith correspondence ==
Stanley and Asquith initially became acquainted through her childhood friendship with his daughter, Violet Asquith. Asquith admitted that he had 'a slight weakness for the companionship of clever and attractive women'. By 1907, when Stanley was 20, she was enrolled in what his wife, Margot, banteringly called his 'little harem'.

Stanley's special relationship with the Prime Minister and his family may date from December 1909, when Violet Asquith's admirer, Archibald "Archie" Ian Gordon, died as a result of a motoring accident, and Stanley, by now Violet's closest woman friend, proved how effective she could be in the role of comforter.

The earliest of Asquith's extant letters to her were written in September 1910 and in the second general election of that year she went with Violet to some of his election meetings. At this time Stanley was just one of several women who received Asquith's letters. He enjoyed writing letters to women in high society.

In 1912 Asquith and Edwin Montagu, a Liberal MP who was one of Asquith's protégés, went to Sicily on holiday. Asquith had persuaded Stanley to leave a skiing trip in Switzerland to come with Violet to join him and Montagu in Sicily. Their arrival was slightly delayed owing to Violet having had tonsillitis.

Letter-writing was one of Asquith's recreations. Asquith was an extremely assiduous correspondent. He wrote almost entirely to his women friends, mostly personal letters of no great political interest. He sought from his correspondence 'not counsel', 'but comfort, communication and relief'. He told a cabinet colleague in 1912 that 'he knew how to write to people in accordance with the prospect of letters being retained or destroyed; and he wrote accordingly'. The letters written to Stanley from March 1914 to May 1915 are the exception to this. Although Asquith knew that they were being kept he filled them with personal, political and military secrets of every kind, and they include constant appeals for Stanley's counsel. They constitute the most remarkable self-revelation ever given by a British Prime Minister.

After 1912 his letters to Stanley became more frequent, and he contrived to meet her when she was in London. Although, unlike the earlier Venetia Stanley (1600–1633), she had few pretensions to beauty, she was bright, intelligent, sympathetic, classically educated, well-read and fond of fun.

Stanley seems to have written to Asquith almost as often, but Asquith apparently destroyed Stanley's letters. More than 560 of Asquith's letters to Stanley, running to some 300,000 words have survived. Almost all were written between January 1912 and May 1915. The correspondence started with a 'faint trickle' in 1910 and 1911, became 'substantially more' in 1912, there were about 50 in 1913, mostly of substantial length, and by 1914 they became 'a flood'. From July 1914 Asquith wrote at least once a day.

Stanley and Asquith also saw each other quite often. On most Friday afternoons, when they were both in London, they would find time to go for a motor drive, seated behind a chauffeur in his recently acquired Napier, they would sometimes meet at luncheon or dinner or evening parties, and occasionally Asquith would pay an early evening call on her at her parents’ house in Mansfield Street. Asquith would stay once or twice a year at one of Lord Sheffield’s residences.

In early 1914 he was writing about three times a week, and by the end of March 1914 he was discussing the problems of the premiership with her. He looked back to the Curragh incident in that month as one during which she had been his regular 'counsellor'. Asquith later reminded Stanley of the stage ". . . when we began to talk not only of persons and books but of . . . my interests, politics, etc., and I began to acquire the habit, first of taking you into confidence, and then of consulting and relying on your judgment".

There has been some debate as to whether the affair was sexually consummated or not. Brock & Brock, editors of H.H. Asquith: Letters to Venetia Stanley (1982) maintain

it is almost certain that Asquith never became Venetia's lover in the physical sense; and it is unlikely that he even wished for this. The romantic ardour which he sustained is not easy to envisage in our age of 'permissiveness' and post-Freudian introspection. By the middle of 1914 he was deeply in love. He was becoming dependent on Venetia and the signs are that this had begun to alarm her. When he stayed for Whitsun at the other Stanley estate, Penrhos, near Holyhead, his chances of resolving the Home Rule crisis were fading and she saved him, in his own later words, 'from something very like despair'; but before he left she seems to have warned him that he could not long remain the only man in her life.

Violet Asquith supported this view, commenting in 1964 "it cannot be true. Venetia was so plain"; although at the time Lady Diana Manners thought differently. She was apparently invited to replace Venetia, but did not respond.

== Marriage ==
Mrs Beatrice Stanley Montagu in 1917, two years after her marriage to Edwin Montagu in 1915.

Whether or not Stanley became the premier's mistress, by the early months of 1915, his dependence on her had become almost obsessional. For example, on 30 March he wrote to her four times.

After their trip to Sicily in 1912, Stanley corresponded with Edwin Montagu. They exchanged more than thirty letters, Montagu increasingly expressing his desire for her.

Sometime before 4 August 1912, Montagu mustered enough courage to propose marriage. Stanley rejected him. On August 4, 1912, he wrote that when she turned him down, he had thought of severing all ties with her, but he changed his mind: why should he lose her friendship, which meant so much to him? Also, he clung, uncharacteristically, to optimism. As long as she was unmarried, there was hope.

After her refusal, Montagu travelled to India for six months, resolving to now view Stanley as a friend to whom one drops a line and not as a lover to whom one bares one’s soul. Their correspondence continued with her letters getting longer and his shorter. By the summer of 1913 Montagu had forgotten his resolve; he began to court Stanley again, and he proposed again at the end of September. He was rejected again, but he assured Stanley he would not give up the struggle.

Montagu continued to pursue Stanley during 1914. Both of them were close to Asquith and neither of them wanted to hurt him, but by the end of April 1915, she had made up her mind to marry Edwin.

Asquith, like others, believed that Stanley's refusal to marry Edwin in 1912 represented her settled will. By 1915, the war had altered her attitude more than the premier realised, as young men were being killed at the front.

Montagu was subject to a provision in his father's will intended to deprive him of a substantial inheritance if he married outside the Jewish faith, but the conventions which had come near to barring a religious conversion such as this were losing their force.

On 12 May 1915, Asquith was appalled to receive Stanley's letter announcing her engagement to Montagu. This shock may well have affected his handling of the coalition crisis, which erupted two days later. The end came at the worst possible time, but after giving him some years of help and support, this romantic friendship had reached an intensity which spelt danger whenever it might end.

Stanley's conversion was, as Stanley told Montagu, a farce. She went through the motions in order to save his family fortune. She complained that the process was boring, but in the end she memorised enough of the text to pass the test and was received into the Jewish faith.

Stanley and Montagu were married on 26 July 1915.

Stanley’s family and friends differed in their attitudes toward the marriage. Her father, then seventy-seven, was furious at his daughter’s conversion and in the days following the announcement refused to talk to either Stanley or Montagu. He “boycotted” them, to use Venetia’s term for her father’s reaction. Montagu’s family was less critical as Stanley was going to convert into their faith.

== War service ==
On 6 January 1915 Stanley commenced three months nurse training as a paying probationer under Matron Eva Luckes at The London Hospital, Whitechapel.

After her training Stanley signed up as a VAD nurse at Lady Norman's war hospital at Wimereux, France in May 1915. She went on to nurse with the British Red Cross Society and at home in Charing Cross and Rutland Hospitals in 1916.

== Later life ==
On 6 February 1923, she bore a daughter named Judith (known as "Judy") who, while officially Montagu's daughter, may also have been the result of an affair between Stanley and William Ward, 3rd Earl of Dudley.

Despite Stanley's affairs, her marriage lasted until Montagu's premature death on 7 November 1924.

Once a widow, she renewed her friendship with Asquith. Stanley wrote to him shortly after Montagu’s death; it was the first letter she had written him in nearly ten years. Over the next few years, they continued to exchange letters, but none of substance.

In November 1927 Asquith paid his last visit to Stanley. At various times in 1927 he had suffered from a loss of power in one leg. When he reached home after this visit this trouble returned and he could not get out of the car without help. He never left home again and died in February 1928.

Stanley reputedly had several affairs, including an extended one with the press magnate Lord Beaverbrook which started in 1919. The letters written immediately after Montagu’s death, and throughout the rest of the 1920s, have an intimacy that suggests that they were still lovers. Beaverbrook's relationship with Stanley was more than a sexual excursion. He genuinely liked her, admired her intelligence and respected her political acumen. She admired his brilliance and political power, and she needed his financial help.

In 1927 Beaverbrook took Stanley, Diana Cooper, Valentine Castlerosse, and Arnold Bennett to Germany. Lord Castlerosse has been described as “gross in appetite and appearance, with nimble wit concealed beneath a buffoon’s exterior . . . Beaverbrook’s court jester.’’ “What is your handicap?’’ Nancy Cunard asked him on the golf course. “Drink and debauchery,” he answered. This was exactly the company Stanley loved to keep. Arnold Bennett was reported to have been shocked “by the coarseness of the conversation between Beaverbrook and Castlerosse in front of the women. Venetia and Diana were far from shocked. Their own interest in sex prompted them to go with Castlerosse on a tour of transvestite nightclubs in Berlin.

In 1928 the Liberal Party invited her to stand as a parliamentary candidate for South Norfolk, where she had inherited Montagu's country house in Attleborough, but she declined the offer. She maintained that she lacked the discipline necessary for sustained work. There was little “fun” in being a Member of Parliament. She had seen the price Montagu had paid for the honour. While she enjoyed discussing politics, she was not prepared to work on behalf of her convictions.

After being widowed, she took an interest in flying. In 1931, she embarked on a 6,000-mile adventure in a DH Gypsy Moth piloted by Rupert Belleville. The journey took them across Russia, the Middle East and Persia. Of the journey she said, "We are going for fun only, in the simplest, cheapest, and most modern way of seeing the world". The journey was eventful: after landing on a shallow lake on the way to Sofia with no ill effects, they crashed and their plane was destroyed by fire near Sabzawar in Persia. After a delay of a few weeks they purchased another Gypsy Moth and continued their flight northwards to Moscow. In 1932 Stanley ventured out again on a flight to Saigon.

Venetia Stanley Montagu died of cancer at her Norfolk home, Breccles Hall, near Attleborough, on 3 August 1948, shortly before her 61st birthday.

The trove of Asquith's many letters to Stanley came to light after her death. Venetia's daughter Judy surprised Sir Martin Gilbert, the official biographer of Winston Churchill, by turning up with a laundry basket full of the letters. (Note: When Asquith’s letters to Venetia were published in 1982, edited by Michael and Eleanor Brock, only around half of the total 300,000 words were included. Buczacki has read the other half and found that the editors omitted a lot of social gossip and an even larger quantity of 'desperately boring material. . .')

== In popular culture ==
Susan Howatch's 1990 novel Scandalous Risks is a fictionalised version of the relationship between Venetia Stanley ("Venetia Flaxton") and H. H. Asquith ("Neville Aysgarth"), but set in the early 1960s.

Bobbie Neate's 2012 work Conspiracy of Secrets claims, unsupported by evidence, that her stepfather Louis Stanley was the illegitimate son of Asquith and Venetia Stanley.

Robert Harris's 2024 novel Precipice is set immediately before and during the first years of World War I. It includes extracts from Asquith's letters to Stanley.
