= David Livingstone (film) =

1936 British film by James A. FitzPatrick

- Trade show advertisement from The Daily Film Renter (3 November 1936)
- Directed by: James A. FitzPatrick
- Written by: W.K. Williamson
- Produced by: James A. Fitzpatrick
- Starring: Percy Marmont; Marian Spencer; James Carew; Pamela Stanley
- Cinematography: Hone Glendinning
- Music by: Gideon Fagan
- Production company: FitzPatrick Pictures
- Distributed by: MGM
- Release date: November 1936
- Running time: 71 minutes
- Country: United Kingdom
- Language: English

David Livingstone (also known as The Life of Livingstone) is a 1936 British historical adventure film directed by James A. FitzPatrick and starring Percy Marmont, Marian Spencer and James Carew. It was written by W.K. Williamson and was made at Shepperton Studios for distribution by MGM.

== Preservation status ==
The British Film Institute National Archive holds no stills or ephemera, and no film or video materials.

== Premise ==
The film portrays the expedition of the British explorer David Livingstone to Africa to discover the source of the Nile, his disappearance, and the expedition to find him led by Stanley.

== Main cast ==
- Percy Marmont as David Livingstone
- Marian Spencer as Mary Moffatt
- James Carew as Gordon Bennett
- Pamela Stanley as Queen Victoria
- Hugh McDermott as H.M. Stanley

== Reception ==
The Monthly Film Bulletin wrote: "Care has obviously been taken not to offend religious susceptibilities, but there is throughout a lack of inspiration which makes the record unconvincing. We are told of great and wonderful work, but we are not made to realise it. ... Percy Marmont gives a careful and painstaking performance in the name-part. The remainder of the cast seem uncomfortable in their roles, and there is a frequent tendency to overact."

Kine Weekly wrote: "Sincere documentary drama illustrating profoundly and with unobtrusive showmanship the big moments in the adventurous and praiseworthy life of David Livingstone."

The Daily Film Renter wrote: "Sincere picturisation of events in life of David Livingstone, from his first African trip to tragic death while exploring source of Nile. ... Offering likely to go well in specialised halls as documentary subject, high praise being merited by sympathetic treatment."
