= Stanley baronets =

Set index for Stanley baronets

There have been four baronetcies created for persons with the surname Stanley, all in the Baronetage of England. Two of the creations are extant as of 2010.

- Stanley baronets of Bickerstaffe (1627): see Earl of Derby
- Stanley baronets of Alderley Hall (1660): see Baron Stanley of Alderley
- Stanley baronets of Hooton (1661), later Stanley-Massey-Stanley baronets, later Errington baronets
- Stanley baronets of Grange Gorman (1699): see Sir John Stanley, 1st Baronet (1663–1744)
