= Edward Stanley, 4th Baron Stanley of Alderley =

English peer (1839–1925)

The Right Honourable The Lord Stanley of Alderley PC
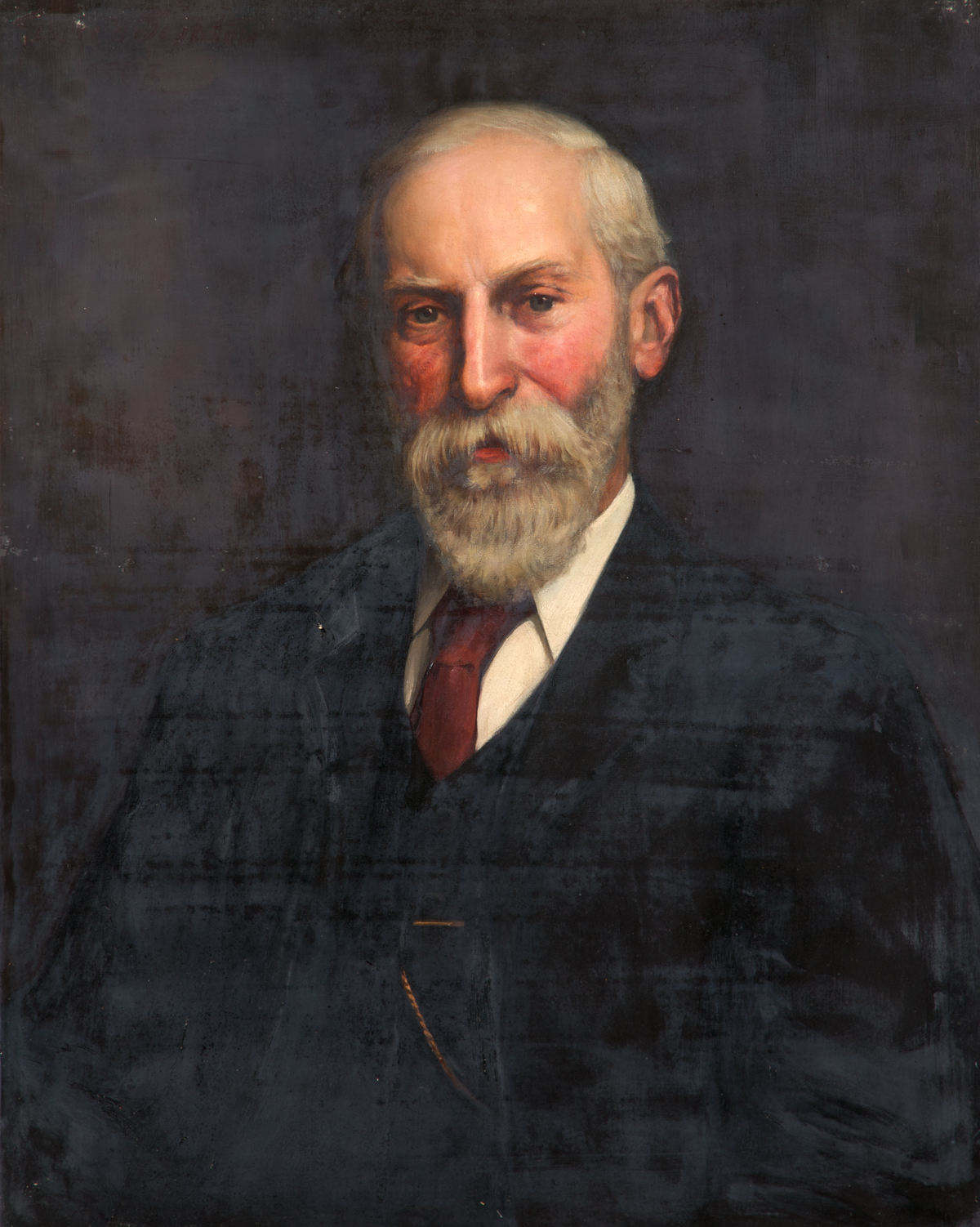

Member of Parliament for Oldham
- In office 27 April 1880 – 18 December 1885
- Preceded by: Frederick Spinks
- Succeeded by: James Mackenzie Maclean

Member of the House of Lords Lord Temporal
- In office 11 December 1903 – 18 March 1925; Hereditary peerage
- Preceded by: The 3rd Baron Stanley of Alderley
- Succeeded by: The 5th Baron Stanley of Alderley

Personal details
- Born: 16 May 1839
- Died: 18 March 1925 (aged 85)
- Party: Liberal Party
- Children: 8, including Arthur and Venetia

Edward Lyulph Stanley, 4th Baron Sheffield, 4th Baron Stanley of Alderley and 3rd Baron Eddisbury PC (16 May 1839 – 18 March 1925) was an English peer.

== Life ==
He was the son of Edward Stanley, 2nd Baron Stanley of Alderley, and the former Hon. Henrietta Dillon-Lee. He attended Eton College between 1851 and 1857, gaining the Tomline Prize for mathematics in 1857. He read Greats at Balliol College, Oxford, graduating with a first-class Bachelor of Arts (BA) degree in 1861. He was elected fellow of Balliol the following year. He was called to the bar in 1865. He resigned his Oxford fellowship in July 1869 protest the required "conformity to the established church" (i.e. the Church of England) that academics had to profess; he had, by then, become an agnostic. His anti-clericalism was expressed in the pamphlet Oxford University Reform, published the same year.

Stanley was a member of the Liberation Society which campaigned for disestablishment of the Church of England. He also campaigned for the secular control of education. He was a member of the London School Board from 1876 to 1885 and also from 1888 to 1896. He wrote a book Our National Education (1899).

Stanley (then known as the Honourable Edward Lyulph Stanley) contested Oldham, in the Liberal interest, at elections in 1872, 1874, 1880 and 1885. He only won the 1880 contest and served in the House of Commons during the 1880–1885 Parliament. He inherited the title of Baron Stanley of Alderley in 1904, following the death of his brother. He was appointed a Privy Counsellor (PC) in 1910.

== Family ==
Stanley married Mary Katherine Bell, daughter of Lowthian Bell, on 6 February 1873. They had eight children:

- Katharine Florence Clementine Stanley (died 1884)
- Henrietta Margaret Stanley (1874–1956), married William Edmund Goodenough.
- Arthur Stanley, 5th Baron Stanley of Alderley (1875–1931)
- Edward John Stanley (1878–1908)
- Lt.-Col. Oliver Hugh Stanley (1879–1952)
- Sylvia Laura Stanley (1882–1980), married Anthony Morton Henley, and was mother of Rosalind Pitt-Rivers.
- Blanche Florence Daphne Stanley (1885–1968), married Eric Pearce-Serocold.
- Beatrice Venetia Stanley (1887–1948)

== Arms ==
Coat of arms of Edward Stanley, 4th Baron Stanley of Alderley
Crest On a chapeau gules, turned up ermine, an eagle with wings expanded or preying upon an infant proper, swaddled gules, handed argent. Escutcheon Argent, on a bend azure, three bucks' heads cabossed or, a crescent for difference. Supporters Dexter, a stag or, gorged with a ducal crown, line reflexed over the back, and charged on the shoulder with a mullet azure; sinister, a lion reguardant proper, gorged with a plain collar argent charged with three escallops gules. Motto Sans Changer "Without Changing"

Parliament of the United Kingdom
Preceded by Frederick Lowten Spinks; John Tomlinson Hibbert	Member of Parliament for Oldham; 1880 – 1885; With: John Tomlinson Hibbert	Succeeded by James Mackenzie Maclean; John Tomlinson Hibbert
Peerage of the United Kingdom
Preceded by Henry Stanley	Baron Stanley of Alderley; Baron Eddisbury; 1903–1925	Succeeded by Arthur Lyulph Stanley
Peerage of Ireland
Preceded by Henry North Holroyd	Baron Sheffield; 1909–1925	Succeeded by Arthur Lyulph Stanley
