= Edward Stanley, 6th Baron Stanley of Alderley =

English peer (1907-1971)

The Right Honourable The Lord Stanley of Alderley

Member of the House of Lords Lord Temporal
- In office 22 August 1931 – 3 March 1971; Hereditary Peerage
- Preceded by: The 5th Baron Stanley of Alderley
- Succeeded by: The 7th Baron Stanley of Alderley

Personal details
- Born: 9 October 1907
- Died: 3 March 1971 (aged 63)
- Spouse(s): Victoria Audrey Beatrice Chetwynd-Talbot (m. 1932; div. 1936) Edith Louisa Sylvia Ashley (m. 1944; div. 1948) Thérèse Husson (m. 1951; div. 1957) Kathleen Margaret Crane (m. 1961; died 1971)
- Children: 1 daughter
- Parents: Arthur Stanley, 5th Baron Stanley of Alderley (1875–1931) (father); Margaret Evelyn Stanley (1875-1964) (mother)
- Education: Eton College
- Alma mater: Balliol College, Oxford

Edward John Stanley, 6th Baron Sheffield, 6th Baron Stanley of Alderley, and 5th Baron Eddisbury (9 October 1907 – 3 March 1971), was a British peer.

He was the son of the Arthur Stanley, 5th Baron Stanley of Alderley (1875–1931) and Margaret Evelyn Evans Gordon (1875–1964). He was educated at Eton and Balliol College, Oxford.

Lord Stanley oversaw the loss of the family's ancestral estate at Alderley Park. With a fondness for gambling, wine and marriage, he had to pay for four divorce settlements, and death duties, even at pre-war levels, for both the 4th and 5th Barons. When the mansion at Alderley Park was destroyed by fire in 1931 he moved into the former farmhouse. When he sold the estate in 1938 to the property developers Hambling Crundall and Co Ltd., many of his older tenants were forced to leave the village.

He had four wives:

- Lady Victoria Audrey Beatrice Chetwynd-Talbot (married 3 March 1932 – divorced 1936). Died 1994.
- Edith Louisa Sylvia Ashley (married 18 January 1944 – divorced 1948). Died 1977.
- Thérèse Husson (married 6 April 1951 – divorced 1957)
- Kathleen Margaret Crane (née Wright) (married 15 September 1961 – his death 1971). Died 1996.

He and Victoria had one daughter, The Hon. Edwina Maureen Stanley (born 19 January 1933). On his death in 1971, his brother Lyulph Stanley succeeded to his titles, albeit only briefly.

== Arms ==
Coat of arms of Edward Stanley, 6th Baron Stanley of Alderley
Crest On a chapeau gules, turned up ermine, an eagle with wings expanded or preying upon an infant proper, swaddled gules, handed argent. Escutcheon Argent, on a bend azure, three bucks' heads cabossed or, a crescent for difference. Supporters Dexter, a stag or, gorged with a ducal crown, line reflexed over the back, and charged on the shoulder with a mullet azure; sinister, a lion reguardant proper, gorged with a plain collar argent charged with three escallops gules. Motto Sans Changer "Without Changing"

Peerage of the United Kingdom
Preceded by Arthur Lyulph Stanley	Baron Stanley of Alderley; 1931–1971	Succeeded by Lyulph Stanley
Preceded by Arthur Lyulph Stanley	Baron Eddisbury; 1931–1971	Succeeded by Lyulph Stanley
Peerage of Ireland
Preceded by Arthur Lyulph Stanley	Baron Sheffield; 1931–1971	Succeeded by Lyulph Stanley
