= Arthur Stanley, 5th Baron Stanley of Alderley =

British nobleman

The Right Honourable The Lord Stanley of Alderley KCMG
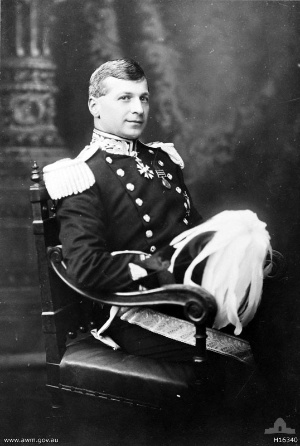

14th Governor of Victoria
- In office 23 February 1914 – 30 January 1920
- Monarch: George V
- Preceded by: Sir John Fuller, 1st Baronet
- Succeeded by: Earl of Stradbroke

Member of Parliament for Eddisbury
- In office 8 February 1906 – 10 February 1910
- Preceded by: Henry James Tollemache
- Succeeded by: Harry Barnston

Member of the House of Lords Lord Temporal
- In office 18 March 1925 – 22 August 1931; Hereditary Peerage
- Preceded by: The 4th Baron Stanley of Alderley
- Succeeded by: The 6th Baron Stanley of Alderley

Personal details
- Born: 14 September 1875 London, England
- Died: 22 August 1931 (aged 55) London, England
- Spouse: Margaret Evelyn Stanley (m. 1905)
- Children: Edward Stanley; Pamela Stanley
- Parent: Edward Stanley, 4th Baron Stanley of Alderley (father)
- Relatives: Venetia Stanley (sister); Lowthian Bell (maternal grandfather)
- Education: Eton College
- Alma mater: Balliol College, Oxford
- Military career
- Allegiance: United Kingdom
- Branch: British Army
- Rank: Captain
- Unit: Royal Anglesey Engineers
- Conflicts: Second Boer War

Arthur Lyulph Stanley, 5th Baron Stanley of Alderley, KCMG (14 September 1875 – 22 August 1931), also 5th Baron Sheffield and 4th Baron Eddisbury, was an English nobleman and Governor of Victoria from 1914 to 1920.

== Early life and family ==
Stanley was the second child and first son of Edward Lyulph Stanley, 4th Baron Stanley and Mary Katherine Bell. On 29 August 1905 he married Margaret Evelyn Evans Gordon. They had five children:

- Mary Katherine Adelaide Stanley (30 May 1906 – 1981)
- Edward John Stanley (9 October 1907 – 3 March 1971), the 6th Baron
- Pamela Margaret Stanley (6 September 1909 – 30 June 1991), the actress Pamela Stanley
- Lyulph Henry Victor Owen Stanley (22 October 1915 – 23 June 1971), the 7th Baron
- Victoria Venetia Stanley, the actress "Tordie" Woods (29 June 1917 – 2007)

== Political career ==
Stanley was educated at Eton College and Balliol College, University of Oxford, where obtained a Bachelor of Arts in 1898. In 1902 he was called to the bar at the Inner Temple. In 1904 he became a London County Councillor and in 1906 became Liberal Member of Parliament for Eddisbury in Cheshire near the family seat. Whilst an MP he was Parliamentary Secretary to the Postmaster General serving under Sydney Buxton. His sister, Venetia Stanley, was a close correspondent of the Prime Minister and leader of the Liberal party, H. H. Asquith.

Stanley had been commissioned an officer in the Royal Anglesey Engineers Militia in May 1900, and saw active service in South Africa during the Second Boer War. He was promoted to captain on 6 December 1902.

In 1913 he was serving as High Sheriff of Anglesey when he was appointed Governor of Victoria. He was made a Knight Commander of the Order of St Michael and St George and took up his post on 23 February 1914. He served a five-year term and an additional year until relinquishing the post on 30 January 1920, although he had returned to Britain the previous year due to ill health. In the 1923 General election he stood unsuccessfully as Liberal candidate for Knutsford, losing by 80 votes to Conservative, Sir Ernest Makins. From 1925 to 1928 he was Chairman of the Royal Colonial Institute and of the East Africa Joint Committee.

In 1925 he succeeded his father to the three baronies and was known by the Stanley title. He died in August 1931 of a bacterial infection, actinomycosis. He was succeeded by his son Edward.

In his capacity as former Governor of Victoria, he attended the Covent Garden farewell of the Australian soprano Nellie Melba, and made a speech thanking her for her artistry and war-work. HMV recorded several excerpts of the evening, including Lord Stanley's speech, all of which can be heard on CD today.

== Arms ==
Coat of arms of Arthur Stanley, 5th Baron Stanley of Alderley
Crest On a chapeau gules, turned up ermine, an eagle with wings expanded or preying upon an infant proper, swaddled gules, handed argent. Escutcheon Argent, on a bend azure, three bucks' heads cabossed or, a crescent for difference. Supporters Dexter, a stag or, gorged with a ducal crown, line reflexed over the back, and charged on the shoulder with a mullet azure; sinister, a lion reguardant proper, gorged with a plain collar argent charged with three escallops gules. Motto Sans Changer "Without Changing"

Parliament of the United Kingdom
Preceded by Henry James Tollemache	Member of Parliament for Eddisbury; 1906–1910	Succeeded by Harry Barnston
Government offices
Preceded by Sir John Fuller, 1st Baronet	Governor of Victoria; 1914–1920	Succeeded by Earl of Stradbroke
Peerage of the United Kingdom
Preceded by Edward Stanley	Baron Stanley of Alderley; 1925–1931	Succeeded by Edward Stanley
Preceded by Edward Stanley	Baron Eddisbury; 1925–1931	Succeeded by Edward Stanley
Peerage of Ireland
Preceded by Edward Stanley	Baron Sheffield; 1925–1931	Succeeded by Edward Stanley
