= Henry Stanley, 3rd Baron Stanley of Alderley =

British nobleman and Muslim convert (1827–1903)

The Right Honourable The Lord Stanley of Alderley

Member of the House of Lords Lord Temporal
- In office 16 June 1869 – 11 December 1903; Hereditary Peerage
- Preceded by: The 2nd Baron Stanley of Alderley
- Succeeded by: The 4th Baron Stanley of Alderley

Personal details
- Born: Henry Edward John Stanley; 11 July 1827
- Died: 11 December 1903 (aged 76)

Henry Edward John Stanley, 3rd Baron Stanley of Alderley, 2nd Baron Eddisbury (11 July 1827 – 11 December 1903), also known as Abdul Rahman Stanley, was a British nobleman and historian who translated The first voyage round the world by Magellan and other works from the Age of Discovery. A convert to Islam, in 1869 Lord Stanley became the first Muslim member of the House of Lords.

== Life ==
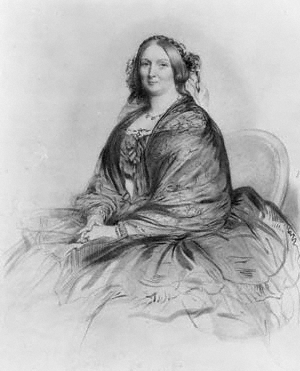
Henrietta Stanley, Baroness Stanley of Alderley, 1860

Stanley was educated at Eton College, and entered Trinity College, Cambridge in 1846.

He entered the Diplomatic Service in 1847, and was appointed Attaché at Constantinople in 1851. In January 1854, he was transferred from Constantinople to be secretary to the legation at Athens.

In or before 1859, Stanley converted to Islam and abandoned his position as a British diplomat in the Ottoman Empire. He may have adopted the name Abdul Rahman. He then travelled under his new Muslim identity as Shaikh Morad to British possessions in Asia, shocking colonial society in Ceylon and Singapore. He was refused a visa to the Dutch East Indies on this voyage. His father, Edward Stanley, 2nd Baron Stanley of Alderley, on reading a press report about these travels complained to his wife about "that wretched fool Henry ... Is he mad or what is he?" He appears to have conducted his Hajj to Mecca.

Lord Stanley was the first Muslim member of the House of Lords, inheriting his titles in 1869 upon the death of his father. When the Dutch invasion of Aceh was in the news in 1873-74, Stanley was a critic of both Dutch and British policy towards Aceh, accusing Britain of betraying Aceh, its ancient ally through treaties of 1601 and 1819, despite having undertaken to protect its independence.

As alcohol is forbidden in Islam, he apparently ordered the closure of all public houses on his estate in Nether Alderley, south of Alderley Edge (then named Chorley). Despite his new faith, he funded the restoration on Anglesey of St Mary's Church, Bodewryd (1867), Llanbadrig Church (1884), St Dona's Church, Llanddona and St Peirio's Church, Rhosbeirio.

He took part in three marriage ceremonies with Fabia, daughter of Santiago Federico San Roman of Seville — firstly in 1862, secondly on 6 November 1869 at the registry office of the parish of St George's, Hanover Square and finally on 15 May 1874 at the Roman Catholic Church of St Alban, Macclesfield. Although she was apparently received as his wife in Britain, Fabia turned out to be identical to Serafina Fernandez y Funes, of Alcaudete, Jaén, Spain, who had, on 30 September 1851 married Ramon Peres y Abril (died 16 May 1870), so that the first two marriage ceremonies were bigamous.

His mother, Henrietta Stanley, Baroness Stanley of Alderley, was an English educationist, while his sister Katharine was the mother of Bertrand Russell. His younger brother Edward Lyulph Stanley succeeded him.

== Death ==
He died and was buried on two of the most auspicious dates in the Muslim calendar, 21 and 25 Ramadan (11 and 15 December 1903 respectively). He was buried according to Muslim rites in unconsecrated ground in the garden of the Dower House on his family's estate, Alderley Park, at Nether Alderley, Cheshire. The chief mourner at his burial was the first secretary to the Ottoman Embassy in London. Islamic prayers were recited over his grave by the embassy's imam. A Janaza service in memory of the deceased was held at the Liverpool Mosque, conducted by Abdullah Quilliam.

In the issue of the Review of Religions for February 1904, the death of Lord Stanley was reported;

"Death of a Muslim member of the House of Lords That the late Henry Edward John Stanley, third Baron Stanley of Alderley, was a sincere and devout Muslim, was known to very few men. Readers of the Safwat-ul-Itbar (Travels of Sheikh Muhammad Bairam Fifth of Tunis), however, knew very well that Lord Stanley had long been a sincere believer in the principles of Islam. But his faith was not limited to a profession by word of mouth. The author of the Safwat-ul-Itbar relates incidents which show how deeply Islam had entered into his heart. He found him not only regular in the five daily prayers, but also constant at tahajjud (the midnight prayers); and what is still more wonderful, he found him very humble in his prayers, and far above most born Muhammadans. When he talked of the Holy Prophet, it was with profound love and deep respect that he mentioned or named him. He found him also very well versed on the principles of Muslim theology, and in his conversation with him he found that the deep conviction of his mind was the result of a comprehensive knowledge of the principles of Islam. This was about the year 1880. Who could imagine that such a sincere and devout worshipper of the true God was living in the heart of Christendom?"

The Crescent gave the following account of his interment;

"On Tuesday, the 25th Ramadan (15th December) his mortal remains were laid silently to rest in a secluded plantation in Alderley Park, his late lordship's ancestral home. The interment took place at an early hour, and was conducted strictly according to Muslim usage, in which Holy and Imperishable Faith his lordship lived and died (Alhamd-o-lillah!) The corpse was inclosed in a plain deal coffin, and borne from the hall by workmen on the Alderley estate. Following it on foot were the successor to the title (the Hon’ble Lyulph Stanley), his wife, their two sons, and other relatives. By the late Lord Stanley's special direction there was also present as chief mourner his Excellency Hamid Bey, Premier Secretaire to the Ottoman Embassy in London. The Islamic prayers were recited over the grave by the Imam to the Turkish Embassy. A Janaza service in memory of the deceased was held at the Liverpool Mosque, and was conducted by His Honour Abdulla Quilliam Effendi, Sheikh-ul Islam of the British Isles."

According to Nancy Mitford, at the funeral, his brother turned to the new Lord Stanley, who had removed his hat out of respect, and snapped "Not your hat, you fool, your boots."

== Arms ==
Coat of arms of Henry Stanley, 3rd Baron Stanley of Alderley
Crest On a chapeau gules, turned up ermine, an eagle with wings expanded or preying upon an infant proper, swaddled gules, handed argent. Escutcheon Argent, on a bend azure, three bucks' heads cabossed or, a crescent for difference. Supporters Dexter, a stag or, gorged with a ducal crown, line reflexed over the back, and charged on the shoulder with a mullet azure; sinister, a lion reguardant proper, gorged with a plain collar argent charged with three escallops gules. Motto Sans Changer "Without Changing"

== Books ==
His books were published by the Hakluyt Society, of which he was a member and vice-president. He wrote under the name Hon. Henry E. J. Stanley while his father was alive and Lord Stanley of Alderley after he acceded to that title.

- 1866/1995/2001: A description of the Coasts of East Africa and Malabar in the beginning of the sixteenth century by Duarte Barbosa, a Portuguese, translator
- 1868/1964/2001: The Philippine Islands, Moluccas, Siam, Cambodia, Japan, and China, at the close of the sixteenth century. by Antonio de Morga, translator
- 1869/1963: The Three Voyages of Vasco da Gama, and His Viceroyalty from the Lendas da India of Gaspar Correa, translator
- 1873/1963: Travels to Tana and Persia by Josafa Barbaro and Ambrosio Contarini, editor
- 1874/1963/2001: The First Voyage Round the World, by Magellan translator
- 1881/1970: Narrative of the Portuguese embassy to Abyssinia during the years 1520-1527 by Father Francisco Alvarez translator and editor; republished 1961 as The Prester John of The Indies - A True Relation of The Lands of The Prester John, the narrative of the Portuguese Embassy to Ethiopia in 1520 by Father Francisco Alvares

Peerage of the United Kingdom
Preceded by Edward Stanley	Baron Stanley of Alderley; Baron Eddisbury; 1869–1903	Succeeded by Edward Stanley
