= Constantine Phipps, 3rd Marquess of Normanby =

British hereditary peer

Constantine Charles Henry Phipps, 3rd Marquess of Normanby DL (29 August 1846 – 25 August 1932) was a British hereditary peer and Church of England clergyman who was a Canon of Windsor from 1891 to 1907.

== Early life and education ==
Normanby was born on 29 August 1846, the eldest son of George Phipps, 2nd Marquess of Normanby and his wife Laura Russell. He was educated at the University of Durham from which he received an MA.

On the death of his father on 3 April 1890, he succeeded to the Marquessate of Normanby and other titles, having previously been styled Earl of Mulgrave.

== Ecclesiastical career ==
Normanby was ordained by William Thompson, Archbishop of York in 1870. He held the following positions:

- Assistant curate at Lythe, 1871
- Vicar of Worsley with Ellenbrook Chapel, Lancashire, 1872 – 1890
- Commissary for the Anglican Diocese of New Westminster, 1879 – 1897
- Chaplain to All Saints’ Church, San Remo, Italy, 1884 – 1893
- Chaplain to the Archbishop of York, 1891 – 1897
- Chaplain to York Lay Readers, 1910

He was appointed Canon of the ninth stall in St George's Chapel, Windsor Castle in 1891, a position he held until he resigned in 1907.

== Other posts ==
In addition to his ecclesiastical positions, Lord Normanby was also Lieutenant-Colonel of the North Riding Volunteer Regiment.

== Marriage and children ==
On 30 December 1903, Normanby married Gertrude Stansfeld Foster OBE DGStJ, daughter of Johnston Jonas Foster. They had three children:

- Lady Katharine Mary Phipps (7 January 1905 – 1960), married Roy Amon Harding.
- Lady (Gertrude) Elizabeth Phipps (30 April 1908 – 1985), married Admiral Sir William Davis.
- Oswald Constantine John Phipps, 4th Marquess of Normanby (29 July 1912 – 30 January 1994)

== Death ==
Lord Normanby died in 1932 at the age of 85 and was succeeded in the marquessate and other titles by his son Oswald. His widow, the Dowager Marchioness of Normanby died on 12 March 1948.

== Notes ==
Peerage of the United Kingdom
| Preceded by George Augustus Constantine Phipps | Marquess of Normanby; 1890–1932 | Succeeded by Oswald Constantine John Phipps |
