= Edward Stanley, 2nd Baron Stanley of Alderley =

British politician (1802–1869)

The Right Honourable The Lord Stanley of Alderley PC
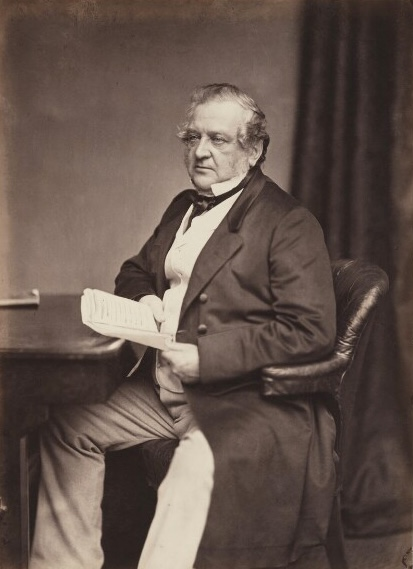
- The 2nd Baron of Alderley, c. 1865
Ministerial offices
Postmaster General
In office 17 August 1860 – 26 June 1866
Prime Minister	The Viscount Palmerston; The Earl Russell
Preceded by	The Earl of Elgin
Succeeded by	The Duke of Montrose
President of the Board of Trade
In office 31 March 1855 – 21 February 1858
Prime Minister	The Viscount Palmerston
Preceded by	Edward Cardwell
Succeeded by	Joseph Warner Henley
Paymaster General Vice-President of the Board of Trade
In office 5 January 1853 – 30 January 1855
Prime Minister	The Earl of Aberdeen
Preceded by	Charles Abbot
Succeeded by	Edward Pleydell-Bouverie
In office 12 February 1852 – 21 February 1852
Prime Minister	The Earl Russell
Preceded by	Granville Leveson-Gower
Succeeded by	Charles Abbot
Parliamentary Under-Secretary of State for Foreign Affairs
In office 6 July 1846 – 12 February 1852
Prime Minister	The Earl Russell
Preceded by	George Smythe
Succeeded by	Austen Henry Layard
Paymaster General
In office 19 June 1841 – 30 August 1841
Prime Minister	The Viscount Melbourne
Preceded by	Sir Henry Parnell, Bt.
Succeeded by	Sir Edward Knatchbull, Bt.
Parliamentary Secretary to the Treasury
In office 21 April 1835 – 19 June 1841
Prime Minister	The Viscount Melbourne
Preceded by	Sir George Clerk
Succeeded by	Sir Denis Le Marchant
Parliamentary offices
Member of Parliament for North Cheshire
In office 26 August 1847 – 8 June 1848
Preceded by	George Legh
Succeeded by	George Legh
In office 8 January 1833 – 22 July 1841
Preceded by	constituency established
Succeeded by	George Legh
Member of Parliament for Hindon
In office 1 June 1831 – 8 January 1833
Preceded by	George Matthew Fortescue
Succeeded by	constituency abolished

Personal details
- Born: 13 November 1802
- Died: 16 June 1869 (aged 66)
- Party: Whig; Liberal
- Spouse: Henrietta Dillon-Lee (m. 1826)
- Children: 10
- Parent(s): John Stanley, 1st Baron Stanley of Alderley; Lady Maria Holroyd
- Education: Eton College
- Alma mater: Christ Church, Oxford

Edward John Stanley, 2nd Baron Stanley of Alderley, PC (13 November 1802 – 16 June 1869), known as The Lord Eddisbury between 1848 and 1850, was a British politician. He served as Postmaster General between 1860 and 1866.

== Early life and education ==
Stanley was the eldest of twin sons born to John Stanley, 1st Baron Stanley of Alderley, and Lady Maria Josepha, daughter of John Holroyd, 1st Earl of Sheffield. His twin brother, Hon. William Owen Stanley (1802–1884), was a Liberal Party politician. He was educated at Eton College and Christ Church, Oxford.

== Political career ==
Stanley entered the House of Commons as Whig Member of Parliament (MP) for Hindon in 1831 and was later member for North Cheshire between 1832 and 1841, and between 1847 and 1848. He served under Lord Melbourne as Patronage Secretary to the Treasury from 1835 to 1841, as Under-Secretary of State for the Home Department in 1841 and as Paymaster General in 1841 and under Lord John Russell as Under-Secretary of State for Foreign Affairs between 1846 and 1852. He was sworn of the Privy Council in 1841 and in 1848, two years before he succeeded to the barony of Stanley, he was created Baron Eddisbury, of Winnington in the County Palatine of Chester.

Stanley was President of the Board of Trade under Lord Palmerston from 1855 to 1858, and Postmaster-General under Palmerston and then Lord John Russell from 1860 to 1866. In 1861 he established the Post Office Savings Bank.

== Marriage and issue ==
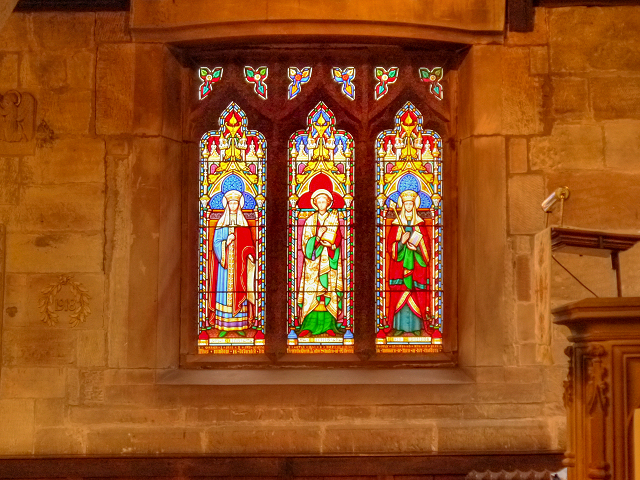
Stained glass window at St Mary's Church, Nether Alderley in memory of Lord and Lady Stanley's daughters Margaret Olga, Cecilia, and Mary Ethelfreda Stanley, who died young

Lord Stanley of Alderley married Henrietta Maria (21 December 1807 – 16 February 1895), a daughter of Viscount Dillon, in 1826. Lord and Lady Stanley of Alderley had 12 children:

- Henry Edward John, 3rd Baron Stanley of Alderley (1827–1903)
- Hon. Alice Margaret (20 August 1828 – 19 May 1910), married Augustus Pitt Rivers
- Hon. Henrietta Blanche (3 July 1830 – 5 January 1921), later Countess of Airlie, wife of David Ogilvy, 10th Earl of Airlie (1826–81); a grandmother of Clementine Churchill, and a great-grandmother of the Mitford sisters
- Cecilia (3 July 1831 – 22 September 1839), died from head injury after falling from a window in Gosport, Hampshire
- Hon. Maude Alethea (1833–1915), activist for women and children
- Margaret Olga Stanley (1 March 1835 – 27 January 1836), died in infancy
- Lt. Col. Hon. John Constantine (30 September 1836 – 23 April 1878), Grenadier Guards
- Edward Lyulph Stanley, 4th Baron Stanley of Alderley (1839–1925)
- Hon. Katherine Louisa (1842–1874), later Viscountess Amberley, wife of John Russell, Viscount Amberley; mother of the philosopher Bertrand Russell
- Rt. Rev. Hon. Algernon Charles (16 September 1843 – 23 April 1928), Roman Catholic Bishop of Emmaus (in partibus)
- Rosalind Frances (1845–1921), later Countess of Carlisle, became the chatelaine of Castle Howard and a radical temperance campaigner.
- Hon. Mary Ethelfreda Stanley (25 July 1849 – 15 September 1849), died in infancy

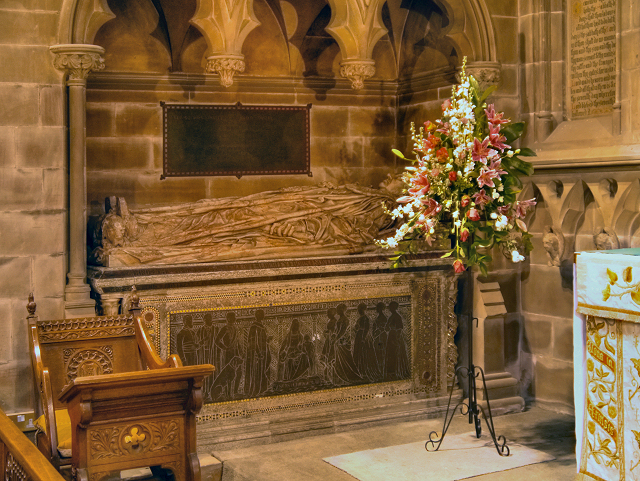
Lord Stanley's tomb at St Mary's, with a brass plaque featuring an engraving of his wife and their 12 children

Three of their daughters died young. A stained glass window in their memories was erected in 1860 at St Mary's Church, Nether Alderley.

Lord Stanley of Alderley died in June 1869, aged 66, and was succeeded by his eldest son, Henry. Lady Stanley of Alderley died in February 1895, aged 87.

In the 1930s his family's letters were published by his descendant Nancy Mitford as:

- The Ladies of Alderley: Letters 1841–1850 (Hamish Hamilton, 1938)
- The Stanleys of Alderley: Their letters 1851–1865 (Chapman & Hall, 1939)

== Arms ==
Coat of arms of Edward Stanley, 2nd Baron Stanley of Alderley
Crest On a chapeau gules, turned up ermine, an eagle with wings expanded or preying upon an infant proper, swaddled gules, handed argent. Escutcheon Argent, on a bend azure, three bucks' heads cabossed or, a crescent for difference. Supporters Dexter, a stag or, gorged with a ducal crown, line reflexed over the back, and charged on the shoulder with a mullet azure; sinister, a lion reguardant proper, gorged with a plain collar argent charged with three escallops gules. Motto Sans Changer (Without Changing)

Parliament of the United Kingdom
Preceded by George Fortescue; John Weyland	Member of Parliament for Hindon; 1831–1832; With: John Weyland	Constituency abolished
New constituency	Member of Parliament for North Cheshire; 1832–1841; With: William Egerton	Succeeded by William Tatton Egerton; George Legh
Preceded by William Egerton; George Legh	Member of Parliament for North Cheshire; 1847–1848; With: William Egerton	Succeeded by William Egerton; George Legh
Political offices
Preceded by Viscount Howick	Under-Secretary of State for the Home Department; 1834	Succeeded by William Gregson
Preceded by Sir George Clerk, Bt	Parliamentary Secretary to the Treasury; 1835–1841	Succeeded by Sir Denis Le Marchant, Bt
Preceded by Sir Henry Parnell, Bt	Paymaster General; 1841	Succeeded by Sir Edward Knatchbull, Bt
Preceded by George Smythe	Under-Secretary of State for Foreign Affairs; 1846–1852	Succeeded by Austen Henry Layard
Preceded by The Earl Granville	Paymaster General; Vice-President of the Board of Trade; 1852	Succeeded by The Lord Colchester
Preceded by The Lord Colchester	Paymaster General; Vice-President of the Board of Trade; 1853–1855	Succeeded by Edward Pleydell Bouverie
Preceded by Edward Cardwell	President of the Board of Trade; 1855–1858	Succeeded by Joseph Warner Henley
Preceded by The Earl of Elgin	Postmaster General; 1860–1866	Succeeded by The Duke of Montrose
Peerage of the United Kingdom
New creation	Baron Eddisbury; 1848–1869	Succeeded by Henry Stanley
Preceded by John Stanley	Baron Stanley of Alderley; 1850–1869	Succeeded by Henry Stanley
