= Chernock =

Chernock is a family name. Notable people with it include:

- Arianne Chernock (born 1975), American historian
- Beatrice Chernock (1908–1994), American educator and politician
- Sir Boteler Chernock, 4th Baronet (1696–1756), English politician
- Pynsent Chernock (1670–1734), English politician and landowner

== See also ==
- Chernock baronets
