= William Gostwick =

William Gostwick may refer to:

- Sir William Gostwick, 1st Baronet (1565–1615), of the Gostwick baronets
- Sir William Gostwick, 4th Baronet (1650–1720), of the Gostwick baronets, MP for Bedfordshire
- Sir William Gostwick, 5th Baronet (d. 1766), of the Gostwick baronets

== See also ==
- Gostwick (surname)
