= Edmund Sheffield =

Edmund Sheffield may refer to:

- Edmund Sheffield (MP for Aldborough) (c.1566–1615), MP for Aldborough, 1604
- Edmund Sheffield, 2nd Duke of Buckingham and Normanby (1716–1735), English nobleman
- Edmund Sheffield, 1st Earl of Mulgrave (c. 1564–1646), British peer and Member of Parliament
- Edmund Sheffield, 2nd Earl of Mulgrave (1611–1658), English peer
- Edmund Sheffield, 1st Baron Sheffield (1521–1549), English nobleman
