= Lord Edward Russell (1642–1714) =

English politician

Member of Parliament for Bedfordshire
- In office 1689-1705; 1708–1713

Treasurer of the Chamber
- In office 1694–1702

Member of Parliament for Tavistock
- In office 1679–1683; 1701-1702

Personal details
- Born: 1643
- Died: 30 June 1714 (aged 70–71)
- Spouse: Francis Lloyd (m. 1688)
- Parent: William Russell (father)
- Relatives: William Russell (brother)
- Education: University of Padua

Lord Edward Russell (1643 – 30 June 1714) was an English politician, known as Hon. Edward Russell until 1694. He married Francis Lloyd, a widow, in 1688. They had no children.

Edward Russell was son of William Russell, 1st Duke of Bedford (1616–1700). Edward was educated privately and at the University of Padua. At the time of the 1st Duke's death, Edward was the oldest surviving son, but the dukedom passed instead to Edward's nephew, the young Wriothesley Russell, 2nd Duke of Bedford. This was because Wriothesley was the son of Edward's elder brother William Russell, Lord Russell.

Edward Russell represented Tavistock in Parliament from 13 February 1679 to 23 March 1683. Russell was appointed Custos Rotulorum of Caernarvonshire in 1689 at the Glorious Revolution, and was Treasurer of the Chamber from 1694 to 1702. He was briefly the Lord Lieutenant of Bedfordshire, Lord Lieutenant of Cambridgeshire, Lord Lieutenant of Middlesex, and Custos Rotulorum of Middlesex from 1700 until 1701, when his nephew Wriothesley Russell, 2nd Duke of Bedford reached his majority and assumed those offices.

Parliament of England
Preceded by Lord Russell; Sir Francis Drake	Member of Parliament for Tavistock; 1679–1683; With: Sir Francis Drake	Succeeded by Sir James Butler; John Beare
Preceded by Sir Villiers Chernock; William Boteler	Member of Parliament for Bedfordshire; 1689–1705; With: William Duncombe 1689–1690, 1695–1698; Thomas Browne 1690–1695; Sir William Gostwick 1698–1705	Succeeded by Sir William Gostwick; Sir Pynsent Chernock
Preceded by Lord Robert Russell; Sir Francis Drake	Member of Parliament for Tavistock; 1701–1702; With: Lord Robert Russell	Succeeded by Lord Robert Russell; Lord James Russell
Parliament of Great Britain
Preceded by Sir William Gostwick; Sir Pynsent Chernock	Member of Parliament for Bedfordshire; 1708–1713; With: Sir William Gostwick	Succeeded by Sir Pynsent Chernock; John Harvey
Court offices
Vacant Title last held by Sir Rowland Gwynne	Treasurer of the Chamber; 1694–1702	Succeeded by The Viscount Fitzhardinge
Honorary titles
Preceded by The Viscount Bulkeley	Custos Rotulorum of Caernarvonshire; 1689–1714	Succeeded by Lord Willoughby de Eresby
Preceded by The 1st Duke of Bedford	Lord Lieutenant of Bedfordshire, Cambridgeshire and Middlesex; 1700–1701	Succeeded by The 2nd Duke of Bedford
Preceded by The 1st Duke of Bedford	Custos Rotulorum of Middlesex; 1700–1701	Succeeded by The 2nd Duke of Bedford
