= Normanby Hall =

Grade I listed historic house in North Lincolnshire, England

Coordinates: 53°38′16″N 0°39′35″W

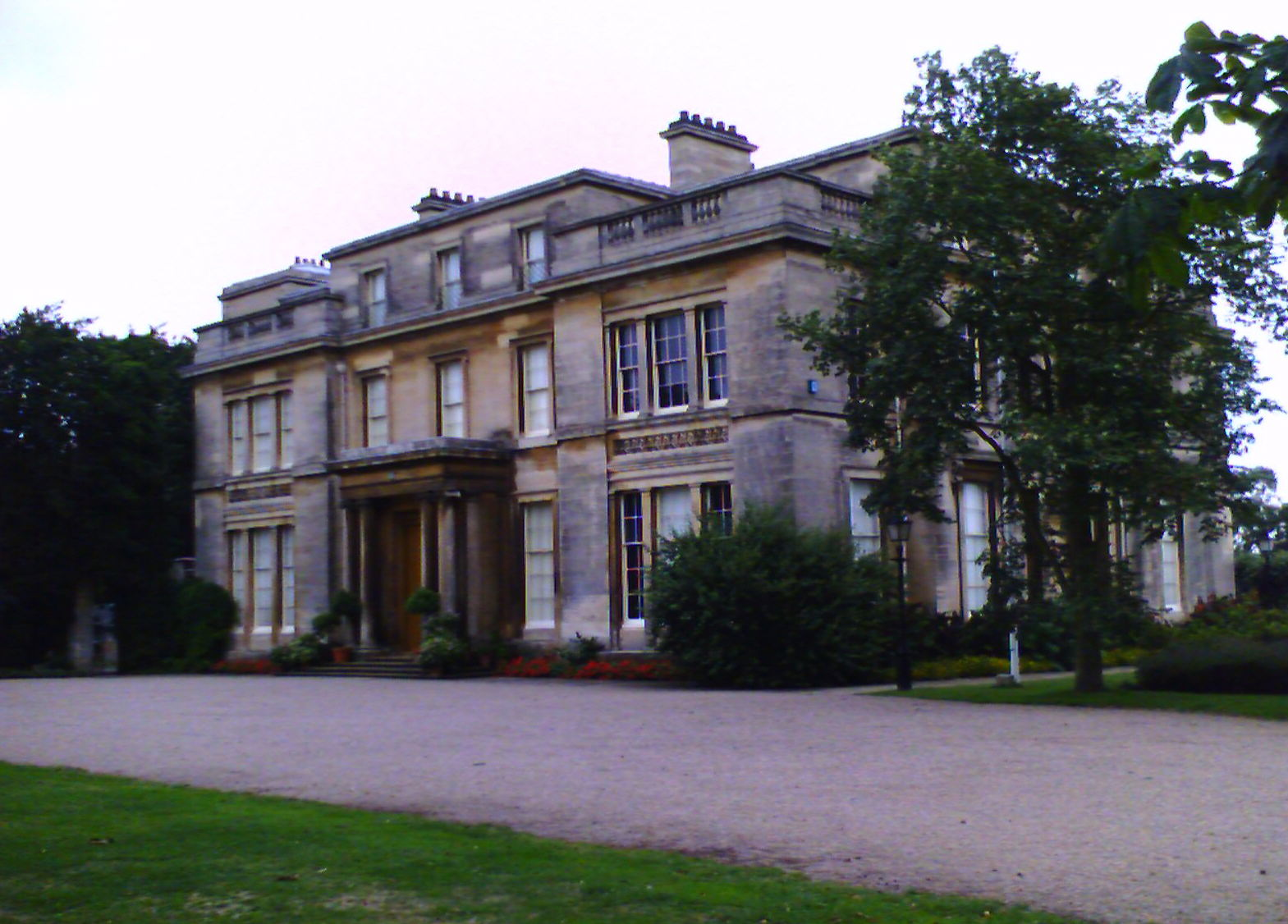
Normanby Hall

Normanby Hall is a classic English mansion, located near the village of Burton-upon-Stather, 5 miles (8 km) north of Scunthorpe, North Lincolnshire.

== History ==
The present hall was built in 1825–30 to the designs of Robert Smirke for Sir Robert Sheffield (1786–1862). The Sheffield family had lived on the site since 1539, and the family's titles include Dukes of Buckingham and Normanby and Sheffield baronets. It replaced a previous 17th-century building.

John Sheffield became Duke of Buckingham and Normanby in 1703. He built a fine mansion in London called Buckingham House. His son, the second Duke sold the house to George III and it is now known as Buckingham Palace.

The house was extended and altered to designs by Walter Brierley between 1906 and 1908.

The Sheffield family moved out of Normanby Hall in 1963. The hall is now in the care of the North Lincolnshire Council. The former 350 acre (1.4 km^{2}) estate around the hall is now a country park. Within it, there are a restored working Victorian walled garden, a farming museum, duck ponds, a deer sanctuary, a fishing lake, a miniature railway and a stableyard with the life-size Horse and Rider sculpture by Harold Gosney.

Samantha Cameron, wife of the former Conservative prime minister, David Cameron, and elder daughter of the eighth Baronet, grew up on the estate.

Normanby Hall is also home to the "Party in the Park" music festival, which takes place over the weekend in July, and has featured bands such as Toploader, tribute acts covering Little Mix and Gary Barlow, and local bands such as The Dirty Pitchers, who cover Britpop hits.

== Tourism and sport ==
Normanby Hall Country Park is a tourist attraction operated by North Lincolnshire Council and includes several activities for children and families. An adjacent council-operated par 72 golf course shares the Normanby Hall Name.

== Image gallery ==
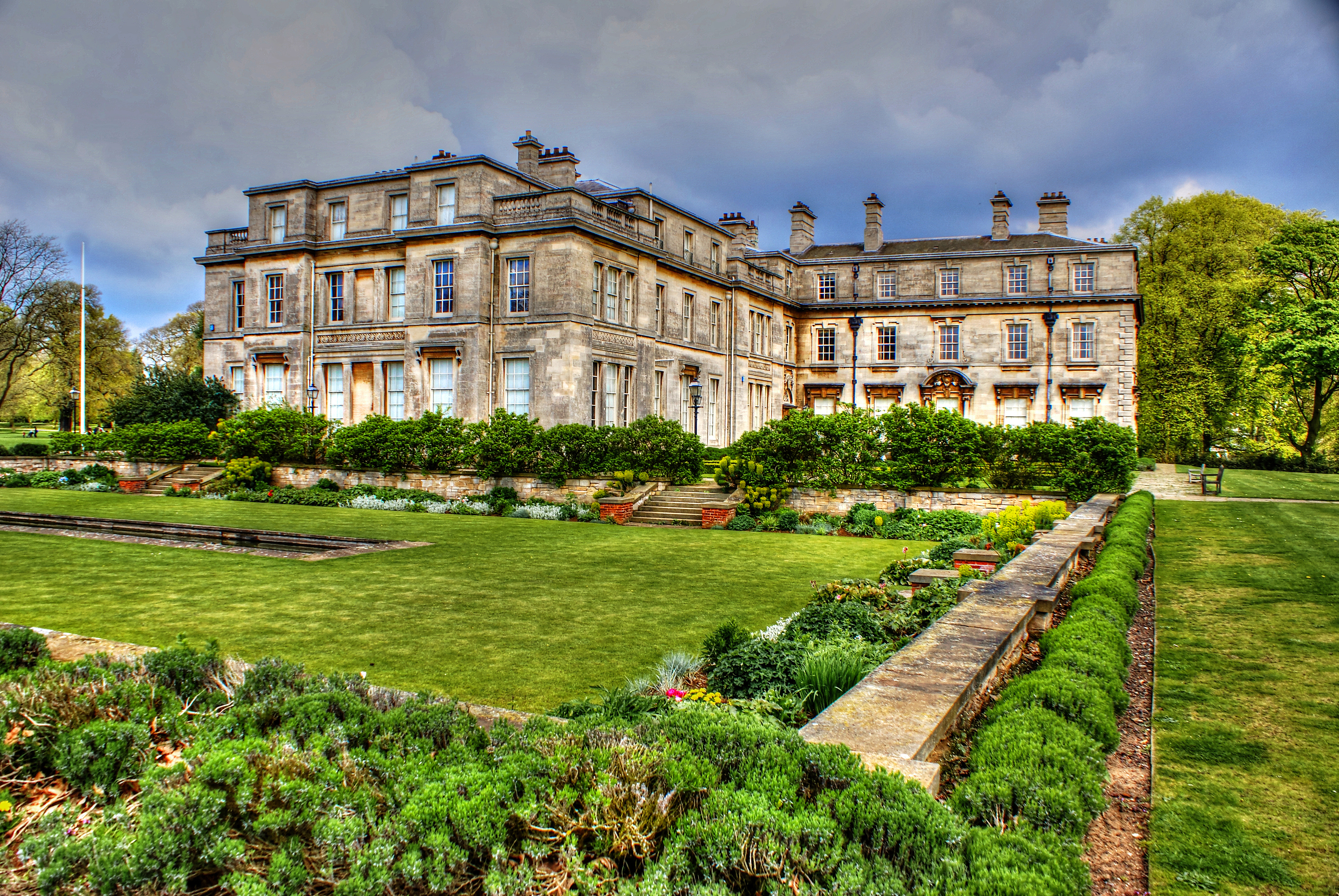
The hall and ornamental pond

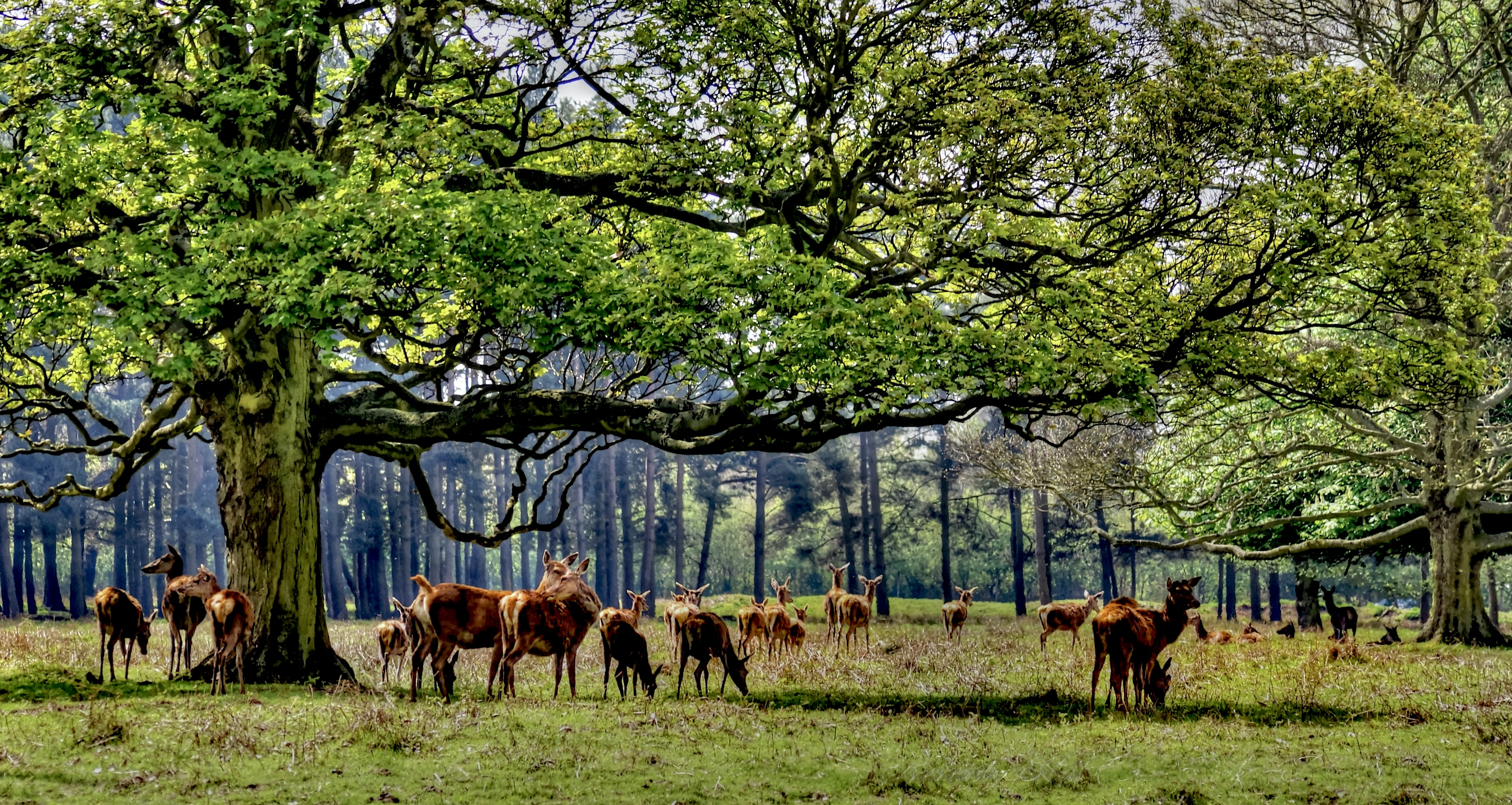
Deer park

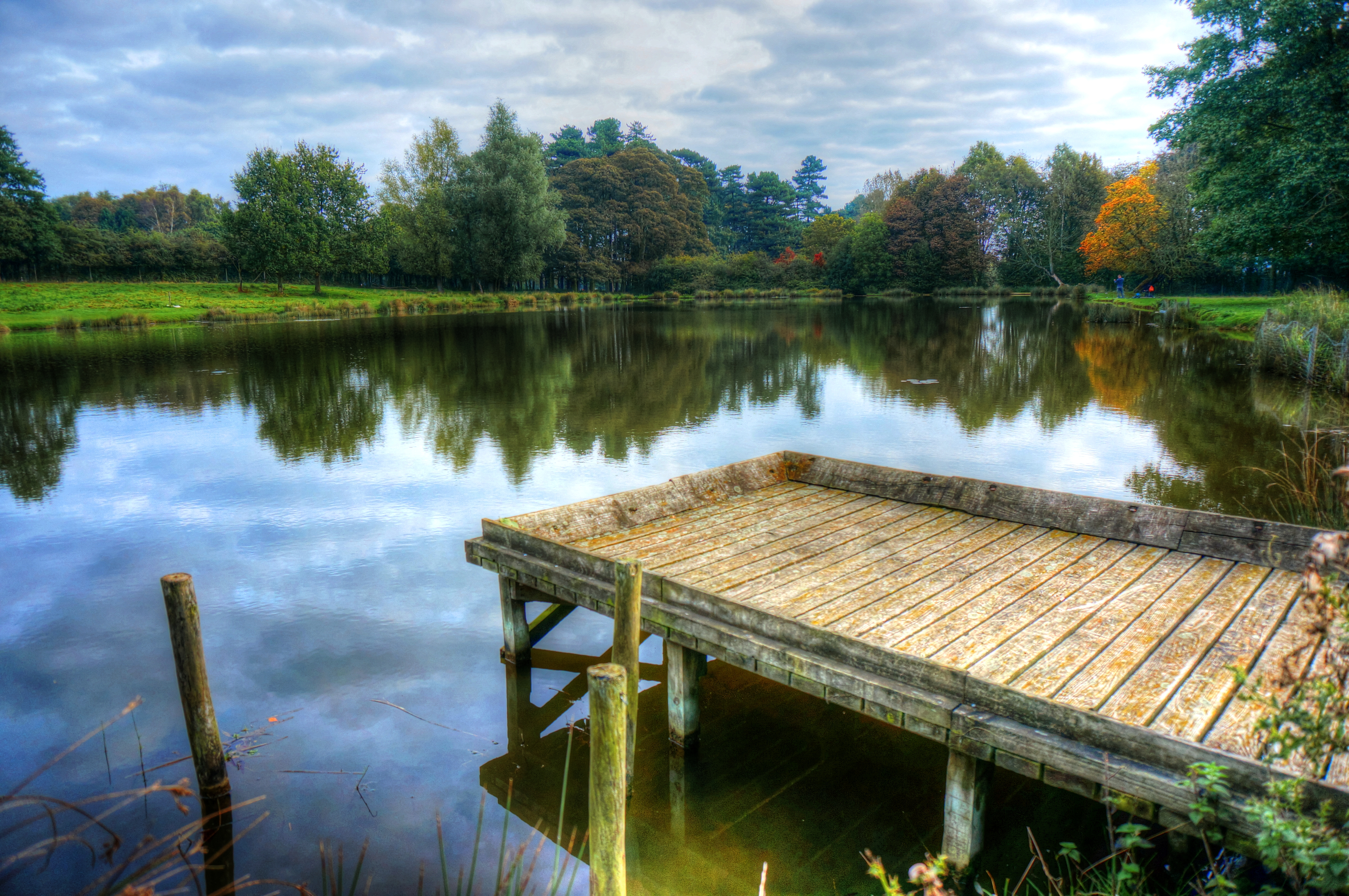
Normanby Hall fishing pond

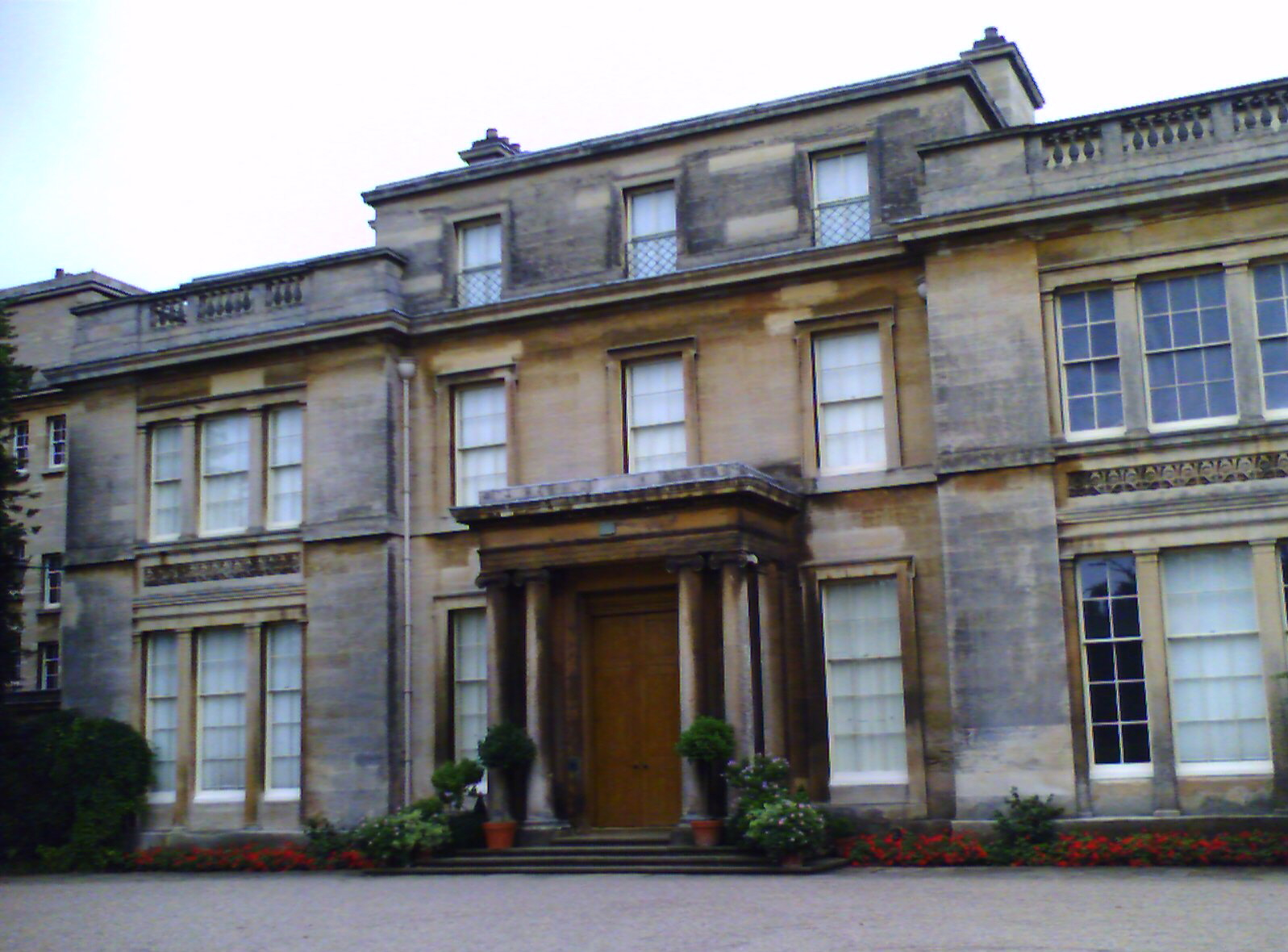
Hall front entrance

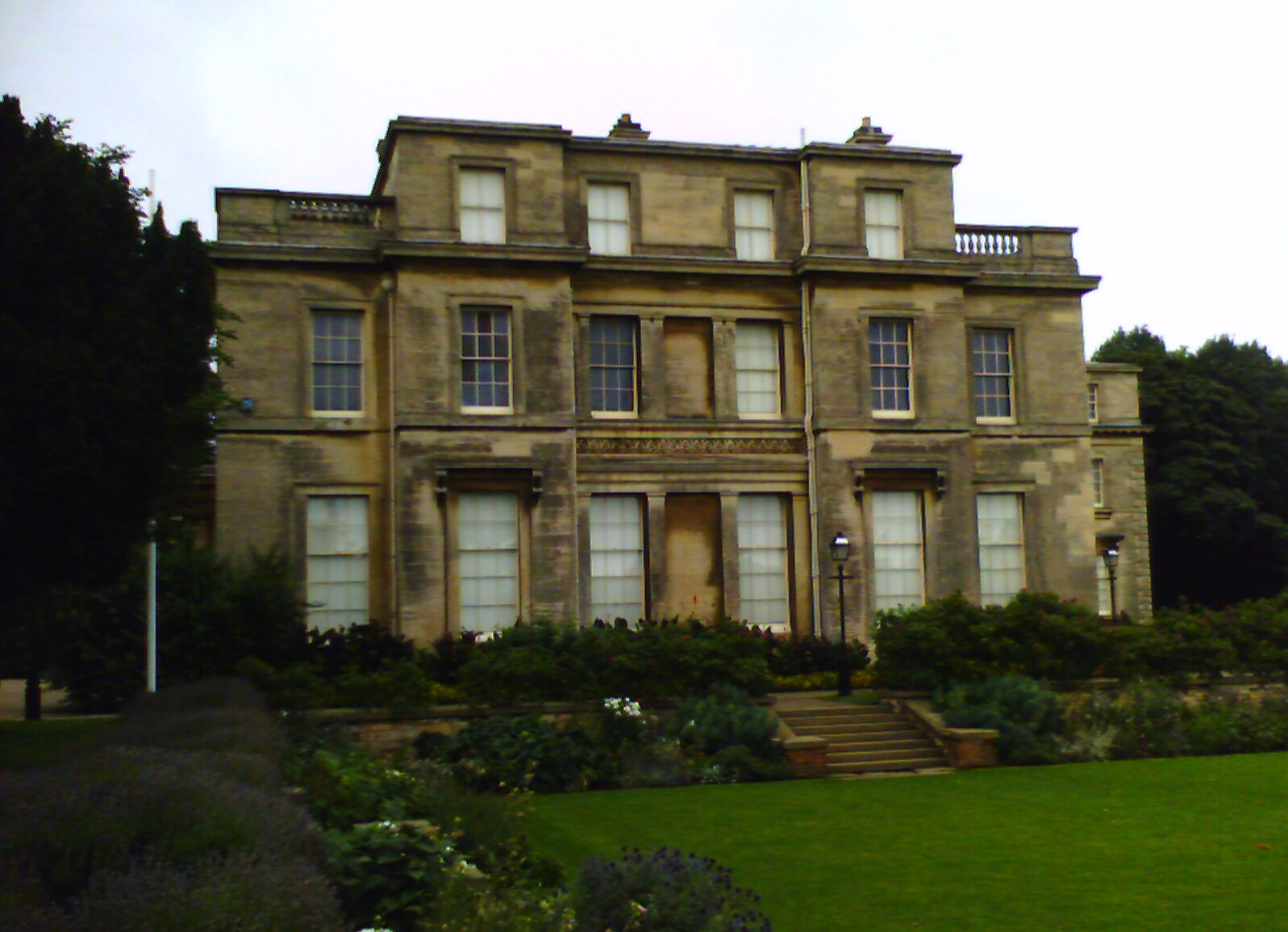
Hall side view

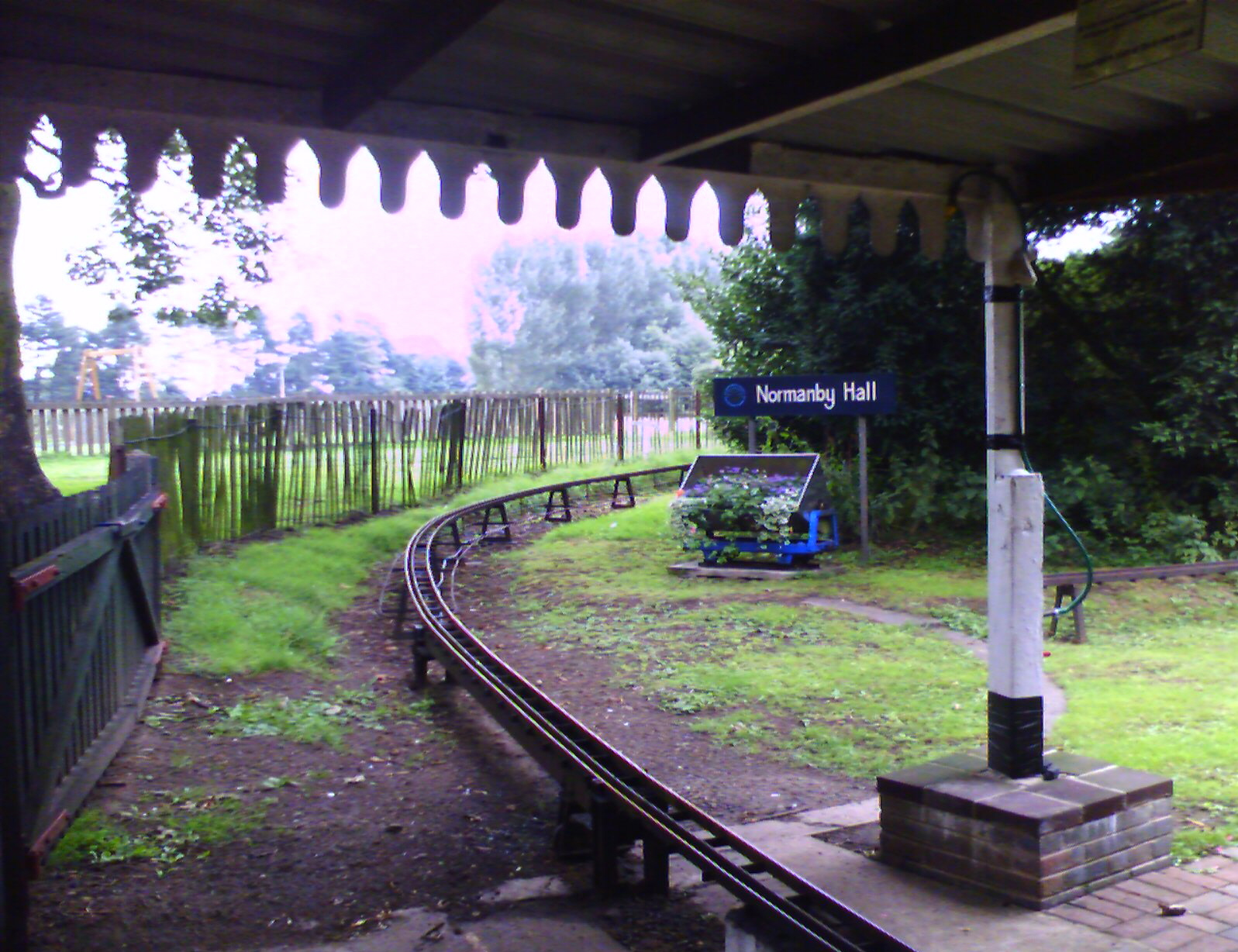
Miniature railway station

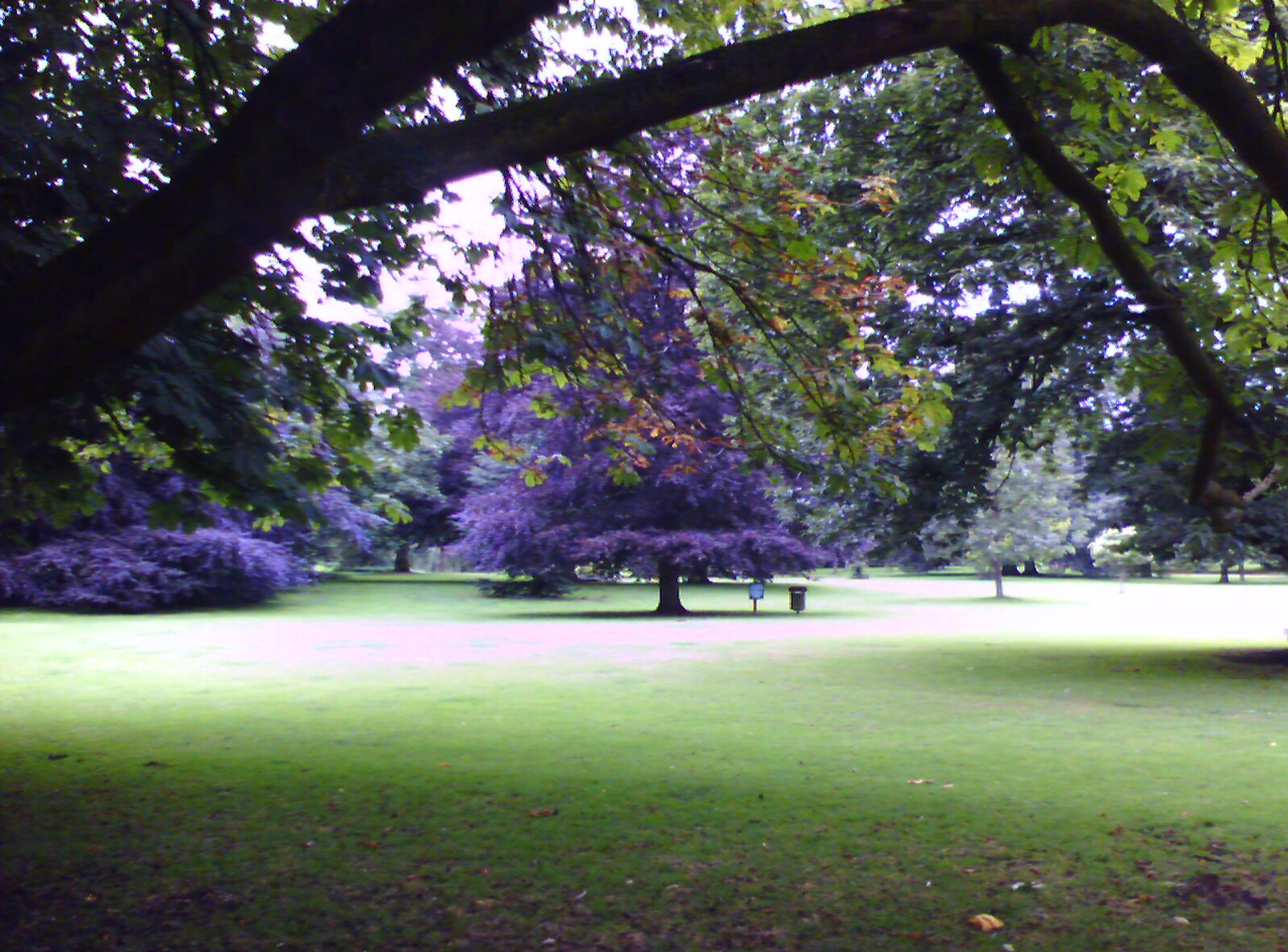
Country park broadleaf woodlands

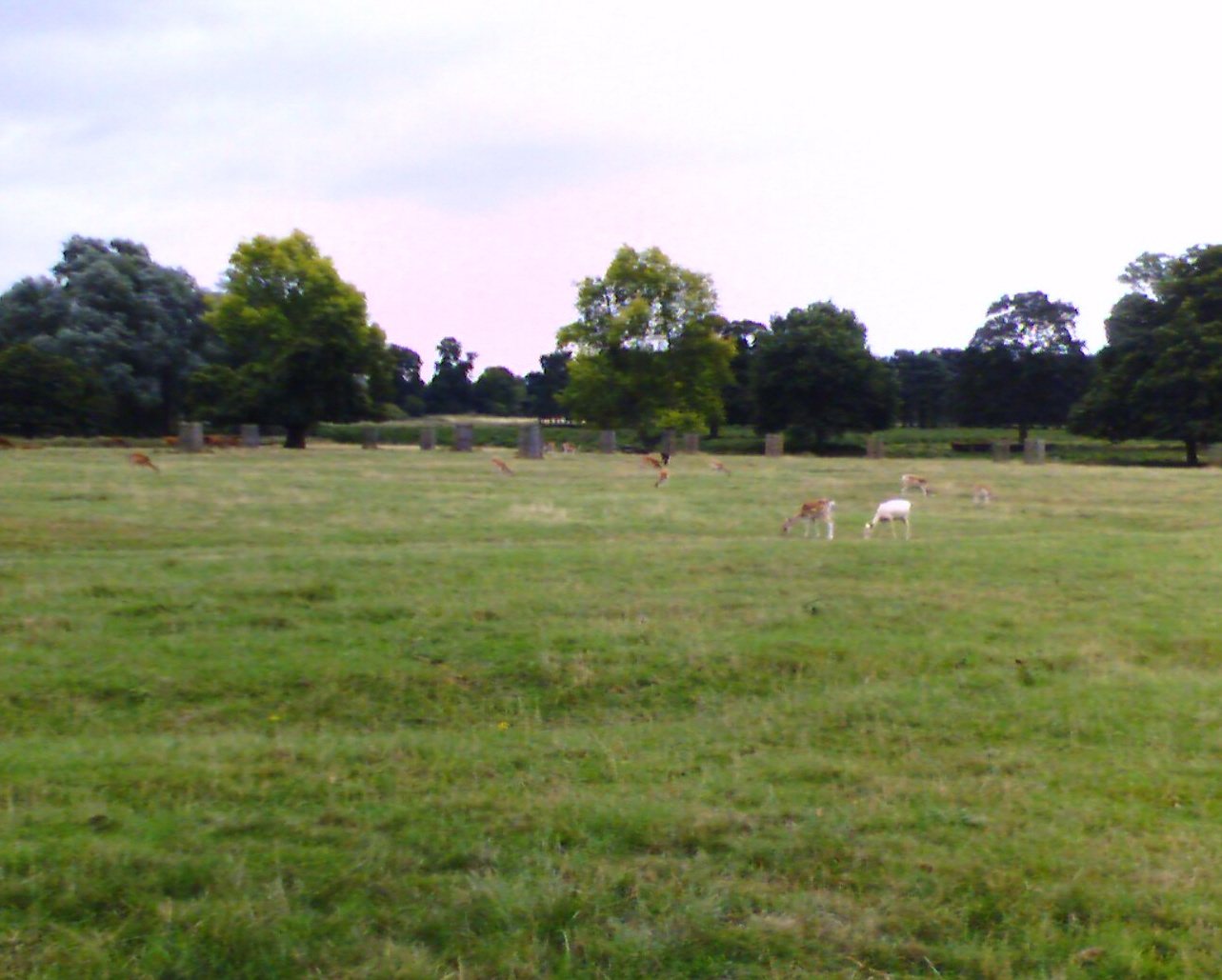
Deer sanctuary

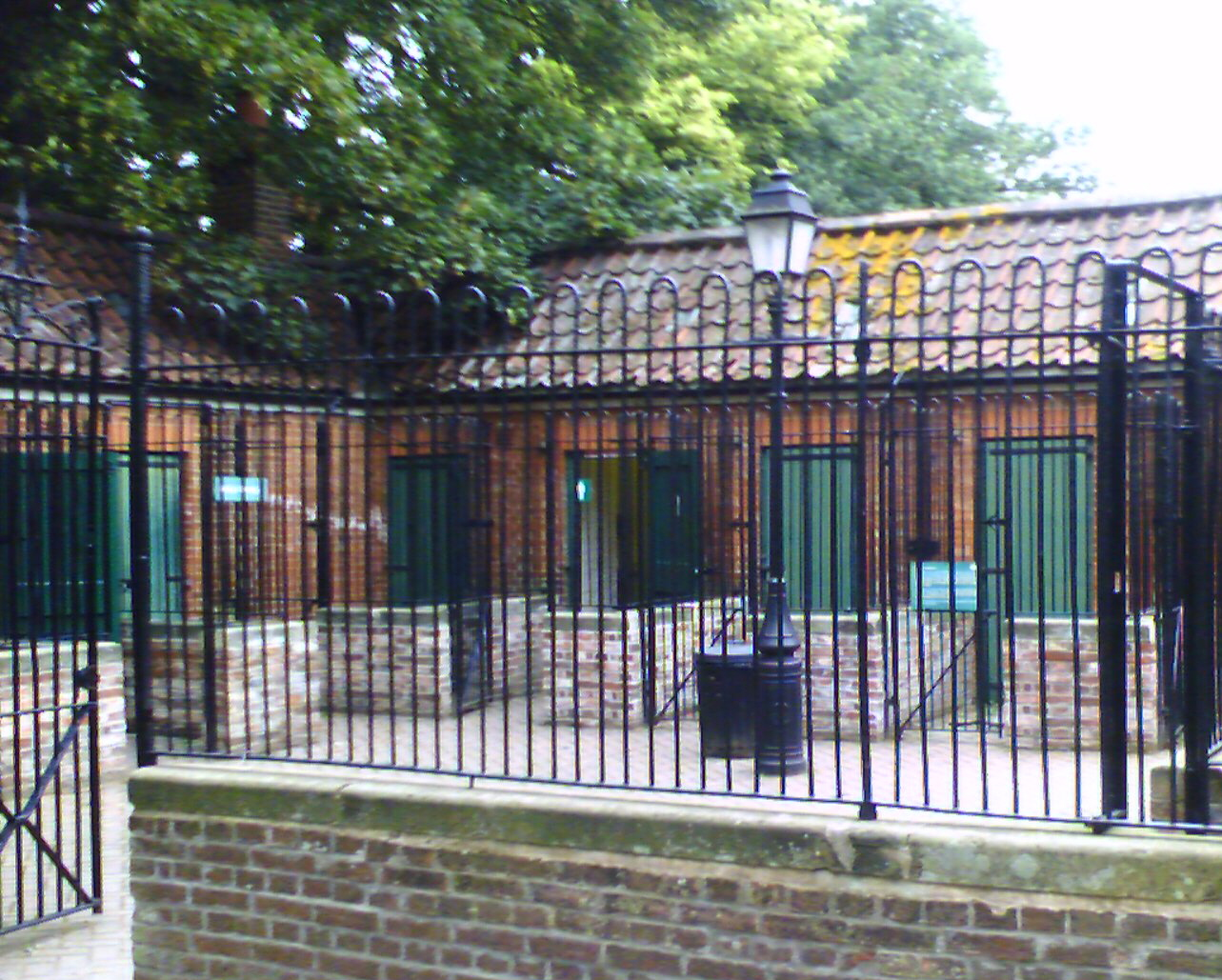
Old kennels
