= 2nd Duke of Buckingham =

2nd Duke of Buckingham may refer to:

- Henry Stafford, 2nd Duke of Buckingham (1455–1483), English peer
- George Villiers, 2nd Duke of Buckingham (1628–1687), English statesman and poet
- Edmund Sheffield, 2nd Duke of Buckingham and Normanby (1716–1735), English peer
- Richard Temple-Nugent-Brydges-Chandos-Grenville, 2nd Duke of Buckingham and Chandos (1797–1861), British politician and military officer
