= Duke of Buckingham and Normanby =

Hereditary British Title

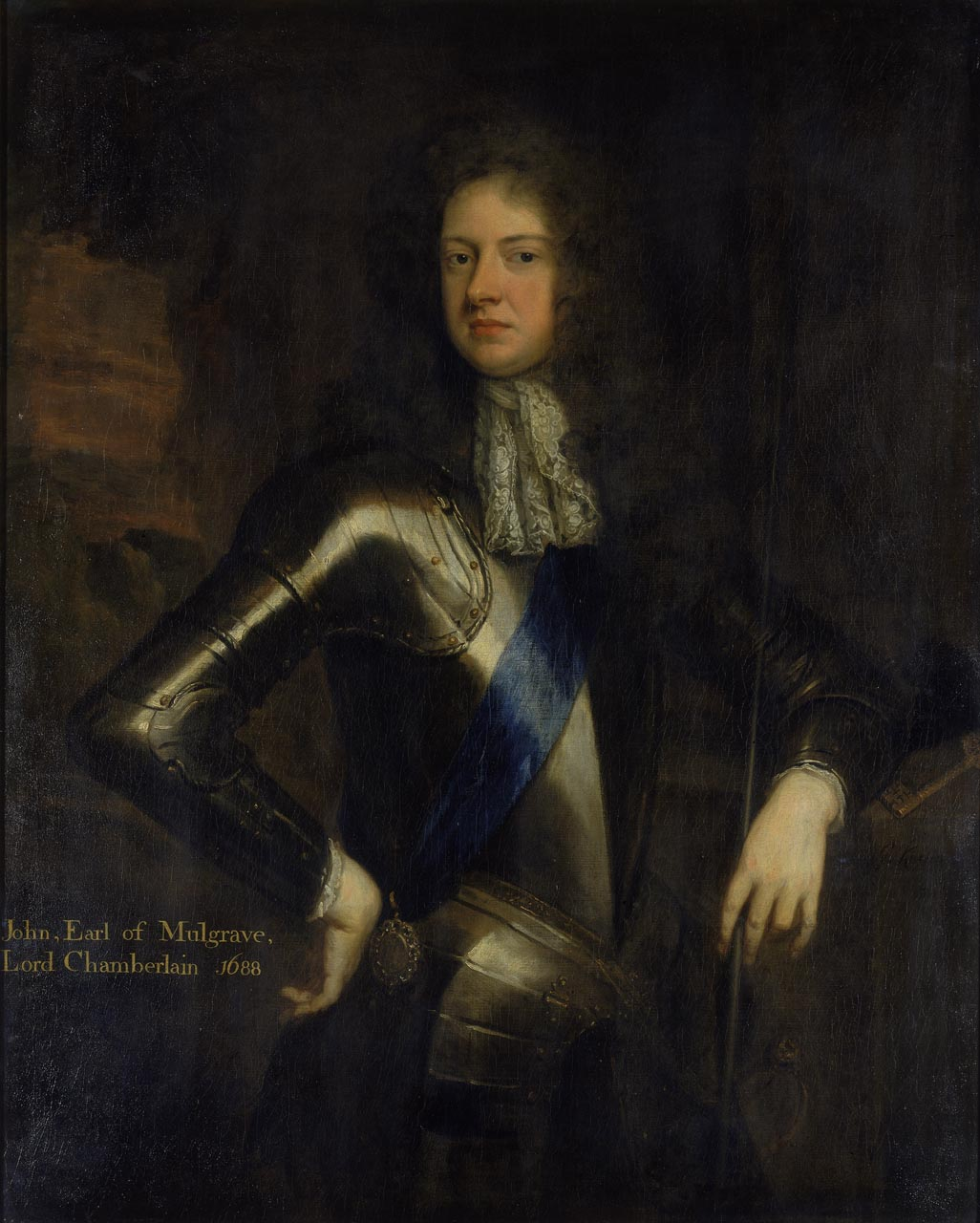
John Sheffield, 1st Duke of Buckingham and Normanby

Duke of Buckingham and Normanby was a title in the Peerage of England. The full title was Duke of the County of Buckingham and of Normanby but in practice only Duke of Buckingham and Normanby was used. The dukedom was created in 1703 for John Sheffield, 1st Marquess of Normanby KG, a notable Tory politician of the late Stuart period, who served under Queen Anne as Lord Privy Seal and Lord President of the Council. He had succeeded his father as 3rd Earl of Mulgrave in 1658 and been made Marquess of Normanby in 1694.

The duke's family descended from Sir Edmund Sheffield, second cousin of Henry VIII, who in 1547 was raised to the Peerage of England as Baron Sheffield and in 1549 was murdered in the streets of Norwich during Kett's Rebellion. His grandson, the 3rd Baron, served as Lord Lieutenant of Yorkshire from 1603 to 1619 and was created Earl of Mulgrave in 1626, also in the Peerage of England. On the death of the 2nd Duke of Buckingham and Normanby in 1735, all these titles became extinct. The Sheffield family estates passed to the 2nd duke's half-brother Charles Herbert—the illegitimate son of the 1st Duke by Frances Stewart—who changed his surname by a private act of Parliament, Herbert's Name Act 1735 (9 Geo. 2. c. 20 Pr.), to Sheffield as a condition of the 2nd duke's will, thereby becoming Charles Herbert Sheffield. Charles Herbert Sheffield was created a Baronet in 1755 and is the ancestor of the Sheffield Baronets, of Normanby.

The Mulgrave title was used again in 1767 when Constantine Phipps was made Baron Mulgrave. He was the son of William Phipps and Lady Catherine Annesley (daughter and heiress of James Annesley, 3rd Earl of Anglesey and his wife Lady Catherine Darnley, illegitimate daughter of King James II by his mistress Catherine Sedley, Countess of Dorchester). Lady Catherine Darnley later married John Sheffield, 1st Duke of Buckingham and Normanby, and hence Constantine Phipps, 1st Baron Mulgrave was the step-grandson of the 1st Duke of Buckingham and Normanby. In 1838 also the Normanby title was used again when the 1st Baron Mulgrave's grandson Constantine was made Marquess of Normanby. These titles are still extant.

Buckinghamshire is one of the ceremonial counties of England.

== Barons Sheffield (1547) ==
- Edmund Sheffield, 1st Baron Sheffield (1521–1549)
- John Sheffield, 2nd Baron Sheffield (c. 1538–1568)
- Edmund Sheffield, 3rd Baron Sheffield (c. 1564–1646) (created Earl of Mulgrave in 1626)

== Earls of Mulgrave (1626) ==
- Edmund Sheffield, 1st Earl of Mulgrave (c. 1564–1646)
- Edmund Sheffield, 2nd Earl of Mulgrave (1611–1658)
- John Sheffield, 3rd Earl of Mulgrave (1647–1721) (created Marquess of Normanby in 1694 and Duke of Buckingham and Normanby in 1703)

== Dukes of Buckingham and Normanby (1703) ==
- John Sheffield, 1st Duke of Buckingham and Normanby (1648–1721)
  - John Sheffield, Marquess of Normanby (1710)
  - Robert Sheffield, Marquess of Normanby (1711–1714)
- Edmund Sheffield, 2nd Duke of Buckingham and Normanby (1716–1735)

== Family tree ==
Sheffield family tree: Barons Sheffield, Earls of Mulgrave and Dukes of Buckingham and Normanby

Baron Sheffield (1st creation, England), 1547
Edmund Sheffield; 1521–1549; 1st Baron Sheffield
John Sheffield (c. 1538–1568); 2nd Baron Sheffield
Earl of Mulgrave (1st creation), 1626
Edmund Sheffield (c. 1564–1646); 1st Earl of Mulgrave; 3rd Baron Sheffield
James II; 1633–1701; King of England and Scotland	Edmund Sheffield; 1611–1658; 2nd Earl of Mulgrave; 4th Baron Sheffield
Marquess of Normanby (1st creation), 1694; Duke of Buckingham and Normanby, 1703
Catherine Darnley; 1680–1743	John Sheffield; 1648–1721; 1st Duke of Buckingham and Normanby and Marquess of Normanby; 3rd Earl of Mulgrave; 5th Baron Sheffield
William Phipps	Catherine Annesley (d. 1743)	John Sheffield; 1710 styled Marquess of Nomanby	Robert Sheffield; 1711–1714 styled Marquess of Nomanby	Edmund Sheffield; 1716–1735; 2nd Duke of Buckingham and Normanby and Marquess of Normanby; 4th Earl of Mulgrave; 6th Baron Sheffield
Dukedom of Buckingham and Normanby, Marquess of Nomanby (1st creation), Earl of Mulgrave, and Baron Sheffield (1st creation) extinct, 1735
Baron Mulgrave (Ireland, 1st creation), 1767
Constantine Phipps (c. 1722–1775); 1st Baron Mulgrave
Baron Mulgrave (Great Britain, 1st creation), 1790	Baron Mulgrave (Great Britain (2nd creation), recreated, 1794; Viscount Normanby; Earl of Mulgrave (2nd creation), 1812	Baron Sheffield of Dunnamore in the County of Meath, (2nd creation, Ireland), 1781; Baron Sheffield of Roscommon in the County of Roscommon, (3rd creation, Ireland), 1783; Baron Sheffield of Sheffield in the County of York, (4th creation, United Kingdom), 1802; Earl of Sheffield (Ireland) and Viscount Pevensey (Ireland), 1816
Constantine John Phipps; 1744–1792; 2nd Baron Mulgrave (Ireland); 1st Baron Mulgrave (Great Britain)	Henry Phipps; 1755–1831; 1st Earl of Mulgrave, Viscount Normanby, and Baron Mulgrave (Great Britain), 3rd Baron Mulgrave (Ireland)	John Baker-Holroyd; 1735–1821; 1st Earl of Sheffield, Viscount Pevensey, and Baron Sheffield
Barony Mulgrave (Great Britain) extinct, 1792	Baron Stanley of Alderley, 1839
John Thomas Stanley; 1766–1850; 1st Baron Stanley	Maria Josepha Holroyd; 1771–1863
Marquess of Normanby (2nd creation), 1838	Baron Eddisbury, 1848
Constantine Henry Phipps; 1797–1863; 1st Marquess of Normanby; 2nd Earl of Mulgrave, Viscount Normanby, and Baron Mulgrave (Great Britain), 4th Baron Mulgrave (Ireland)	Edward John Stanley; 1802–1869; 2nd Baron Stanley; 1st Baron Eddisbury	George Augustus Frederick Charles Holroyd; 1802–1876; 2nd Earl of Sheffield, Viscount Pevensey, and Baron Sheffield
George Augustus Constantine Phipps; 1819–1890; 2nd Marquess of Normanby; 3rd Earl of Mulgrave, Viscount Normanby, and Baron Mulgrave (Great Britain), 5th Baron Mulgrave (Ireland)	Henry Edward John Stanley; 1827–1903; 3rd Baron Stanley; 2nd Baron Eddisbury	Fredrick Henry Stuart Holroyd; 1827–1829 styled Viscount Pevensey	Henry North Holroyd; 1832–1909; 3rd Earl of Sheffield, Viscount Pevensey, and Baron Sheffield
Earldom of Sheffield, Viscount Pevensey, and Baron Sheffield (2nd and 4th creations), extinct 1909
Constantine Charles Henry Phipps; 1846–1932; 3rd Marquess of Normanby; 4th Earl of Mulgrave, Viscount Normanby, and Baron Mulgrave (Great Britain), 6th Baron Mulgrave (Ireland)	Edward Lyulph Stanley; 1839–1925; 4th Baron Sheffield (3rd creation, Ireland); 4th Baron Stanley; 3rd Baron Eddisbury
Arthur Lyulph Stanley; 1875–1931; 5th Baron Sheffield; 5th Baron Stanley; 4th Baron Eddisbury	Oliver Hugh Stanley; 1879–1952
Oswald Constantine John Phipps; 1912–1994; 4th Marquess of Normanby; 5th Earl of Mulgrave, Viscount Normanby, and Baron Mulgrave (Great Britain), 7th Baron Mulgrave (Ireland)	Edward John Stanley; 1907–1971; 6th Baron Sheffield; 6th Baron Stanley; 5th Baron Eddisbury	Lyulph Henry Victor Owen Stanley; 1915–1971; 7th Baron Sheffield; 7th Baron Stanley; 6th Baron Eddisbury	Thomas Henry Oliver Stanley; 1927–2013; 8th Baron Sheffield; 8th Baron Stanley; 7th Baron Eddisbury
Constantine Edmund Walter Phipps (b. 1954); 5th Marquess of Normanby; 6th Earl of Mulgrave, Viscount Normanby, and Baron Mulgrave (Great Britain), 8th Baron Mulgrave (Ireland)	Richard Oliver Stanley (b. 1956); 9th Baron Sheffield; 9th Baron Stanley; 8th Baron Eddisbury	Charles Ernest Stanley (b. 1960)
Heir presumptive to the Baronies Sheffield, Stanley, and Eddisbury
John Samuel Constantine Phipps (b. 1994) styled Earl of Mulgrave	Thomas Henry Winston Phipps (b. 1997)	Oliver Richard Hugh Stanley; 1986–1989
Heir apparent to the Marquessate of Normanby

== See also ==
- Sheffield Baronets of Normanby
- Baron Sheffield
- Earl of Mulgrave
- Marquess of Normanby
- Duke of Buckingham
