= Sheffield baronets =

Title in the Baronetage of Great Britain

Sheffield baronets, of Normanby
- Creation date: 1 March 1755
- Baronetage: Baronetage of Great Britain
- First holder: Sir Charles Herbert Sheffield, 1st Baronet
- Present holder: Sir Reginald Adrian Berkeley Sheffield, 8th Baronet
- Heir apparent: Robert Charles Berkeley Sheffield
- Status: Extant
- Seat: Sutton Park
- Former seats: Buckingham Palace; Normanby Hall

The Sheffield Baronetcy, of Normanby in the County of Lincoln, is a title in the Baronetage of Great Britain. It was created on 1 March 1755 for Charles Herbert Sheffield, the illegitimate son of John Sheffield, 1st Duke of Buckingham and Normanby.

On the death of his half brother, Edmund Sheffield, 2nd Duke of Buckingham, in 1735, he inherited the family estates including Buckingham House, which was sold to George III in 1762, and Normanby Hall, which remained the family residence until 1963, after which the family resided at Sutton Park, York.

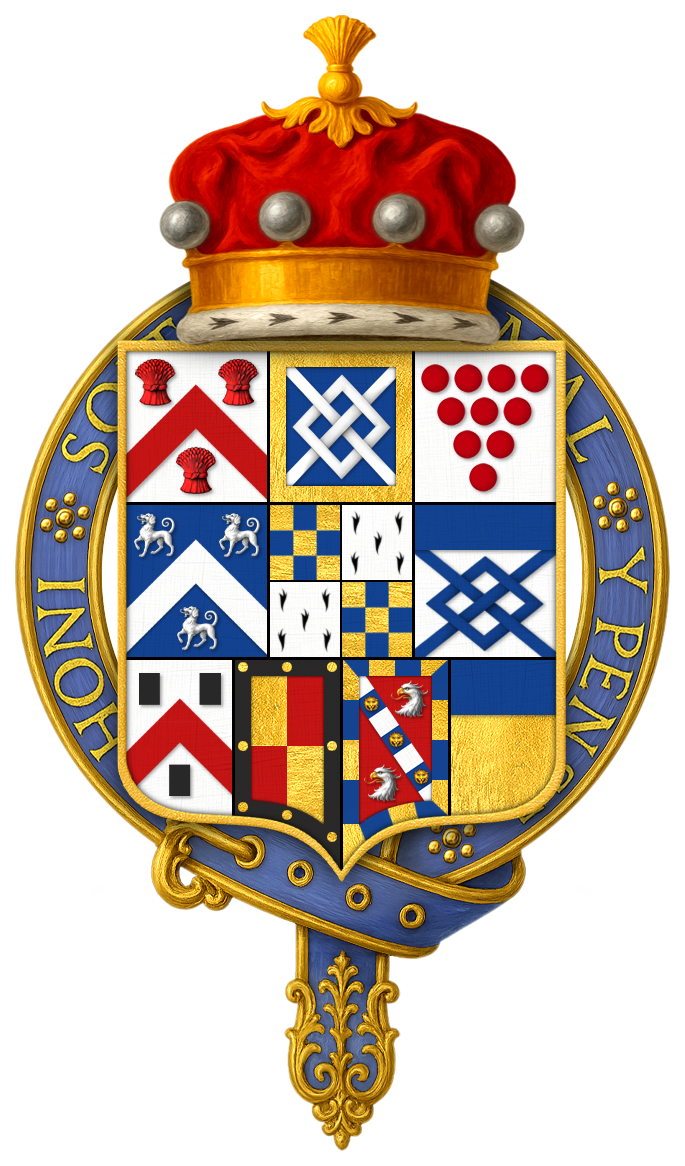
Coat of arms of Sir Edmund Sheffield, 1st Earl of Mulgrave, 3rd Baron Sheffield, KG, great-great-grandfather of the 1st Baronet

The fourth baronet served as High Sheriff of Lincolnshire in 1817. The fourth baronet's fourth son George Sheffield (13 September 1836 - 10 October 1898) was the private secretary to Richard Lyons, 1st Viscount Lyons, for over 20 years, including when Lyons was British Ambassador to the United States and British Ambassador to France.

The fifth baronet served as High Sheriff of Lincolnshire in 1872. The sixth baronet sat as Conservative member of parliament for Brigg.

Cara Delevingne is the great-great-granddaughter of the sixth baronet and Samantha Cameron is the daughter of the eighth baronet.

== Sheffield baronets, of Normanby (1755—) ==
- Sir Charles Herbert Sheffield, 1st Baronet (c. 1706–1774), who was born Charles Herbert and who took the name Sheffield by a private act of Parliament, Herbert's Name Act 1735 (9 Geo. 2. c. 20 Pr.), on the death of his half-brother Edmund Sheffield.
  - Sir John Sheffield, 2nd Baronet (c. 1743–1815)
  - Sir Robert Sheffield, 3rd Baronet (c. 1758–1815)
    - Sir Robert Sheffield, 4th Baronet (1786–1862)
      - Sir Robert Sheffield, 5th Baronet (1823–1886)
        - Sir Berkeley Digby George Sheffield, 6th Baronet (1876–1946)
          - Sir Robert Arthur Sheffield, 7th Baronet (1905–1977)
          - Edmund Charles Reginald Sheffield (1908–1977)
            - Sir Reginald Adrian Berkeley Sheffield, 8th Baronet (1946—)
              - Samantha Gwendoline Sheffield (1971–)
              - Emily Julia Sheffield (1973–)
              - Alice Daisy Victoria Sheffield (1980–)
              - Lucy Mary Sheffield (1981–)
              - (1) Robert Charles Berkeley Sheffield (1984—)
          - George Berkeley Sheffield (1910–1968)
          - John Vincent Sheffield (1913–2008)
            - (2) John Julian Lionel George Sheffield (1938—)
              - (3) John David Sheffield (1963—)
              - (4) Simon Robert Alexander Sheffield (1964—)
              - (5) Lionel Julian Sheffield (1969—)
                - (6) Jake Sheffield (1999—)
                - (7) Oliver Sheffield (2002—)

The heir apparent is the present holder's son, Robert Charles Berkeley Sheffield (born 1984).

The heir apparent's heir presumptive is the present holder's first cousin, John Julian Lionel George Sheffield (born 1938).

== Arms ==
- First five baronets bore argent, a chevron between three garbs gules, all within a bordure gobony argent and azure.
- Since 6th baronet they bore argent, a chevron engrailed between two garbs in chief gules, and in base a sheaf of arrows proper, banded also gules.

== See also ==
- Duke of Buckingham and Normanby
- Robert Sheffield

== Notes ==
Baronetage of Great Britain
Preceded by Winnington baronets	Sheffield baronets of Normanby; 1 March 1755	Succeeded by Mann baronets
