= Sir Francis Drake, 3rd Baronet =

English politician (1642–1718)

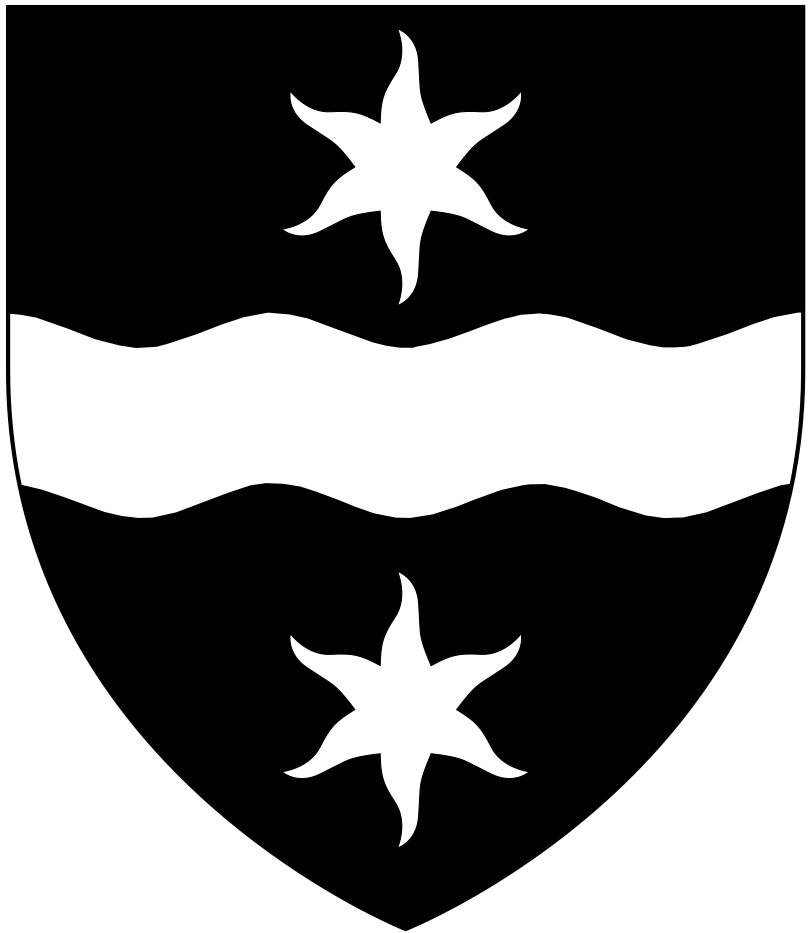
Arms of Drake of Buckland Abbey: Sable, a fess wavy between two estoiles argent

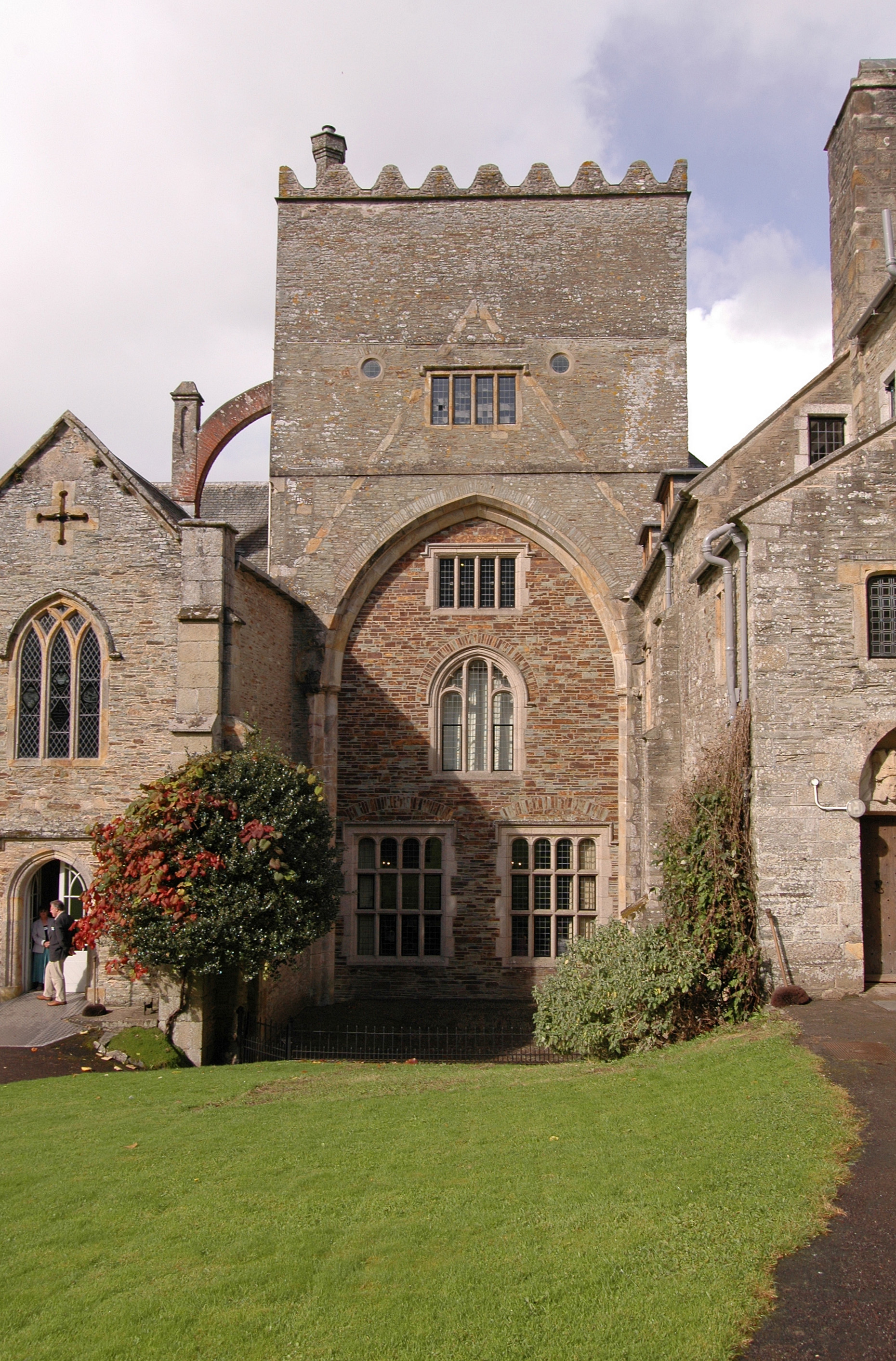
Buckland Abbey tower

Sir Francis Drake, 3rd Baronet (1642–1718), of Buckland Abbey in the parish of Buckland Monachorum and of Meavy, both in Devon, England, was elected seven times as a Member of Parliament for Tavistock in Devon, in 1673, 1679, 1681, 1689, 1690, 1696 and 1698.

== Origins ==
He was baptised on 1 May 1642, at Buckland Monachorum, the eldest surviving son and heir of Thomas Drake (born 1620), a major in the cavalry of the Parliamentarian forces during the Civil War, the second son of Sir Francis Drake, 1st Baronet (1588-1637) (nephew of Admiral Sir Francis Drake (1546-1596)) and younger brother of Sir Francis Drake, 2nd Baronet (1617-1661). His mother was Susan Crimes, a daughter of William Crymes, of Buckland Crymes and a sister of Elisha Crymes MP.

== Career ==
He succeeded to the baronetcy on the death of his uncle Sir Francis Drake, 2nd Baronet on 6 June 1661. He matriculated at Exeter College, Oxford on 3 June 1663, aged 16 and was awarded MA on 28 September 1663. In 1673 he was elected a Member of Parliament for Tavistock in Devon, in a by-election to the Cavalier Parliament. He was re-elected for Tavistock in 1679, 1681, 1689, 1690, 1696 and 1698. He purchased the manor of Meavy in Devon, and resided at the manor house west of St Peter's Church, in which survives the "Drake Aisle" or manorial chapel. The external stonework is inscribed with the date "1705" and the "Drake star" from his coat of arms.

== Marriages and children ==
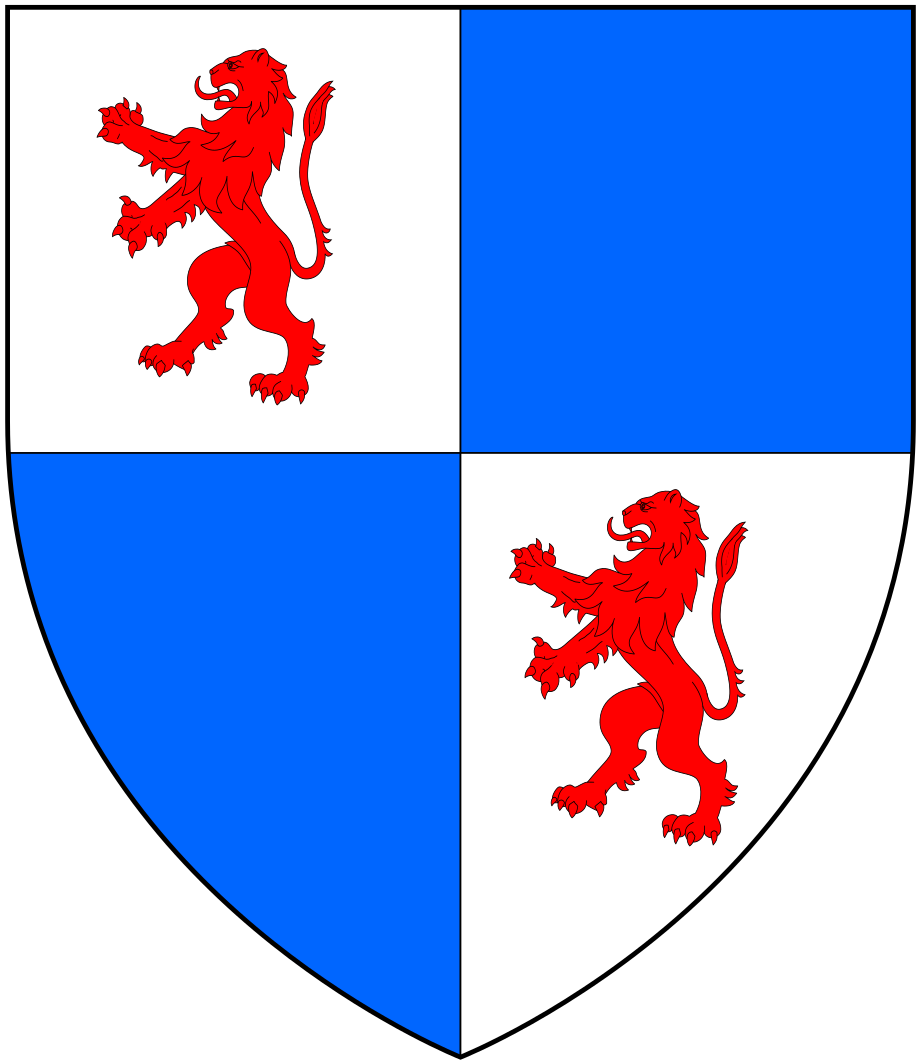
Arms of Pollexfen: Quarterly argent and azure, in the 1 and 4 quarter a lion rampant gules

Drake married three times, with children only from his third wife:

- Firstly on 6 February 1665, at Bere Ferrers in Devon, to Dorothy Bampfylde (d.1679), a daughter of Sir John Bampfylde, 1st Baronet of Poltimore House in Devon, by his wife Gertrude Copleston, daughter of Amyas Copleston of Warleigh in the parish of Tamerton Foliot, near Bere Ferrers. She died childless and was buried at Buckland on 30 January 1679.
- Secondly, by licence dated 21 October 1680, he married Anne Boone (d.1685), daughter of Thomas Boone of Mount Boone, Devon, a Member of Parliament for Dartmouth in Devon. She died childless and was buried on 22 December 1685 at Buckland.
- Thirdly, by licence dated 17 February 1690, he married Elizabeth Pollexfen (d.1717) (buried on 25 March 1717, at Meavy), a daughter and eventual co-heiress of Sir Henry Pollexfen, of Nutwell Court in Devon, Lord Chief Justice of the Common Pleas, by whom he had seven sons and one daughter, including:
  - Sir Francis Drake, 4th Baronet (1694-1740), of Buckland Abbey and Nutwell, eldest son and heir.

== Death ==
He died at the age of about 75 at Meavy where he was buried on 15 January 1718.

Parliament of England
Preceded by Lord Russell; George Howard	Member of Parliament for Tavistock; 1673–1685; With: Lord Russell 1673–1679; Lord Edward Russell 1679–1681	Succeeded by Sir James Butler; John Beare
Preceded by Sir James Butler; John Beare	Member of Parliament for Tavistock; 1689–1695; With: Lord Robert Russell	Succeeded by Lord Robert Russell; Lord James Russell
Preceded by Lord James Russell; Ambrose Manaton	Member of Parliament for Tavistock; 1696–1701; With: Lord James Russell	Succeeded by Lord James Russell; Lord Edward Russell
Baronetage of England
Preceded by Francis Drake	Baronet (of Buckland); 1662–1718	Succeeded by Francis Drake
