= Gostwick =

Gostwick is a surname. Notable people with the surname include:

- Gostwick Baronets
- John Gostwick (c. 1480–1545), English courtier, administrator, and MP
- William Gostwick (disambiguation), multiple people
