= Lord Lieutenant of Middlesex =

Civil post in Middlesex, England

This is a list of people who served as Lord Lieutenant of Middlesex. From 1794 to 1965, all Lord Lieutenants were also Custos Rotulorum of Middlesex (keeper of the rolls). The office was abolished on 1 April 1965, with the creation of Greater London and the post of Lord Lieutenant of Greater London, with small parts of Middlesex coming under the jurisdiction of the Lord Lieutenant of Surrey or the Lord Lieutenant of Hertfordshire.

- William Paget, 1st Baron Paget 1551–?
- ...
- Sir William Cecil in 1569
- ...
- Not under a commission of lieutenancy 1585–1590
- Sir Christopher Hatton 27 October 1590 – 20 November 1591
- Not under a commission of lieutenancy 20 November 1591 – 29 April 1617
- In commission 30 April 1617 – 1 June 1622
  - 30 April 1617 – 27 April 1620: Sir Robert Fowler, Sir Richard Wigmore, Sir Allen Apsley, Sir Richard Morrison, Sir Lewis Lewknor, Sir William Smith, Sir William Slingsby, Sir John Keyes, Sir John Brett, Clement Edmondes, George Calvert, Edward Fortett, Henry Spiller, Edmund Doubleday, Thomas Sanderson, Francis Mitchell
  - 27 April 1620 – 1 June 1622: Sir Edward Sackville, Sir Edward Cecil, Sir John Suckling, Sir Edward Zouch, Sir Richard Morrison, Sir Allen Apsley, Sir Francis Darcy, Sir Lewis Lewknor, Sir Richard Wigmore, Sir Thomas Middleton, Sir William Cockain, Sir Clement Edmondes, Sir Henry Spiller
- George Villiers, 1st Duke of Buckingham 1 June 1622 – 23 August 1628
- Edward Sackville, 4th Earl of Dorset 6 October 1628 – 1642 jointly with
- Henry Rich, 1st Earl of Holland 6 October 1628 – 1643
- Interregnum
- Richard Sackville, 5th Earl of Dorset 30 July 1660 – 16 July 1662 jointly with
- Thomas Howard, 1st Earl of Berkshire 30 July 1660 – 16 July 1662
- George Monck, 1st Duke of Albemarle 16 July 1662 – 3 January 1670
- William Craven, 1st Earl of Craven 22 January 1670 – 28 March 1689
- John Holles, 4th Earl of Clare 28 March 1689 – 13 February 1692
- William Russell, 1st Duke of Bedford 13 February 1692 – 7 September 1700
- Lord Edward Russell 22 November 1700 – 27 November 1701
- Wriothesley Russell, 2nd Duke of Bedford 27 November 1701 – 19 September 1711
- John Sheffield, 1st Duke of Buckingham and Normanby 19 September 1711 – 28 October 1714
- Thomas Pelham-Holles, 1st Duke of Newcastle-upon-Tyne 28 October 1714 – 2 February 1763
- Hugh Percy, 1st Duke of Northumberland 2 February 1763 – 6 June 1786
- In commission
- William Cavendish-Bentinck, Marquess of Titchfield 6 August 1794 – 29 December 1841
- James Gascoyne-Cecil, 2nd Marquess of Salisbury 29 December 1841 – 12 April 1868
- Arthur Wellesley, 2nd Duke of Wellington 28 May 1868 – 13 August 1884
- George Byng, 3rd Earl of Strafford 20 September 1884 – 28 March 1898
- Herbrand Russell, 11th Duke of Bedford 20 June 1898 – 26 April 1926
- John Baring, 2nd Baron Revelstoke 26 April 1926 – 19 April 1929
- George Kemp, 1st Baron Rochdale 11 June 1929 – 24 March 1945
- Charles Latham, 1st Baron Latham 8 September 1945 – 1 May 1956
- Frederick Handley Page 8 August 1956 – 6 January 1961
- Sir John Crocker 6 January 1961 – 9 March 1963
- Gerard Bucknall 10 July 1963 – 1965

== Deputy lieutenants ==
A deputy lieutenant of Middlesex is commissioned by the Lord Lieutenant of Middlesex. Deputy lieutenants support the work of the lord-lieutenant. There can be several deputy lieutenants at any time, depending on the population of the county. Their appointment does not terminate with the changing of the lord-lieutenant, but they usually retire at age 75.

=== 18th century ===
- 18 April 1799: John Meyrick
- 18 April 1799: William Baldwin

=== 19th century ===
- 14 August 1807: George Woodroffe
- 14 August 1807: Josias Porcher
- 14 August 1807: George Vincent
- 14 August 1807: William Pope
- 14 August 1807: Harry Edgell
- 14 August 1807: Arthur Benson
- 30 December 1807: Edward Hilliard
- 30 December 1807: George Townsend
- 25 January 1831: Osborne Yeats
- 18 June 1831: John Bentinck, 5th Duke of Portland

== Sources ==
- J.C. Sainty (1970). "Lieutenancies of Counties, 1585–1642". Bulletin of the Institute of Historical Research (Special Supplement No. 8): 27.
- J.C. Sainty (1979). List of Lieutenants of Counties of England and Wales 1660-1974. London: Swift Printers (Sales) Ltd.
