= Peshall baronets =

Extinct baronetcy in the Baronetage of England

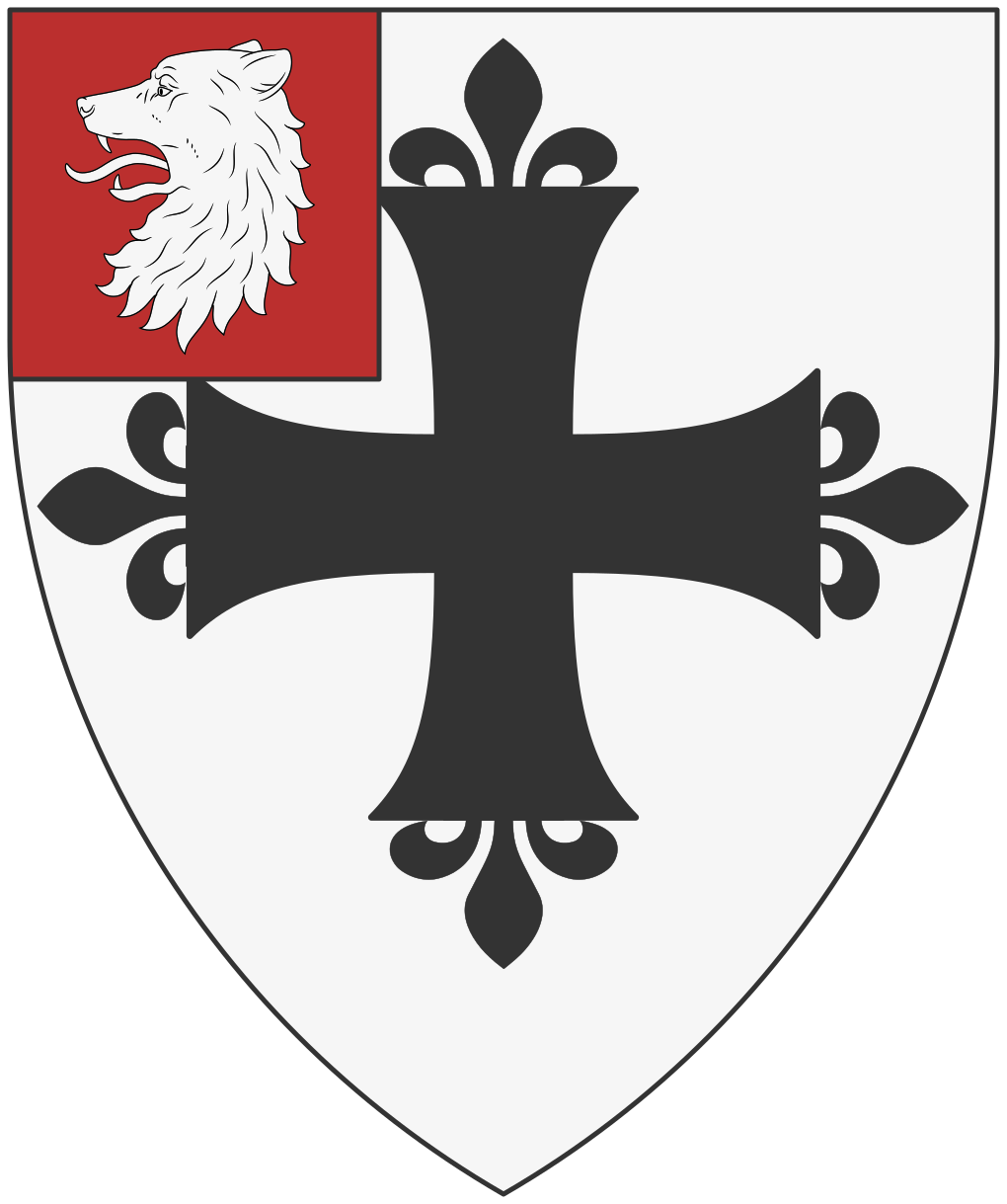
Arms of Peshall of Horsley

The Peshall Baronetcy, of Horsley in the County of Stafford, was a title in the Baronetage of England. It was created on 25 November 1611 for John Peshall. He was a descendant of an ancient family of Horseley, near Eccleshall, Staffordshire, whose representatives were often High Sheriffs of Staffordshire and Shropshire in the 14th and 15th centuries. He was High Sheriff of Staffordshire in 1615. The title is presumed to have become extinct on the death of the third Baronet in 1712.

== Peshall baronets, of Horsley (1611) ==
- Sir John Peshall, 1st Baronet (1562–1646)
- Sir John Peshall, 2nd Baronet (1628–c.1682)
- Sir Thomas Peshall, 3rd Baronet (c.1650-1712)

Baronetage of England
Preceded by Gostwick baronets	Peshall baronets 25 November 1611	Succeeded by Wyvill baronets
