= Catherine Sheffield, Duchess of Buckingham and Normanby =

Illegitimate daughter of James II of England

Her Grace The Duchess of Buckingham and Normanby
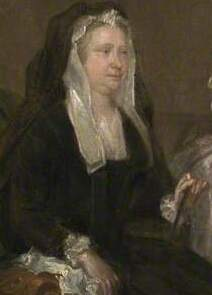
- Probably Catherine, Duchess of Buckingham, by William Hogarth, 1736.
- Born: Lady Catherine Darnley c. 1681
- Died: 13 March 1743
- Noble family: House of Stuart (illegitimate)
- Spouses: James Annesley, 3rd Earl of Anglesey; John Sheffield, 1st Duke of Buckingham and Normanby
- Issue: Lady Catherine Annesley; John Sheffield, Marquess of Normanby; Robert Sheffield, Marquess of Normanby; Edmund Sheffield, 2nd Duke of Buckingham and Normanby
- Father: James II of England
- Mother: Catherine Sedley, Countess of Dorchester

Catherine Sheffield, Duchess of Buckingham and Normanby (also spelled Katherine; c. 1681 – 13 March 1743), known as Lady Catherine Darnley until 1699 and as Catherine Annesley, Countess of Anglesey, from 1699 to 1706, was an English Jacobite noblewoman, and the acknowledged illegitimate daughter of James Stuart, Duke of York, later King James II, by his mistress Catherine Sedley, Countess of Dorchester. By royal warrant she was granted the precedence of a duke’s daughter, and through her father was half-sister to Queen Mary II, Queen Anne and James Francis Edward Stuart.

She married firstly James Annesley, 3rd Earl of Anglesey, but shortly after she obtained a divorce on account of his cruelty, and afterwards married John Sheffield, 1st Duke of Buckingham and Normanby. She became a prominent Tory and Jacobite figure at the court of Queen Anne and a consistent supporter of the Stuart succession. Commonly nicknamed "Princess Buckingham", she resided at Buckingham House (on the site of the present Buckingham Palace), and was noted for her haughty sense of rank, ostentatious style and forceful temperament, and was frequently compared with her contemporary and rival Sarah, Duchess of Marlborough. Her London drawing room was regarded as a principal gathering place for Tory politicians and Jacobite sympathisers in the early eighteenth century, often contrasted with the Whig circle at Marlborough House, and she actively promoted the claims of her half-brother James Francis Edward Stuart. Through her only surviving child, Lady Catherine Annesley, she is ancestress of the Phipps family, later Marquesses of Normanby. She died in 1743 and was buried in the Henry VII Chapel of Westminster Abbey.

== Early life and title ==
She was born in ca. 1681, the daughter of James Stuart, Duke of York, later King James II, by his mistress Catherine Sedley, Countess of Dorchester, who had worked for Mary of Modena. She had two full-siblings, James and Charles Darnley, who both died young. James appears to have acknowledged his paternity at once, and by letters patent she was conferred the title “Lady” and the surname “Darnley” with reference to her father's ancestor, Lord Darnley. In her marriage licence from the Dean of Westminster, she was styled "the Rt. Hon. Lady Catherine Darnley".

There was nevertheless some doubt about her paternity, as Catherine Sedley was thought to have other lovers. By royal warrant, Lady Catherine Darnley was given the status of a duke's daughter in the order of precedence. Her arms granted by James II are incorporated today in those of the Marquess of Normanby, indicating that King James accepted her as his natural child.

She was said to have inherited her mother’s quick temper, and Horace Walpole later described her as “more mad with pride than any mercer’s wife in Bedlam”. Her mother once attempted to humble her by claiming that her real father was Colonel James Graham of Levens Hall, to whose legitimate daughter, Catherine, Countess of Berkshire (wife of the 4th Earl of Berkshire), she was alleged to bear a striking resemblance. Colonel Graham was the Keeper of the Privy Purse to the Duke of York and was apparently known to be "very intimate with Mrs. Sedley". Walpole adds that Graham himself, observing the likeness between the two women, is said to have remarked that “kings are great men, they make free with whom they please; all I can say is that I am sure the same man begot these two women”.

In 1691, William III granted the Countess of Dorchester a pension of £1,500 a year; a receipt dated 27 May 1691 records payment of £400 as one quarter’s allowance for her daughter Katherine Darnley.

== First marriage and abusive husband ==
Lady Catherine married, as her first husband, James Annesley, 3rd Earl of Anglesey, the son of James Annesley, 2nd Earl of Anglesey and Lady Elizabeth Manners, at Westminster Abbey on 28 October 1699, when she was eighteen. Within a few months however, the marriage proved disastrous. Accounts state that she was “shamefully maltreated”, and in 1701 she alleged before the courts and the House of Lords that the earl had attempted to murder her. The Lord Chief Justice bound him over to keep the peace, whereupon the earl complained to the Lords that this order infringed his parliamentary privilege. While he was thus occupied in the House, associates of Lady Catherine, described as two men and four women in masks, removed her from his residence, ensuring that she was “out of his clutches”. On 12 June 1701, the couple were formally separated by Act of Parliament, on the grounds of the earl's cruelty.

The earl contracted tuberculosis and died early in 1702. They had one daughter:

- Lady Catherine Annesley (c. 1700–1736), who married in 1718, first, William Phipps, and second, John Sheldon (or Skelton). By her first husband, she had a son, Constantine Phipps, created 1st Baron Mulgrave in 1765.

From this their only child, Lady Catherine Annesley, the Phipps family and the later Marquesses of Normanby are descended. By his will the earl left his daughter a dowry of £15,000, stipulating that she should never again see her mother or grandmother, the Countess of Dorchester, and placing her under the guardianship of Lord Haversham.

== Duchess of Buckingham and Normanby ==
On 16 March 1706, the widowed countess married, as his third wife, John Sheffield, 1st Duke of Buckingham and Normanby; the wedding took place at St Martin-in-the-Fields. The duke, a great supporter of King James, was more than thirty years older than his new duchess. Sheffield had earlier paid court to Princess Anne, a circumstance which is said to have contributed to his temporary removal from favour, but she remained attached to him as a loyal supporter of her father, James II, and as a leading figure on the Tory side. As queen, Anne valued the duke’s services and shared his Tory sympathies, but appears to have regarded the duchess herself with some reserve and extended her no special favour beyond that due to her rank. They had three children, two of whom died in infancy:

- John Sheffield, Marquess of Normanby (1710)
- Robert Sheffield, Marquess of Normanby (1711–1715)
- Edmund Sheffield, 2nd Duke of Buckingham and Normanby (1716–1735), who died unmarried.

Their only surviving son Edmund, succeeded his father in 1721. He served under his maternal uncle, James FitzJames, 1st Duke of Berwick, during his last campaign in Germany in the War of the Polish Succession, and died in 1735 of consumption. He bequeathed to Catherine all the Mulgrave and Normanby property, and by will and testament, she left these to her daughter, thus founding her grandson's fortune, although she did not live to see him created the first Baron Mulgrave. She constructed Mulgrave Castle, a castellated mansion and country house in Yorkshire, which also passed with her daughter into the Phipps family.

The duke's previous marriages were said to have been unhappy, but he doted on Catherine, with their friend Alexander Pope claiming that "whenever they have had any difference... he could never stay till suppertime... nor till she returned back of herself into his room, but constantly left his books or business to come after her, and said, "Child, you and I should never fall out; and though I still think myself in the right, yet you shall have it in your way." When the duke died in 1721, she called on Pope and Francis Atterbury to produce a memorial edition of his poems and other works.

== Personality, politics and religion ==
Contemporary and later accounts depict the Duchess of Buckingham as a conspicuously proud and forceful figure. Noted for being “shamelessly proud” of her parentage and commonly nicknamed “Princess Buckingham”, she was frequently compared with her contemporary and sometime rival, Sarah, Duchess of Marlborough. Writers characterised her as possessing the latter’s arrogance and love of domination, but without her political judgement, while exhibiting a marked love of display, strong pertinacity, and a violent temper. Owing to her husband’s offices as Lord Privy Seal (until 1703) and later Lord President of the Council, she was a regular presence at court. At Queen Anne’s birthday celebrations in January 1711, one observer remarked that “the Duchess of Buckingham and Lady Paulet were scarce able to move under the load of jewels they had on”.

Politically, she was described as labouring “with unceasing pains” to promote the restoration of her half-brother James Francis Edward Stuart. A staunch supporter of the exiled Stuart court, she is said to have travelled repeatedly to the Continent in furtherance of the Jacobite cause and to have made a practice of visiting the tomb of James II at the English Benedictine church in the Rue Saint-Jacques, Paris, where she was reported to weep over the worn pall covering his remains, though without replacing it with a more sumptuous covering. In the party landscape of the early eighteenth century, she and the Duchess of Marlborough were regarded as parallel centres of opposition: Tories and Jacobites were said to throng the saloons of the Duchess of Buckingham, while disaffected Whigs gathered at Marlborough House. Both women were hostile to the court and were noted for their animosity towards Sir Robert Walpole.

After Queen Anne’s death in 1714 and the succession of the Hanoverian George I, the Buckinghams' openly Jacobite leanings became even more pronounced. In 1731, she is said to have sought an audience with Sir Robert Walpole in an effort to persuade him to favour a Stuart restoration, but instead inadvertently revealed elements of Jacobite planning. After hearing the Methodist preacher George Whitefield, she wrote to Selina, Countess of Huntingdon expressing strong disapproval of Methodist teaching, describing its doctrines as repugnant and disrespectful to social superiors and rejecting the notion that a person of high birth could be placed spiritually on a level with “the common wretches that crawl the earth”.

Anecdotes, principally preserved by Horace Walpole and later memoirists, emphasise her taste for pageantry. It was alleged that, being passionately attached to “shows and pageants”, she arranged a funeral for her husband as splendid as that of the Duke of Marlborough, and later sought to borrow the same funeral car for the burial of her son, provoking a sharp exchange with the Duchess of Marlborough. She was also said, particularly on the anniversary of the execution of Charles I, to receive guests at Buckingham House seated in a chair of state, dressed in deep mourning and surrounded by her ladies similarly attired, as when Lord Hervey visited as suitor to her granddaughter. She was also said to claim and exercise the privilege of driving her carriage through St James’s Park whenever she pleased, a liberty not extended to her rival, the Duchess of Marlborough. The latter complained that while she herself, as the Duke of Marlborough’s widow, was refused permission “even from taking the air for her health” in the park, the “arrogant daughter of Catherine Sedley” was indulged in this respect, despite having written what was described as a highly impertinent letter to the king.

== Later life and death ==
The Duchess of Buckingham was, in her early 40s, widowed in February 1721 when John Sheffield died at age 73.

As early as 1735, nearly eight years before she died, Catherine had commissioned a life-size wax funeral effigy of herself. A medieval tradition, this effigy was to be carried atop her coffin during the funeral rites. Duchess Catherine was the last person in Britain to have a wax effigy carried in a funeral procession. She died in London on 13 March 1743, aged 61, and was buried on 8 April 1743 in the Henry VII Chapel of Westminster Abbey, among other members of the Stuart family.

On her deathbed she is supposedly asked a clergyman whether some special respect would be paid in Heaven to a woman of such “birth and breeding”, and, on being assured that there was no “acceptance of persons”, to have replied with a sigh, “Well, if it be so, this Heaven is after all a strange place”.

== Descendants ==
As all of Catherine's children pre-deceased her, the dukedom became extinct and her late husband's estates passed to his illegitimate son, Sir Charles Herbert Sheffield, 1st Baronet. The descendants of her daughter, Lady Catherine Annesley, included Constantine Phipps, 1st Baron Mulgrave, Henry Phipps, 1st Earl of Mulgrave, the Hon. Charles Phipps, MP and General the Hon. Edmund Phipps.
