= Mann baronets of Linton Hall (1755) =

Escutcheon of the Mann baronets of Linton Hall

The Mann baronetcy, of Linton Hall in the County of Kent, was created in the Baronetage of Great Britain on 3 March 1755 for the diplomat Horace Mann, with a special remainder, in the first instance to his brother Galfridus.

His nephew, the 2nd Baronet represented Maidstone and Sandwich in the House of Commons. The title became extinct on his death in 1814, leaving no male heir.

== Mann baronets, of Linton Hall (1755) ==
- Sir Horace Mann, 1st Baronet (c. 1701–1786)
- Sir Horace Mann, 2nd Baronet (1744–1814)

== Extended family ==
The 2nd Baronet's sister, Catherine Mann, married the Right Reverend James Cornwallis, 4th Earl Cornwallis. Their son James Cornwallis, assumed by royal licence the surname of Mann in lieu of Cornwallis in 1814. In 1824 he succeeded in the earldom of Cornwallis (see Earl Cornwallis).

== Notes ==
Baronetage of Great Britain
Preceded by Sheffield baronets	Mann baronets of Linton Hall; 3 March 1755	Succeeded by Cavendish baronets
