= Sir Francis Drake, 2nd Baronet =

English politician

Sir Francis Drake, 2nd Baronet (25 September 1617 – 6 January 1662) of Buckland Abbey, Devon was an English politician who sat in the House of Commons variously between 1646 and 1662. He was a Colonel of the Horse, fighting in the Parliamentary army during the English Civil War.

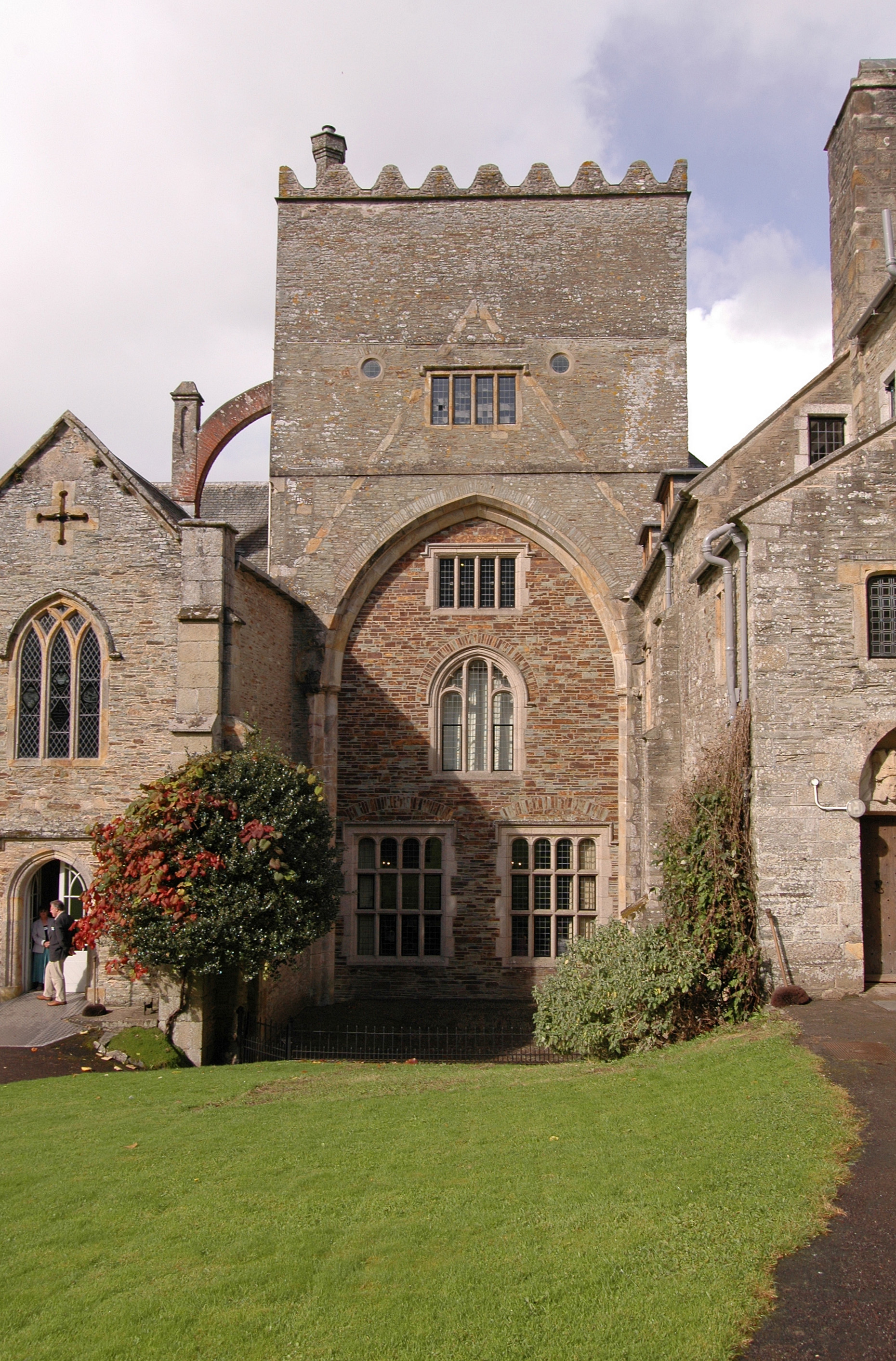
Buckland Abbey tower

Drake was the son of Sir Francis Drake, 1st Baronet of Buckland Abbey and his second wife Joan Stroud, daughter of Sir William Stroud of Newnham. He was a great-nephew of Vice Admiral, Sir Francis Drake. He succeeded to the baronetcy on the death of his father on 11 March 1637. He was appointed Sheriff of Devon for 1645.

In 1646, Drake was elected Member of Parliament for Bere Alston in the Long Parliament but following Pride's Purge in 1648, he and other Devon MPs took no part in the proceedings of the subsequent Rump Parliament.

In 1660, Drake was elected MP for Newport, Cornwall, in the Convention Parliament. He was re-elected in 1661 for the Cavalier Parliament but died in the following January at the age of 44.

Drake married Dorothy Pym daughter of John Pym of Brymore, Somerset at St Margaret's, Westminster on 18 January 1640. They had no children and the baronetcy went to his nephew Sir Francis Drake, 3rd Baronet (1642–1718).

Parliament of England
Preceded by William Strode; Charles Pym	Member of Parliament for Bere Alston; 1646–1648; With: Charles Pym	Succeeded by Not represented in Rump Parliament
Baronetage of England
Preceded by Francis Drake	Baronet (of Buckland); 1637–1662	Succeeded by Francis Drake
