= Custos Rotulorum of Middlesex =

CIvic post in Middlesex, England

This is a list of people who have served as Custos Rotulorum of Middlesex.

- Sir Roger Cholmley bef. 1544 – aft. 1547
- Edward Hastings, Baron Hastings of Loughborough bef. 1558 – 1571
- Richard Goderick bef. 1562 – bef. 1564
- Sir Thomas Wroth bef. 1564–1573
- Sir Gilbert Gerard 1573–1593
- Sir John Fortescue c. 1594–1607
- Sir Thomas Lake c. 1608–1619
- Sir Thomas Edmondes 1619–1639
- Sir Henry Vane 1639–1642
- Sir Peter Wyche 1642–1643
- Sir Edward Nicholas 1643–1646
- Interregnum
- Sir Edward Nicholas 1660–1669
- William Craven, 1st Earl of Craven 1669–1689
- John Holles, 4th Earl of Clare 1689–1692
- William Russell, 1st Duke of Bedford 1692–1700
- Lord Edward Russell 1700–1701
- Wriothesley Russell, 2nd Duke of Bedford 1701–1711
- John Sheffield, 1st Duke of Buckingham and Normanby 1711–1714
- Thomas Pelham-Holles, 1st Duke of Newcastle 1714–1762
- Hugh Percy, 1st Duke of Northumberland 1762–1786
- vacant
- Henry Dundas 1793–1794
- William Bentinck, Marquess of Titchfield 1794–1802

For later custodes rotulorum, see Lord Lieutenant of Middlesex.
