= Sir Charles Herbert Sheffield, 1st Baronet =

English peer

Sir Charles Herbert Sheffield
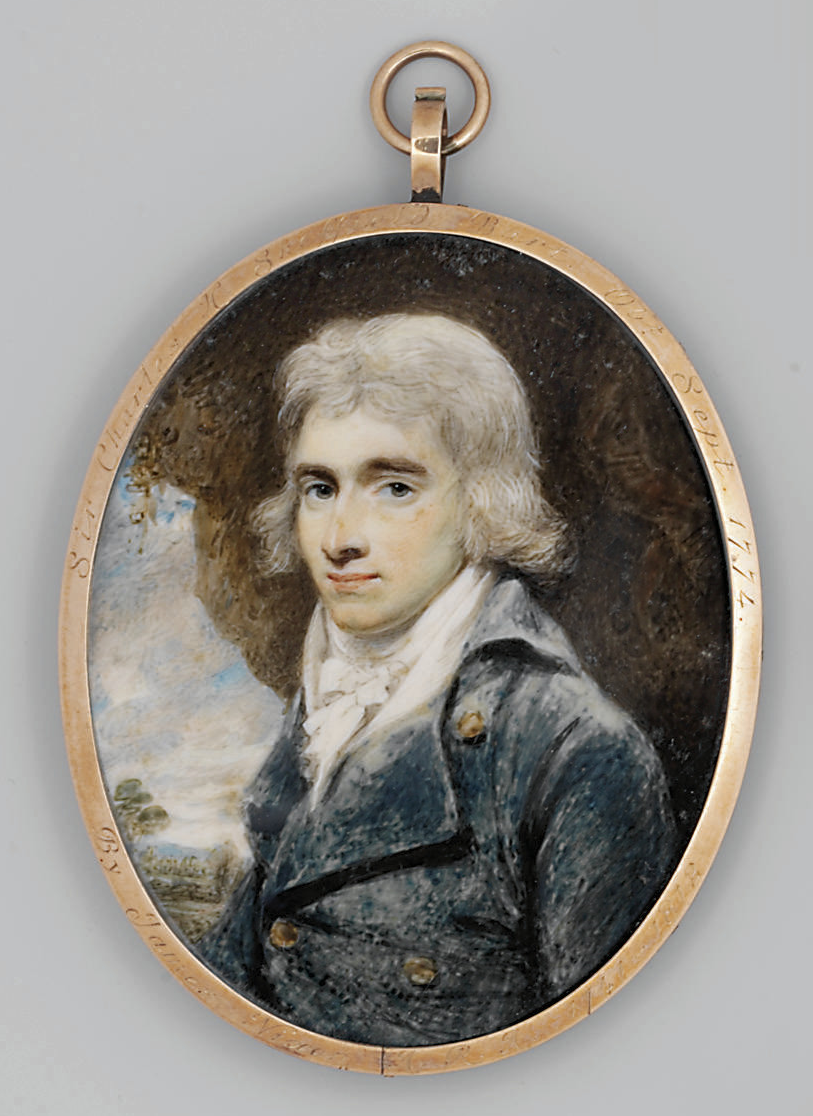

1st Baronet

Personal details
- Born: c. 1706 Normanby, Lincolnshire, England
- Died: September 5, 1774
- Spouse: Margaret Sabine (m. 1741; died 1762)
- Parents: John Sheffield, 1st Duke of Buckingham and Normanby; Frances Stewart

Sir Charles Herbert Sheffield, 1st Baronet (c. 1706 – 5 September 1774) of Normanby, Lincolnshire, England, was an illegitimate son of John Sheffield, 1st Duke of Buckingham and Normanby and the first of the Sheffield baronets, and the owner of Buckingham Palace (then known as Buckingham House) who sold it to King George III.

== Biography ==
Sheffield, baptised Charles Herbert, was an illegitimate son of John Sheffield, 1st Duke of Buckingham and Normanby, and Frances Stewart, who, then or afterwards, was the wife of The Hon. Oliver Lambart, younger son of Charles Lambart, 3rd Earl of Cavan.

Herbert's Name Act 1735
- Act of Parliament
- Parliament of Great Britain
- Long title: An Act to enable Charles Herbert Esquire, now called Charles Sheffield, and his Issue, to take and use the Surname of Sheffield, pursuant to the Will of John late Duke of Buckinghamshire and Normanby, deceased.
- Citation: 9 Geo. 2. c. 20 Pr.
- Territorial extent: Great Britain

Dates
- Royal assent: 5 May 1736
- Commencement: 15 January 1736 (Note: Start of session.)

Status: Current legislation

Sheffield was probably born about 1706 (when his mother was 22 years old, was "under the tuition of Mons. Brezy, at Utretcht", in August 1716, and by a private act of Parliament, Herbert's Name Act 1735 (9 Geo. 2. c. 20 Pr.), took the name of Sheffield, instead of Herbert. He inherited, on the death, 30 October 1735, of the 2nd and last Duke (at his age of 19), the considerable estates of both of these Dukes, in Lincolnshire and elsewhere. He was created a baronet on 1 March 1755. He died 5 September 1774.

== Family ==
On 25 April 1741, Sheffield married Margaret Diana Sabine, daughter of General Joseph Sabine, sometime Governor of Ghent and Gibraltar, and Hester Whitfield. She died on 7 January 1762, in Buckingham House, St James's Park, which shortly afterwards was sold by her husband for £21,000 to King George III.

In today's money (2023) the property was sold for £5,523,960.36.

== Bibliography ==
Baronetage of Great Britain
New creation	Baronet (of Normanby); 1755–1774	Succeeded by John Sheffield
