= John Sheffield, 1st Duke of Buckingham and Normanby =

British military officer, writer and politician (1648–1721)

His Grace The Duke of Buckingham and Normanby KG PC
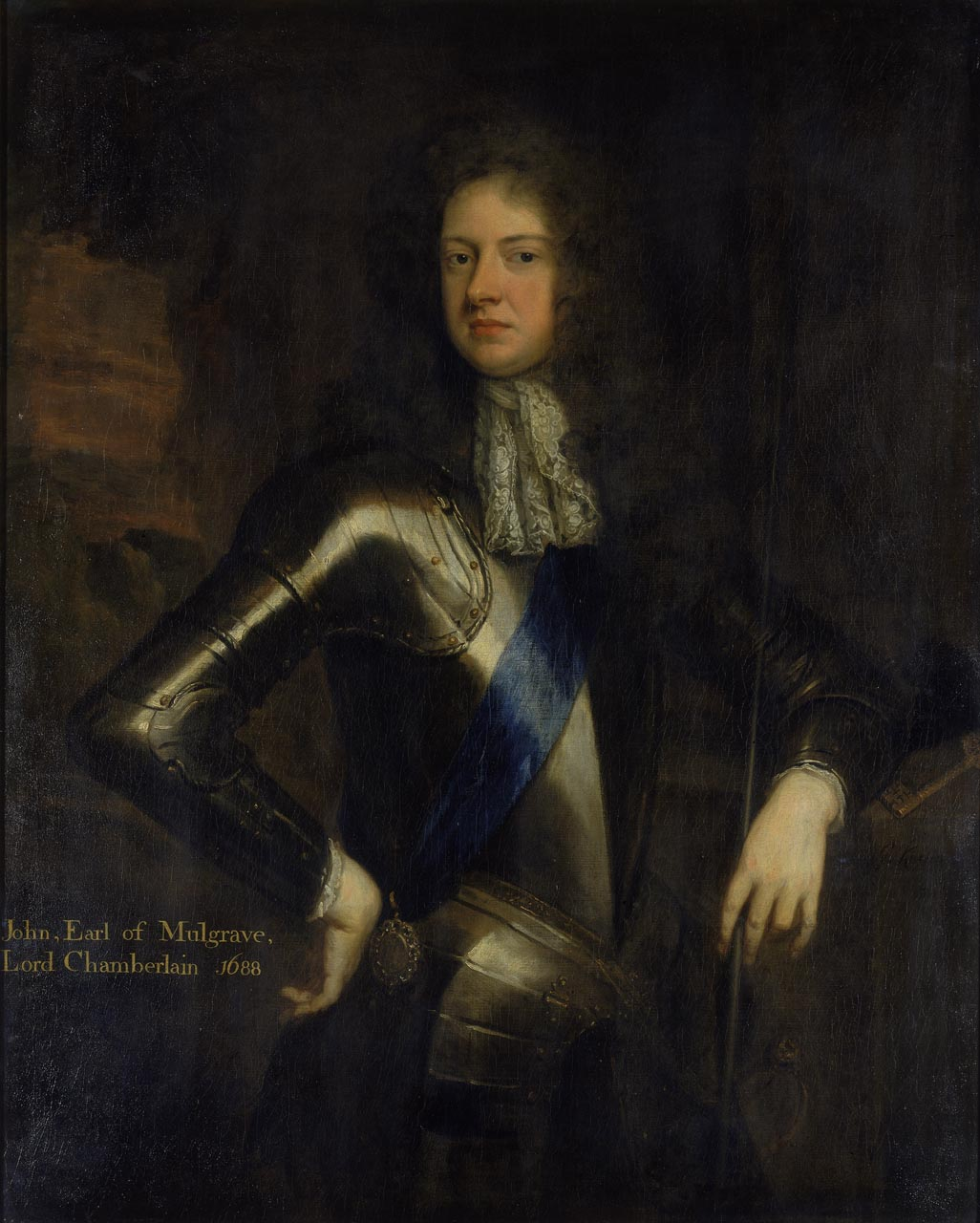
- Portrait by Godfrey Kneller, c. 1685–1686

Lord President of the Council
- In office 13 June 1711 – 23 September 1714
- Monarchs: Anne; George I
- Preceded by: The Earl of Rochester
- Succeeded by: The Earl of Nottingham
- In office 13 June 1711 – 1721

1st Duke of Buckingham and Normanby

Personal details
- Born: 8 September 1647
- Died: 24 February 1721 (aged 73)
- Children: John Sheffield, Marquess of Normanby; Robert Sheffield, Marquess of Normanby; Edmund Sheffield, 2nd Duke of Buckingham and Normanby; Sir Charles Herbert Sheffield, 1st Baronet (illegitimate)
- Parent(s): Edmund Sheffield, 2nd Earl of Mulgrave; Elizabeth Cranfield
- Occupation: Poet, politician

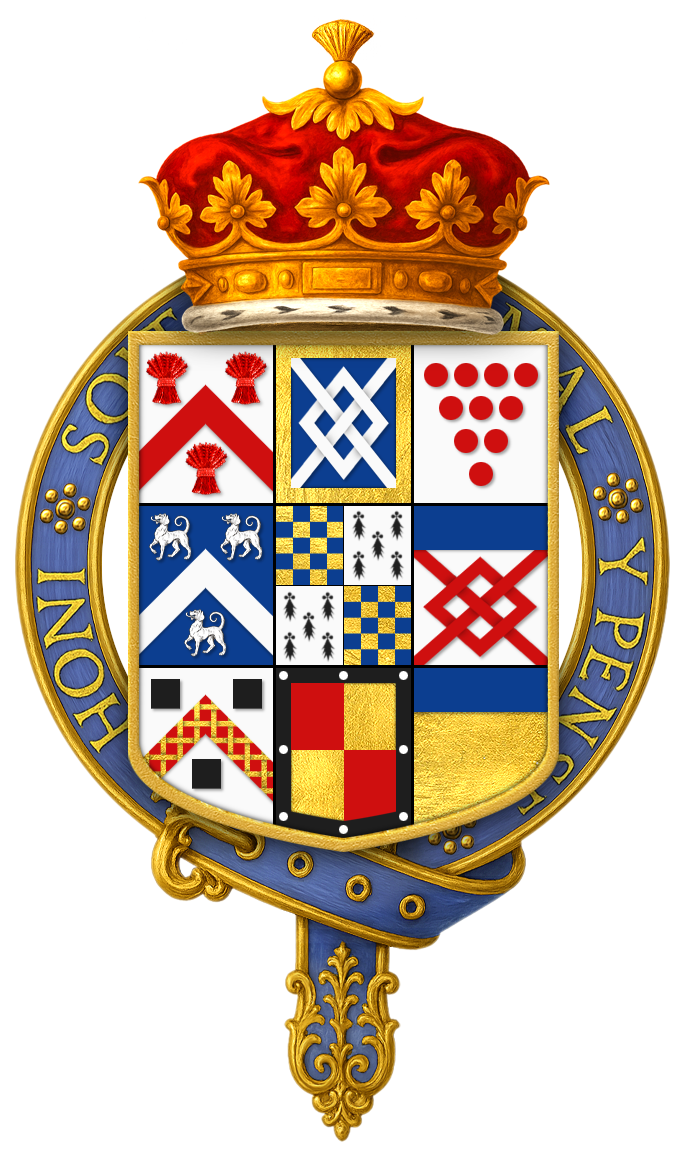
Quartered arms of John Sheffield, 1st Duke of Buckingham and Normanby, KG

John Sheffield, 1st Duke of Buckingham and Normanby (8 September 1647 – 24 February 1721) was a British military officer, writer and Tory politician who served as Lord Privy Seal and Lord President of the Council. He was also known by his original title, Lord Mulgrave.

== Life ==
John Sheffield was the only son of Edmund Sheffield, 2nd Earl of Mulgrave, and succeeded his father as 3rd Earl and 5th Baron Sheffield in 1658.

At the age of eighteen he joined the fleet, to serve in the Second Anglo-Dutch War; on the renewal of hostilities in 1672 he was present at the Battle of Sole Bay, and in the next year received the command of a ship. He was also made a colonel of infantry, and served for some time under Henri de La Tour d'Auvergne, Viscount of Turenne. He was made a Knight of the Garter in 1674. In 1680 he was put in charge of an expedition sent to relieve the Garrison of the town of Tangier, which was then under siege by Moulay Ismail ibn Sharif. It was said that he was provided with a rotten ship in the hope that he would not return, but the reason of this abortive plot, if plot there was, is not exactly ascertained. At court he took the side of the Duke of York and helped to bring about the Duke of Monmouth's disgrace.

In 1682 he was dismissed from the court, apparently for putting himself forward as a suitor for the Princess Anne (who that year was aged 17 while Sheffield was 35 and himself not yet married), but on the accession of King James II, he received a seat in the Privy Council, and was made Lord Chamberlain. (He later married Catherine, the daughter of the king's mistress, Catherine Sedley). He supported James in his most unpopular measures, and stayed with him in London during the time of his flight. He also protected the Spanish ambassador from the dangerous anger of the mob. He acquiesced, however, in the "Glorious Revolution", and in 1694 was made Marquess of Normanby. In 1696 he refused in company with other Tory peers to sign an agreement to support William III as their "rightful and lawful king" against Jacobite attempts, and was consequently dismissed from the privy council. On the accession of Queen Anne, of whom he was a personal favourite, he was appointed Lord Privy Seal and Lord Lieutenant of the North Riding of Yorkshire, and in 1703 was created Duke of Buckingham and Normanby. (Buckinghamshire is one of the ceremonial counties of England.)

During the predominance of the Whigs between 1705 and 1710, Buckingham was deprived of his office as Lord Privy Seal, but in 1710 he was made Lord Steward, and in 1711 Lord President of the Council. After Queen Anne's death he was not reappointed. He died on 24 February 1721 at his house in St. James's Park, on the site of the present Buckingham Palace. Buckingham was succeeded by his son, Edmund (1716–1735), on whose death the titles became extinct.

== Literary works ==
Buckingham was the author of An Account of the Revolution and some other essays, and of numerous poems, among them An Essay upon Poetry and An Essay upon Satyr [Satire]. It is probable that An Essay upon Satyr, which attacked many notable persons, "sauntering Charles" amongst others, was circulated in MS. It was often attributed at the time to Dryden, who accordingly suffered a thrashing at the hands of Lord Rochester's bravoes for the reflections it contained upon the earl. Mulgrave was a patron of Dryden, who may possibly have revised it, but was certainly not responsible, although it is commonly printed with his works. Mulgrave adapted Shakespeare's Julius Caesar, breaking it up into two plays, Julius Caesar and Marcus Brutus. He introduced choruses between the acts, two of these being written by Alexander Pope, and an incongruous love scene between Brutus and Portia. He was a constant friend and patron of Pope, who expressed a flattering opinion of his Essay upon Poetry. This, although smoothly enough written, deals chiefly with commonplaces.

In 1721 Edmund Curll published a pirated edition of his works, and was brought before the bar of the House of Lords for breach of privilege accordingly. An authorized edition under the superintendence of Pope appeared in 1723, but the authorities cut out the Account of the Revolution and The Feast of the Gods on account of their alleged Jacobite tendencies. These were printed at the Hague in 1727. Pope disingenuously repudiated any knowledge of the contents. Other editions reappeared in 1723, 1726, 1729, 1740 and 1753. His Poems were included in Johnson's and other editions of the British poets.

== Family ==
On 18 March 1685, in the chapel of Littlecote House, Ramsbury, Wiltshire, Buckingham married as his first wife Ursula Stawell, a daughter of George Stawell by his marriage to Ursula Austen. She died on 13 August 1697.

He married secondly Catherine Greville, a daughter of Fulke Greville, 5th Baron Brooke, and Sarah (née Dashwood), on 12 March 1698 in St Clement Danes, Westminster. She also died young, on 7 February 1703.

Buckingham married, thirdly, Lady Catherine Darnley (1680 – 13 March 1743), an illegitimate daughter of King James II and Catherine Sedley, on 16 March 1705 in St Martin-in-the-Fields, Covent Garden, London. They had three sons, John, Robert and Edmund, of whom only Edmund survived, and succeeded him as 2nd Duke of Buckingham, although he died unmarried on 30 October 1735, when all his titles became extinct.

Around 1706, Buckingham sired an illegitimate son, Charles with Frances Stewart, and, then or afterwards, wife of The Hon. Oliver Lambart, younger son of Charles Lambart, 3rd Earl of Cavan. Upon the death of his half-brother Edmund, 2nd Duke of Buckingham, Charles inherited the family estates and was the first of the Sheffield baronets.

== Notes ==
Political offices
| Preceded by The Earl of Ailesbury | Lord Chamberlain; 1685–1689 | Succeeded by The Earl of Dorset |
| Preceded by In Commission | Lord Privy Seal; 1702–1705 | Succeeded by The Duke of Newcastle |
| Preceded by The Duke of Devonshire | Lord Steward; 1710–1711 | Succeeded by The Earl Poulett |
| Preceded by The Earl of Rochester | Lord President of the Council; 1711–1714 | Succeeded by The Earl of Nottingham |
Military offices
| Preceded by Sir Walter Vane | Colonel of The Holland Regiment; 1673–1682 | Succeeded by The Earl of Chesterfield |
| Preceded by The Duke of Monmouth | Governor of Kingston-upon-Hull; 1679–1682 | Succeeded by The Earl of Plymouth |
| Preceded by The Earl of Chesterfield | Colonel of The Holland Regiment; 1684–1685 | Succeeded by Theophilus Oglethorpe |
Honorary titles
| Preceded by The Duke of Monmouth | Lord Lieutenant of the East Riding of Yorkshire; 1679–1682 | Succeeded by The Duke of Somerset |
| Preceded by Sir John Hotham, Bt | Custos Rotulorum of the East Riding of Yorkshire; 1680–1682 | Succeeded by The Duke of Somerset |
| Preceded by The Duke of Somerset | Lord Lieutenant of the East Riding of Yorkshire; 1687–1688 | Succeeded by The 2nd Duke of Newcastle-upon-Tyne |
| Preceded by The Duke of Somerset | Custos Rotulorum of the East Riding of Yorkshire; 1687–1689 | Succeeded by The Marquess of Carmarthen |
| Vacant Title last held by The Earl of Mulgrave | Vice-Admiral of Yorkshire; 1659 | Vacant |
| Vacant | Vice-Admiral of Yorkshire; 1669–1692 | Succeeded by The Viscount of Irvine |
| Vacant Title last held by The Earl of Carlisle | Vice-Admiral of Durham; 1687–1689 | Succeeded by The Viscount Lumley |
| Vacant Title last held by The Earl of Carlisle | Vice-Admiral of Northumberland; 1687–1689 | Succeeded by The Viscount Lumley |
| Preceded by The Viscount of Irvine | Lord Lieutenant of the North Riding of Yorkshire; 1702–1705 | Succeeded by The 1st Duke of Newcastle-upon-Tyne |
| Preceded by The 1st Duke of Newcastle-upon-Tyne | Lord Lieutenant of the North Riding of Yorkshire; 1711–1714 | Succeeded by The Earl of Holderness |
| Preceded by The Duke of Bedford | Lord Lieutenant of Middlesex; 1711–1714 | Succeeded by The Earl of Clare |
| Preceded by The Duke of Bedford | Custos Rotulorum of Middlesex; 1711–1714 | Succeeded by The Earl of Clare |
Peerage of England
| New creation | Duke of Buckingham and Normanby; 1703–1721 | Succeeded by Edmund Sheffield |
| New creation | Marquess of Normanby; 1694–1721 | Succeeded by Edmund Sheffield |
| Preceded by Edmund Sheffield | Earl of Mulgrave; 1658–1721 | Succeeded by Edmund Sheffield |
