= Edmund Sheffield, 2nd Earl of Mulgrave =

English peer

- Born: December 1611
- Died: 24 August 1658 (aged 46)
- Title: 2nd Earl of Mulgrave
- Spouse: Elizabeth Cranfield
- Children: John Sheffield, 1st Duke of Buckingham and Normanby
- Parent(s): Sir John Sheffield; Grizel Anderson
- Relatives: Edmund Sheffield, 1st Earl of Mulgrave (grandfather)

Edmund Sheffield, 2nd Earl of Mulgrave (December 1611 – 24 August 1658) was an English peer who supported the Parliamentary cause during the English Civil War period.

== Early life ==
Edmund Sheffield was born in December 1611 to Sir John Sheffield (drowned in 1614), son of Edmund Sheffield, 1st Earl of Mulgrave, and Grizel Anderson, daughter of Sir Edmund Anderson, Chief Justice of the Common Pleas.

== House of Lords ==
As grandson of the First Earl, Mulgrave succeeded to his title in October 1646, and also succeeded his grandfather as Vice-Admiral of Yorkshire.

He sat in the House of Lords until its abolition, and was a member of the Council of State during the Commonwealth. In 1658 he was nominated as a member of Cromwell's Upper House, but, like most of the other peers summoned, declined to serve.

== Personal life ==
Mulgrave married Elizabeth Cranfield, daughter of the Earl of Middlesex. They had a son, John.

== Death and legacy ==
On 24 August 1658, Mulgrave died. Their son, John, who succeeded to the earldom, was later created Marquess of Normanby and Duke of Buckingham and Normanby, and was Lord Privy Seal and Lord President of the Council during the reign of Queen Anne.

== Sources ==
- Leigh Rayment's Peerage Pages
- The Concise Dictionary of National Biography
- Cobbett's Parliamentary history of England, from the Norman Conquest in 1066 to the year 1803 (London: Thomas Hansard, 1808)
- House of Lords Journal, 12 November 1646
- Institute of Historical Research: Lists of office holders

Peerage of England
Preceded by Edmund Sheffield	Earl of Mulgrave; 1646–1658	Succeeded by John Sheffield
Honorary titles
Preceded by The Earl of Mulgrave	Vice-Admiral of Yorkshire; 1646–1649	Vacant Title next held by Luke Robinson
Vacant Title last held by Luke Robinson	Vice-Admiral of Yorkshire; 1652	Vacant Title next held by The Earl of Mulgrave
