= Sir Boteler Chernock, 4th Baronet =

Sir Boteler Chernock, 4th Baronet (1696–1756) of Holcot, Bedfordshire, was a British Tory politician who sat in the House of Commons from 1740 to 1747.

Chernock was baptized on 30 April 1696, the eldest son of Sir Pynsent Chernock, 3rd Baronet MP, and his wife Helen Boteler, daughter of William Boteler of Biddenham, Bedfordshire. He matriculated at Merton College, Oxford in 1714. Chernock succeeded to an impoverished estate on 2 September 1734 because his father had to sell some of it to pay the expenses of his elections. It was said he was too honest and upright while in Parliament to sacrifice the liberties of his country for a place or pension.

Chernock was returned as a Tory Member of Parliament for Bedford at a by-election on 24 November 1740. He was again returned unopposed in 1741, and voted against the Administration in all recorded occasions. He was defeated in 1747 by the Whig nominees of the 4th Duke of Bedford, and did not stand again.

Chernock died unmarried in 1756 and was buried at Holcot on 4 August 1756. He was succeeded in the baronetcy by his brother Villers.

Parliament of Great Britain
Preceded by Samuel Ongley; Sir Jeremy Sambrooke, Bt	Member of Parliament for Bedford; 1740 –1747; With: Samuel Ongley	Succeeded by Thomas Gore; John Offley
Baronetage of England
Preceded by Pynsent Chernock	Baronet (of Holcot); 1734-1756	Succeeded by Villiers Chernock
