= Sir William Gostwick, 4th Baronet =

English Whig politician

Sir William Gostwick, 4th Baronet (21 August 1650 – 24 January 1720) was an English Whig politician who served as MP for Bedfordshire from 1698 to 1713.

== Early life ==
Gostwick was baptised on 21 August 1650. He was the second, but eldest surviving, son of Sir Edward Gostwick, 3rd Baronet (1619–1659) and the former Mary Lytton. He was one of five sons and two daughters, all of whom died unmarried except for William.

His paternal grandparents were Sir Edward Gostwick, 2nd Baronet and the former Anne Wentworth (a daughter of John Wentworth, MP for Essex and for Wootton Bassett). His uncle, Thomas Gostwick, married Elizabeth Dorislaus (a daughter of Sir Isaac Dorislaus, Ambassador from Holland to Oliver Cromwell). His maternal grandparents were Sir William Lytton of Knebworth, MP for Hertfordshire, and Anne Slaney (granddaughter of Sir Stephen Slaney).

He was educated at Hadley, Middlesex under Mr. Lowell before matriculating at Sidney Sussex College, Cambridge in 1667.

== Career ==
Gostwick was knighted on 24 November 1668, before succeeding to his father's baronetcy on 24 February 1671. He was appointed Burgess of Bedfordshire in 1676. In 1679, he was appointed High Sheriff of Bedfordshire, serving until 1680. His grandfather had previously held the post from 1626 to 1627 as well as his great-grandfather, Sir William Gostwick, 1st Baronet, who held the post from 1595 to 1596.

Although he was still purchasing land as late as 1686, when he added another Bedfordshire manor to his estate, he began borrowing money the following year and, by the time he stood for Parliament in 1698, had already taken out mortgages of over £10,000 on his property. His last recorded vote was on 18 June 1713, over the French commerce bill, which he opposed. He did not stand again, likely because he was crippled by debt.

Around 1717, "he agreed to sell his entire estate for £47,000, some £9,000 less than the total of his debts, in the hope that his creditors would agree to take a loss and divide the purchase price among themselves, the encumbrances being 'so confused and intermixed, and the priorities unknown and so difficult to be discovered'. The scheme fell through, however, because of the refusal of a few creditors to accede, including the biggest, the Duke of Marlborough," who had acquired about "£27,000-worth of the mortgages on Gostwick's estate."

== Personal life ==
On 17 September 1668, he married Mary Boteler, a daughter of Sir Philip Boteler of Hatfield Woodhall, Hertfordshire. They were the parents of two sons and three daughters, including:

- John Gostwick (d. 1715), who married Martha Hammond, daughter of Anthony Hammond, Esq. of Cambridge.
- Mary Gostwick, who married Edward Nelthorpe, Esq., second son of Sir Goddard Nelthorpe, 2nd Baronet.

Sir William died on 24 January 1720 at his lodgings in St Martin-in-the-Fields, was buried at Willington, and was succeeded in the baronetcy by his grandson, William. His will specified "only £30 for mourning and leaving all his estate, real and personal, in trust for a grandson, an army officer on the Irish establishment." The trustees of his estate, which included the James Brydges, 1st Duke of Chandos and Edward Russell, 1st Earl of Orford, refused to act, and the unfortunate heir was obliged to apply for the administration himself. He gained nothing from his inheritance, for the estate was eventually sold off to satisfy the creditors, part in 1727 by an order of Chancery and the residue (for £51,000) four years later by private treaty, to the Duchess of Marlborough."

=== Descendants ===
Through his daughter Mary, he was a grandfather of James Nelthorpe, of Lynford Hall, MP for Tiverton from 1728 to 1734.

Parliament of England
| Preceded by Lord Edward Russell; William Duncombe | Member of Parliament for Bedfordshire; 1698–1707; With: Lord Edward Russell; Sir Pynsent Chernock, Bt | Succeeded by Parliament of Great Britain |
Parliament of Great Britain
| Preceded by Parliament of England | Member of Parliament for Bedfordshire; 1707–1713; With: Sir Pynsent Chernock, Bt; Lord Edward Russell | Succeeded by Sir Pynsent Chernock, Bt; John Harvey |
Baronetage of England
| Preceded by Edward Gostwick | Baronet (of Willington); 1671–1720 | Succeeded by William Gostwick |
