= Pynsent Chernock =

British landowner and politician

Sir Pynsent Chernock, 3rd Baronet (before 1670 – 2 September 1734) was a Tory landowner and Member of Parliament from Bedfordshire. He became knight of the shire for the county in 1705 by a comfortable margin, but declined to contest it in the next election in 1708. Chernock subsequently sold one of his manors, perhaps to pay for his electioneering expenses. After a close election in 1713, his political career ended with a defeat in 1715.

== Education and family ==
Chernock was born sometime before 1670, the eldest son of Sir Villiers Chernock, 2nd Baronet, of Holcot (Hulcote), Bedfordshire and his wife Anne Pynsent. He was educated at the Inner Temple in 1684 and admitted a fellow-commoner of Queens' College, Cambridge on 30 March 1685. On 9 June 1691, he married Helen Boteler (died 1741), the daughter and coheir of William Boteler. They had three sons and five daughters, of whom one son and daughter died during Chernock's life. He became a burgess of Bedford in 1693, and succeeded his father in the baronetcy and inherited Holcot in October 1694. He was pricked as High Sheriff of Bedfordshire at the end of 1702, but was replaced by Thomas Johnson.

== First term ==
He first stood for Parliament in 1705 as a Tory. The political collapse of the Earl of Ailesbury after the Glorious Revolution had deprived the Tories of a patron in Bedfordshire, dominated by the Whig Dukes of Bedford and Earls of Bolingbroke. By 1704, however, they had recovered some strength, and Chernock enjoyed the support of Ailesbury's son and heir, Lord Bruce. The Tory Lord Ashburnham, who had supported Bedford's candidates in the previous election, also backed him, and he was supported by the Bruce-backed High Church interest in the shire. Chernock's early declaration of his candidacy brought him a number of "plumpers" (voters who voted for only one candidate for the two seats), and while the second Tory candidate, John Harvey, was defeated, Chernock topped the poll and pushed out the Whig Lord Edward Russell, the Duke of Bedford's uncle, who polled slightly lower than his fellow Whig Sir William Gostwick.

In the new Parliament, he voted for William Bromley in his unsuccessful candidacy for the Speakership. He continued to be classed as a Tory, but was not active in Parliament, and stood down at the 1708 election; Lord Edward Russell regained the seat. The sale of one of Chernock's manors in 1709 may have been to offset electioneering expenses; his political opponent, the Duke of Bedford, recorded that he was forced to make the sale "having been always too honest and upright while in Parliament to sacrifice the liberties of his country for a place or pension".

== Second term and death ==
Chernock did not stand again until 1713. By this time, the deaths of the Duke of Bedford and the Earl of Bolingbroke had disordered the Whig nobility of the county, of which the Duke of Kent became effective leader. The increasing popularity and local organization of the Tories allowed Chernock and Harvey to triumph narrowly over the Whig candidates, John Cater and William Hillersden. Again, Chernock was relatively inactive in Parliament, managing a bill on Bedfordshire highways. His support for the Tory candidates in Bedford failed to secure them that seat in the 1715 election, and he himself was defeated in Bedfordshire by Hillersden. This marked the end of his active political involvement, although the Jacobites reported him a likely sympathizer with their cause in 1721. He died at his seat, where he was buried, on 2 September 1734. His son succeeded him in the estate and baronetcy.

Parliament of England
Preceded by Lord Edward Russell; Sir William Gostwick	Member of Parliament for Bedfordshire; 1705–1707; With: Sir William Gostwick	Succeeded by Parliament of Great Britain
Parliament of Great Britain
Preceded by Parliament of England	Member of Parliament for Bedfordshire; 1707–1708; With: Sir William Gostwick	Succeeded by Sir William Gostwick; Lord Edward Russell
Preceded by Sir William Gostwick; Lord Edward Russell	Member of Parliament for Bedfordshire; 1713–1715; With: John Harvey	Succeeded by John Harvey; William Hillersden
Honorary titles
Preceded by Thomas Bromsall	High Sheriff of Bedfordshire; 1702	Succeeded by Thomas Johnson
Baronetage of England
Preceded by Villiers Chernock	Baronet (of Holcot); 1694–1734	Succeeded by Boteler Chernock
