= Arianne Chernock =

American historian

- Born: 1975 (age 50–51)
- Occupation: Historian

Academic background
- Education: Brown University; University of California, Berkeley
- Doctoral advisor: Thomas W. Laqueur; Carla Hesse

Arianne Jessica Chernock (born 1975) is an American historian specialized in modern Britain and the history of Europe. She has written two books on women's rights and the history of women in the United Kingdom. Chernock is a professor at Boston University.

== Life ==
Chernock completed a B.A. magna cum laude in the department of history at Brown University in May 1997. She completed a M.A. (1999) and a Ph.D. (2004) in the department of history at University of California, Berkeley. Her dissertation committee chairs were Thomas W. Laqueur and Carla Hesse.

Chernock was an assistant professor in the university writing program at Columbian College of Arts and Sciences from 2004 to 2006. In 2006, she joined the faculty in the Boston University department of history as an assistant professor. She was promoted to associate professor in 2013 and to full professor in 2022.

== Selected works ==
- Chernock, Arianne (2009). Men and the Making of Modern British Feminism. Stanford University Press. ISBN 978-0-8047-7293-8.
- Chernock, Arianne (2019). The Right to Rule and the Rights of Women. Cambridge University Press. ISBN 978-1-108-48484-8.
