= Chernock baronets =

English baronet

- Escutcheon of the Chernock baronets of Holcot
- Creation date: 1661
- Status: extinct
- Extinction date: 1779

The Chernock Baronetcy of Holcot (Hulcote), Bedfordshire was created in the Baronetage of England on 21 May 1661 for St John Chernock.

== Chernock baronets, of Holcot (1661) ==
- Sir St John Chernock, 1st Baronet (c. 1619–1680) – He married Audrey Villiers, daughter of Sir William Villiers, 1st Baronet.
- Sir Villiers Chernock, 2nd Baronet (c.1641–1694) – MP for Bedfordshire (1685–1687). High Sheriff of Bedfordshire in 1680.
- Sir Pynsent Chernock, 3rd Baronet (by 1670–1734) – MP for Bedfordshire (1705–1708) and (1713–1715). High Sheriff of Bedfordshire in 1703.
- Sir Boteler Chernock, 4th Baronet (1696–1756) – MP for Bedford (1740–1747)
- Sir Villiers Chernock, 5th Baronet (died 1779) – Baronetcy extinct on his death.

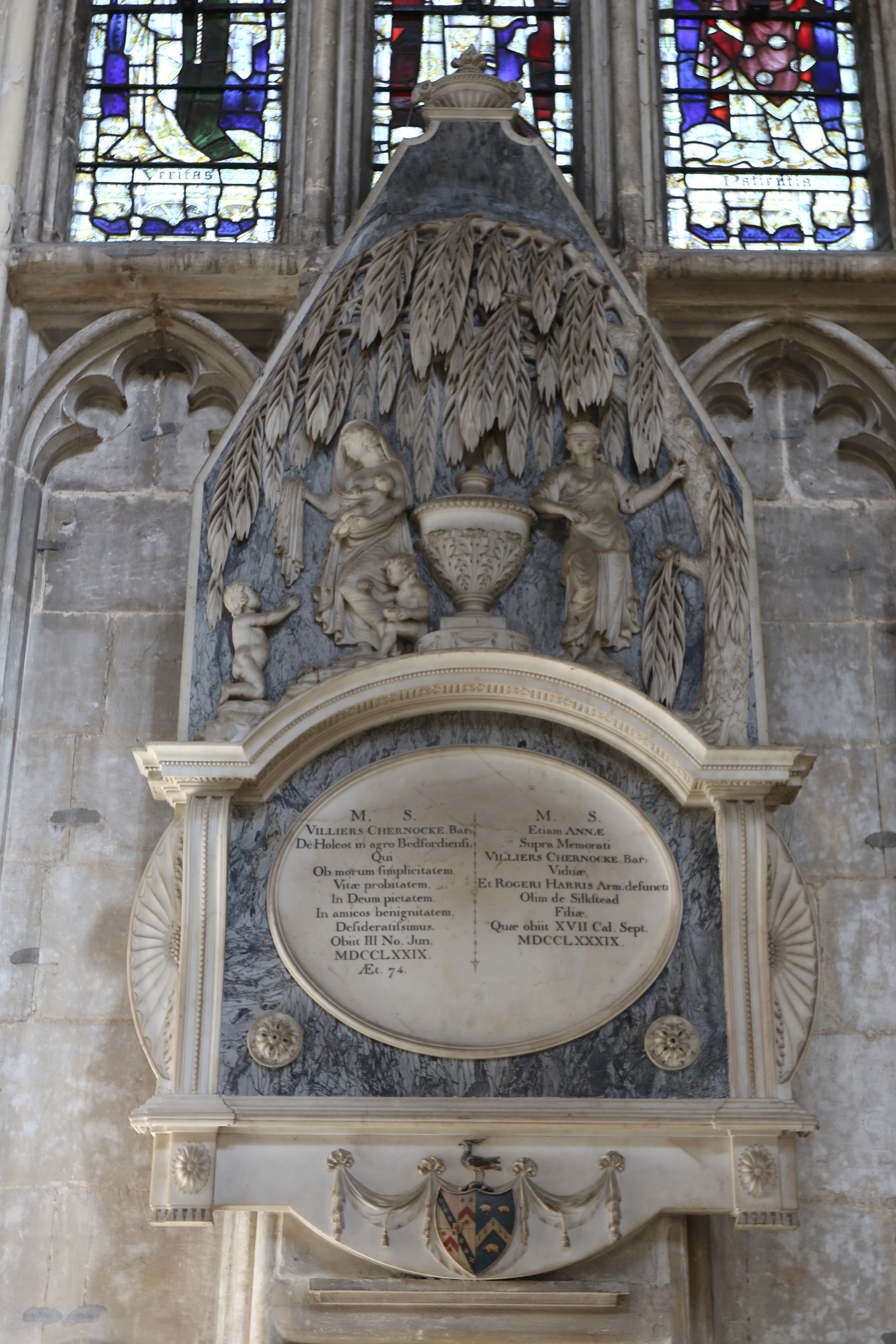
Monument to Sir Villiers Chernock, 5th Baronet (died 1779), Winchester Cathedral
