= John Beare =

John Beare (November 14, 1820 – April 5, 1914) was a farmer and mill-owner from present day Reach Township, Ontario.

Beare, was born in Bideford, England and came to Upper Canada at the age of 19 and worked as a tailor until 1843. In that year, he homesteaded 100 acres (0.40 km^{2}) in Reach. By 1850, he had improved the farm to the point where he brought his fiancé from England and was married. His farm grew to 200 acres (0.81 km^{2}) and he acquired a flour and grist mill. Eventually he acquired a second mill and enlarged his holdings of land so that all his sons could be located on their own farms within the township.

Beare was an enterprising and progressive farmer. His prosperity allowed him to be the leader in the use of farm machinery such as reapers, rakes, seed-drills, threshing machine, and gang-ploughs. In turn, his farm was the most successful in the area.

John Beare was an important figure of his time. He embodied the ideal homesteader who developed the country and succeeded financially. Homesteading often was a subsistence economy. He successfully turned his life's work into a venture in capitalism. In turn, he placed his large family in a good position to prosper and help the country grow.
