= Gostwick baronets =

Extinct baronetcy in the Baronetage of England

The Gostwick Baronetcy, of Willington in the County of Bedford, was a title in the Baronetage of England. It was created on 25 November 1611 for William Gostwick, High Sheriff of Bedfordshire from 1595 to 1596. The fourth Baronet was member of parliament for Bedfordshire. The title became either extinct or dormant on the death of the fifth Baronet in 1766.

== Gostwick baronets, of Willington (1611) ==
- Sir William Gostwick, 1st Baronet (1565–1615)
- Sir Edward Gostwick, 2nd Baronet (1588–1630)
- Sir Edward Gostwick, 3rd Baronet (1619–1671)
- Sir William Gostwick, 4th Baronet (1650–1720)
- Sir William Gostwick, 5th Baronet (died 1766)

Baronetage of England
Preceded by Saunderson baronets	Gostwick baronets 25 November 1611	Succeeded by Peshall baronets
