= Edmund Sheffield, 2nd Duke of Buckingham and Normanby =

English nobleman

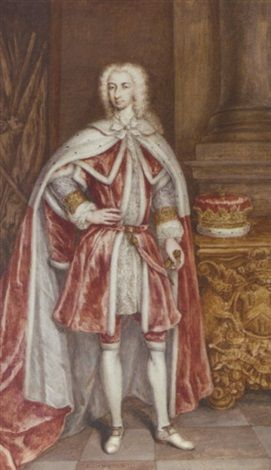
Edmund Sheffield, 2nd Duke of Buckingham and Normanby

Edmund Sheffield, 2nd Duke of Buckingham and Normanby (11 January 1716 – 30 October 1735) was an English nobleman, styled Marquess of Normanby from 1716 to 1721. Through his mother, Catherine Sheffield, he was a grandson of King James II.

The legitimate son of John Sheffield, 1st Duke of Buckingham and Normanby, he succeeded his father in 1721. He matriculated at Queen's College, Oxford in 1732 and died of consumption in Rome in 1735. As he never married and left no issue, the dukedom became extinct upon his death. The family estates, including Normanby Park, devolved upon his illegitimate half brother Charles Herbert Sheffield.

== Notes ==
Peerage of England
Preceded by John Sheffield	Duke of Buckingham and Normanby; 1721–1735	Extinct
