= King Stanley =

King Stanley can refer to:

- Stanley King, a US college president.
- King's Stanley, a village in Gloucestershire, UK.
- Holders of the title King of Mann:
  - John I Stanley of the Isle of Man
  - John II Stanley of the Isle of Man
  - Thomas Stanley, 1st Baron Stanley
  - Thomas Stanley, 1st Earl of Derby
