= Edmund Sheffield, 1st Earl of Mulgrave =

British peer and Member of Parliament

The Earl of Mulgrave
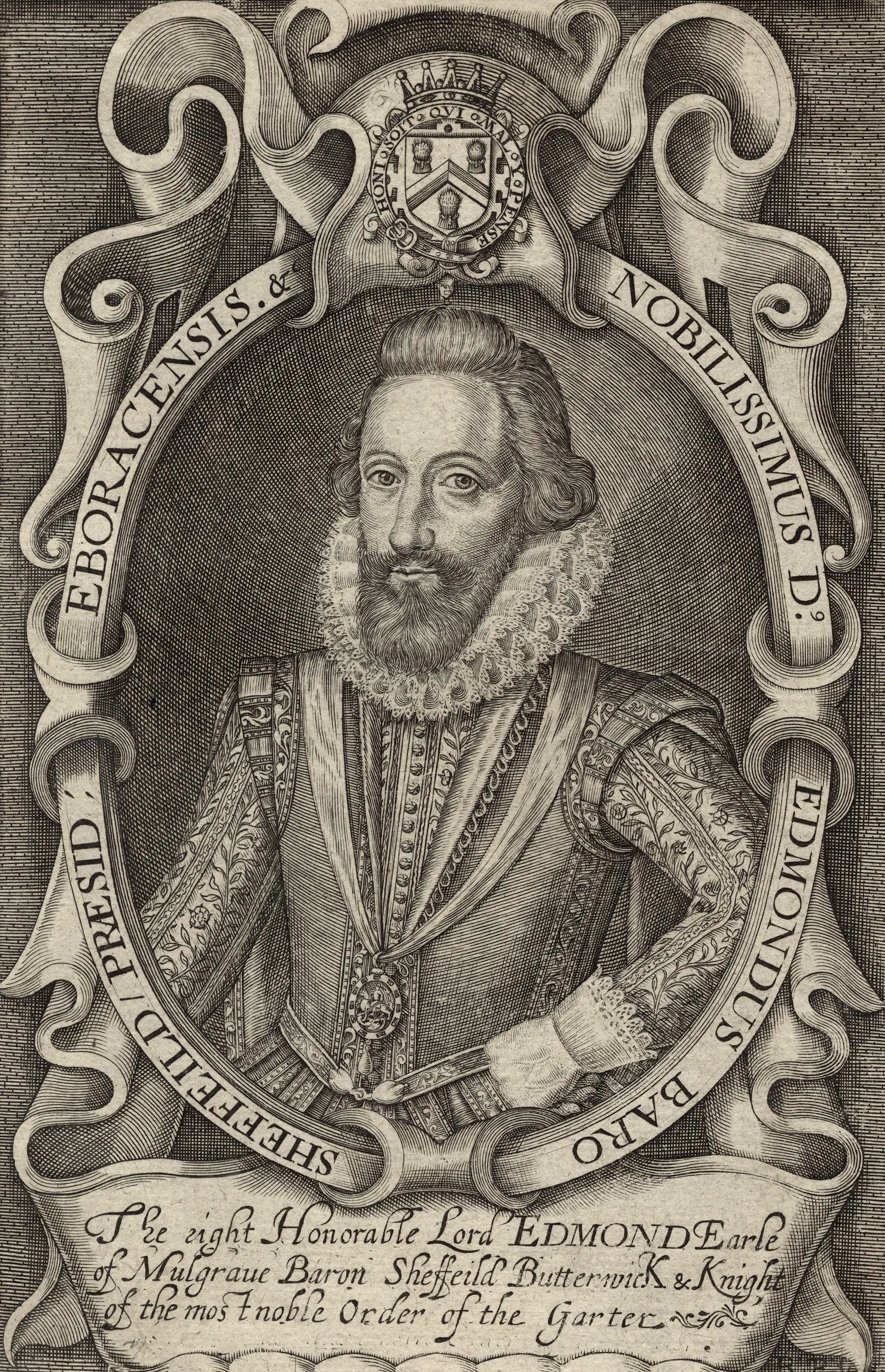
- Engraving by Renold Elstracke, early 17th century

Vice-Admiral of Yorkshire
- In office 1604 – 6 October 1646

President of the North
- In office 19 September 1603 – 1619

Lord Lieutenant of Yorkshire
- In office 1 August 1603 – 1619

Governor of Brill
- In office 1598–1599

Personal details
- Born: December 7, 1565 Oxford
- Died: October 6, 1646 (aged 80) Butterwick House, Hammersmith
- Resting place: St Paul's Church, Hammersmith
- Spouses: Ursula Tyrwhitt; Mariana Irwin
- Relations: Elizabeth Sheffield (sister); Edmund Sheffield, 2nd Earl of Mulgrave (grandson); Sir Thomas Fairfax (grandson); Sir William Fairfax (grandson)
- Children: 22, see below
- Parents: John Sheffield, 2nd Baron Sheffield; Douglas Howard
- Education: Christ Church, Oxford
- Occupation: Politician

Captain Edmund Sheffield, 1st Earl of Mulgrave, 3rd Baron Sheffield, KG (7 December 1565 – 6 October 1646) was an English peer and member of parliament, who served as Lord Lieutenant of Yorkshire from 1603 to 1619 and Vice-Admiral of Yorkshire from 1604 to 1646. He was created Earl of Mulgrave in 1626.

== Early life ==
Edmund Sheffield was born on 7 December 1565 to John Sheffield, 2nd Baron Sheffield and Douglas Howard, daughter of William Howard, 1st Baron Howard of Effingham.

Sheffield's grandfather, Sir Edmund Sheffield, a second cousin of Henry VIII, was raised to the Peerage in 1547 as Baron Sheffield of Butterwick, and was murdered in the streets of Norwich during Kett's Rebellion in 1549.

Sheffield was educated at Christ Church, Oxford from 1574 to 1579.

== Career ==
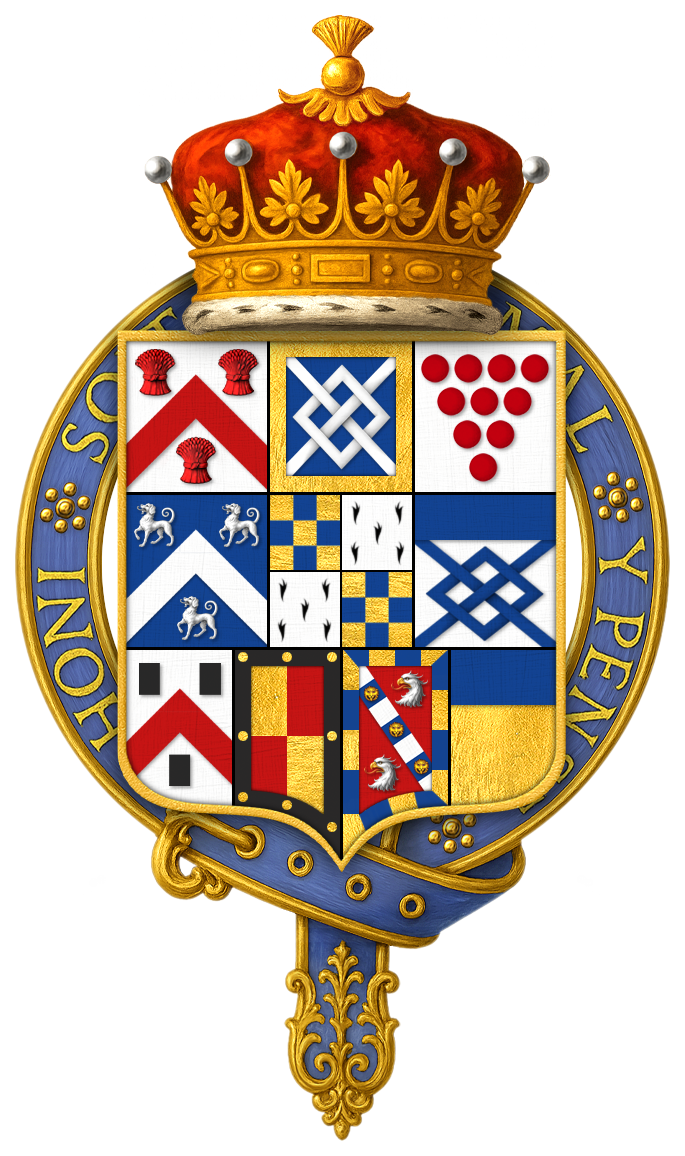
Quartered Arms of Sir Edmund Sheffield, 1st Earl of Mulgrave, KG

In 1582, Sheffield was commanded by Queen Elizabeth I to accompany the Duke of Anjou on his return voyage to the European mainland. Sheffield later served as a volunteer in the Netherlands in 1585.

Sheffield served under the command of his maternal uncle, Charles Howard, 2nd Baron Howard of Effingham, against the Spanish Armada in 1588, captaining the "Victory", "Dreadnought and "White Bear" (also known as the "White Rose"). On 25 July 1588, Sheffield was knighted by for valiant services in the Anglo-Spanish War (1585–1604).

For his services, Queen Elizabeth I granted Sheffield in 1591 the Manor of Mulgrave in Yorkshire, part of the forfeited estate of Sir Francis Bigod. On 21 April 1593, Sheffield was made a Knight of the Most Noble Order of the Garter by Queen Elizabeth I. Sheffield later served in the Nine Years' War.

On 13 January 1598, Sheffield was appointed Governor of Brill, Holland.

Sheffield requested appointment to the presidency of the Council of the North under Queen Elizabeth I but was unsuccessful. Under King James I, Sheffield was made Lord Lieutenant of Yorkshire on 1 August 1603 and President of the North on 19 September 1603. Sheffield held both posts until 1619 when he resigned to please the Spanish ambassador, having executed a Catholic priest without the leave of King James I.

Sheffield took an active interest in the colonialisation of the United States, causing him financial difficulty. Sheffield joined the Virginia Company on 23 May 1609 and the New England Company on 3 November 1620. On 1 June 1621, he was one of the signatories to the first Plymouth patent.

Sheffield was made 1st Earl of Mulgrave on 5 February 1626 following the coronation of Charles I of England. However, he took the side of the Parliament in the English Civil War as one of the twelve peers who signed the petition of 28 August 1640.

Due to his age, Sheffield was not able to attend the House of Lords consistently, however his proxy vote allowed his grandson Sir Thomas Fairfax to be commissioned Captain-General of the New Model Army in 1645.

== Personal life ==
Sheffield married Ursula Tyrwhitt before 13 November 1581, daughter of Sir Robert Tyrwhite of Kettleby and Elizabeth Oxenbridge. They had six sons and eleven daughters:

- Charles Sheffield
- Sir John Sheffield
- Edmund Sheffield
- William Sheffield
- Phillip Sheffield
- George Sheffield
- Mary Sheffield, wife of Ferdinando Fairfax, 2nd Lord Fairfax of Cameron and mother of Sir Thomas Fairfax
- Magdalen Sheffield
- Elizabeth Sheffield
- Tryphena Sheffield
- Dorothy Sheffield
- Douglas Sheffield
- Margaret Sheffield
- Ursula Sheffield
- Sarah Sheffield
- Anne Sheffield
- Frances Sheffield, wife of Sir Philip Fairfax of Steeton and mother of William Fairfax

Ursula died in 1619. Due to financial difficulties, Sheffield set out to marry a rich wife.

On 4 March 1619, Sheffield married Mariana Irwin (or Irvine), the 16 year old daughter of his dancing master Sir William Irvine (or Urwin), a Scottish courtier who was a Gentleman Usher to Prince Henry and Charles I of England. They had three sons and two daughters:

- Captain James Sheffield
- Colonel Thomas Sheffield
- Robert Sheffield
- Margaret Sheffield
- Sarah Sheffield

== Death and legacy ==
Sheffield died on 6 October 1646 at Butterwick House in Hammersmith. He was buried in St Pauls, Hammersmith in a tomb of black and white marble 7 feet (2.1 m) long, 3 feet (0.91 m) high and 3 feet (0.91 m) over, defended with iron rails, where a monument to his memory was erected by his wife Mariana, Countess of Mulgrave.

Sheffield was succeeded by his grandson, Edmund Sheffield, 2nd Earl of Mulgrave, son of Sir John Sheffield.

Sheffield's Garter stall plate is visible in St. George’s Chapel at Windsor Castle.

== Ancestry ==
Ancestors of Edmund Sheffield, 1st Earl of Mulgrave

16. Sir Robert Sheffield
8. Sir Robert Sheffield
17. Helen Delves
4. Edmund Sheffield, 1st Baron Sheffield
18. George Stanley, 9th Baron Strange
9. Jane Stanley
19. Joan le Strange, 9th Baroness Strange
2. John Sheffield, 2nd Baron Sheffield
20. John de Vere
10. John de Vere, 15th Earl of Oxford
21. Alice Kilrington
5. Anne de Vere
22. Edward Trussell
11. Elizabeth Trussell
23. Margaret Kene
1. Edmund Sheffield, 1st Earl of Mulgrave
24. John Howard, 1st Duke of Norfolk
12. Thomas Howard, 2nd Duke of Norfolk
25. Katherine Moleyns
6. William Howard, 1st Baron Howard of Effingham
26. Hugh Tilney of Skirbeck
13. Agnes Tilney
27. Eleanor Tailboys
3. Douglas Howard
28.
14. Sir Thomas Gamage
29.
7. Margaret Gamage
30. Sir John St. John of Bletsoe
15. Margaret St. John
31.

Political offices
Preceded by The Lord Burghley	Lord Lieutenant of Yorkshire; President of the Council of the North; 1603–1619	Succeeded by The Lord Scrope of Bolton
Preceded by Sir John Stanhope	Vice-Admiral of Yorkshire; 1604–1646	Succeeded by The Earl of Mulgrave
Peerage of England
New creation	Earl of Mulgrave; 1626–1646	Succeeded by Edmund Sheffield
Preceded by John Sheffield	Baron Sheffield; 1568–1646	Succeeded by Edmund Sheffield
