= Edmund Sheffield, 1st Baron Sheffield =

English peer (1521–1549)

1st Baron Sheffield
- In office 16 February 1547 – 19 July 1549
- Appointed by: King Edward VI
- Succeeded by: John Sheffield, 2nd Baron Sheffield

Personal details
- Born: November 22, 1521 Butterwick, Lincolnshire, England
- Died: August 1, 1549 (aged 27) Norwich Cathedral, Norwich, Norfolk, England
- Resting place: St Martin at Palace, Norwich
- Spouse: Anne de Vere (before 1538–1549)
- Relations: Sir Robert Sheffield (grandfather); Edmund Sheffield, 1st Earl of Mulgrave (grandson)
- Children: Eleanor Sheffield; John Sheffield, 2nd Baron Sheffield; Robert Sheffield; Frances Sheffield; Elizabeth Sheffield
- Parents: Sir Robert Sheffield; Jane Stanley

Edmund Sheffield, 1st Baron Sheffield, of Butterwick (22 November 1521 – 1 August 1549) was an English nobleman who died in Kett's Rebellion.

== Early life ==
Edmund Sheffield was born on 22 November 1521 in Butterwick, Lincolnshire to Sir Robert Sheffield (died 15 November 1531, son of Sir Robert Sheffield and Helen Delves) and his second wife Jane Stanley, daughter of George Stanley, 9th Baron Strange and Joan le Strange, 9th Baroness Strange. Through his mother, he was a second cousin once removed of the reigning English monarch, King Henry VIII.

Following his father's death in 1531, Sheffield's wardship was granted to George Boleyn, Viscount Rochford, the brother of King Henry VIII's second wife, Anne Boleyn. Rochford and Boleyn were both executed in 1536.

On 2 January 1538, Sheffield's wardship passed to John De Vere, 15th Earl of Oxford. Sheffield was sent up to Thomas Cromwell and became one of his gentlemen. Sheffield had a troubled youth and was in prison by July 1538 but was soon released.

On 16 Feb 1547, by the will of King Henry VIII, Sheffield was raised to the Peerage of England as Baron Sheffield of Butterwick at the beginning of the reign of King Edward VI.

== Personal life ==
Sheffield married Anne de Vere, daughter of his guardian John de Vere, 15th Earl of Oxford, before 31 January 1538, and by her had two sons and three daughters:

- Eleanor Sheffield (c. 1537) married Denzel Holles
- John Sheffield, 2nd Baron Sheffield (c. 1538 – 10 December 1568) married Douglas Howard
- Robert Sheffield (c. 1540)
- Frances Sheffield (c. 1542) married Thomas Metham
- Elizabeth Sheffield (c. 1546)

Sheffield was a poet of the same generation as the Henry Howard, Earl of Surrey. Although none of his poetry has survived, he was praised by Fuller: "Great his skill in music, who wrote a book of sonnetts according to the Italian fashion".

== Death ==
In 1549, Sheffield accompanied William Parr, 1st Marquess of Northampton on an expedition to quell Kett's Rebellion in Norfolk. On 1 August 1549, during a pitched battle at Pockthorpe Gate for control of Norwich, Sheffield fell from his horse and was captured by an armed mob. The rebels refused the lord's request to spare his life in return for a promised ransom and Sheffield was fatally struck by a butcher, reputedly named Fulke. Sheffield's death was seen as a turning point in the fight. With the loss of a senior commander and his army being broken up in street fighting, Northampton ordered a retreat.

Sheffield left behind a young son, John Sheffield, 2nd Baron Sheffield, who became a ward of King Edward VI. In recognition of his father's loyalty to the crown and sacrifice, John Sheffield was granted an annual annuity and in November 1550 the right to marry freely without having to pay the usual fees or fines to the Court of Wards and Liveries.

Sheffield was buried at St Martin at Palace, Norwich. A plaque near Norwich Cathedral now marks the location of Sheffield's murder.

== Ancestry ==
Ancestors of Edmund Sheffield, 1st Baron Sheffield

16.
8. Sir Robert Sheffield
17.
4. Sir Robert Sheffield
18. Alexander Lownde
9. Jane Lounde
19.
2. Sir Robert Sheffield
20.
10. Sir John Delves
21.
5. Helen Delves
22.
11.
23.
1. Edmund Sheffield, 1st Baron Sheffield
24. Thomas Stanley, 1st Baron Stanley
12. Thomas Stanley, 1st Earl of Derby
25. Joan Goushill
6. George Stanley, 9th Baron Strange
26. Richard Neville, 5th Earl of Salisbury
13. Lady Eleanor Neville
27. Alice Montacute, 5th Countess of Salisbury
3. Jane Stanley
28. Richard le Strange, 7th Baron Strange
14. John le Strange, 8th Baron Strange
29.
7. Joan le Strange, 9th Baroness Strange
30. Richard Woodville, 1st Earl Rivers
15. Jacquetta Woodville
31. Jacquetta of Luxembourg

Peerage of England
New creation	Baron Sheffield; 1547–1549	Succeeded by John Sheffield
