= Lord Lieutenant of Yorkshire =

List of Lord Lieutenants of the region of Yorkshire

This is a list of people who served as Lord Lieutenant of Yorkshire.

== List of Lord Lieutenants ==
Lord Lieutenant	Portrait	Birth	Death
Henry Hastings, 3rd Earl of Huntingdon; 1586–1595	Henry Hastings	1536; Ashby-de-la-Zouch son of Francis Hastings, 2nd Earl of Huntingdon and Katherine Pole	14 December 1595; York aged 59
Thomas Cecil, 2nd Baron Burghley; 1599–1603	Thomas Cecil	5 May 1542; Cambridge son of William Cecil, 1st Baron Burghley and Mary Cheke	8 February 1623; London aged 81
Edmund Sheffield, 3rd Baron Sheffield; 1603–1619	Edmund Sheffield	7 December 1565; Oxford son of John Sheffield, 2nd Baron Sheffield of Butterwick and Douglas Howard	6 October 1646 aged 80
Emanuel Scrope, 1st Earl of Sunderland; 1619–1628	Emanuel Scrope	1 August 1584; Hunsdon son of Thomas Scrope, 10th Baron Scrope of Bolton and Philadelphia Carey	30 May 1630 aged 46
Thomas Wentworth, 1st Earl of Strafford; 1628–1641	Thomas Wentworth	13 April 1593; London son of William Wentworth of Wentworth Woodhouse and Anne Atkins	12 May 1641; Tower Hill aged 48
Thomas Savile, 1st Viscount Savile; 1641	Thomas Savile	14 September 1591	1658 aged 67
Robert Devereux, 3rd Earl of Essex; 1641–1642	Robert Devereux	11 January 1591 son of Robert Devereux, 2nd Earl of Essex and Frances Walsingham	14 September 1646 aged 55

From 1642 until 1660 the position was vacant, however after the Restoration, a separate lieutenant was appointed for each of the three ridings; see Lord Lieutenant of the East Riding of Yorkshire, Lord Lieutenant of the North Riding of Yorkshire and Lord Lieutenant of the West Riding of Yorkshire.
