= Lord of the Isle of Man =

Lord of the Isle of Man may refer to:

- pre-1504, King of Mann
- post-1504, Lord of Mann
