= Sir John Stanley (died 1437) =

Arms of Stanley: Argent, on a bend azure three buck's heads cabossed or

Sir John Stanley (c. 1386–1437) was Knight, Sheriff of Anglesey, Constable of Carnarvon, Justice of Chester, Steward of Macclesfield and titular King of Mann, the second of that name.

== Biography ==
His father Sir John Stanley I, Lord Lieutenant of Ireland, had been granted the tenure of the Isle of Man, to him and his heirs, by Henry IV, and the younger Sir John succeeded to the Kingdom in 1414. He also held the office of Steward of Macclesfield, Cheshire.

He twice visited the Island to put down rebellions (1417 and 1422) and was also responsible for putting the laws of the Island into writing. A brief description is given in Manx Notebook (vol iii p1-4).

A. W. Moore, a Manx antiquary and Speaker of the House of Keys, appraised him as follows:

He may justly be considered an enlightened and upright ruler, much in advance of his time. He caused the ancient laws and constitutions of his little kingdom to be reduced to writing, he humbled the overbearing ecclesiastical authorities, and, after he had practically concentrated all power into his own hands, he wisely conceded a representative form of government.

He purchased the Advowson of Rectory of Winwick, Cheshire from the Nostell Priory, Wakefield in 1433 - from this time onwards, this church, adjacent to his property, was to have close links with the Stanley family.

== Family ==
He married Elizabeth Harrington, daughter of Sir Nicholas Harrington. One of his sons was Sir Thomas Stanley, 1st Baron Stanley, and a grandson was Thomas Stanley, 1st Earl of Derby.

Head of State of the Isle of Man
Preceded by John Stanley	King of Mann; 1414–1437	Succeeded by Thomas Stanley, 1st Baron Stanley
