= Thomas Englefield =

English politician (died 1514)

Sir Thomas Englefield (also known as Inglefield) (c. 1455 – 3 April 1514) was Speaker of the House of Commons of England in two sessions, 1497 for Henry VII and 1510 for Henry VIII.

He was born, probably in Englefield in Berkshire, around 1455, the son of John Englefield whose family had been Lords of the Manor there for many generations. His father died while he was quite young and his grandfather, Robert Englefield, had him educated in law at the Middle Temple.

He was created a Knight of the Bath on the marriage of Prince Arthur in 1501. He held land on the Welsh border, notably in Worcestershire where he became a magistrate (JP) in 1493. He was returned to Parliament as knight of the shire (MP) for Berkshire in 1497 and 1510 and on both occasions elected Speaker of the House.

He had married Margery, daughter of Sir Richard Danvers with whom he had two sons, Richard, who died young and Thomas, his heir and the father of the Catholic politician, Sir Francis Englefield.

| Preceded by Sir Robert Drury | Speaker of the House of Commons; 1496–1497 | Succeeded by Edmund Dudley |
| Preceded by Edmund Dudley | Speaker of the House of Commons; 1509 | Succeeded by Sir Robert Sheffield |
