= Robert Sheffield =

English politician (died 1518)

Sir Robert Sheffield MP
- Argent a chevron between three garbs Gules.

Speaker of the House of Commons
- In office 1512–1513
- Preceded by: Sir Thomas Englefield
- Succeeded by: Thomas Nevill

Member of Parliament for the Lincolnshire
- In office 1512–1515

Member of Parliament for the City of London
- In office 1495–1508

Recorder of London
- In office 1495–1508

Personal details
- Born: before 1462 Butterwick, Lincolnshire, England
- Died: 10 August 1518 Tower of London
- Resting place: Austin Friars, London
- Spouses: Ellen Delves; Anne Barley
- Relations: Edmund Sheffield, 1st Baron Sheffield (grandson)
- Children: Jane Sheffield; Sir Robert Sheffield; Edward Sheffield; Margaret Sheffield; Anne Sheffield; Elizabeth Sheffield; Bridget Sheffield
- Parents: Sir Robert Sheffield; Jane Lounde

Sir Robert Sheffield MP (before 1462 – 10 August 1518) was an English lawyer and member of parliament. He was Speaker of the House of Commons between 1512 and 1513.

== Early life ==
Robert Sheffield was born before 1462 in Butterwick, Lincolnshire to Sir Robert Sheffield MP (1432 – 18 August 1502) of South Cave, Yorkshire and Jane Lounde, the daughter and coheir of Alexander Lownde of Butterwick, Lincolnshire.

Sheffield was educated in law at Inner Temple.

== Career ==
Sheffield served as Recorder of London from at least 21 September 1495 to April 1508 to 1508, and was thus an ex officio Member of Parliament for the City of London in 1495, 1497 and 1504. Bernard Andreas states that Sheffield resigned the recordership in April 1508.

Sheffield held several governmental positions and commissions in Lincolnshire, Yorkshire and London, including commissioner of sewers in Lincolnshire from 1485 until his death, commissioner of oyer and terminer in London in 1495 and 1503, commissioner for benevolence in 1500, commissioner for subsidy in Lincolnshire in 1504, 1512, 1514 and 1515, and in London in 1504.

Sheffield held several stewardships, including Steward of the Bishop of Durham's liberty of Howden, Yorkshire from March 1493, Steward of the manor of Stoke Bardolph and others in Nottinghamshire from February 1508 until his death and Steward of the manor of Kirton, Lincolnshire and crown lands in Kingston-upon-Hull and elsewhere in Yorkshire from 20 July 1509 until his death.

Sheffield served as Justice of the Peace in Lincolnshire from 1495 – 7 and 1510-16 or later, and in Nottinghamshire from 1511 to 1516 or later.

Sheffield served was a commander at the Battle of Blackheath during the Cornish Rebellion of 1497, and was knighted by Henry VII on 17 June 1497 after the battle.

Sheffield was joint keeper of Lincoln Castle from 10 February 1501 until his death. In 1508, Sheffield was listed as a "councillor".

Sheffield became Governor of the Inner Temple in 1511, likely serving until his death.

Sheffield was chosen Knight of the Shire for Lincolnshire in 1512 and 1513. During these years, he served as Speaker of the House of Commons.

By 1516, Sheffield served as Custos rotulorum (keeper of the rolls) for Lincolnshire (Lindsey).

== Personal life ==
By 1485, Sheffield married Ellen Delves, the daughter and heir of Sir John Delves of Doddington, Cheshire. They had two sons and five daughters:

- Robert Sheffield (c. 1483 – 1532), married Jane Stanley, daughter of George Stanley, 9th Baron Strange, and sister of Thomas Stanley, 2nd Earl of Derby, and father of Edmund Sheffield, 1st Baron Sheffield
- Jane Sheffield (c. 1484 – 1528)
- Edward Sheffield (born 1485)
- Margaret Sheffield (born c. 1493)
- Anne Sheffield (born 1489)
- Elizabeth Sheffield (born 1489)
- Bridget Sheffield (born 1494)

After his first wife's death in or after 1509, Sheffield married secondly Anne Barley or Barlee (d. 1557 or 1558), the daughter of William Barley, of Albury, Hertfordshire. After Sheffield's death in 1518 his widow married secondly Sir John Grey of Blisworth, Northamptonshire, a younger son of Thomas Grey, 1st Marquess of Dorset by his second wife, Cecily Bonville, and thirdly Sir Richard Clement, of Ightham Mote, Kent. Anne (née Barlee) left a will dated 1 October 1557, proved 7 May 1558.

== Death ==
In 1515, Sheffield helped Cardinal Wolsey in drafting legislation but later gave lead to anti-clerical forces in the House, earning him the Cardinal's enmity. In 1516, he was charged with negligence as a justice of the peace and was summoned before the Star Chamber but negotiated a pardon. Six months later he was incarcerated in the Tower of London after complaining against Cardinal Wolsey, and brought before the Star Chamber again, and this time asked the King for mercy. However the pardon was revoked and Sheffield died in the Tower of London on 10 August 1518.

Sheffield was buried in the Augustinian church (Blackfriars), London. His will is in Testamenta Vetusta by Nicholas Harris Nicolas (p. 555).

== See also ==
- Sheffield baronets, including other persons called "Sir Robert Sheffield"

Political offices
Preceded by Sir Thomas Englefield	Speaker of the House of Commons; 1512–1513	Succeeded by Thomas Nevill
