= John Sheffield, 2nd Baron Sheffield =

English nobleman (c. 1538 – 1568)

John Sheffield, 2nd Baron Sheffield KB
- Baron Sheffield
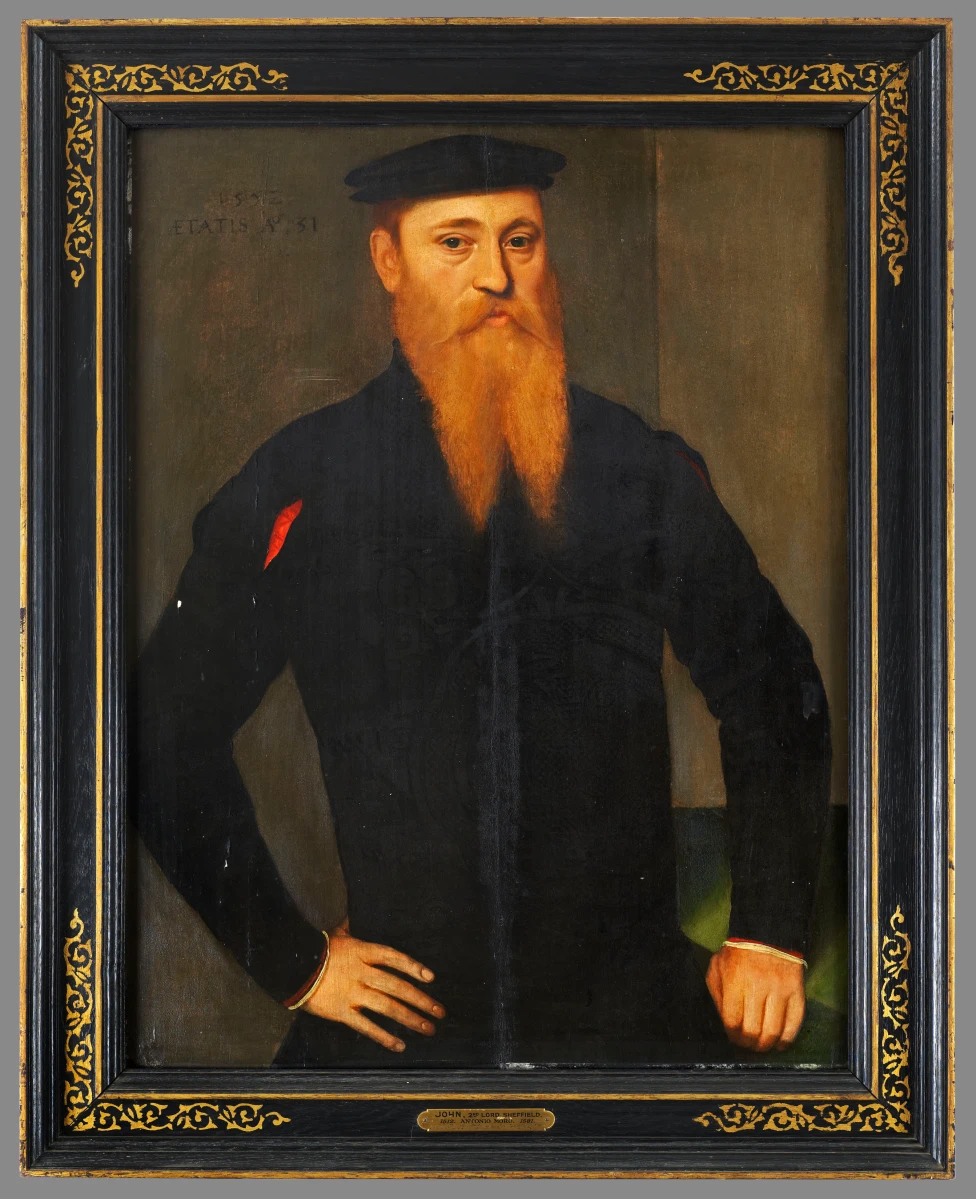
- Predecessor: Edmund Sheffield, 1st Baron Sheffield
- Successor: Edmund Sheffield, 3rd Baron Sheffield
- Born: c. 1538; Butterwick, Lincolnshire, England
- Died: 10 December 1568 (aged 29–30)
- Spouse: Douglas Howard
- Issue: Elizabeth Sheffield; Edmund Sheffield, 1st Earl of Mulgrave
- Parents: Edmund Sheffield, 1st Baron Sheffield; Lady Anne De Vere

John Sheffield, 2nd Baron Sheffield KB, of Butterwick (c. 1538 – 10 December 1568) was an English nobleman.

== Early life ==
John Sheffield was born c. 1538 in Butterwick, Lincolnshire to Edmund Sheffield, 1st Baron Sheffield and Lady Anne De Vere, daughter of John de Vere, 15th Earl of Oxford.

== Career ==
On 31 July 1549, following his father's murder in Norwich during Kett's Rebellion, Sheffield, then aged 11, succeeded to the barony. Sheffield became a ward of King Edward VI and in November 1550 was granted a privilege to marry freely when he became of age, without having to pay the usual fees or fines to the Court of Wards and Liveries. As a minor in the King's guardianship, Sheffield was granted an annual annuity of 49 pounds, 2 shillings and 6 pence.

On 13 January 1559 Sheffield was made Knight of the Bath at the coronation of Queen Elizabeth I. On 8 June 1559 Queen Elizabeth I granted Sheffield license take possession of his inherited lands and their profits from when he turned 21.

Sheffield was admitted to Gray's Inn in 1561. On 17 November 1565, Sheffield was appointed as a commissioner to investigate a disagreement between the Archbishop of York and his tenants.

== Personal life ==
In c. 1562, Sheffield married Douglas Howard (then aged 17), daughter of William Howard, 1st Baron Howard of Effingham, and Margaret Gamage. They had two children:

1. Elizabeth Sheffield (died November 1600) married Thomas Butler, 10th Earl of Ormonde
2. Edmund Sheffield, 1st Earl of Mulgrave (7 December 1565 – 6 October 1646) married (1) Ursulla Tyrwhitt (2) Mariana Irwin

== Death ==
Sheffield died on 10 December 1568 aged 30 of poor health. His will, dated December 1568, which left nothing to his widow Douglas Howard, was proved on 31 January 1589.

After his death, Douglas Howard became the lover of Robert Dudley, 1st Earl of Leicester and the favourite of Queen Elizabeth I. There were rumours that Howard and Dudley were engaged in an affair while Sheffield was alive, when Dudley visited Belvoir Castle in Leicestershire with Queen Elizabeth I and were discovered, enraging Sheffield.

The anonymous author of Leicester’s Commonwealth, the 1584 pamphlet attacking Dudley, suggested that while Sheffield's official cause of death was of natural causes (illness), there were rumours his death was the result of foul play, possibly orchestrated by Leicester to remove the obstacle to his relationship with Howard:

"Long after this, [Leicester] fell in love with the Lady Sheffield, whom I signified before, & then also had he the same fortune to have her husband die quickly with an extreme rheum in his head (as it was given out), but as other say of an artificial catarrh that stopped his breath."

Peerage of England
Preceded by Edmund Sheffield	Baron Sheffield; 1549–1568	Succeeded by Edmund Sheffield
