= Noble and royal titles of the Isle of Man =

The following articles detail the noble and royal titles associated with the Isle of Man, a self-governing British Crown dependency in the Irish Sea between the islands of Great Britain and Ireland:

- King of Mann and the Isles (defunct)
- King of Mann (defunct)
- Lord of Mann

== See also ==
- Bishop of Sodor and Man
