= William Stanley (soldier) =

English soldier

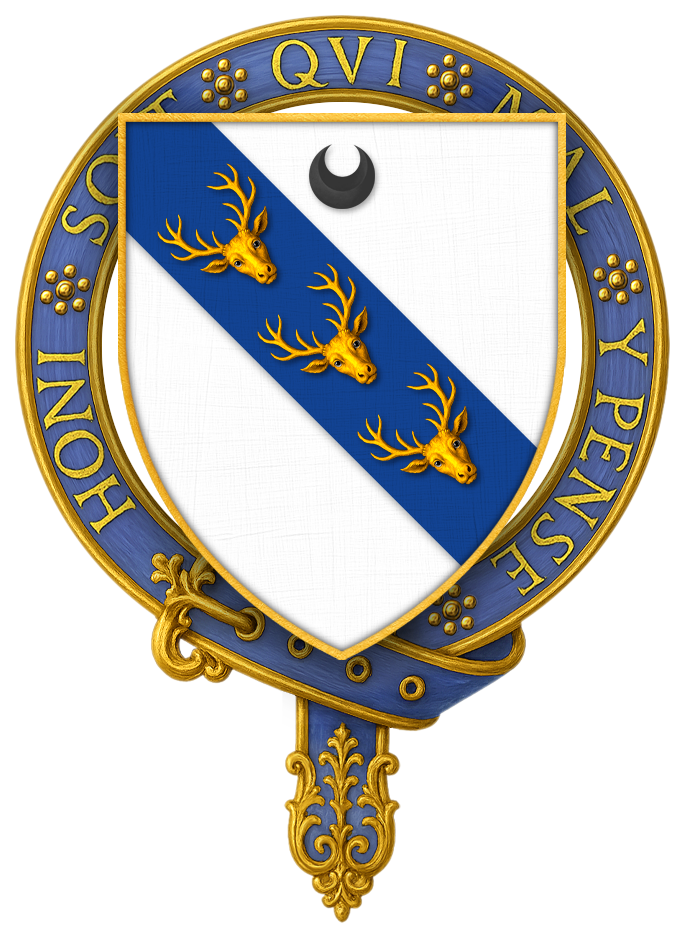
Arms of Sir William Stanley, KG

Sir William Stanley KG (c. 1435 – 16 February 1495) was an English soldier and the younger brother of Thomas Stanley, 1st Earl of Derby. Stanley fought with his troops in several battles of the Wars of the Roses.

== Private life ==
Holt Castle

Born at Lathom, Lancashire, Sir William was the younger son of Thomas Stanley, 1st Baron Stanley. In 1465 he married Joan Beaumont (d. 1469), daughter of John Beaumont, 1st Viscount Beaumont, and widow of John, Lord Lovel. They had three children: William, Joan and Catherine. Following the execution of her second husband the Earl of Worcester, Sir William married secondly, c. 1471, Elizabeth Hopton (d. 1498), daughter of Thomas Hopton with whom he had a daughter, Jane Stanley who married Sir John Warburton, Knight of Arley Hall. He is known as Sir William Stanley of Holt, Wrexham, from one of the castles he was granted by Richard III named Holt Castle.

== Career ==
William Stanley fought on the Yorkist side at the Battle of Blore Heath in 1459, whereas his elder brother Thomas, Lord Stanley had raised troops by the commission of the Lancastrian Crown but refrained from committing his forces on either side. Attainted in 1459, he fled into exile, but returned to fight for the Yorkists in 1461 at Towton. In 1465 he was granted the Skipton lands and castle of the dispossessed Lancastrian Cliffords. Following the Battle of Tewkesbury in 1471, it was he who captured Queen Margaret of Anjou, who led the Lancastrian faction, and he was made a Knight Banneret by Edward IV. In 1483 he was made Chief Justice of North Wales. Richard III, shortly after becoming king, rewarded Sir William by granting him land in North Wales.

Having been loyal to Richard, Stanley nevertheless changed sides in 1485, and suddenly supported the Lancastrian Henry Tudor's bid for the throne. Stanley is best known for his action at the Battle of Bosworth Field, where he decisively attacked Richard's forces, helping to secure Henry's victory. This was in contrast to the non-committal attitude of his elder brother, Henry's stepfather, who was inhibited by the fact that Richard held his son hostage. In gratitude for his timely intervention, the now Henry VII bestowed many favours on Sir William, including the post of Lord Chamberlain and Chamberlain of the Exchequer.

However, in 1495 Stanley was convicted of treason for his support of the impostor pretender Perkin Warbeck. Though the evidence was circumstantial, he admitted the offence in the hope that through a full confession he would escape execution. The King, partly to avoid antagonising his mother and stepfather, was at first inclined to spare Sir William's life. Yet ultimately the King feared that showing clemency would endanger his position by encouraging further conspirators. Consequently, Sir William was condemned to death, and a few days later, beheaded.

Letitia Elizabeth Landon's poetical illustration Sir William Stanley, tells his story.

== In popular culture ==
Sir William Stanley appears as a character in three episodes of the 1972 BBC television series about the reign of Henry VII, The Shadow of the Tower, played by John Franklyn-Robbins.

In the 2017 Starz miniseries The White Princess, Stanley is portrayed by Guy Williams.

In 2024, Stanley was portrayed by Tyler Dobbs in the theatre production “Richard, My Richard” performed at The Northern Shakespeare Playhouse.

== Notes ==
Political offices
Preceded by Francis Lovell, 1st Viscount Lovell	Lord Chamberlain; 1485–1494	Succeeded by Giles Daubeney, 1st Baron Daubeney
