= William Howard, 1st Baron Howard of Effingham =

English diplomat and military officer (1510–1573)

The Right Honourable The Lord Howard of Effingham
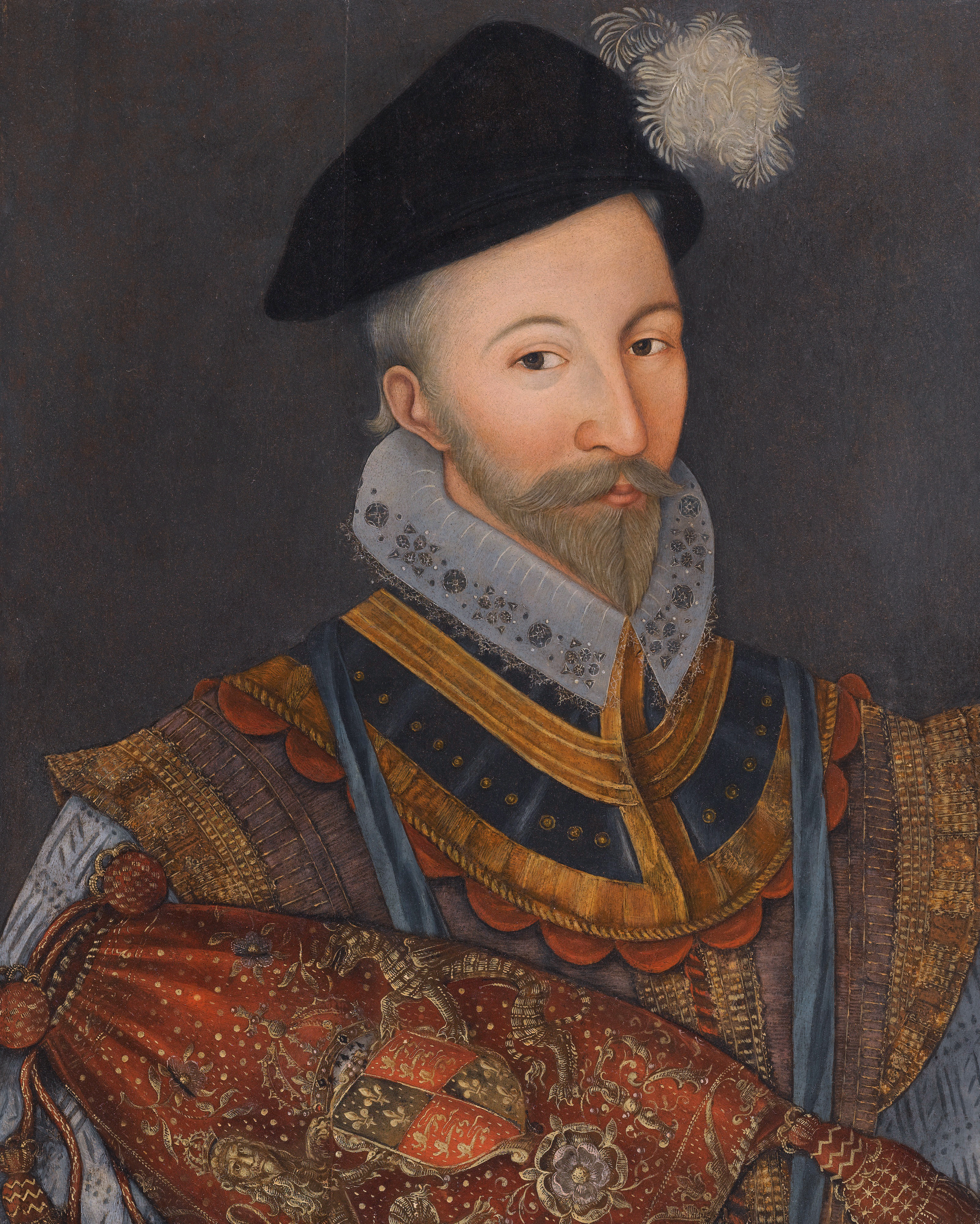
- Portrait of Effingham
- Born: 1510
- Died: 12 January 1573 (aged 62–63)
- Noble family: House of Howard-Effingham
- Spouses: Katherine Broughton; Margaret Gamage
- Issue: Agnes Paulet, Marchioness of Winchester; Charles Howard, 1st Earl of Nottingham; Sir William Howard; Edward Howard; Henry Howard; Margaret Howard-married Richard Allen Hinson; Douglas Sheffield, Lady Sheffield; Mary Sutton, Lady Dudley; Frances Seymour, Countess of Hertford; Martha, Lady Bourchier; Katherine Howard
- Parents: Thomas Howard, 2nd Duke of Norfolk; Agnes Tilney

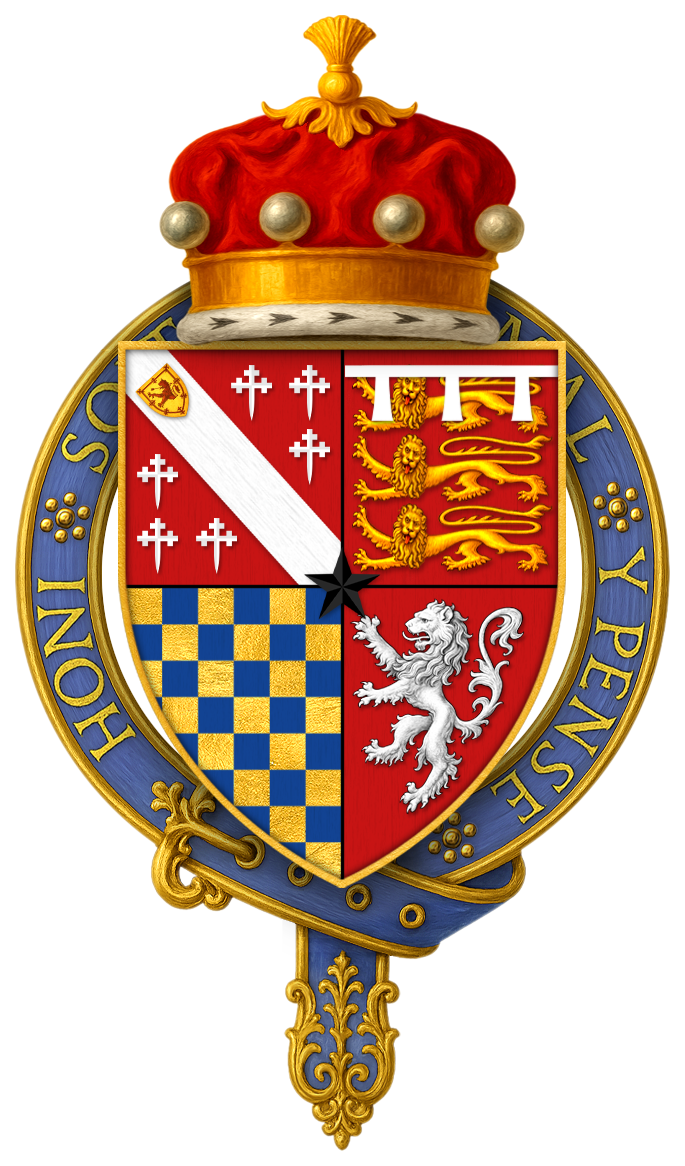
Arms of Sir William Howard, 1st Baron Howard of Effingham, KG

William Howard, 1st Baron Howard of Effingham (c. 1510 – 12 January 1573) was an English diplomat and military officer. He served four monarchs, Henry VIII, Edward VI, Mary I and Elizabeth I, in various official capacities, most notably on diplomatic missions and as Lord Admiral and Lord Chamberlain of the Household.

== Early life ==
William Howard was born about 1510, the ninth son of Thomas Howard, Earl of Surrey, later 2nd Duke of Norfolk. He was the eldest son of Surrey by his second wife, Agnes Tilney. (Note: Howard was thus the half-brother of Thomas Howard, 3rd Duke of Norfolk, the 2nd Duke's eldest son and heir by his first marriage to Agnes Tilney's cousin, Elizabeth Tilney.)

Howard was brought to court at a young age after completing his education at Trinity Hall, Cambridge.

== Embassies ==
In 1531, Howard was sent on an embassy to Scotland by King Henry VIII, and accompanied the King to Boulogne in October 1532. In May 1533, as deputy to his half-brother, Thomas Howard, 3rd Duke of Norfolk, he served as Earl Marshal at the coronation of his niece, Anne Boleyn, the daughter of his half-sister, Elizabeth Boleyn, Countess of Wiltshire. On 10 September 1533, Howard bore the canopy over his great-niece Elizabeth (later Queen Elizabeth I). In 1534, he went to Scotland. His instructions included getting the measurements of James V of Scotland from the Bishop of Aberdeen, Lord High Treasurer of Scotland. Then Howard's tailor would make Henry VIII's nephew a new suit of clothes as a present. Howard would then broach the subject of the two kings meeting in person.

In February 1535, he was sent again to Scotland to invest James V with the Order of the Garter and brought a present of "great horses". Howard met James V at Stirling Castle on Good Friday. They discussed a possible meeting of the two Kings at Newcastle at Michaelmas. Margaret Tudor praised his abilities and wrote that her son James V, "lykkis hym right weill."

In June 1535, he was in France as a member of the English embassy authorized to negotiate with the French Admiral, Philippe de Chabot. In February 1536 he was again in Scotland, this time for the purpose of persuading James V to adopt Henry VIII's religious policy. He returned to Scotland again in April when he heard rumours from Margaret Tudor and others that James V intended to marry his mistress, Margaret Erskine, Lady Lochleven.

He was again in France in 1537 and Francis I gave him a gold chain made by Jean Rousseau of Lyon. On 11 December 1539, he was among those who welcomed King Henry VIII's fourth bride, Anne of Cleves at Calais.

While on an embassy to France in 1541, William Howard was charged with concealing the sexual indiscretions of his young niece, Katherine Howard, Henry VIII's fifth wife, and was recalled to England to stand trial. On 22 December 1541, Howard, his wife, and a number of servants who had been alleged witnesses to the Queen's misconduct were arraigned for misprision of treason, convicted, and sentenced to life imprisonment and loss of goods. He and most of the others were pardoned after Queen Katherine's execution on 13 February 1542.

== Military career ==
In 1544, Howard accompanied the Earl of Hertford's forces in the invasion of Scotland. It was reported that he was hurt in the cheek by an English arrow during fighting on Edinburgh's Royal Mile. In July of that year he took part in the siege of Boulogne. On 27 May 1545, the King's Council ordered Howard to "repayre to serve uppon the sees". Later orders show that he detained several foreign vessels while patrolling the English Channel. In May 1546, he was entrusted with the sum of £12,000 to pay the English army at Calais. In connection with these duties, he was referred to as "vice-admiral" to the then Lord Admiral, Viscount Lisle. When Lisle's attendance was required in May 1546 at negotiations which resulted in the signing of the Treaty of Ardres on 7 June 1546, he turned command of the English fleet over to Howard.

Howard's career received a check in 1547 with the downfall of his half-nephew Henry Howard, Earl of Surrey. However, the setback was temporary. He was an ally of John Dudley, 1st Duke of Northumberland, then Earl of Warwick, in his coup against the Protector Somerset in October 1549, and on 19 March 1551, received the manor of Effingham, Surrey, and other properties by way of reward. On 29 October 1552, Northumberland secured Howard's appointment as Lord Deputy and Governor of Calais, and in the same month he was sworn of the Privy Council. When the young King Edward VI died on 6 July 1553, Howard held Calais for Queen Mary I against the supporters of her rival, Lady Jane Grey.

On 2 January 1554, he was appointed to meet the Spanish ambassadors who had come to London to negotiate a marriage between Queen Mary I and King Philip II of Spain. Wyatt's rebellion broke out on 25 January, and Howard was among those who raised the militia to defend London. On 7 February 1554, he held Ludgate, preventing the rebels from entering the city and leading to their surrender a few hours later. He was appointed to Queen Mary's Privy Council on 3 January 1554, and on 11 March, was created Baron Howard of Effingham. On 20 March 1554, he was granted a patent as Lord Admiral, replacing Lord Clinton. On 9 October of that year, he was made a Knight of the Garter. Around this date, there was a masque at court, featuring mariners' costumes made of gold and silver cloth, which Francis Yaxley thought was Howard's production.

As Lord Admiral, Howard, with a fleet of 28 ships, met King Philip II on his arrival in England in 1555, and in August of that year escorted the King to Flanders. In 1557 Howard's fleet transported a force under the command of the Earl of Pembroke to Calais. Lord Howard's support for the accession of his great-niece, Elizabeth, exposed him to suspicion, although he was never considered disloyal by Queen Mary. In February 1558 Howard's patent as Lord Admiral was revoked, and on 12 February 1558, the office was restored to Lord Clinton. Howard was compensated by a grant of the reversion of the office of Lord Chamberlain of the Household and an annuity of 200 marks, effective the previous September.

== Landholdings ==
Monumental brass of Katherine Broughton, first wife of Lord Howard; St. Mary's Church, Lambeth, Surrey (destroyed in WWII)

Howard inherited a number of manors and estates, some from the Howard family, some through his first wife Katherine, and others by gift of the Crown. These included lands at Broughton in Buckinghamshire; Billeshurst, Bletchingley, Kingswood, Little Bookham and Tillingdown in Surrey; Lowick in Northamptonshire; Shaw-cum-Donnington in Berkshire; and Tottenham in north London.

In 1566, Howard had some financial difficulties, and handed some of his Surrey estates to his great-nephew Thomas, Duke of Norfolk, retaining Little Bookham for his second wife, Margaret.

== Final years ==
After Queen Elizabeth's accession on 17 November 1558, Howard succeeded Edward Hastings as Lord Chamberlain and was appointed to the Privy Council. In early 1559 he was among those who negotiated the Treaty of Cateau-Cambrésis. In August 1564 he accompanied the Queen on a visit to Cambridge, where he was awarded the degree of Master of Arts; on 6 October 1566 he was awarded a similar degree by the University of Oxford. According to McDermott, he was a "near constant attendee at privy council meetings during the 1560s", but by the latter part of 1572 he could no longer discharge his duties as Lord Chamberlain because of ill health, and the Queen appointed his nephew, the Earl of Sussex, to replace him, appointing Howard as Lord Privy Seal. Howard died at Hampton Court Palace on 12 January 1573, and was buried on 29 January at Reigate.

Whitgift School currently stands on the site of the former Howard estate in Croydon.

== Family ==
William Howard married firstly, before 18 June 1531, Katherine (died 23 April 1535), the daughter of John Broughton (died 23 January 1518) of Toddington, Bedfordshire, by Anne Sapcote (died 14 March 1559), the daughter and heir of Sir Guy Sapcote by Margaret Wolston, daughter and heir of Sir Guy Wolston. They had one daughter, Agnes Howard, who married William Paulet, 3rd Marquess of Winchester. Katherine (née Broughton) was buried in the parish church of St Mary at Lambeth, where there is a monument to her memory.

He married secondly, on 29 June 1535, Margaret Gamage (died 1581), the third daughter of Sir Thomas Gamage of Coity, Glamorganshire and his wife, Margaret St John, the half-second cousin of Henry VIII – her paternal grandfather, John, was a half-brother of Margaret Beaufort – and the daughter of Sir John St John of Bletsoe, Bedfordshire, by whom he had four sons and five daughters.

- Charles Howard, 1st Earl of Nottingham
- Sir William Howard of Lingfield his great grandson was Francis Howard, 5th Baron Howard of Effingham
- Edward
- Henry
- Douglas (wife firstly of John Sheffield, 2nd Baron Sheffield of Butterwick, Lincolnshire, secondly, of Sir Edward Stafford of Grafton),
- Mary (wife of Edward Sutton, 4th Baron Dudley, and Richard Mompesson)
- Frances (wife of Edward Seymour, 1st Earl of Hertford)
- Martha (wife of Sir George Bourchier)
- Katherine.

== Notes ==
Political offices
Preceded by Lord Clinton	Lord High Admiral; 1554–1558	Succeeded by Lord Clinton
Preceded by Sir Edward Hastings	Lord Chamberlain of the Household; 1558–1572	Succeeded by The Earl of Sussex
Preceded by Sir Thomas Pope	Custos Rotulorum of Surrey bef. 1562–1573	Succeeded by Lord Clinton
Preceded by Lord Burghley	Lord Privy Seal; 1572–1573	Succeeded by Sir Thomas Smith
Peerage of England
New creation	Baron Howard of Effingham; 1554–1573	Succeeded by Charles Howard
