= George Stanley, 9th Baron Strange =

English nobleman (c. 1460–1503)

The Right Honourable The Lord Strange KG KB
- Born: ca. 1460
- Died: 4–5 December 1503; Derby House, London
- Burial place: London church of St James Garlickhythe
- Spouse: Joan le Strange, 9th Baroness Strange
- Military career
- Allegiance: England

George Stanley, 9th Baron Strange, of Knockin, KG, KB (c. 1460–1503) was an English nobleman and heir apparent of Thomas Stanley, 1st Earl of Derby. He was also a notable soldier in his own right and held a number of senior offices of state.

== Life ==
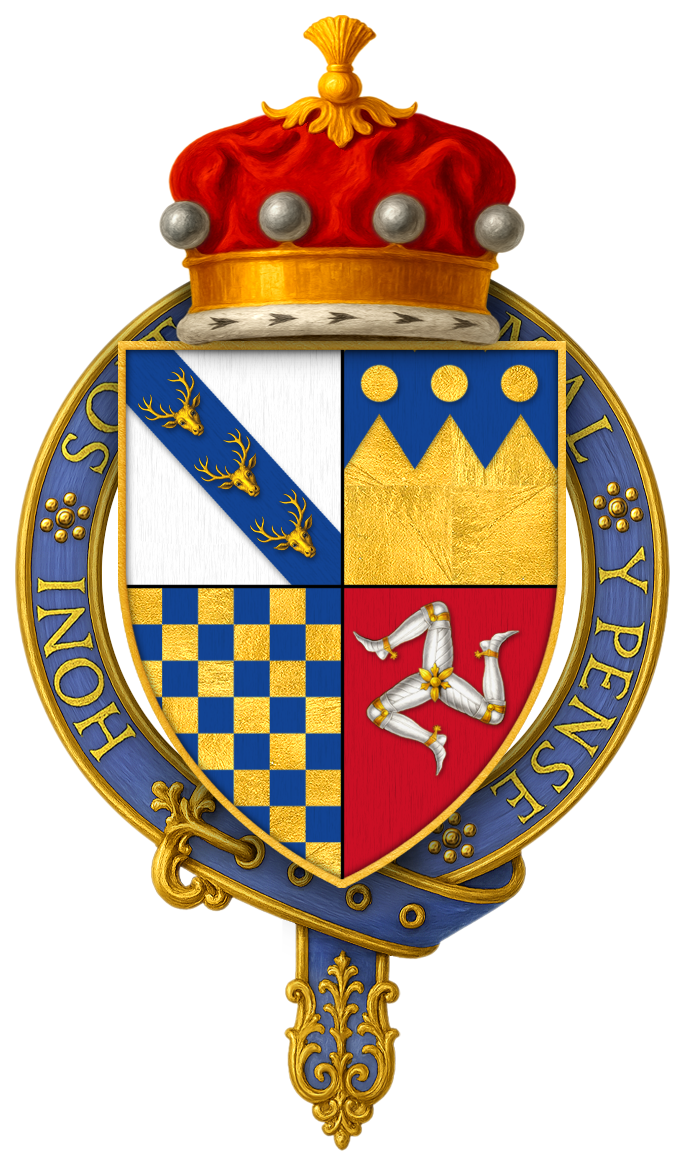
Arms of Sir George Stanley, 9th Baron Strange, of Knockin, KG

He was born about 1460 at Knowsley, Lancashire, England, the eldest son of Thomas Stanley and his first wife Eleanor, sister of Richard Neville, Earl of Warwick. On his father's second marriage to Lady Margaret Beaufort, Countess of Richmond, he became stepbrother to her son, Henry Tudor, later King Henry VII.

He was invested as a knight of the Order of the Bath in 1475 by King Edward IV. He held the offices of Constable of Pontefract Castle and Constable of Knaresborough Castle in 1485. He was present at the Battle of Bosworth Field, but as a hostage of Richard III who was trying to ensure the support of George's father and uncle and their substantial armies. He held the office of Constable of Wicklow Castle in 1486 and became Chief Justice of the Duchy of Lancaster in 1486. In 1487 he took part in the Battle of Stoke Field. In the same year he was invested with the Order of the Garter and was made a privy counsellor.

== Family ==
He was married in 1482 to Joan le Strange, 9th Baroness Strange (c. 1460 - 1514), daughter of John le Strange, 8th Baron Strange (c. 1440 - 1477) and Jacquetta Woodville (daughter of Richard Woodville, 1st Earl Rivers and Jacquetta of Luxembourg), thereby becoming 9th Baron Strange de jure uxoris (in the right of his wife) and was summoned to Parliament in this role. Their children were:

- John Stanley (d. 1503).
- Thomas Stanley, 2nd Earl of Derby (1485–1521).
- James Stanley, knight (1486–1562), who founded the branch of the family known as the 'Stanleys of Bickerstaffe', from which the 11th Earl of Derby and all subsequent earls descend.
- George Stanley.
- Jane Stanley, who married Sir Robert Sheffield (died 15 November 1531), son of Sir Robert Sheffield, Speaker of the House of Commons, by his first wife, Helen Delves, by whom she was the mother of Edmund Sheffield, 1st Baron Sheffield.
- Elizabeth Stanley.
- Margaret Stanley.

== Death ==
Stanley died in Derby House, St Paul's Wharf, London over 4–5 December 1503, allegedly of poison following a banquet. He was buried in the London church of St James Garlickhythe nearby.
