= Douglas Sheffield, Baroness Sheffield =

Lover of Robert Dudley, 1st Earl of Leicester

Douglas Sheffield
- Lady Sheffield
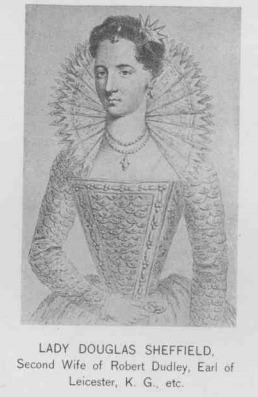
- Born: 1542/1543
- Died: 1608; Westminster
- Noble family: Howard
- Spouses: John Sheffield, 2nd Baron Sheffield; Sir Edward Stafford
- Issue: Elizabeth Butler, Countess of Ormonde; Edmund Sheffield, 1st Earl of Mulgrave; Sir Robert Dudley (illegitimate)
- Father: William Howard, 1st Baron Howard of Effingham
- Mother: Margaret Gamage

Douglas, Lady Sheffield (née Howard; 1542/1543 – 1608), was an English noblewoman, the lover of Robert Dudley, 1st Earl of Leicester and mother by him of explorer-cartographer Sir Robert Dudley, an illegitimate son.

Seventeen years after Leicester's death she claimed in litigation that she had secretly been his wife, although she had herself remarried while Leicester was still alive.

== Family and first marriage ==
Douglas Howard was the eldest daughter of William Howard, 1st Baron Howard of Effingham, by his second wife, Margaret Gamage. Douglas Howard was probably named in honour of her godmother Margaret Douglas, Countess of Lennox. One of her brothers was Lord High Admiral Charles Howard of Effingham.

Douglas Howard was at court by about 1559, probably as a maid of honour. In 1560 she married a rich peer, John Sheffield, 2nd Baron Sheffield. They had a daughter and a son: Edmund Sheffield, 1st Earl of Mulgrave, who was born in 1565, and Elizabeth Sheffield, who later married Thomas Butler, 10th Earl of Ormonde, and died in November 1600.

== Love affair ==
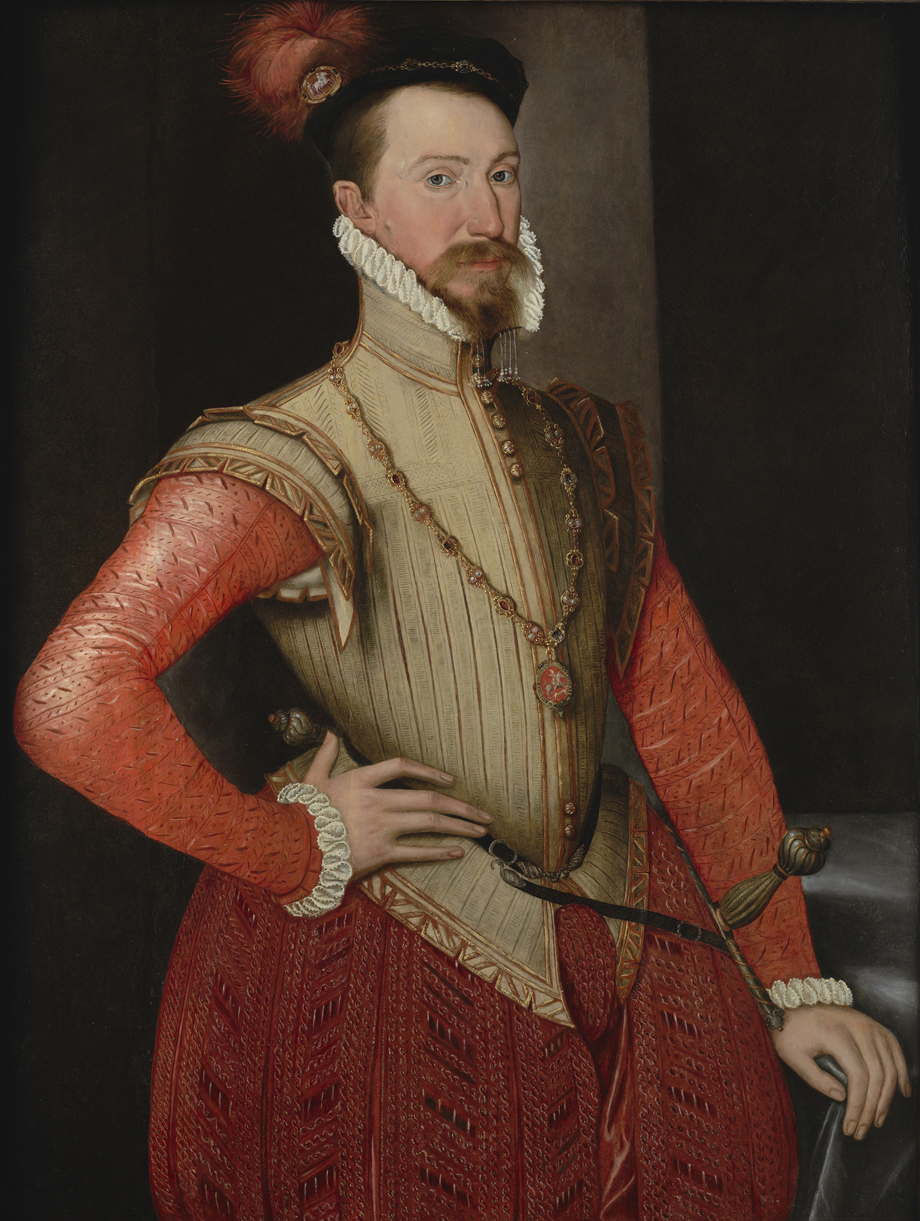
Robert Dudley, Earl of Leicester, lover of Douglas Sheffield

Not long after the death of John, Lord Sheffield, in December 1568, his widow began an affair with Robert Dudley, 1st Earl of Leicester, Queen Elizabeth's favourite. At some point in the following years, Leicester wrote her a remarkable letter, pondering on the history of their love and explaining to her the reasons why he could not marry, not even to beget a legitimate heir; it would result in his "utter overthrow":

You must think it is some marvellous cause, and toucheth my present state very near, that forceth me thus to be cause almost of the ruin of mine own house ... my brother you see long married and not like to have children, it resteth so now in myself; and yet such occasions is there ... as if I should marry I am sure never to have [the queen's] favour.

He continues, proposing that she accept one of the suitors for her hand, who she had so far declined for his sake: "The choice falls not oft, and yet I know you may have now of the best; and it is not my part to bid you take them ... so it were not mine honesty to bid you refuse them." He would help her, in case she wanted to marry elsewhere for reasons of respectability: "for when you have made your election you shall find me a most willing and ready friend to perform all good offices toward you". On 11 May 1573, the court correspondent Gilbert Talbot observed that the Earl of Leicester was pursued by Lady Douglas and her sister:

There are two sisters now in the court that are very far in love with him, as they have long been; my Lady Sheffield and Frances Howard. They (of like striving who shall love him better) are at great wars together and the queen thinketh not well of them, and not the better of him.

In August 1574, Douglas's son Robert Dudley was born. Leicester acknowledged the paternity of his "base son" and was very fond of him, caring much for his well-being and education.

It is unclear how long Leicester's affair with Lady Sheffield continued, but nearly thirty years later her version of events was that Leicester had wanted to end their relationship around 1578, before his marriage to Lettice Knollys, the widowed Countess of Essex. She claimed they had met at Greenwich in the garden, where Leicester wanted her to "disavow the marriage", offering her seven hundred pounds a year, but she had passionately rejected the offer. Leicester became furious, saying he could as well part from her, leaving her penniless. Upon some reflection, she accepted the offer at last.

In 1604 Lady Sheffield claimed that she had refused to surrender the custody of their son, Robert, for fear that his father, Leicester, would have him killed. However, there is no trace of any disagreement over young Robert's upbringing and whereabouts. He grew up in Leicester's and his friends' houses, having "leave to see" his mother whenever she wished.

== Second marriage and Star Chamber trial ==
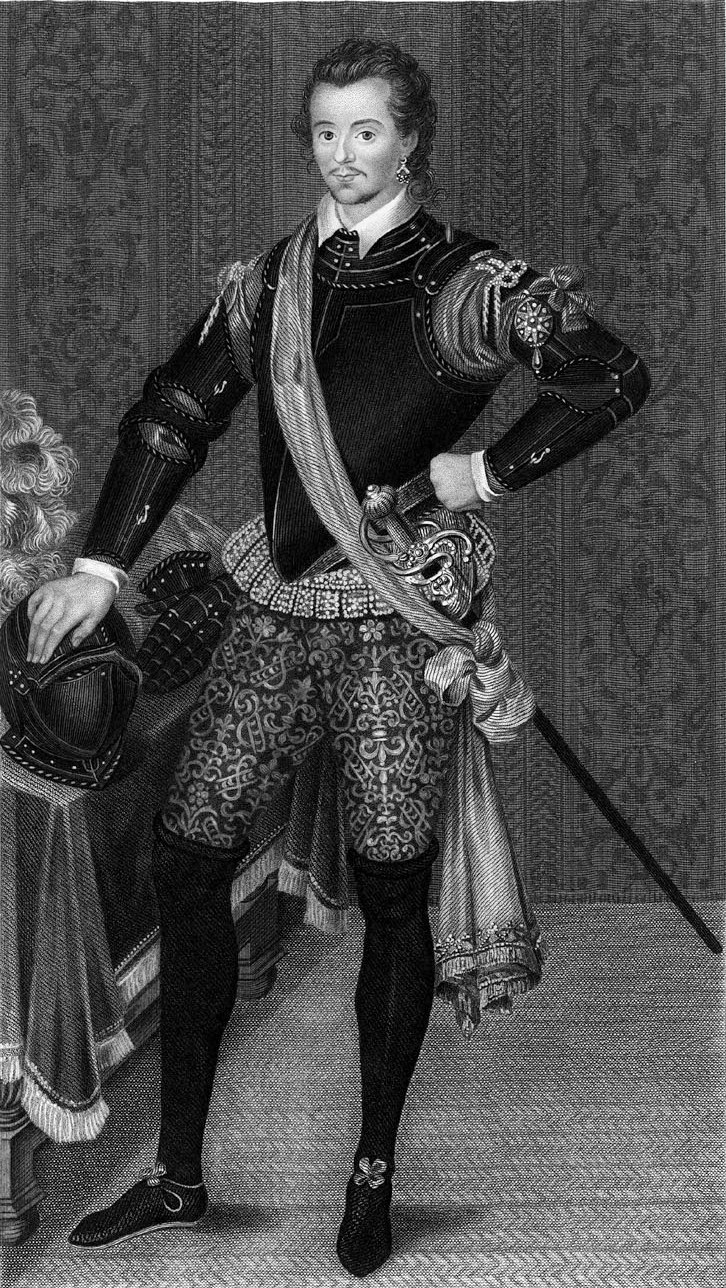
Sir Robert Dudley, son of Douglas Sheffield

On 29 November 1579 Douglas Sheffield married Sir Edward Stafford, whose mother, Dorothy Stafford, was very influential with the Queen. From 1583 until 1591 Edward Stafford served as English ambassador to the court of Henry III of France; his wife accompanied him to Paris. There Lady Sheffield became a prominent figure in society and a special friend of Catherine de' Medici, whom she advised about a reform of the French royal household. By Stafford she had two children, who both died young. The ambassador honoured his wife greatly, but had to cope with the fact that she was still emotionally agitated by remembrances of the Earl of Leicester. Stafford was politically opposed to Leicester, and the personal tensions aggravated this rivalry.

After the death of Queen Elizabeth in May 1603, Lady Sheffield's son, Sir Robert Dudley, began trying to claim his father's and his uncle's extinct titles of Earl of Leicester and Earl of Warwick. He said he had been told by a shadowy adventurer called Thomas Drury that his parents had been secretly married. The case ended up in the Star Chamber and aroused great public interest between 1604 and 1605. The court heard ninety witnesses for Dudley and fifty-seven for Leicester's widow, Lettice Knollys. Lady Sheffield did not attend the trial in person, but she declared in writing that Leicester had solemnly contracted to marry her in Cannon Row, Westminster, in 1571, and that they were married at Esher, Surrey, "in wintertime" in 1573. Yet all of the ten putative witnesses ("besides others") to the ceremony were long dead since. Neither could she remember who the clergyman was, nor the exact date of the marriage. As an explanation for marrying Edward Stafford, she asserted that Leicester had tried to poison her and, "life being sweet", she had determined to marry "for safeguard of her life". The Star Chamber rejected the evidence and fined several of the witnesses. It was concluded that Sir Robert Dudley had been duped by Thomas Drury, who in his turn had sought "his own private gains".

Sir Edward Stafford died while the proceedings in the Star Chamber were in progress. Required to answer questions for the case, he maintained that Sir Robert Dudley had "terrified" his mother into supporting him against her deep reservations. Stafford wrote that he had asked his wife in December 1579, on the Queen's command, if she had been contracted to Leicester, to which "she answered with great vows, grief and passion that she had trusted the said earl too much to have anything to show to constrain him to marry her." (Note: In the 19th century, the question of Sir Robert Dudley's legitimacy was again raised in the House of Lords, but again, it remained unresolved. Historians have had differing views on the problem: While Derek Wilson believes in a marriage (Wilson 1981 p. 326), it has been rejected by, for example, Conyers Read (Read 1936 p. 23), Johanna Rickman (Rickman 2008 p. 51), and Simon Adams (Adams 2008).)

Douglas Sheffield died in early December 1608 at Westminster. In her will she left a black velvet bed among other things to her "honourable and beloved son Sir Robert Dudley".
