= Thomas Stanley, 1st Baron Stanley =

English nobleman (c. 1405–1459)

Arms of Stanley: Argent, on a bend azure three buck's heads cabossed or

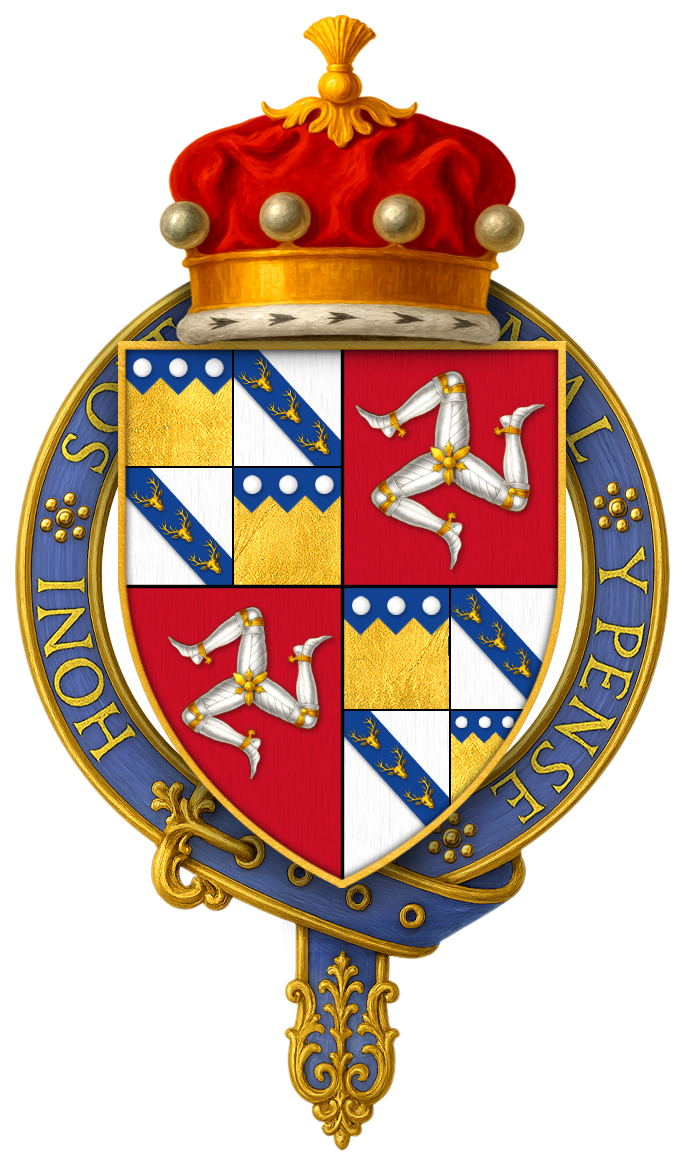
Quartered arms of Sir Thomas Stanley, 1st Baron Stanley, KG

Sir Thomas Stanley, 1st Baron Stanley, titular King of Mann, KG (c. 1405 – 11 or 20 February 1459), of Lathom and Knowsley, Lancashire, was a Privy Councillor, Comptroller of the Royal Household, Lieutenant-Governor of Ireland (1431–36), Chief Steward of the Duchy of Lancaster, Knight of the Shire for Lancashire, Constable & Justice of Chester, Chamberlain of North Wales, Lord Chamberlain (1455), and from 15 January 1456 was summoned by Writ to Parliament as Lord Stanley.

== Life ==
Stanley was the son of Sir John Stanley, of Liverpool, Lathom, and Knowsley (in Huyton), Lancashire, by his wife, Elizabeth, daughter of Sir Nicholas Harington (or Haverington) of Farleton (in Melling), Lancashire. He represented Lancashire in the House of Commons in 1427, 1433, 1439, 1442, 1447, 1449, 1450, 1453, 1455.

In 1424 he was attacked in his father's tower at Liverpool by Sir Richard Molyneaux, who was arrested. His family had long associations with the governance of Ireland, his grandfather Sir John Stanley, K.G., having been both Justiciar and Lord Lieutenant of Ireland (and who died there), and in 1429 he was sent to Ireland and called a Parliament in that Kingdom in 1432.

In 1437, he succeeded to the title of King of Mann upon the death of his father, John Stanley.

During the Parliament at Westminster in 1450-1 the House of Commons demanded his removal from the Royal presence with others of the Duke of Suffolk's party.

== Marriage and issue ==
He married Joan Goushill (1401–1466), eldest daughter and co-heiress of Sir Robert Goushill, of Hoveringham in Nottinghamshire, by his wife Elizabeth Fitzalan, Duchess of Norfolk, a daughter of Richard Fitzalan, 11th Earl of Arundel. By his wife he had four sons and three daughters:

- Thomas Stanley, 1st Earl of Derby (1435–1504), KG, eldest son and heir, who in 1485 was created Earl of Derby by King Henry VII following his decisive assistance in the Battle of Bosworth. He married twice, firstly to Eleanor de Neville, secondly to Lady Margaret Beaufort, mother of King Henry VII.
- William Stanley (c.1435–1495), KG, 2nd son, invested as a Knight of the Garter in 1487 by King Henry VII, but executed by that king in 1495 for treason for his alleged part in the Perkin Warbeck conspiracy.
- Sir John Stanley, ancestor of the Barons Stanley of Alderley;
- James Stanley, Archdeacon of Chester;
- Elizabeth Stanley, wife successively of Sir Richard Molyneux (d.1459), killed in the Battle of Blore Heath, and Thomas Strange;
- Margaret Stanley, wife successively of Sir William Troutbeck (d.1459), killed in the Battle of Blore Heath; Sir John Boteler, and Henry Grey, 4th (7th) Baron Grey of Codnor, her grandson was Sir William Griffith of Penrhyn Castle, Chamberlain of North Wales;
- Katherine Stanley, wife of Sir John Savage, of Clifton, Cheshire. Of their many sons, the eldest, Sir John Savage, KG, was the commander of the left wing of Henry Tudor's army at the Battle of Bosworth in 1485; another, Sir Christopher Savage of Aston-under-Edge, Gloucestershire, fell at the Battle of Flodden, and another, Thomas Savage, was Archbishop of York.

== Death and burial ==
He died on 11 February 1459 and was buried in Burscough Priory, near his home at Lathom, Lancashire, where his wife was later buried also.

Political offices
Preceded by –	Lord Lieutenant of Ireland; 1431–1436	Succeeded by –
Preceded by The Lord Cromwell	Lord Chamberlain; 1455–1459	Succeeded by Earl of Salisbury
Peerage of England
New creation	Baron Stanley; 1456–1459	Succeeded by Thomas Stanley
Head of State of the Isle of Man
Preceded by John II Stanley	King of Mann; 1437–1459	Succeeded by Thomas Stanley
