= John Stanley (KG) =

English knight and statesman (c. 1350 – 1414)

Sir John Stanley, KG (c. 1350–1414) of Lathom, near Ormskirk in Lancashire, was Lord Lieutenant of Ireland and titular King of Mann, the first of that name. He married a potential heiress, Isabel Lathom, and several unexpected deaths soon made her very wealthy. This marriage, combined with his own abilities, allowed him to rise above the usual status of a younger son.

== Origins ==
He was the second son of Sir William Stanley of Stourton, by his wife Alice Massey of Timperley, Cheshire. Sir William Stanley was Master-Forester of the Forest of Wirral and was notorious for his repressive activities.

== Marriage and children ==
Arms of Lathom of Lathom: Or, on a chief indented azure three plates. Quartered by Stanley, Earls of Derby

In 1385 he married Isabel Lathom, daughter and heiress of Sir Thomas Lathom of Lathom in Lancashire, a great landowner in south-west Lancashire. The marriage took place despite the opposition of John of Gaunt, 1st Duke of Lancaster and gave Stanley great wealth he could never have hoped for as the younger son. By his wife, he had four sons and two daughters, including:

- Sir John Stanley (died 1437), eldest son and heir;
- Henry Stanley;
- Thomas Stanley;
- Ralph Stanley

== Crest of Lathom ==
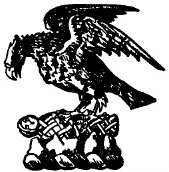
Heraldic crest of Lathom: An eagle wings extended or preying on a child proper swaddled gules in a cradle laced or, adopted by Sir John Stanley and his descendants the Earls of Derby

The heraldic crest of Lathom (An eagle wings extended or preying on a child proper swaddled gules in a cradle laced or) was adopted by Sir John Stanley and his descendants. An ancient myth ("the Stanley Legend"), of several varieties, is attached to the image depicted, one given by Thomas Stanley (died circa 1568), Bishop of Sodor and Man being that the "Lord of Lathom" was issueless and aged "fowerscore" adopted an infant "swaddled and clad in a mantle of redd," which an eagle brought unhurt to her nest in Terlestowe wood, and which he named Oskell, and made heir of Lathom, where he became the father of Isabel Stanley, stolen away in the first instance by her knight, and afterwards forgiven by Sir Oskell". The Stanley crest is today memorialised in the name of several English public houses displaying the sign of "The Eagle and Child", often situated within manors once held by the Stanley family.

== Career ==
=== Declared an outlaw ===
Both John Stanley and his elder brother, William Stanley (who succeeded their father as Master-Forester), were involved in criminal cases which charged them with a forced entry in 1369 and with the murder of Thomas Clotton in 1376. Conviction for the murder of Clotton resulted in Stanley being declared an outlaw. However, he was already distinguishing himself in military service in the French wars, and he was pardoned in 1378 at the insistence of his commander, Sir Thomas Trivet.

=== Justiciar of Ireland ===
The year 1386 saw his first appointment in Ireland as deputy to Robert de Vere, Duke of Ireland. This occurred because of the insurrection created by the friction between Sir Philip Courtenay, the English Lieutenant of Ireland, and his appointed governor James Butler, 3rd Earl of Ormond. Stanley led an expedition to Ireland on behalf of de Vere and King Richard II to quell it. He was accompanied by Bishop Alexander de Balscot of Meath and Sir Robert Crull. Butler joined them upon their arrival in Ireland. Because of the success of the expedition, Stanley was appointed to the position of Lord Lieutenant of Ireland, Alexander to Chancellor, Crull to Treasurer, and Butler to his old position as Governor. In 1389 Richard II appointed him Justiciar of Ireland, a post he held until 1391. He was heavily involved in Richard's first expedition to Ireland in 1394–1395.

Throughout the 1390s he was involved in placating possible rebellion in Cheshire. Between 1396 and 1398 he served as Captain of Roxburgh Castle. He took part in Richard II's expedition to Ireland in 1399. However, on his return to England, Stanley, who had long proved adept at political manoeuvring, turned his back on Richard and submitted to King Henry IV, the first of the House of Lancaster.

=== Under the Lancastrians ===
Stanley's fortunes were equally good under the Lancastrians. He was granted lordships in the Welsh Marches, and served a term as Lieutenant of Ireland. In 1403 he was made Steward of the Household of Henry, Prince of Wales, (later Henry V). Unlike many of the Cheshire gentry, he took the side of the king in the rebellion of the Percys. He was wounded in the throat at the Battle of Shrewsbury.

In 1405 he was granted the tenure of the Isle of Man, which had been confiscated from the rebellious Henry Percy, 1st Earl of Northumberland. In this period he also became Steward of the Household to King Henry IV, and was appointed by him a Knight of the Garter. In 1413 King Henry V of England sent him to serve once more as Lieutenant of Ireland. He summoned the Parliament, which met in Dublin in November 1413.

== Death and burial ==
In 1414 he died at Ardee, County Louth, Ireland, after being satirised by the O'Higgins' of Meath for despoiling the lands and raiding the cows of Niall O'Higgins. He lasted but five weeks, according to the Four Masters, before succumbing "to the virulence of the lampoons". His body was returned to his home at Lathom and was buried at Burscough Priory near Ormskirk, about 3 miles south-west of Lathom. This was deemed in some quarters the second such "Poet's Miracle" performed by the O'Higgins.

== Offices ==
During his career Stanley held the following offices:-

- Lord Lieutenant of Ireland between 1386 and 1388.
- Justiciar of Ireland between 1389 and 1391.
- Justice of Chester in 1394
- Controller of the Royal Household in 1399
- Lieutenant of Ireland between 1399 and 1401
- Steward of the Household to the Prince of Wales circa 1403, later King Henry V
- Surveyor of the Forests of Macclesfield, Mare and Mondrem, Cheshire in 1403
- Governor of the City and County of Cheshire in 1403
- He was invested as a Knight, Order of the Garter (K.G.) circa 1405
- Steward of Macclesfield in 1406

He was granted the Isle, Castle, Peel and Lordship of Mann, by King Henry IV of England

- Sovereign Lord of the Isle of Man in 1406
- Constable of Windsor Castle in 1409
- Lord Lieutenant of Ireland (second term) from 1413 until his death in 1414.

== Poet ==
It has been suggested that Stanley was the as-yet unidentified "Gawain Poet". The Garter motto "Honi soit qui mal y pense" appears at the end of Sir Gawain and the Green Knight, and the poet exhibits a detailed knowledge of both hunting and armour. Scholars identify the poet's dialect as that of north-west Staffordshire or south-east Cheshire.

== See also ==
- History Of Liverpool- Stanley Family Page
- Audley-Stanley family for Ancestors and descendants of John I Stanley
- Lathom Wikipedia article containing Stanley & Lathom history

Head of State of the Isle of Man
Preceded by Henry Percy, 1st Earl of Northumberland	King of Mann; 1405–1414	Succeeded by John Stanley II
Government offices
Preceded by Alexander de Balscot, Bishop of Meath	Lord Lieutenant of Ireland; 1389–1391	Succeeded by James Butler, 3rd Earl of Ormond
Preceded by Thomas Holland, Duke of Surrey	Lord Lieutenant of Ireland; 1399–1402	Succeeded by Thomas of Lancaster, Duke of Clarence
Preceded by Thomas of Lancaster, Duke of Clarence	Lord Lieutenant of Ireland; 1413–1414	Succeeded by Thomas Cranley, Archbishop of Dublin
