= King of Mann =

Former sovereign of the Isle of Man

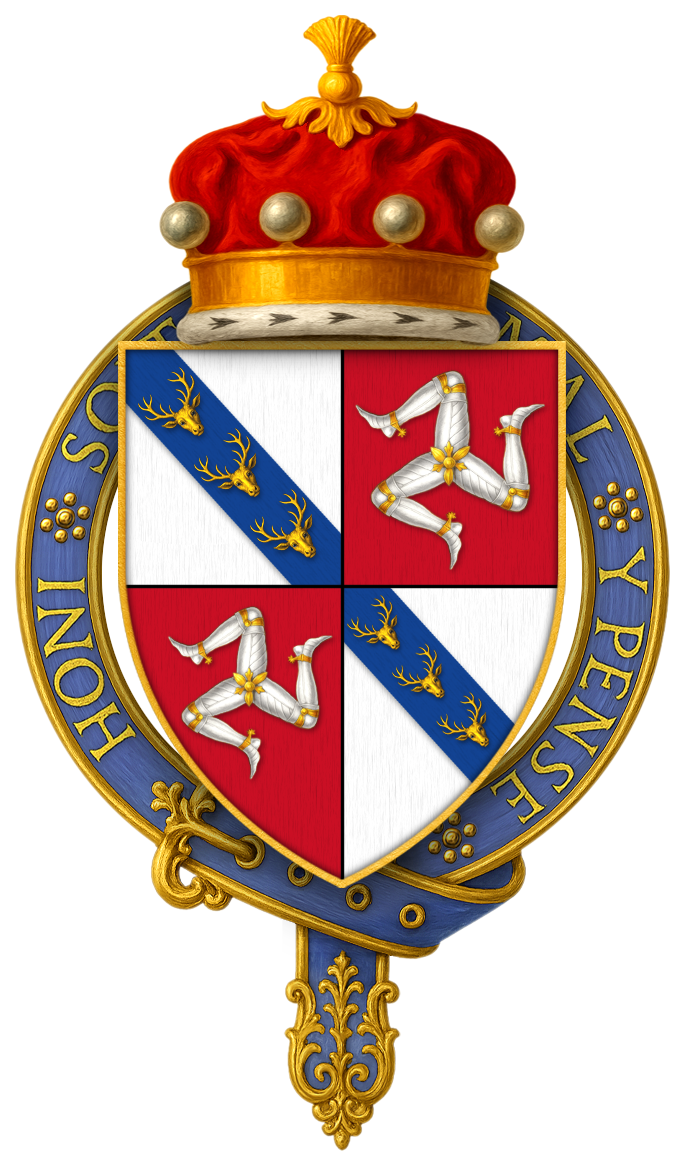
Arms of Sir John I Stanley of the Isle of Man KG (d. 1414), first Stanley King of Mann

The King of Mann (Manx: Ree Vannin) was the title taken between 1237 and 1504 by the various rulers, both sovereign and suzerain, over the Kingdom of Mann – the Isle of Man which is located in the Irish Sea, at the centre of the British Isles. Since 1504, the head of state has been known as the Lord of Mann.

== Kingdom of Mann and the Isles (836–1237) ==
The Kingdom of the Isles about the year 1100. The Isle of Man is the southernmost island in red.

See Kingdom of the Isles and List of rulers of the Kingdom of the Isles

After the emergence of Somerled and his descendants in the 12th century, the Manx kings began to lose territory and power in the Hebrides. Before the reigns of the three sons of Olaf the Black, the Manx kings styled themselves "King of the Isles". By the time of the reigns of Olaf's sons, the kings had begun to style themselves "King of Mann and the Isles".

=== Early Norse rulers ===
- Otir (912?–914?)
- Ragnall ua Ímair (914-921?)
- Gothfrith ua Ímair (pre 927-?)
- Amlaíb mac Gofraid (pre 935-941)

=== Kings of the Hebrides and Mann (Late 10th and 11th centuries) ===
- Maccus mac Arailt (980-?)
- Gofraid mac Arailt (?-989)
- Gilli (Hebridean earl) (990-?)
- Ragnall mac Gofraid (?-1005)
- Sigurd the Stout (1005–1014)
- Amlaíb mac Sitriuc (1030?–1034)
- Ímar mac Arailt (c 1045?)
- Echmarcach mac Ragnaill (1052–1061)
- Murchad mac Diarmata (1061–1070)
- Diarmait mac Maíl na mBó (1070–1072)
- Godred Sitricson (?–1074)
- Fingal Godredson (1074-?)
- Godred Crovan (1079–1094)

=== Kings of Mann and the Isles ===
- Magnus Barelegs (1098–1102), Direct Norwegian rule
- Sigurd Magnusson (1102–1103), Direct Norwegian rule
- Lagmann Godredsson (1103–1110)
- Domnall mac Taidc Uí Briain (1111–1112)
- Olaf the Red (1112–1152)
- Godred the Black (1154-1156)
- Dubgall mac Somairle & Godred the Black (1156–1158)
- Somerled (1158–1164)

=== Kings of Mann and the North Isles ===
- Rǫgnvaldr Óláfsson (fl. 1164) (1164)
- Godred the Black (1164–1187)
- Raghnall mac Gofraidh (1188–1226)
- Olaf the Black (1226–1237)
- Óspakr-Hákon (1230)
- Gofraid Donn (1230)

== Suzerainty of Norway (1237–1265) ==
The Kings of Mann and the Isles were vassals of the Kings of Norway.

- Harald Olafsson (1237–1248)
- Ragnald Olafsson (1249)
- Harald Godredson (1249–1252)
- Magnus Olafsson (1252–1265)

== Scottish and English rule (1265–1333) ==
Between 1265 and 1333, Mann was ruled directly by the kings of Scotland (1265–1290, 1293–1296, 1313–1317, 1328–1333) or the kings of England (1290–1293, 1296–1313, 1317–1328).

== Independent kingdom (1333–1399) ==
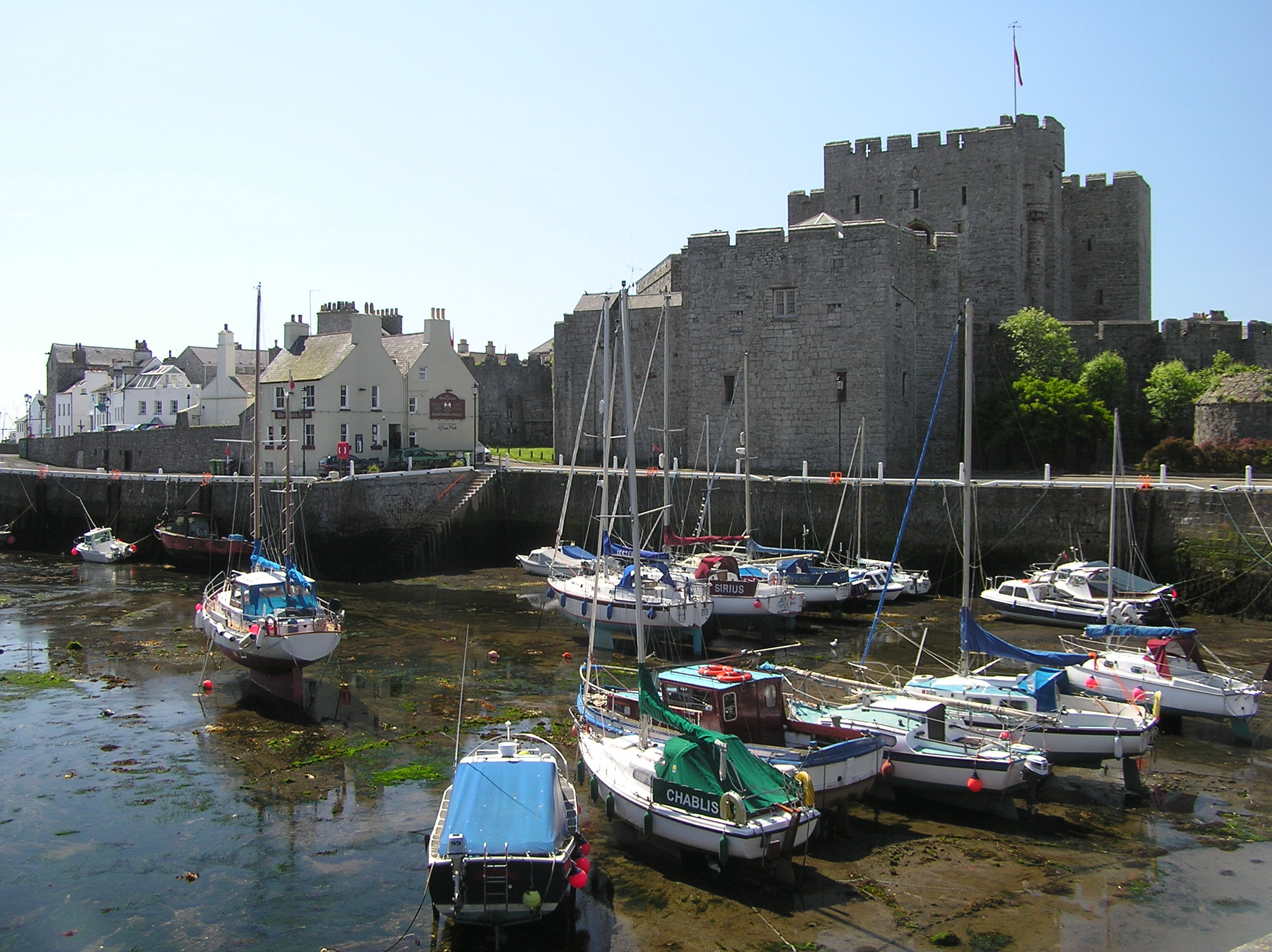
Castle Rushen, Castletown, Isle of Man, the stronghold on the island of the Kings and Lords of Mann

On 9 August 1333 Edward III renounced all royal claims over the Isle of Man, and recognised it as an independent kingdom under its then king, William Montacute, 1st Earl of Salisbury.

Totum jus et clamium quod habemus, habuimus vel aliquo modo habere poterimus, in Insula de Man cum suis pertinentiis quibuscumque; ita quod nec Nos, nec haeredes nostri, seu quivis alius nostro nomine, aliquid juris vel clamii in Insula praedicta de caetero exigere poterimus vel vindicare.

The whole right and claim that We have, We have had, or in any manner shall We be able to have in the future, in the island of Man with all its privileges, so that neither We, nor Our heirs, or any other in Our name, will not demand or avenge in the future the aforesaid right or claim to the island.

— Renunciation of claim to Mann by Edward III, 1333

William le Scrope, Earl of Wiltshire was the last King of Mann in this line, claiming descent from the House of Godred Crovan, the earlier Norse Rulers.

William le Scrope was executed for treason for his support of Richard II in his struggle with Henry Bolingbroke, who defeated Richard and became Henry IV. Le Scrope's possessions, including the Isle of Man, passed to the Crown.

=== Kings of Mann in this period ===
- William Montagu, 1st Earl of Salisbury (1333–1344)
- William Montagu, 2nd Earl of Salisbury (1344–1392)
- William Scrope, 1st Earl of Wiltshire (1392–1399)

== English suzerainty (1399–1521) ==
As Henry's predecessor, Edward III, had recognised Mann as an independent kingdom, Henry IV did not directly claim the Manx throne, but instead proclaimed that he had acquired the island by right of conquest, which in international legal theory at that time erased any existing constitutional arrangements. He then on 19 October 1399 granted the Island, as a fiefdom under the English Crown, to Henry Percy, 1st Earl of Northumberland together with wide-ranging powers of government and associated regalities, together with the style of 'Lord of Man', in a position of feudality and thus without sovereignty. Despite this, Percy styled himself as 'King of Mann'.

We have given and granted … to the said Earl of Northumberland the Island, Castle, Peel and Lordship of Man, and all the islands and lordships appertaining to the said Isle of Man, which belonged to Sir William le Scrope deceased, whom in his life We lately conquered, and so have decreed him conquered, and which by reason of that conquest, as having been conquered, We seized into Our hands; which decree and conquest as touching the person of the said William and all his lands and tenements, goods and chattels, as well within as without Our Kingdom, in Our Parliament by the assent of the Lords temporal … at the petition of the Commons of Our said Kingdom, are confirmed …

— Letters-patent of 19 October 1399

Following Percy's treasonous rebellion, Henry IV granted the suzerainty of the Isle of Man, on similar terms but only for the term of his life, to Sir John Stanley in 1405. In addition, but separate from the power of governance over the Island, John Stanley was also granted the patronage of the Diocese of Sodor and Man.

A second letters-patent were issued and re-granted to Sir John Stanley on 6 April 1406, the difference being that the grant was inheritable and had a different feudal fee, the service of which comprised rendering homage and a tribute of two falcons to all future kings of England on their coronations.

=== Kings of Mann in this period ===
- Henry Percy, 1st Earl of Northumberland (1399–1405)
- Sir John Stanley (I) (1405–1414)
- Sir John Stanley (II) (1414–1437)
- Thomas Stanley, 1st Baron Stanley (1437–1459)
- Thomas Stanley, 1st Earl of Derby (1459–1504)
- Thomas Stanley, 2nd Earl of Derby (1504‒1521)

== Lord of Mann (1521–Present) ==
Edward Stanley, 3rd Earl of Derby, the son of Thomas Stanley, 2nd Earl of Derby, did not take the style "King", and he and his successors were generally known instead as Lord of Mann. However, the Latin style Rex Manniae et Insularum (King of Mann and the Isles) continued to be occasionally used in official documents until at least the 17th century.

In 1765 the title was revested in the Crown of Great Britain; thus today the title, Lord of Mann, is used by King Charles III.

== Claims to the throne ==
In 2007, an American businessman named David Drew Howe, after researching his genealogy, claimed to be rightful "King of Man". His attempts to claim the defunct title and gain the acceptance of his "subjects" are the focus of the 2015 TLC docudrama series Suddenly Royal. In 2017, Howe "abdicated the throne" and abandoned any claims to the title of 'King of Man'.

== See also ==
- History of the Isle of Man
- Noble and royal titles of the Isle of Man
