= Thomas Stanley, 1st Earl of Derby =

English nobleman (1435–1504)

Thomas Stanley
- Earl of Derby
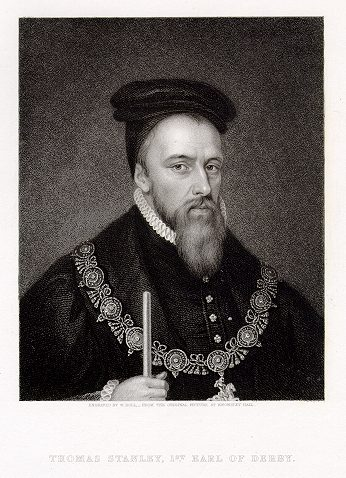
- 19th-century engraving of Stanley after a 16th-century portrait
- Born: 1435
- Died: 29 July 1504 (aged 69); Lathom, Lancashire, England
- Spouses: Lady Eleanor Neville (m. 1451; died 1472); Lady Margaret Beaufort (m. 1472)
- Issue: George Stanley, 9th Baron Strange; Edward Stanley, 1st Baron Monteagle; James Stanley, Bishop of Ely
- Father: Thomas Stanley, 1st Baron Stanley
- Mother: Joan Goushill

Quartered arms of Sir Thomas Stanley, 1st Earl of Derby, KG

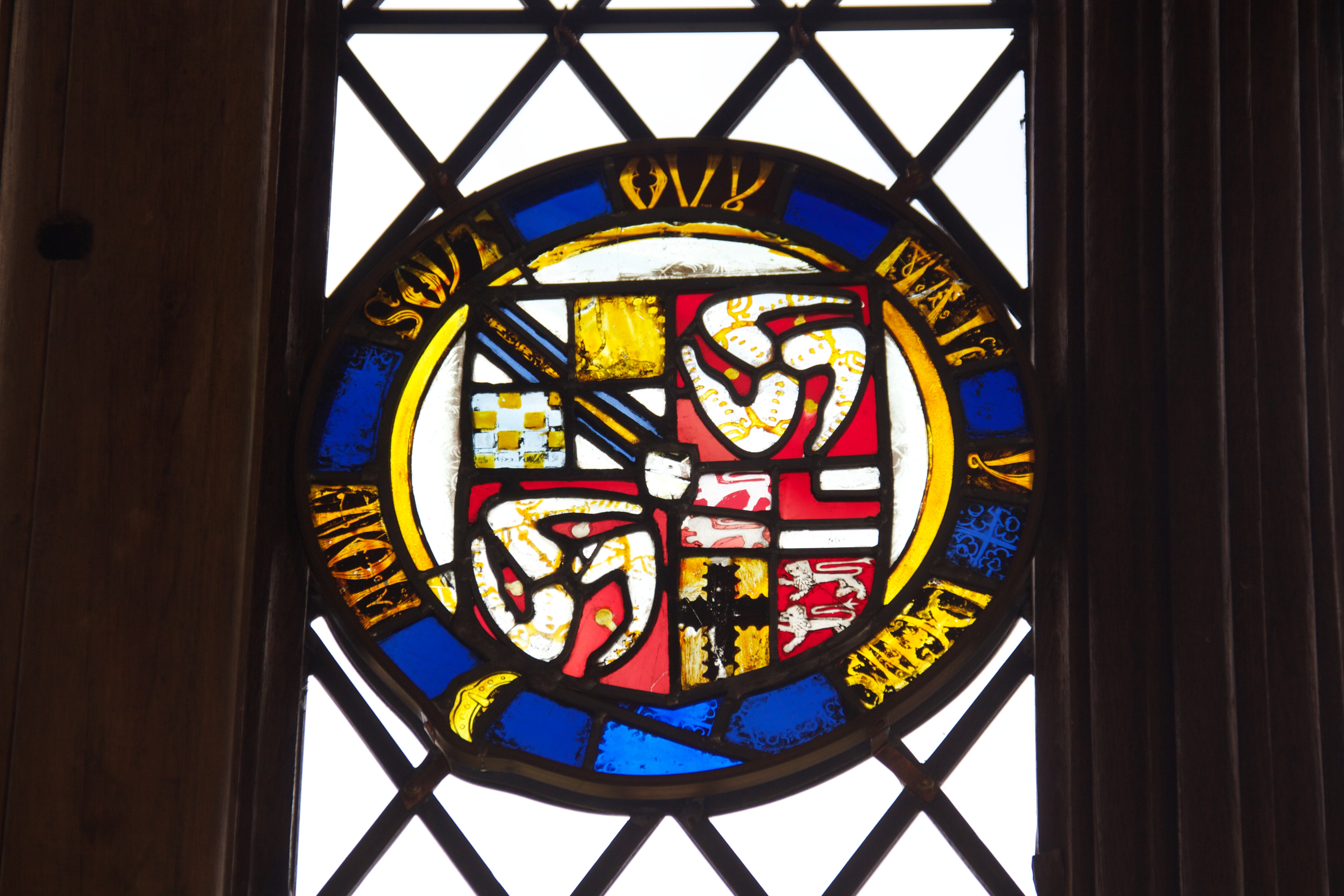
Stained glass at Ordsall Hall, Salford, Lancashire, showing the arms of Stanley: 1st grand quarter: quarterly - 1&4: Stanley; 2: Lathom (erased); 3: de Warenne, Earl of Surrey; 2nd & 3rd grand quarters: King of Man; 4th grand quarter: quarterly - 1&4: Strange of Knockyn; 2: Woodville; 3: Mohun of Dunster Castle, Baron Mohun. All circumscribed by the Garter. Possibly the arms of Thomas Stanley, 1st Earl of Derby (1435–1504), KG

Thomas Stanley, 1st Earl of Derby, KG (1435 – 29 July 1504) was an English nobleman. He was the stepfather of Henry VII of England through his marriage to the King's mother, Lady Margaret Beaufort. He was the eldest son of Thomas Stanley, 1st Baron Stanley and Joan Goushill.

A landed magnate of immense wealth and power, particularly across the northwest of England where his authority went almost unchallenged, Stanley managed to remain in favour with successive kings throughout the Wars of the Roses, including King Richard III of England, who took Stanley's son as a hostage. Thomas Stanley took the side of Henry Tudor at the Battle of Bosworth in 1485. His estates included what is now Tatton Park in Cheshire, Lathom House in Lancashire, and Derby House in the City of London, now the site of the College of Arms.

Although the king for the early part of his career, Henry VI, was head of the House of Lancaster, Stanley's marriage to Eleanor, daughter of Richard Neville, 5th Earl of Salisbury (a descendant of Edward III) and sister of Richard Neville, Earl of Warwick ('Warwick the Kingmaker') in the late 1450s constituted a powerful alliance with the House of York. This did him no harm, however, even after Warwick was toppled from power, and in 1472, with the House of York again occupying the English throne, he married his second wife Lady Margaret Beaufort, whose son, Henry Tudor, was the leading Lancastrian claimant. He was the last to use the style 'King of Mann', his successors opting for the safer 'Lord of Mann'. Among his notable close relatives were his brother Sir William Stanley and his nephews Sir John Savage and Thomas Savage, Archbishop of York.

== Inheritance ==
After the death of his father in 1459, Stanley inherited his father's titles, including those of Baron Stanley and King of Mann as well as his extensive lands and offices in Cheshire and Lancashire. It was a formidable inheritance and gave him ample opportunity to gain experience in the leadership of men. At the same time, his father's prominence in the king's household had provided him with an early introduction to court where he was named among the squires of Henry VI in 1454. Nevertheless, in the febrile and bloodthirsty circumstances of the Wars of the Roses it was a position fraught with danger as rival claimants for the throne – successively the Houses of Lancaster and York – demanded, threatened or begged for the support of Stanley and his followers.

== Lancaster vs York ==
The Stanleys had been among the earliest supporters of Henry Bolingbroke's bid to win the English throne for the House of Lancaster in 1399 and Stanley's great-grandfather Sir John Stanley, had been richly rewarded for his assistance. After some years of weak and ineffectual government led by the Lancastrian Henry VI, a challenge from the House of York broke out into open warfare in the 1450s in the War of the Roses.

In 1459, an accord between the Lancastrian and the Yorkist lords broke down, and the conflict lapped at the borders of the Stanleys' sphere of influence. With the Earl of Salisbury (Stanley's father-in-law) mobilising on behalf of the House of York, Queen Margaret of Anjou at Lichfield ordered Stanley to raise forces to intercept him. However, when the two armies met at the Battle of Blore Heath in 1459, though only a few miles away, Stanley kept his 2,000 men out of the fight. His brother, Sir William Stanley, who was certainly in the Yorkist army was subsequently attainted.

Yet by 1460, Lord Stanley had begun to cooperate with the Yorkist lords who by this time had possession of the King and ruled in his name, and he rapidly consolidated his association with the new regime. In the early 1460s, he joined his brother-in-law, Warwick, in the campaigns against the Lancastrian forces and Stanley was confirmed in his fees and offices as the new King, Edward IV, needed him to secure the north-west.

In the late 1460s, however, the coalition that had brought the Yorkist Edward to the throne was fracturing and Stanley found his loyalties divided once again. "The dramatic shifts in political fortune between 1469 and 1471, and their impact on the tangled networks of affinity and allegiance, are hard to unravel".

When Warwick, fleeing before Edward in 1470, made his way to Manchester in the hope of support, Stanley was not forthcoming, but on Warwick's return, he lent him armed support in the restoration of the House of Lancaster and of Henry VI. Lord Stanley was soon forgiven for his disloyalty. After the restoration of Edward IV in 1471, he was appointed steward of the king's household and thereafter became a regular member of the royal council. Yet, the death of his first wife, Eleanor Neville at this period severed his connection with Warwick and the Nevilles and allowed in 1472 a marriage of still greater political significance. His new wife, Lady Margaret Beaufort, dowager Countess of Richmond, was the mother of Henry Tudor – potential heir of the House of Lancaster.

Militarily during this period, and now a stalwart of the Yorkist regime, Stanley led several hundred men in the expedition to France in 1475 and in 1482 served with a large company in the campaign of the Duke of Gloucester (later Richard III) in Scotland, playing a key role in the capture of Berwick upon Tweed.

After the unexpected death of Edward IV in 1483 and the accession of his twelve-year-old son Edward V, Stanley was among those who sought to maintain a balance of power between the young king's uncle, Richard, Duke of Gloucester, who was now Lord Protector, and his maternal family, the Woodvilles. (Stanley's own son and heir, George Stanley, Lord Strange was married to Joan Le Strange whose mother was Jacquetta Woodville, sister of Elizabeth Woodville, and made his wife a cousin of the new King, Edward V). When Gloucester attacked this group at a council meeting in June 1483, Stanley was wounded and imprisoned but at least spared the fate of Lord Hastings – that of summary execution. That month, Parliament declared Edward V and his younger brother Richard, Duke of York (the Princes in the Tower) illegitimate on the grounds that their father Edward IV's marriage to Elizabeth Woodville was bigamous, by way of a prior pre-contract of marriage with Eleanor Butler. The Duke of Gloucester was therefore declared king Richard III by public acclamation, later confirmed by Parliament under the Act Titulus Regius.

Apparently "in preparing the ground for the usurpation and in consolidating his position, Richard found it more expedient to appease than to alienate the house of Stanley". Thus, Lord Stanley was soon at liberty and continued as steward of the royal household, apparently flourishing at the heart of the new regime. He bore the great mace at Richard's coronation, while his wife carried the new queen's train. Richard stripped Stanley's wife, Margaret Beaufort, of all her titles and possession for her part "in compassyng and doyng Treason", but transferred all her properties to Stanley, effectively negating much of the punishment.

He was also appointed to the Order of the Garter, taking the stall vacated by the executed Lord Hastings. This commitment bore further fruit in the autumn of 1483, when a series of plots against the King coalesced into Buckingham's rebellion, a rising in southern and western England under the loose leadership of the Duke of Buckingham. When Richard rose to suppress the rebellion, Stanley and his brother William were at the King's side and were richly rewarded from the forfeited estates of the rebels and Stanley was appointed to Buckingham's position as Lord High Constable of England. Whilst Stanley might have had no other option than to act as Richard's loyal subject, it is conceivable that he may himself have become involved in the uprising. His wife, Margaret Beaufort, was a key conspirator, having brokered the marriage alliance between Edward IV's daughter Elizabeth of York and her son Henry Tudor.

Indeed, it was only by giving a solemn undertaking to Richard to keep his wife in custody and to end her intrigues that Stanley saved her from attainder and disgrace and presumably his own position at the same time. Richard was evidently well aware of the threat from this quarter since in the summer of 1485, when Stanley sought permission to leave the court and return to his northern fastness of Lathom, the king insisted that his son, George Stanley, Lord Strange, take his place at court as a token for his father's good behaviour.

== The Battle of Bosworth ==
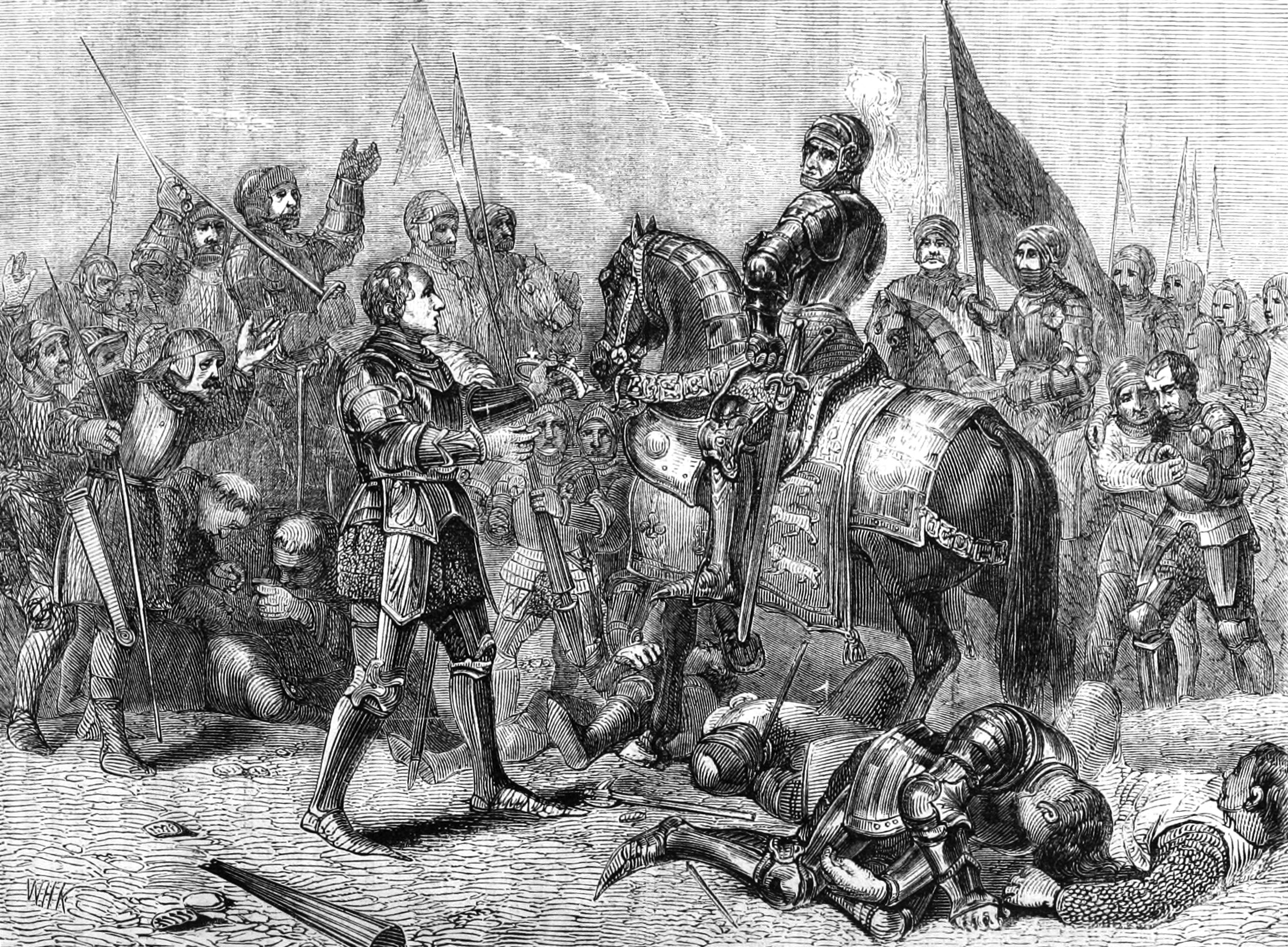
Finding Richard's circlet after the battle, Lord Stanley hands it to Henry.

The Stanleys had been communicating with the exiled Henry Tudor for some time and Tudor's strategy of landing in Wales and heading east into central England depended on the acquiescence of Sir William Stanley, as Chamberlain of Chester and north Wales, and by extension on that of Lord Stanley himself. On hearing of the invasion, Richard ordered the two Stanleys to raise the men of the region in readiness to oppose the invader. However, once it was clear that Tudor was marching unopposed through Wales, Richard ordered Lord Stanley to join him without delay. According to the Croyland Chronicle, although Lord Stanley excused himself on the grounds of illness, the 'sweating sickness', by now Richard had firm evidence of the Stanleys' complicity. After an unsuccessful bid to escape from court, Lord Strange confessed that he and his uncle, Sir William Stanley, had conspired with Henry Tudor. Richard proclaimed him a traitor, and let it be known that Strange's life was a hostage for his father's loyalty in the coming conflict. Indeed, Richard allegedly issued orders for Strange's execution on the battlefield, although in the event these were never carried out. Lord Stanley's response to Richard's threat was reportedly laconic: "Sire, I have other sons".

Three armies followed each other into the midlands: Lord Stanley and his forces; then Sir William Stanley; and finally Henry Tudor and a host comprising Tudor retainers, dispossessed Lancastrian exiles and many men of Wales and Cheshire. Lord Stanley may have secretly met with Henry on the eve of the battle, but when the Stanleyites arrived south of the village of Market Bosworth on 22 August they took up a position independent of both the royal forces and the rebel army. In effect, the two brothers played similar roles to those they had played at the Battle of Blore Heath over a quarter of a century earlier. Lord Stanley took no direct part in the action but stood unmoving between the two armies and it was Sir William's decisive intervention that gave Henry the victory. After the despatch of Richard, who had gone into battle crowned, Polydore Vergil records that the fallen coronet was retrieved and placed by Lord Stanley on his stepson's head before his cheering troops, thereby emphasizing the critical role the Stanleys had played in bringing Henry Tudor to the throne.

== Further prizes ==
Henry demonstrated his gratitude to his "right dearly beloved father" by creating him Earl of Derby on 27 October 1485, and the following year confirmed him in office as Lord High Constable of England and High Steward of the Duchy of Lancaster, besides granting him other estates and offices. In 1486 Stanley also stood as godfather to Henry's eldest son, Arthur, Prince of Wales. Even so, at the time of the Lambert Simnel rising of 1487, there may have been some concern that the Stanleys were again hedging their bets, and "there was relief in the royal host when the Stanleyites came in at Nottingham".

The aftermath of the Battle of Stoke, which crushed this rising, brought still further rewards for Stanley – notably the lands forfeited by Viscount Lovell, Sir Thomas Pilkington, and Sir Thomas Broughton in Lancashire and elsewhere. In 1489, the Stanleys again made a notable contribution to the army raised by Henry to suppress a rising in Yorkshire. Less successfully, Stanley's brother William unwisely supported the later pretender Perkin Warbeck, and was, at last, executed for treason in 1495.

== Dominance of North-West England ==
Throughout his career, alongside the main performance of national events, the preservation and enhancement of Stanley's own role as regional magnate was a very important sideshow. Change of regime never really weakened his grip on the key offices of Chester and Lancaster and throughout his life, Stanley consolidated the legacy he had inherited from his father and extended his hegemony and that of his family across the north-west. Given the range of his office-holding both regionally and at court, he did not need to draw ruinously on his own resources to dispense patronage on a grand scale and he was active in the arbitration of local disputes; even state matters were regularly referred for his personal adjudication. That said, 'good lordship' also had its harder face and the Stanleys brooked no opposition and tolerated few rivals in their areas of dominance.

== Death ==
Stanley died at Lathom, Lancashire on 29 July 1504, and was buried in the family chapel in Burscough Priory, near Ormskirk in Lancashire, surrounded by the tombs of his parents and others of his ancestors. He had been predeceased by his eldest son and heir, George Stanley, Lord Strange by a matter of months and was succeeded as Earl by his grandson, Thomas Stanley, 2nd Earl of Derby. "In his will of 28 July 1504 he ordained masses for the souls of himself, his wives, parents, ancestors, children, siblings, and, ever the good lord, 'them that have died in the service of my lord my father or of me'”.

== Marriages and children ==
He married twice:

Arms of Neville: Gules, a saltire argent

Firstly, in the chapel of Middleham Castle, Yorkshire, by royal license dated 1451, to Eleanor Neville (d.1472), daughter of Richard Neville, 5th Earl of Salisbury, and Alice Montagu, daughter and heiress of Thomas Montagu, 4th Earl of Salisbury. Eleanor died in 1472 and was buried in the Church of St James Garlickhythe in the City of London. By Eleanor, he had eleven children, of whom three attained positions of great status:

- John Stanley, eldest son and heir apparent, died young.
- George Stanley, 9th Baron Strange (1460–1503), KG, jure uxoris 9th Baron Strange, 2nd surviving son and heir apparent, who predeceased his father by one year, leaving a son Thomas Stanley, 2nd Earl of Derby.
- Richard Stanley, 3rd son, died young.
- Edward Stanley, 1st Baron Monteagle (1462–1524), KG.
- James Stanley (1465–1515), Bishop of Ely.
- Thomas Stanley, died in 1475.
- William Stanley, died young.
- Anne Stanley, died young.
- Alice Stanley, died young.
- Katherine Stanley, died young.
- Agnes Stanley, died young.

Arms of Beaufort: Royal arms of King Edward III within a bordure compony argent and azure

Secondly, shortly before 12 June 1472, he married Lady Margaret Beaufort, (1441/3-1509), daughter of John Beaufort, 1st Duke of Somerset (c.1403-1444), KG, a legitimised son of John of Gaunt (1340–1399) (third surviving son of King Edward III) and his mistress Katherine Swynford. Lady Margaret Beaufort was the widow successively of Edmund Tudor, Earl of Richmond (d.1456), by whom she was the mother of Henry Tudor, who in 1485 became King Henry VII (1485–1509); and secondly of Sir Henry Stafford (d.1471). Without issue.

== Illegitimate children ==
He is also said to have had an illegitimate son, John, who in 1476 became Keeper of Shotwick Park in Cheshire, but was unrecognised in official pedigrees. He seems to have died in 1477.

== Legacy ==
At his death, Lord Stanley could look back on a career of forty-five years of political success amid the challenging circumstances. He had not only escaped the bloody fate of his political contemporaries, including his brother, but on top of the patrimony he inherited from his father, he acquired huge estates and national offices, the Garter and an earldom. These, and his closeness to successive royal families – whom he could count amongst his kith and kin by several different connections – made him a figure of power and influence. Under his leadership, the north-west escaped the worst horrors of decades of civil war that devastated other parts of England and his family "helped bring a degree of cultivation and refinement to the north-west". Their patronage underpinned the careers of a number of young Lancashire men, including William Smyth, Hugh Oldham, and Christopher Urswick, who went on to become pillars of the Tudor church and state.

The senior line of the descendants of Thomas Stanley and Eleanor Neville continued to hold the Earldom of Derby until the death of James Stanley, 10th Earl of Derby in 1736. The title then passed to a junior branch of the family, the Baronets Stanley of Bickerstaffe, descended from Sir James Stanley, younger brother of Thomas Stanley, 2nd Earl of Derby. This branch still holds the title today. Edward Stanley, born in 1962, became 19th Earl of Derby in 1994. (John Stanley a younger brother of Thomas Stanley, 1st Earl of Derby was the ancestor of the Barons Stanley of Alderley.)

== References in Shakespeare ==
In the history plays of William Shakespeare, Lord Stanley features in a pivotal role throughout the play Richard III as an initially loyal but troubled courtier and royal official whose misgivings as to Richard's true nature lead him towards plotting regime change in favor of his stepson Henry Tudor, even to the point of defecting to the Tudor Army during the Battle of Bosworth Field and knowingly putting the life of his legitimate heir, whom Richard is holding as a hostage, and who is in danger of being murdered. Richard III is believed to have been written during 1592–93. At this time, it is thought Shakespeare may already have been writing for Lord Strange's Men, the company of Ferdinando Stanley, Lord Strange, later the 5th Earl of Derby. (It is certain that his actors were members of the company, and Shakespeare himself was formally listed as a member by 1594). As such, the Stanleys would effectively have been patrons of this work. This was a relationship that may have been continued, as A Midsummer Night's Dream is thought to have been possibly first performed at the wedding celebrations of William Stanley, 6th Earl of Derby in 1595.

== Notes ==
Political offices
| Preceded by The Duke of Buckingham | Lord High Constable; 1483–1504 | Succeeded by The Duke of Buckingham |
Peerage of England
| New creation | Earl of Derby; 1485–1504 | Succeeded by Thomas Stanley |
| Preceded by Thomas Stanley | Baron Stanley; 1459–1504 | Succeeded by Thomas Stanley |
