= Butterwick, Lincolnshire =

Village and civil parish in the Borough of Boston, Lincolnshire, England

Coordinates: 52.983220°N 0.064781°E

Butterwick
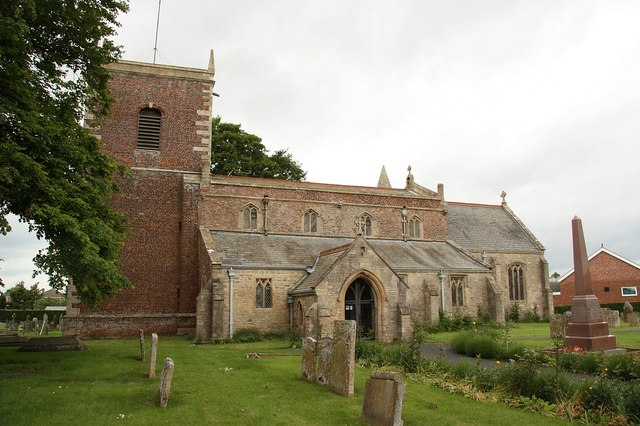
- Church of St Andrew, Butterwick

- Location within Lincolnshire
- Population: 1,365 (2021 census)
- OS grid reference: TF387448
  - London: 100 mi (160 km) S
- Civil parish: Butterwick
- District: Boston
- Shire county: Lincolnshire
- Region: East Midlands
- Country: England
- Sovereign state: United Kingdom
- Post town: Boston
- Postcode district: PE22
- Police: Lincolnshire
- Fire: Lincolnshire
- Ambulance: East Midlands
- UK Parliament: Boston and Skegness

Butterwick is a village and civil parish in the Borough of Boston, Lincolnshire, England, It is situated approximately 3 miles (5 km) east from the market town of Boston.

Butterwick is one of eighteen civil parishes which, together with Boston, form the Borough of Boston local government arrangement, in place since a reorganisation of 1 April 1974, which resulted from the Local Government Act 1972. The parish forms part of the Coastal electoral ward.

Hitherto, the parish had formed part of Boston Rural District in the Parts of Holland. Holland was one of the three divisions (formally known as parts) of the traditional county of Lincolnshire. Since the Local Government Act 1888, Holland had been, in most respects, a county in itself.

On the nearby coast, Freiston Shore, is a wildlife reserve covering approximately 1,400 acres (570 ha) of brackish lagoon, and a natural and reconstituted salt marsh.

The name comes from the Old English "butere" and "wic" meaning a meeting place, or a butter specialised farm.

Butterwick Grade I listed Anglican church is dedicated to St Andrew. It contains Early English style arcades and font. In 1916 Cox reported that an ancient sycamore, planted in 1653, stood in the churchyard.

Ordnance survey maps from the 1920s show an agricultural tramway network running west from the village in a u-shape to Butterwick Grange. Such tramways often used WW1 narrow gauge trench railway equipment to allow year around access to soft fenland fields.

Butterwick Mill, a Grade II listed tower mill built in 1871, has been partially restored by Lincolnshire County Council.

The village also has a public house (The Five Bells), a Church of England primary school, fish and chip shop, park, and small businesses.

Year	Population
1801	229
1811	240
1821	482
1831	504
1841	579
1851	625
1881	533
1891	473
1901	473
1911	523
1921	498
1931	507
1941	N/A (World War II)
1951	563
1961	552
2001	1,403
2011	1,302
2021	1,365
