= Rosalind Howard, Countess of Carlisle =

English promoter of temperance and women's political rights (1845–1921)

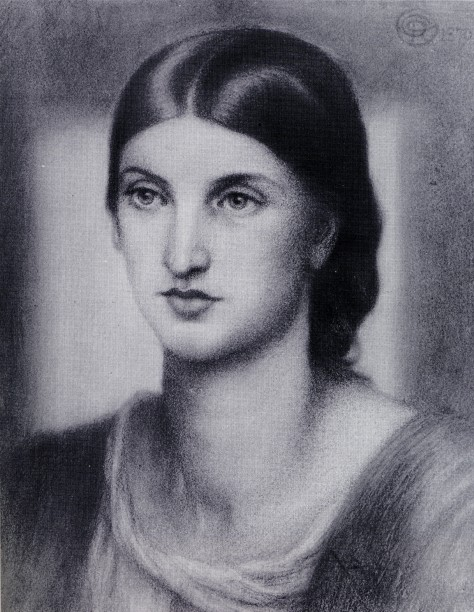
Portrait of Howard made on 25 June 1870 by Dante Gabriel Rossetti and currently owned by her great-great-grandson George Howard, 13th Earl of Carlisle

Rosalind Frances Howard, Countess of Carlisle (née Stanley; 20 February 1845 – 12 August 1921), known as the Radical Countess, was an English aristocrat and activist for women's political rights and temperance movement. She was a member of the Stanley and Howard families.

== Family ==
The Countess of Carlisle was born in 1845 at Grosvenor Crescent, Belgravia, the tenth and last child of the Whig politician Hon. Edward Stanley, and the women's education campaigner Hon. Henrietta Stanley. Her father was the eldest son of John Stanley, 1st Baron Stanley of Alderley and his wife Lady Maria, daughter of the Earl of Sheffield. In 1848, her father was raised to the peerage as Baron Eddisbury and two years later succeeded to his father's title, Baron Stanley of Alderley.

She was educated at home by private tutors. The Stanley family was exceptionally diverse in terms of religious convictions: Lord and Lady Stanley were high-church Anglicans, their eldest son Henry was a Muslim, their third daughter Maude was a low-church Anglican, their youngest son Algernon became a Roman Catholic bishop, their penultimate daughter Kate leaned towards atheism, while Rosalind herself identified as an agnostic.

== Marriage ==
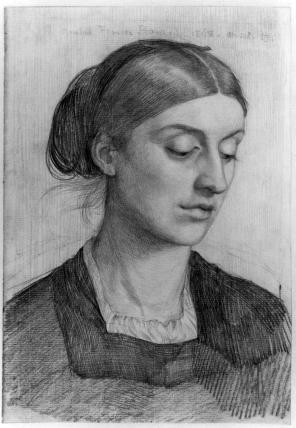
Rosalind Howard portrayed by her husband George in 1868.

On 4 October 1864, she married the painter George Howard, who became an active Liberal MP from 1879. She took part in election campaigns of her husband and father-in-law Charles by canvassing, but refrained from speaking publicly, which was considered improper for a woman. In sharp contrast to her moderate husband, however, Howard soon joined the radical left, denouncing William Ewart Gladstone's occupation of Egypt and campaigning for women's suffrage. She once responded to criticism of herself by saying: "Fanatics have done a lot of the world's work, and I don't mind being classed with the fanatics."

In its early days, the marriage was close and filled with romance. George showered Rosalind with love letters and nude sketches, but the couple gradually drifted apart. They shared a dislike for alcohol, but little else; when the Liberal Party split on the issue of Irish home rule, which Rosalind supported, George decided to side with his cousin, the Duke of Devonshire, and the Liberal Unionist Party. Due to their personal and political disagreements, the Howards spent most of their married life separated, with Rosalind preferring to stay at their country houses, Castle Howard and her favourite home, Naworth Castle.

== Views and causes ==
Despite being plagued by poor health, Howard made use of her organisational skills. She joined Liberal Party women's associations and the temperance movement, involved herself in the management of the extensive family estates and took part in local government. She took the temperance pledge in 1881 and started requiring teetotalism from her tenants and closing down public houses on her estates the next year. Howard gained further credit in 1889 when her husband succeeded his uncle William as 9th Earl of Carlisle, thereby also inheriting the family fortune, and she became known as Countess of Carlisle. In 1891, a United Kingdom Alliance official convinced Lady Carlisle to speak on the subject of temperance at a drawing-room meeting of women. She soon became a successful platform speaker and vice-president of the United Kingdom Alliance, as well as president of the North of England Temperance League in 1892.

In 1890, Lady Carlisle became a member of the Women's Liberal Federation and persuaded the organisation to support extending the suffrage to all women, but denounced Pankhurst suffragettes' violent methods. She presided over the federation from 1894 until 1902 and again from 1906 until 1915. She was elected president of the British Women's Temperance Association in 1903 and president of the World's Woman's Christian Temperance Association in 1906, retaining both offices until her death. Lady Carlisle disagreed with the policy of her predecessor, Lady Henry Somerset, and Thomas Palmer Whittaker, who, among other things, advocated compensating licence holders who lost their livelihoods due to temperance.

The Countess of Carlisle allied herself with a small group of Liberal MPs, including her son Geoffrey, her son-in-law Charles Henry Roberts, her secretary Leifchild Leif-Jones and her neighbour Sir Wilfrid Lawson. The Good Templars supported her policies, but she refused invitations to join the mostly working-class and lower middle-class organisation.

When Lady Carlisle's daughter, Lady Dorothy Georgiana Howard, was attending Girton College, her closest college friends included archaeologist Gisela Richter and future candidate for Roman Catholic Sainthood Anna Abrikosova. During vacations, both were honoured guests of Lady Carlisle at Castle Howard and Naworth Castle.

Although she had opposed the South African War, Lady Carlisle firmly supported British resistance to the Germans in the First World War. The temperance movement and the Liberal Party had divided by then, leaving her without significant political influence. She supported H. H. Asquith despite his unwillingness to promote prohibition and opposed David Lloyd George's proposal to nationalise the drink trade during wartime. Though she worked hard to improve the working-class people's living conditions, she was an élitist who resented their role in democracy.

== Issue ==
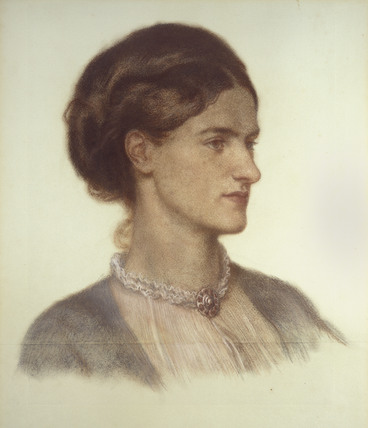
Dante Gabriel Rossetti's depiction of Howard on grey-green paper in 1870

The Carlisles had 11 children:

- Lady Mary Henrietta Howard (20 July 1865 – 2 September 1956), who married George Gilbert Aimé Murray, son of Sir Terence Aubrey Murray, in 1889. They were the parents of Rosalind Murray, Basil Murray, and Stephen Murray.
- Charles James Stanley Howard, 10th Earl of Carlisle (1867–1912), married Rhoda Ankaret L'Estrange, eldest daughter of Col. Paget Walter L'Estrange.
- Lady Cecilia Maude Howard (23 April 1868 - 6 May 1947), married Charles Henry Roberts, the Under-Secretary of State for India, in 1891. They were the parents of Winifred Nicholson and Wilfrid Roberts.
- Hon. Hubert George Lyulph Howard (3 April 1871 – 2 September 1898), killed at the Battle of Omdurman while serving as a correspondent for The Times
- Capt. Hon. Christopher Edward Howard (2 June 1873 – 1 September 1896), 8th King's Royal Irish Hussars, died of pneumonia at Slains Castle after contracting a cold at a shooting party
- Hon. Oliver Howard FSA FRGS (14 March 1875 – 20 September 1908), diplomat, who married Muriel Stephenson (1876–1952) in 1900. After his death of fever in Northern Nigeria, where he was British resident, his widow married Arthur Meade, 5th Earl of Clanwilliam.
- Hon. Geoffrey William Algernon Howard (1877–1935), married Hon. Ethel Christian Methuen, eldest daughter of Paul Methuen, 3rd Baron Methuen.
- Lt. Hon. Michael Francis Stafford Howard (23 January 1880 – 9 September 1917), married Nora Hensman in 1911. He was killed in action in the First World War.
- Lady Dorothy Georgiana Howard (6 August 1881 – 14 September 1968), married Francis Robert Eden, 6th Baron Henley (1877–1962) in 1913. They were the parents of Michael Eden, 7th Baron Henley.
- Elizabeth Dacre Ethel Howard (12 March 1883 – 17 July 1883), died in infancy. There is a terra cotta effigy by Sir Edgar Boehm on her tomb at Lanercost Priory.
- Lady Aurea Fredeswyde Howard (4 October 1884 – 15 January 1972), married Denyss Chamberlaine Wace in 1923; he was granted an annulment in 1926 on grounds that the marriage was never consummated. She married Maj. Thomas MacLeod OBE in 1928.

== Death and legacy ==
By the time Lord Carlisle died in 1911, Lady Carlisle's autocracy had estranged her from most of her children and friends. She strongly disapproved of her daughters' flirtatiousness and bitterly argued with her eldest son Charles, a Tory politician. For several years, Lady Carlisle refused to speak to her daughter Lady Dorothy due to her marriage to the brewer Francis Henley (afterwards Baron Henley). Lady Henley later claimed that her mother was privately a tyrant, despite appearing at her best in public.

Her husband left most of the family property to her for life and instructed her to divide it among their children upon her death. The Countess of Carlisle died on 12 August 1921 at her home in Kensington Palace Gardens, having survived seven of her children, and was cremated at Golders Green Crematorium four days later. Her ashes were interred alongside her husband's at Lanercost Priory on 18 August, with Geoffrey as the chief mourner. The surviving children found her last will and testament to be unfair and agreed to redivide the inheritance. Her daughter Lady Cecilia succeeded her as president of the British Women's Temperance Association.

== In popular culture ==
Lady Carlisle served as a model for Lady Britomart in George Bernard Shaw's play Major Barbara.

== Arms ==
Coat of arms of Rosalind Howard, Countess of Carlisle
Escutcheon Arms of Howard of Carlisle (Quarterly of six 1st Gules a bend between six crosses-crosslet finchée Argent on the bend an escutcheon Argent charged with a demi-lion pierced through the mouth with an arrow within a double tressure flory counterflory all Gules and above the escutcheon a mullet Sable for difference 2nd Gules three lions passant guardant Or and a label of three-points Argent 3rd Chequy Or and Azure 4th Gules a lion rampant Argent 5th Gules three escallops Argent 6th barry of eight Argent and Azure three chaplets of roses Proper) impaling arms of Stanley of Alderley (Argent on a bend Azure three stags’ heads cabossed Or a crescent for difference).

== Bibliography ==
- Dorothy Henley (1958) Rosalind Howard, Countess of Carlisle (Hogarth Press)
- Charles Roberts (1962), The Radical Countess (Steel Bros)

Non-profit organization positions
Preceded by Lady Henry Somerset	President of the British Women's Temperance Association; 1903–1921	Succeeded by Lady Cecilia Roberts
Party political offices
Preceded by Countess of Aberdeen	President of the Women's Liberal Federation; 1894–1902	Succeeded by Countess of Aberdeen
Preceded by Countess of Aberdeen	President of the Women's Liberal Federation; 1906–1915	Succeeded by Laura McLaren
