= Henrietta Stanley, Baroness Stanley of Alderley =

British educational campaigner and hostess (1807–1895)

The Right Honourable The Lady Stanley of Alderley
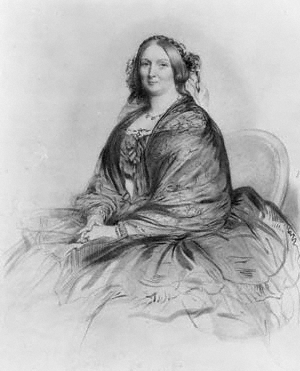
- Lady Stanley of Alderley in 1860, by Richard James Lane
- Born: Henrietta Maria Dillon-Lee; 21 December 1807; Halifax, Nova Scotia, Canada
- Died: 16 February 1895 (aged 87)
- Spouse: Edward Stanley (m. 1826; died 1869)
- Children: 10, including Henry, Maude, Edward, Katharine, and Rosalind
- Father: Henry Dillon, 13th Viscount Dillon
- Relatives: Bertrand Russell (grandson); Dominick Browne, 1st Baron Oranmore and Browne (uncle)

Henrietta Maria Stanley, Baroness Stanley of Alderley (née Dillon-Lee; 21 December 1807 – 16 February 1895), was a British Canadian-born political hostess and campaigner for the education of women in England.

She was a founder and benefactor of Girton College at the University of Cambridge, but also a signatory of a petition against women's suffrage. She was the maternal grandmother of philosopher Bertrand Russell.

== Early life and family ==
Born in Halifax, Nova Scotia, Lady Stanley was the eldest child of Henry Dillon, 13th Viscount Dillon, and Henrietta Browne, the sister of Dominick Browne, 1st Baron Oranmore and Browne. She was a descendant of both Charles II (by his mistress Barbara Villiers) and James II of England (by his mistress Catherine Sedley). Her ancestors were Roman Catholic and had had pronounced Jacobite leanings; one of them was Maréchal de camp Arthur Dillon, a supporter of the Old Pretender who lived in exile in France. Her grandfather Charles Dillon, 12th Viscount Dillon eventually converted to Anglicanism in 1767.

In the 1790s her father served as an officer in the "Catholic Irish Brigade" that had been partly stationed in Nova Scotia. In 1814, Henrietta and her family moved to Florence, capital of the Grand Duchy of Tuscany, where she attended the receptions of Princess Louise of Stolberg-Gedern, the widow of the Young Pretender. Her non-English upbringing was prominent and her grandson, the philosopher Bertrand Russell, commented:

My grandmother's outlook, throughout her life, was in some ways more Continental than English. She was always downright, free from prudery, and eighteenth-century rather than Victorian in her conversation. Her French and Italian were faultless, and she was passionately interested in Italian unity.

In Florence she met Edward Stanley and married him on 7 October 1826. She became Baroness Eddisbury when her husband was created a peer in 1848. Two years later he succeeded as Baron Stanley of Alderley, by which title the couple was subsequently known. She corresponded with her mother-in-law, Maria, who had received an exceptional education. Maria wrote to her to applaud that she had admonished her son John Stanley for calling Indian people, "niggers".

== Education campaigns ==
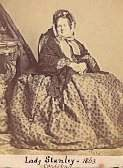
Lady Stanley of Alderley

Lady Stanley cultivated friendships with Thomas Carlyle, F. D. Maurice, and, from 1861, Benjamin Jowett. She presided over an intellectual and political salon, and was one of the original 'lady visitors' of Queen's College, London, founded by Maurice in 1848. This marked her stronger involvement in the campaign for the education of women and her decision to defend, as she later put it, "the right of women to the highest culture hitherto reserved to men".

She proceeded to take part in the campaign whose aim was to secure the admission of women to the university local examinations. In 1867, she turned down an offer to become a member of the committee planning a women's university college, saying that "it is not liked to see my name before the public". The death of her husband on 16 June 1869, however, left her more free to pursue her campaign. The same year, along with Emily Davies and Barbara Bodichon, Lady Stanley founded Girton College. She soon became a prominent supporter of the National Union for the Improvement of Women's Education (1871), the Girls' Public Day School Company that became the Girls Day School Trust (1872) and the London School of Medicine for Women (1874).

In early 1872 she was again invited to participate more formally in the administration of Girton, which she now accepted, and she joined the building subcommittee. The project, seen as daring and even scandalous, benefited from her social position; Lady Stanley considered "social position, good sense and power of governing and conciliating" necessary for the mistress of the college. She donated both money and time to Girton, standing in as its mistress during the illness of Annie Austin, and providing £1,000 for the establishment of its first library, which was built in 1884 and called the Stanley Library. One of the few executive committee members who dared confront Davies, Lady Stanley vehemently opposed the construction of a chapel, and instead favoured improving staff salaries and equipment. In 1888, she helped found Sydenham High Junior and Senior Schools with Maria Grey, Mary Gurney and Emily Shirreff.

== Politics and character ==
The Baroness Stanley of Alderley had great influence in social and political circles. While he was Patronage Secretary, Edward Stanley was described by Lord Palmerston as "joint whip with Mrs Stanley". She fell out with Prime Minister William Ewart Gladstone over the issue of home rule and became closely associated with Women's Liberal Unionist Association. Along with Lady Randolph Churchill and the fellow female education campaigner Lady Frederick Cavendish, among others, she was a signatory of an appeal against female suffrage in June 1889.

Bertrand Russell, her grandson, feared her ridicule and described her as "an eighteenth century type, rationalistic and unimaginative, keen on enlightenment, and contemptuous of Victorian goody-goody priggery". "Grandmama Stanley at Dover Street", according to Russell, "had a considerable contempt for everything that she regarded as silly". She died at her home in Dover Street, which she had shared with her unmarried daughter Maude.

== Issue ==
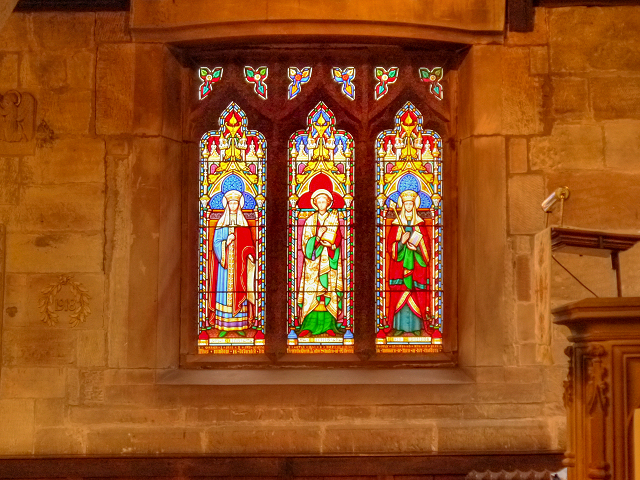
Stained glass window at St Mary's Church, Nether Alderley in memory of Lord and Lady Stanley's daughters Margaret Olga, Cecilia, and Mary Ethelfreda Stanley, who died young

Lord and Lady Stanley of Alderley had 12 children:

- Henry Edward John, 3rd Baron Stanley of Alderley (1827–1903)
- Hon. Alice Margaret (20 August 1828 – 19 May 1910), married Augustus Pitt Rivers
- Hon. Henrietta Blanche (3 July 1830 – 5 January 1921), later Countess of Airlie, wife of David Ogilvy, 10th Earl of Airlie (1826–81); a grandmother of Clementine Churchill, and a great-grandmother of the Mitford sisters
- Cecilia (3 July 1831 – 22 September 1839), died from head injury after falling from a window in Gosport, Hampshire
- Hon. Maude Alethea (1833–1915), activist for women and children
- Margaret Olga Stanley (1 March 1835 – 27 January 1836), died in infancy
- Lt. Hon. John Constantine (30 September 1836 – 23 April 1878), Grenadier Guards
- Edward Lyulph Stanley, 4th Baron Stanley of Alderley (1839–1925)
- Hon. Katherine Louisa (1842–1874), later Viscountess Amberley, wife of John Russell, Viscount Amberley; mother of the philosopher Bertrand Russell
- Rt. Rev. Hon. Algernon Charles (16 September 1843 – 23 April 1928), Roman Catholic Bishop of Emmaus (in partibus)
- Rosalind Frances (1845–1921), later Countess of Carlisle, became the chatelaine of Castle Howard and a radical temperance campaigner.
- Hon. Mary Ethelfreda Stanley (25 July 1849 – 15 September 1849), died in infancy

Three of their daughters died young. A stained glass window in their memories was erected in 1860 at St Mary's Church, Nether Alderley. On Lord Stanley's tomb in the same church, a brass plaque features an engraving of Lady Stanley and their 12 children.

Lady Stanley's great-great-granddaughter Nancy Mitford wrote of the favouritism she showed in treating her children. Her eldest son, Henry, was her favourite, while her eldest daughter, Alice, was her least favourite and treated accordingly.

=== Descendants ===
Through her daughter Alice, she was a grandmother of St George Lane Fox-Pitt and Geraldine Grove, and a great-grandmother of George Pitt-Rivers and William Fox-Pitt.

Through her daughter Henrietta, she was a grandmother of Clementine Churchill, David Ogilvy, 11th Earl of Airlie, and Lady Griselda Cheape; a great-grandmother of David Freeman-Mitford, 2nd Baron Redesdale; a great-great-grandmother of Bertram Bowyer, 2nd Baron Denham, Giles Romilly, and Esmond Romilly; and a great-great-great-grandmother of Rupert Mitford, 6th Baron Redesdale.

== Arms ==
Coat of arms of Henrietta Stanley, Baroness Stanley of Alderley
Escutcheon Edward Stanley, 2nd Baron Stanley of Alderley (Argent on a bend Azure three stags' heads cabossed Or a crescent for difference) impaling Henry Dillon, 13th Viscount Dillon (Quarterly 1st & 4th Argent a fess between three crescents Sable 2nd & 3rd Argent a lion rampant Gules debruised by a fess Azure between three crescents Gules).
