= Maude Stanley =

British youth worker and women's welfare activist

The Honourable Maude Stanley
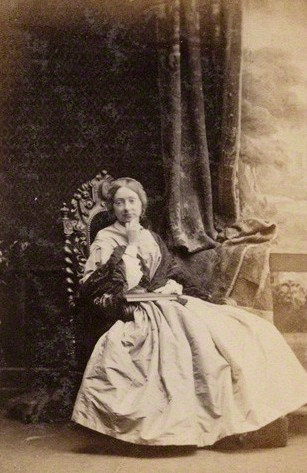
- Stanley on 19 March 1861, by Camille Silvy
- Born: 4 May 1833
- Died: 14 July 1915 (aged 82)

Maude Alethea Stanley (4 May 1833 –14 July 1915) was a British youth work pioneer and women's welfare activist.

== Early life and family ==
Stanley was born at Alderley Park, Chelford in Cheshire, the fourth daughter and fifth of 12 children of the politician Edward Stanley and the women's education campaigner Henrietta Stanley (later Baron and Baroness Stanley of Alderley). In 1834, her paternal grandfather, John Stanley, 1st Baron Stanley of Alderley, wrote a manuscript on philosophy dedicated to his newborn granddaughter and called Alethea's Book.

Stanley shared her family's tolerant and liberal views towards religion – her parents were Anglicans, her eldest brother Henry a convert to Islam, her youngest brother Algernon a Roman Catholic bishop and her youngest sister Rosalind an agnostic. Stanley herself has been described as low church. Her youngest sisters, Katharine Russell, Viscountess Amberley, and Rosalind Howard, Countess of Carlisle, both campaigned for women's suffrage. It was decided that Stanley should remain unmarried, and Lady Amberley assured her sister that their parents and siblings needed her at home. Described by Lady Amberley's son Bertrand Russell as "stern and gloomy Aunt Maude", Stanley doted on her siblings' numerous children. Russell himself thought of her as the perfect aunt and an embodiment of kindness. In his later years, he recalled: "I used to enjoy going to see her when I was a child because she had a parrot that talked, and because she sometimes gave me marrons glacés." In 1894, Stanley took her nephew to visit Monsignor Algernon in Rome.

Stanley's father died in 1869 and the house at Smith Square in London where she lived was inherited by her eldest brother. The next year, Stanley contemplated travelling to the continent to nurse the wounded in the Franco-Prussian War. Following a long trip abroad, she and her mother moved to Dover Street.

== Youth work ==
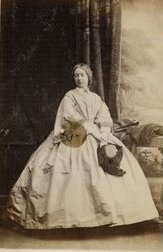
Camille Silvy's albumen print of Maude Stanley

A woman of Stanley's social position was expected to devote time to charity and social work, but her involvement exceeded expectations. She started out as visitor of Five Dials, a now-extinct London slum, where her younger brother Algernon served as a curate, which she considered "old-fashioned" but enabling her to "penetrate into houses where none other could enter".

Stanley's approach gradually became more secular and she started concentrating on youth work. She started opening night schools and clubs for girls, spending much of her income for that purpose. She set out to reach young men and women on the streets and in the courtyards by talking to them, playing cards and gambling. In an attempt to promote inter-club co-operation, she established Girls Club Union in 1880 (which eventually grew into London Youth). Stanley also functioned as Poor Law Guardian, became manager of the Metropolitan Asylums Board in 1884 and governor of the Borough Polytechnic in 1892. In 1890, she wrote Clubs for Working Girls, the first text about young women's clubs, and took a lifelong interest in the welfare of working teenaged girls. The circle of philanthropists she belonged to included Henry Solly and Octavia Hill.

== Death and commemoration ==
Stanley lived with her mother until the latter's death in 1895. The outbreak of the First World War distressed her and caused her to leave London. She died of a heart condition at Alderley Park. The funeral was held at Alderley Park two days later, and was followed by a memorial service at Smith Square. Both Queen Mary and Queen Alexandra sent representatives to the memorial service. Queen Alexandra's wreath was inscribed with: "In memory of dear Miss Stanley and all her many good works. From her devoted Alexandra."

Sir Robert Lorimer designed a memorial to Hon. Maude Stanley in 1916. Its location is unclear.

== Bibliography ==
- Stanley, Maude: Work about the Five Dials Macmillan 1878
- Stanley, Maude: Clubs for Working Girls Macmillan 1890
