= Heawood Hall =

Coordinates: 53.27723°N 2.24586°W

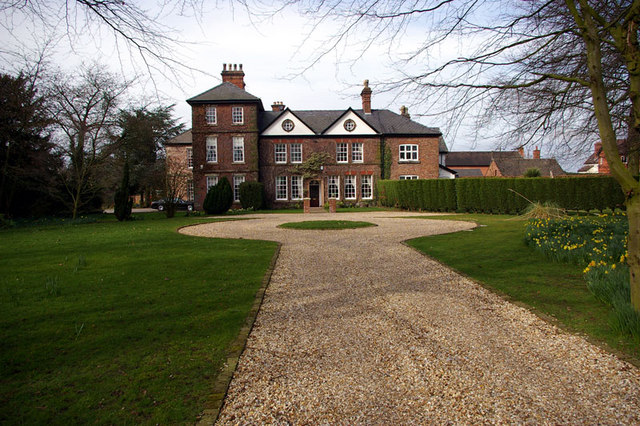
- Interactive map of Heawood Hall

Heawood Hall is a country house, now divided into three houses, southwest of the village of Nether Alderley, Cheshire, England. It originated in the late 17th century; a tall wing was added in the 18th century. Further alterations were made in 1899, and again in the 20th century. It is constructed in red brick with buff sandstone dressings, and is roofed with Welsh slate. Figueirdo and Treuherz describe it as "a complicated and disjointed-looking house". The three houses are named Heawood Chase, Heawood Hall and Heawood House. The building as a whole is recorded in the National Heritage List for England as a designated Grade II listed building.

The construction of the Alderley Edge bypass in 2010 cut off Heawood Hall from its former entry lodge on the (old) A34. Heawood Hall now has a new entry drive from the Frog Lane roundabout at the south end of the Alderley Edge bypass.

Between 2001 and 2005 one of the houses in the complex, consisting of two conjoined, renovated barns, was owned by footballer and UNICEF ambassador David Beckham.

== See also ==
- Listed buildings in Nether Alderley
