= Sir John Thomas Stanley, 6th Baronet =

British landowner and amateur scientist

Sir John Thomas Stanley, 6th Baronet FRSE FSA (26 March 1735 – 29 November 1807) was an 18/19th century British landowner and amateur scientist.

== Life ==
He was born at Alderley Park on 26 March 1735, the eldest son of Sir Edward Stanley, 5th Baronet and his wife, Mary Ward. He succeeded to the baronetcy in August 1755 following the death of his father.

He served in the Royal Court as Gentleman of the Privy Chamber to King George III.

He died on 29 November 1807.

== Family ==
In 1763, he married Margaret Owen, daughter of Hugh Owen of Penrhos.

He was father to John Thomas Stanley, 1st Baron Stanley of Alderley and Bishop Edward Stanley. His daughter, Margaretta Louisa Ann Stanley married General Sir Baldwin Leighton 6th Baronet.

He was grandfather to Arthur Penrhyn Stanley, Dean of Westminster Abbey. He was also great-grandfather to Henry John Adeane, British barrister and MP.

== Portrait ==
He was portrayed in his youth by Philip Mercier. The suit he was wearing on this portrait can be seen in the Gallery of English costume, Platt Hall, Manchester. The suit is mentioned and explained in the book 18th Century embroidery techniques by Gail Marsh.

Baronetage of England
Preceded by Edward Stanley	Baronet (of Alderley Hall); 1755–1807	Succeeded by John Stanley
