= Soss Moss Hall =

Coordinates: 53.27970°N 2.25923°W

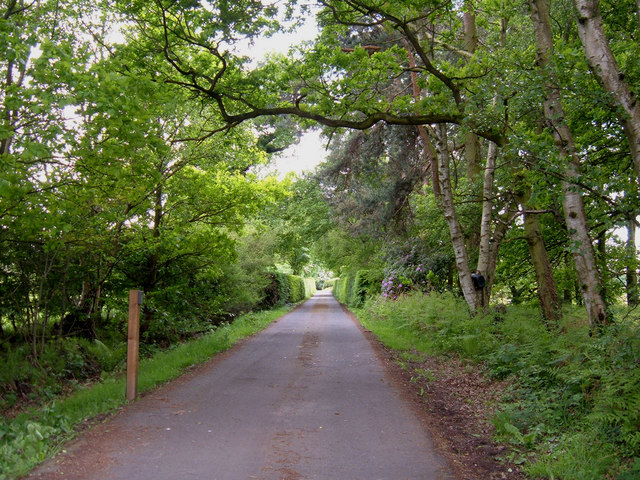
Entrance to Soss Moss Hall © michael ely

Soss Moss Hall is a former manor house in the parish of Nether Alderley, Cheshire, England. It was built in 1583 for Thomas Wyche. The architectural writers Figueirdo and Treuherz consider that, because of duplication of some of the timbers, it was built in two stages. Between 1835 and 1940 the kitchen of the house was used as Nether Alderley Methodist Chapel. The house was extended in the early 17th century and alterations were made during the 20th century. It is a timber-framed building on a sandstone plinth, with some repairs in brick. The infill is partly with brick, and partly with plaster. It is roofed in Kerridge stone slate, with stone ridges. The house has a H-shaped plan. It has two storeys, the north front having three gables, all of which have black-and-white herringbone decoration. On the left side is a massive stone chimney with three stacks, serving three fireplaces; it contains garderobes. The house is recorded in the National Heritage List for England as a designated Grade II* listed building.

== See also ==
- Grade II* listed buildings in Cheshire East
- Listed buildings in Nether Alderley
