= Alderley Old Hall =

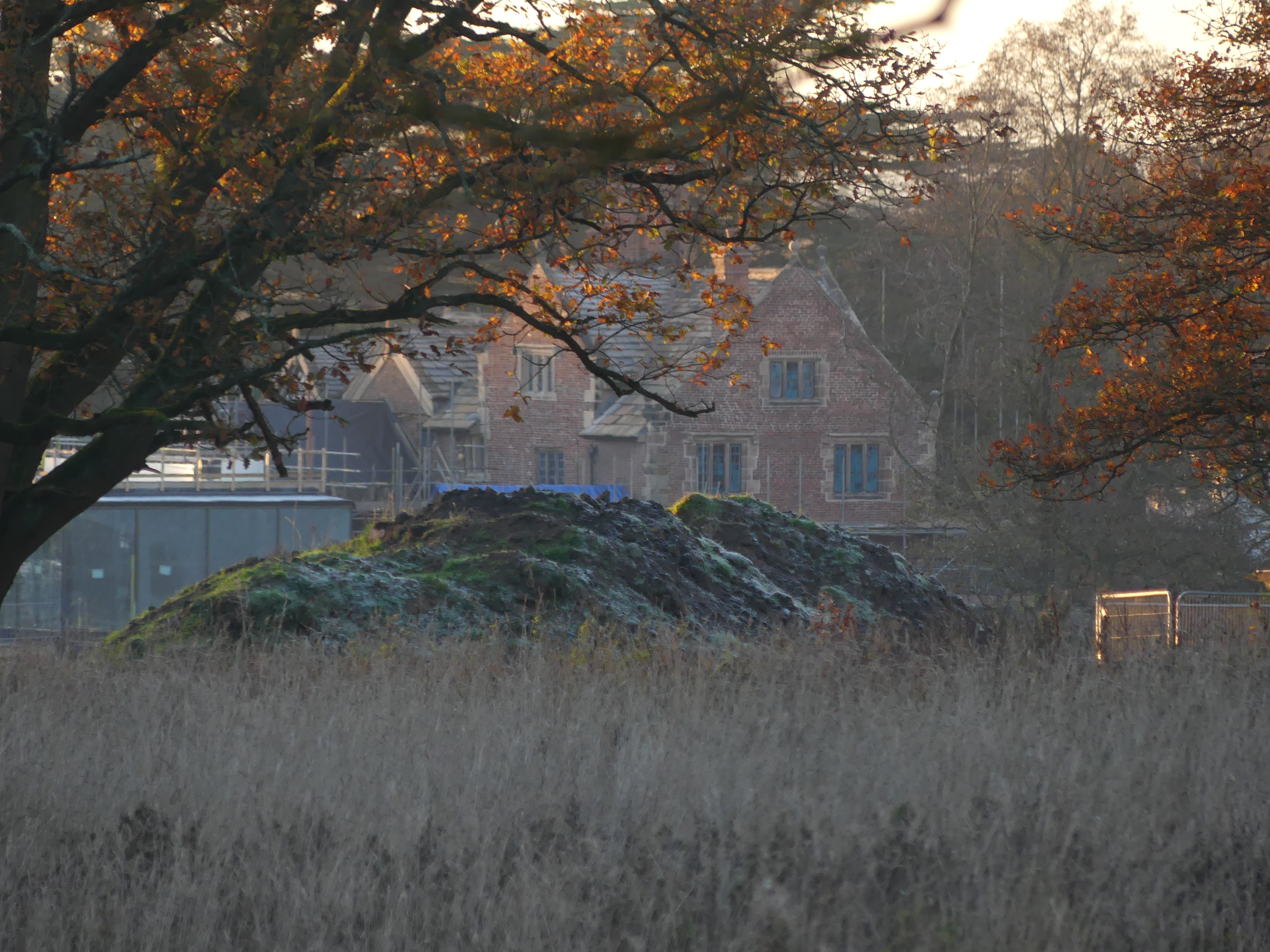

- Location in Cheshire
- 53.28350°N 2.23601°W
- Location: Nether Alderley, Cheshire, England

Listed Building – Grade II*
- Official name: The Old Hall
- Designated: 14 April 1967
- Reference no.: 1139591

Alderley Old Hall is the remaining part of a former 17th-century manor house near the village of Nether Alderley, Cheshire, England. It stands adjacent to the mill pond of Nether Alderley Mill, a loop of which acts as a moat. The hall is recorded in the National Heritage List for England as a designated Grade II* listed building.

It is constructed partly in brick, and partly in timber framing, and represents an addition to the original hall, which was lost in a fire.

== History ==
The Hall was built in Alderley Park in the early 17th century for Sir Thomas Stanley, High Sheriff of Cheshire for 1571–72, who then made it his family seat. Stanley had purchased the manor of Nether Alderley and other lands from Sir Edward Fitton of Gawsworth for £2,000. His son Sir Thomas Stanley, a barrister, was made a baronet at the Restoration, and was High Sheriff of Cheshire in 1630. He made many improvements to the hall, including the construction of a stone-arched gateway at the front, extensive stables and the planting of beech woods near the mere.

Following a severe fire in 1779 the baroque frontage of the hall was demolished and a new hall constructed to the south of the park, which has also since been largely demolished. Alterations were made to the remains of the old hall in 1912 by Edmund Warre and the building remains occupied.

In 2011 the owner committed suicide in the barn after an armed robbery at the premises and financial pressures. The property was valued at £5m.

== See also ==
- Grade II* listed buildings in Cheshire East
- Listed buildings in Nether Alderley
- Alderley Park
