= Gatley Green =

Hamlet in Cheshire, England

Coordinates: 53.285°N 2.247°W

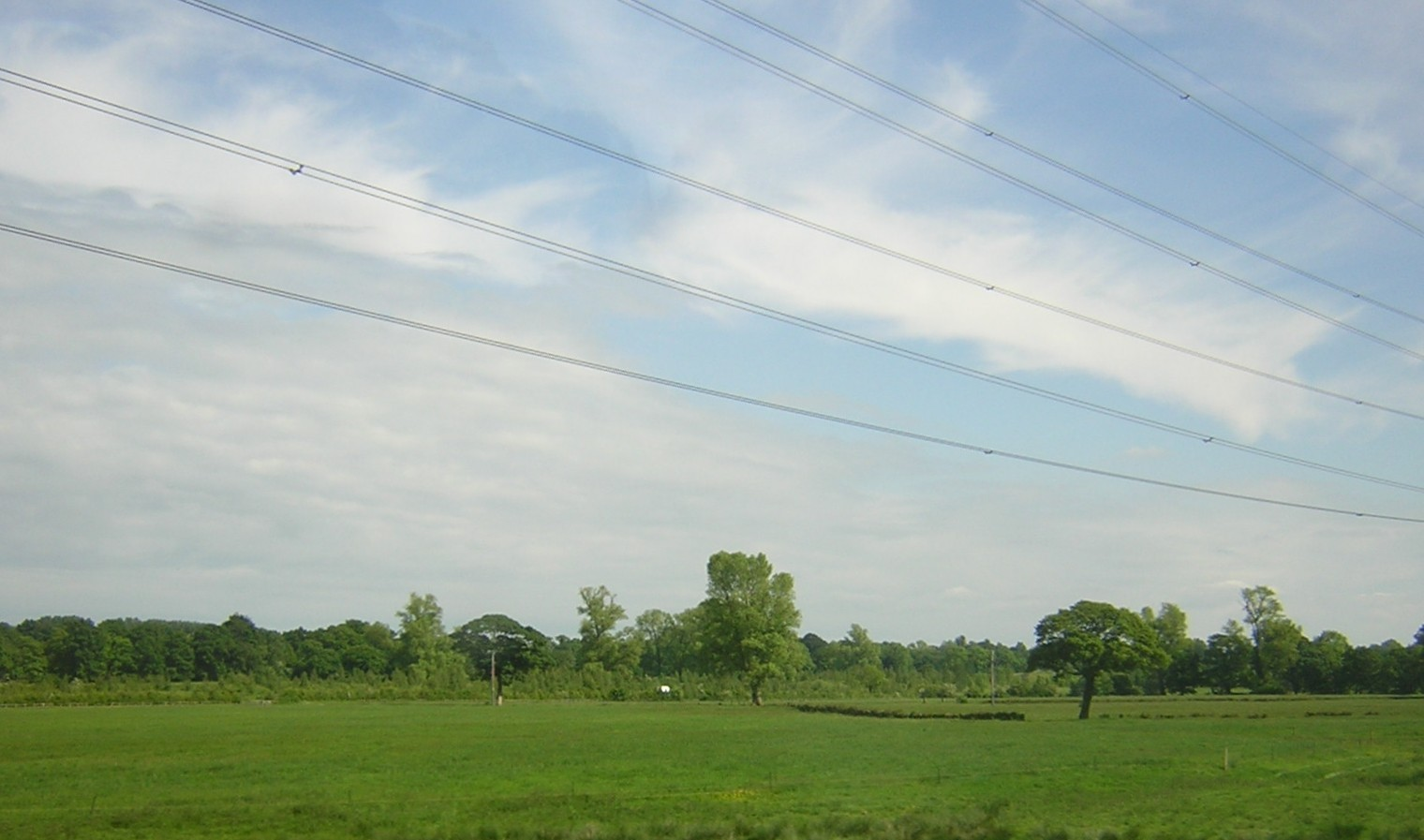
Pylon line, Gatley Green

Gatley Green is a hamlet in the civil parish of Nether Alderley in the unitary authority of Cheshire East and the ceremonial county of Cheshire, England.

It is situated immediately beside the major A34 road. Gatley Green Farmhouse is a mid-18th century Grade II Listed building.
