= St Mary's Church, Nether Alderley =

Coordinates: 53.2820°N 2.2389°W

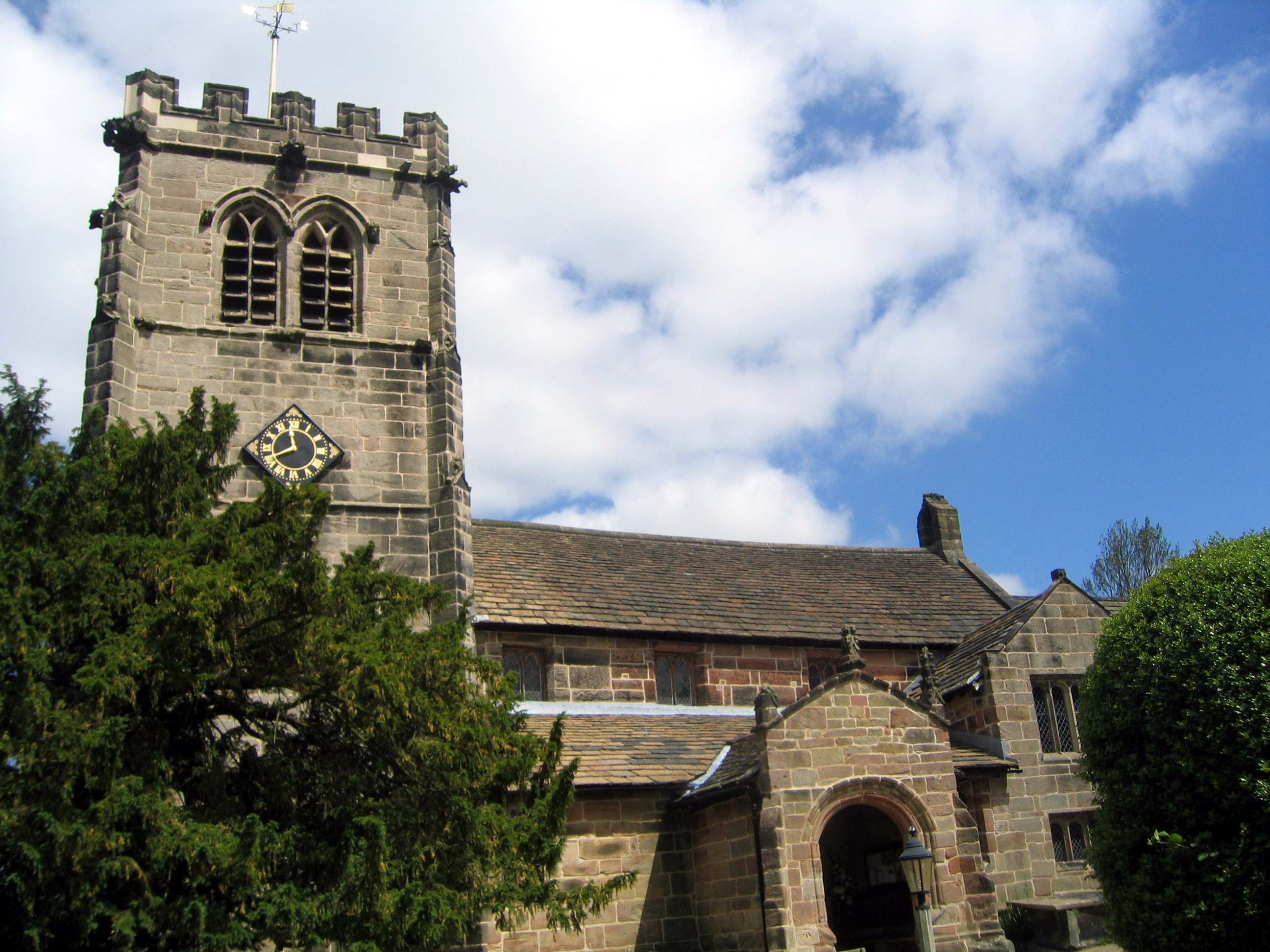
- St Mary's Church, Nether Alderley, from the south in 2008

- Location in Cheshire
- OS grid reference: SJ 842 761
- Location: Nether Alderley, Cheshire
- Country: England
- Denomination: Anglican
- Website: St Mary's Church

History
- Status: Parish church
- Dedication: St Mary

Architecture
- Functional status: Active
- Heritage designation: Grade I
- Designated: 14 April 1967
- Architect(s): Cuffley and Starkey; Paley and Austin (Restorations)
- Architectural type: Church
- Style: Gothic

Specifications
- Materials: Buff and red sandstone Kerridge stone-slate roof

Administration
- Province: York
- Diocese: Chester
- Archdeaconry: Macclesfield
- Deanery: Knutsford
- Parish: Alderley

St Mary's Church is an Anglican church at the end of a lane to the south of the village of Nether Alderley, Cheshire, England. It dates from the 14th century, with later additions and a major restoration in the late-19th century. The church is recorded in the National Heritage List for England as a designated Grade I listed building.

The church was built in the Gothic style, and has historically been associated with the Stanley family of Alderley. Its major features include a fine tower, the Stanley pew which is entered by an outside staircase, a 14th-century font, the western gallery, and monuments to the Lords Stanley of Alderley. The grounds contain a 17th-century former schoolhouse, now used as a parish hall, a medieval church cross, and the Stanley Mausoleum, which dates from 1909. An ancient yew tree stands in the churchyard.

St Mary's is an active parish church in the diocese of Chester, the archdeaconry of Macclesfield, and the deanery of Knutsford. Its benefice is combined with that of St Catherine's, Birtles.

== History ==
The oldest parts of the church date from around 1300, but it is likely that a timber-framed church existed on the site before then. The church's original dedication was to Saint Lawrence, but that was later changed to Saint Mary. A clerestory was added in the 15th century. The tower was built in 1530, and the Stanley pew was added in about 1600. The west gallery, which contained an organ, was installed in 1803. In 1856, the chancel was completely rebuilt, to a design by Cuffley and Starkey, paid for by the Stanley family. The vestry was constructed in 1860. The church was restored between 1877 and 1878 by Paley and Austin; the nave floor was lowered, the pulpit was replaced, plaster was removed from the roof and the walls, and the box pews were replaced by new oak pews. The tower clock, made in 1743, was renovated in 1997. In 2000, the 16th-century wooden bell-frame was strengthened by the addition of a steel frame, and the Stanley pew was restored.

== Architecture ==
=== Exterior ===
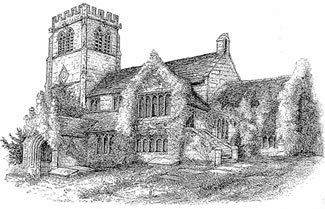
St Mary's Church before the chancel was rebuilt in 1856

St Mary's is built of ashlar buff and red sandstone quarried locally at Alderley Edge, and the roof is of Kerridge stone slates. Its plan consists of a tower at the west end, a four-bay nave with north and south aisles, a chancel with a vestry to its north, and a south porch. Over the north aisle is a dormer window. The tower has diagonal buttresses. Its west door has 14th-century mouldings and above the door is a three-light window. The stage above this contains ringers' windows on the north and west faces and a diamond-shaped clock on the south face. Above these the belfry windows on all faces have two lights. The top of the tower is embattled and contains the bases of eight pinnacles. Below the parapet is a string course with large grotesque gargoyles. At the west end of the nave roof is a bellcote. The Stanley pew projects to the east of the south porch. In the porch are grooves which were cut where arrows were sharpened.

=== Interior ===
The barrel-shaped nave roof dates possibly from the early 16th century. The early 17th-century Stanley pew at the eastern end of the south aisle is at the level of an upper storey, and is entered by a flight of steps from outside the church. Its front is richly carved and displays six panels with coats of arms. Richards states that it is one of the finest of its kind in the country and that it is unique in Cheshire. At the west end of the church is a late-18th-century musicians' gallery, whose front panel has painted coats of arms. The gallery contains the organ which replaces an earlier organ. This was presented by Lady Fabia Stanley in 1875 and was made by Hill and Company of London at a cost of £350 (equivalent to £35,000 in 2025), An oak document chest in the tower has been dated to 1686. The 14th-century font was buried in the churchyard during the Commonwealth, dug up in 1821 and restored to use in the church in 1924. It consists of a plain circular bowl on four short cylindrical columns with moulded bases. Richards considers it to be one of the finest examples of 14th-century work in Cheshire. The church has two old Bibles, a Vinegar Bible and a Breeches Bible.

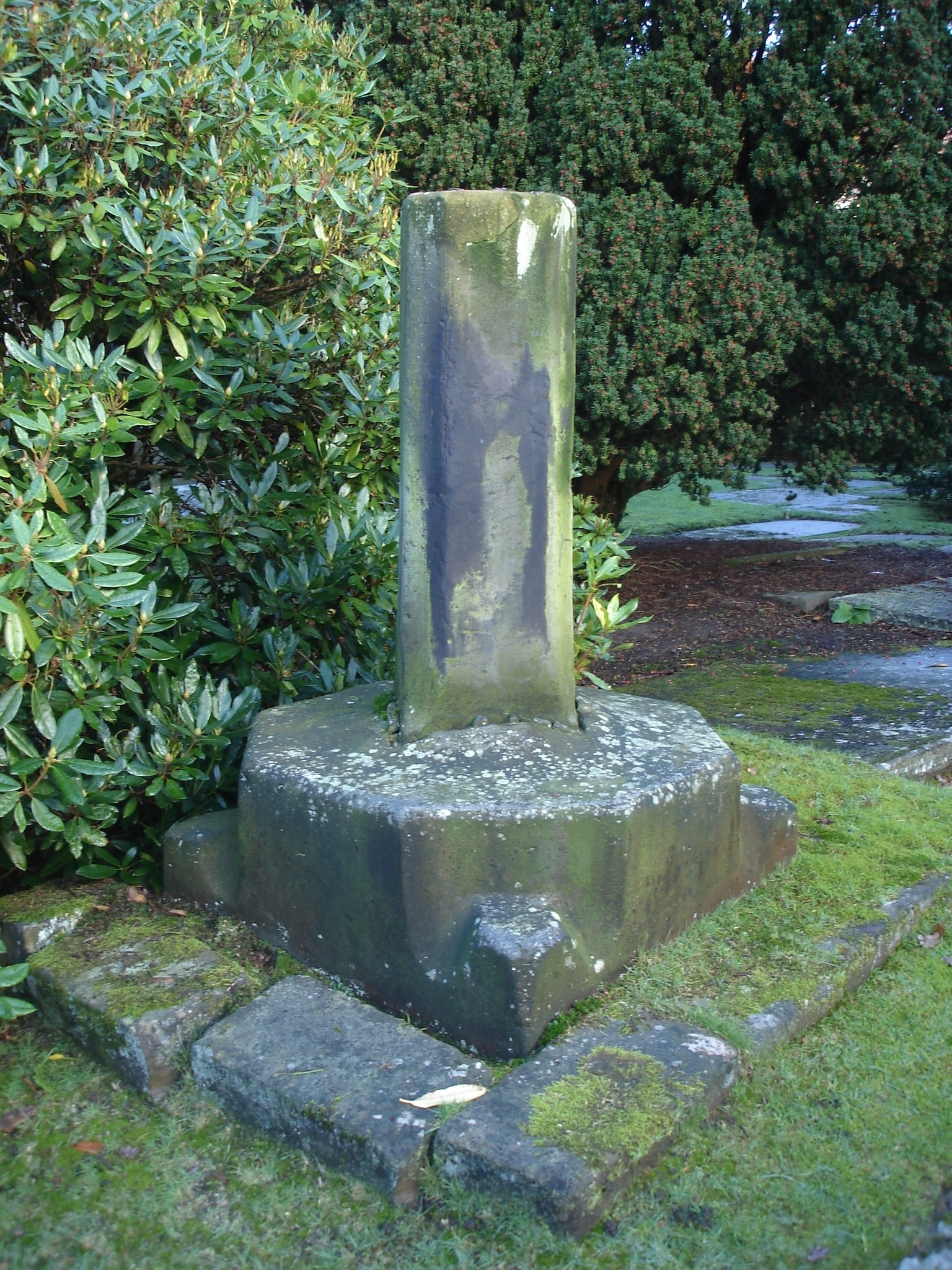
Medieval cross in the churchyard

The chancel contains memorials to the Lords Stanley of Alderley. The memorial to John Stanley, 1st Baron Stanley of Alderley contains his effigy dressed in peer's robes lying under a canopy with his hand on a book, dated 1856 and by Richard Westmacott. On the other side of the chancel is a memorial to his son Edward Stanley, his effigy holding a scroll in his hand and with a dog at his feet. Engraved in brass on the side of the memorial are the figures of his widow and children. Lady Stanley is seated in the middle with their four surviving sons on her right, five surviving daughters on her left and three children who had died at a young age at her knee and on her lap. A memorial tablet to John Constantine Stanley, who died in 1878, is by Joseph Boehm. The chancel contains a monument to Rev. Edward Shipton, rector of the church from 1625 to 1630.

The stained glass in the east window, dated 1856, was made by William Wailes. The glass in a south window in the chancel of 1909 was made by Morris & Co. The east window in the north aisle, dated 1920 is by Irene Dunlop. The stained glass window to the left of the pulpit was donated by the Greg family of Styal Mill. The stained glass in the window at the west end of the north aisle is to the memory of the wife of Edward John Bell, rector from 1870 to 1907, and was made by Clayton and Bell in 1877. The tower holds a ring of six bells, hung for change ringing, five of which were cast in 1787 by Rudhall of Gloucester, and the sixth by Charles and George Mears at the Whitechapel Bell Foundry in 1847. A seventh, unused, bell dates from 1686 and has been noted as being of historical importance by the Church Buildings Council of the Church of England. The parish registers begin in 1629, and the churchwardens' accounts in 1612.

== External features ==
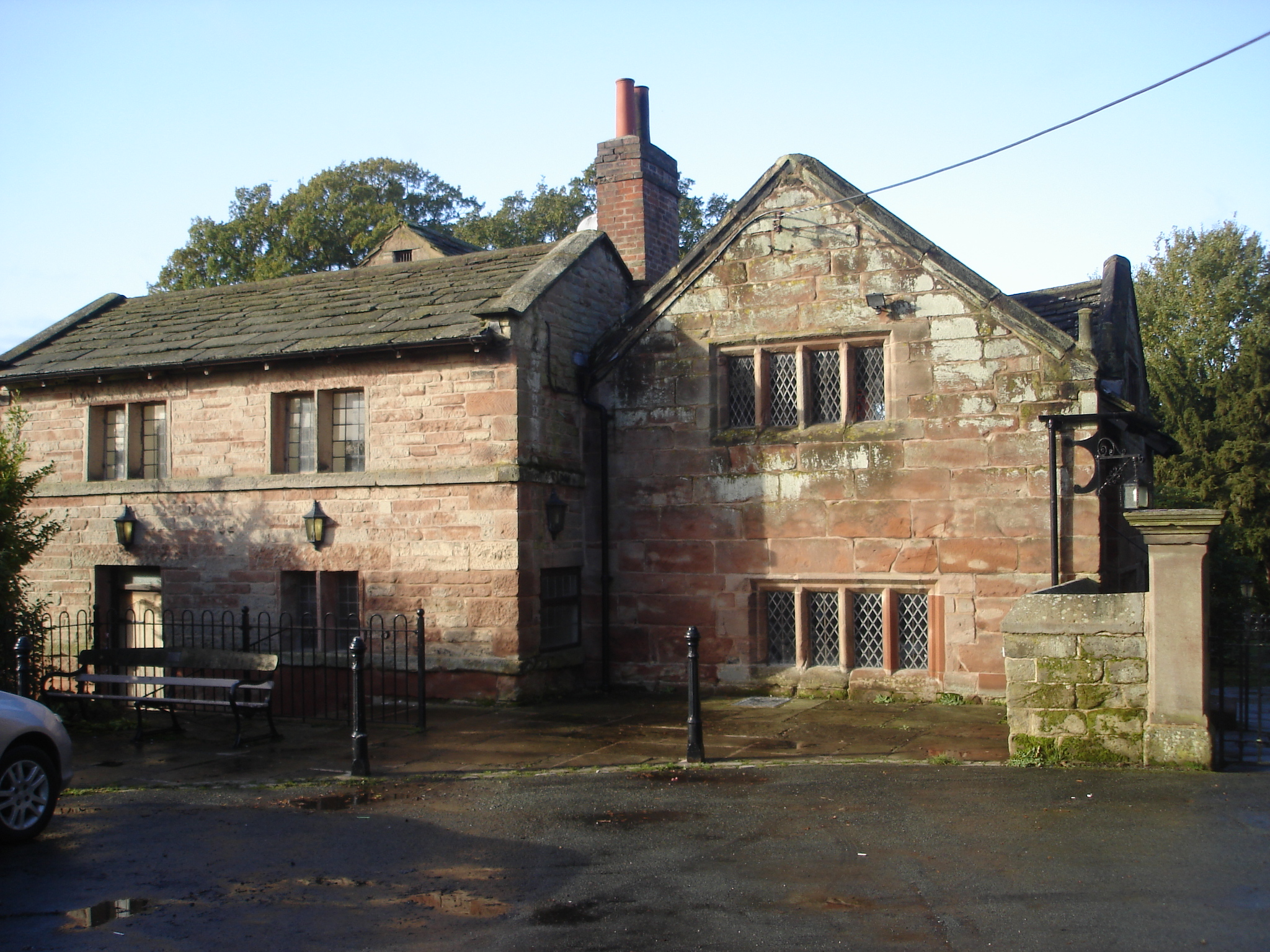
Old Schoolhouse

The Stanley Mausoleum

The sandstone schoolhouse in the churchyard was built in 1628; the school room was on the ground floor and the schoolmaster's accommodation was above. A large room was added to the rear in 1817, and in 1908 the building was restored and presented to the parish by Lord Stanley. It is now used as a parish hall and is listed Grade II*.

The medieval church cross in the churchyard, the Stanley Mausoleum, and the churchyard walls, gate piers and gates, are Grade II listed.

The mausoleum was built in 1909 by Edward Lyulph, 4th Lord Stanley. He died in 1925 and it contains his ashes and those of his wife, Mary Katherine, who died in 1929. The mausoleum is built in ashlar buff and red sandstone with a Kerridge stone-slate roof. It was designed in the neo-Jacobean style by Paul Phipps, and is rectangular in shape, with two storeys and a three-bay north front. The central bay contains a door, above which is the Stanley crest, a three-light window and a date plaque in the gable. On the sides of the upper storey are three four-light windows. Inside the mausoleum is a white marble sarcophagus. The yew tree in the churchyard is 1,200 years old.

== Rediscovery of the crypt ==
It had been known that under the church was a vault containing the remains of some members of the Stanley family but its whereabouts were not known until they were discovered by an architect in 2007. A stone slab was removed exposing steps leading to a crypt under the chancel. This contained six coffins, four of which contained the bodies of the first and second Lords Stanley and their wives. Once the details had been recorded, the crypt was resealed.

== Present activities ==
St Mary's holds a variety of Anglican services on Sundays and offers a range of church activities. The church is open to visitors at advertised times and guided tours are available. A parish magazine is published monthly.

== See also ==
- Grade I listed buildings in Cheshire East
- Grade I listed churches in Cheshire
- Listed buildings in Nether Alderley
- List of ecclesiastical works by Paley and Austin
