= Listed buildings in Nether Alderley =

Nether Alderley is a civil parish in Cheshire East, England. It contains 56 buildings that are recorded in the National Heritage List for England as designated listed buildings. Of these, one is listed at Grade I, the highest grade, four are listed at Grade II*, the middle grade, and the others are at Grade II. The parish contains the village of Nether Alderley. The largest house in the parish was the Old Hall which was damaged by fire in 1779. This was replaced on a different site by Park House in Alderley Park. This was in turn damaged by fire in 1931, and was demolished in 1933. Much of the park has since been used by a major pharmaceutical company.

The listed buildings in the parish include St Mary's Church and associated structures, buildings associated with the Old Hall and with Park House, houses, farmhouses, farm buildings, ancient crosses, a former water mill, and a milepost.

== Key ==
| Grade | Criteria |
|---|---|
| I | Buildings of exceptional interest, sometimes considered to be internationally important |
| II* | Particularly important buildings of more than special interest |
| II | Buildings of national importance and special interest |

== Buildings ==
| Name and location | Photograph | Date | Notes | Grade |
|---|---|---|---|---|
| St Mary's Church; 53.28198°N 2.23886°W | | c. 1300 | The tower was added in 1530, and the Stanley pew in about 1600. In 1856 the chancel was rebuilt, and the church was restored in 1868 by Paley and Austin. The church is built in sandstone with Kerridge stone-slate roofs, and consists of a nave, aisles, a chancel, a west tower and a south porch. On the nave roof is a bellcote. The Stanley pew can be entered only from outside the church. | I |
| Churchyard wall, gate and gate piers, St Mary's Church; 53.28198°N 2.23886°W | | Medieval | The walls are in sandstone with triangular coping, and completely encircle the churchyard. They date from the medieval era and were extended in 1908. The gate piers are also in sandstone; they are square and have moulded capstones. The gates are in wrought iron and date from the 20th century. | II |
| Churchyard cross 53.28189°N 2.23881°W | | Medieval | The churchyard cross is in sandstone, and has a square base rising to octagonal. Standing on it is a chamfered rectangular shaft. On top of this is a setting for a sundial, but no sundial is present. The letter "B" is carved on the east face. The cross is also a scheduled monument. | II |
| Village cross 53.28907°N 2.23619°W | | Medieval | The cross is in sandstone, and consists of a large square base supporting three square steps. This holds a cube-shaped block with the broken end of a shaft. The cross is also a scheduled monument. | II |
| Barn, Fernhill Farm; 53.26755°N 2.22379°W | — | 16th century | Additions were made to the barn in the 17th century, and there have been later changes. It is timber-framed with brick infill and brick end walls. The barn has a Kerridge stone-slate roof, and a front of three bays. The openings include a 19th-century loading bay. | II |
| Nut Tree; 53.28973°N 2.23777°W | | 16th century | The house was altered in the 17th century and extended in the 20th century. It is timber-framed on a sandstone plinth. The original part contains two five-light mullioned windows containing casements, the window in the upper storey in a half-dormer with a decorated gable. The later part of the house on the left has 20th-century windows and a plaque in the gable. | II |
| Nether Alderley Mill; 53.28288°N 2.23635°W | | Late 16th century | The water mill is built in sandstone. It has a long Kerridge stone-slate cat-slide roof containing four dormers. The mill has a rectangular plan, with the rear wall forming the dam for the lake supplying the water. The mill machinery dates from 1850 and 1871, and includes two overshot water wheels. The mill is managed by the National Trust. | II* |
| Old Hall; 53.28350°N 2.23602°W | | Late 16th century | The original manor house was destroyed by a fire in 1779, other than part of the service wing. It was rebuilt following this, and altered in 1912. The house is built in brick with sandstone dressings, and has a Kerridge stone-slate roof. It has a rectangular plan, is in two and three storeys, and has a three-bay south front. The central bay is in three storeys, it contains mullioned windows, and is gabled with a ball finial. | II* |
| Former stables, Old Hall; 53.28386°N 2.23614°W | — | Late 16th century | The stables were largely rebuilt in the 18th century, and altered in the 20th century. They are built in brick, partly on a stone plinth, and have a Kerridge stone-slate roof. The former stables have a rectangular plan, with a six-bay front. There are six large openings in the lower part, and three square pitch holes above. The left gable is timber-framed. | II |
| Soss Moss Hall; 53.27970°N 2.25925°W | — | 1583 | Originating as a manor house, it was extended in the early 17th century. It is timber-framed with infill partly in brick and partly in plaster, it stands on a sandstone plinth, and has a Kerridge stone-slate roof. On the left side is a massive stone chimney breast that incorporates garderobes. The house has an H-shaped plan, it is in two storeys, and its north front contains three gables. Between 1835 and 1940 the kitchen acted as a Methodist chapel. | II* |
| Apple House; 53.28397°N 2.23680°W | — | Early 17th century | This was originally a summer house in the corner of a walled garden, and has been converted into a house. It is built in brick on a stone plinth with sandstone dressings, and has a pyramidal roof in Kerridge stone-slate with a ball finial. The original building has a square plan and is in two storeys, and there are 20th-century single-storey extensions on three sides. Inside there is a cellar that contains a well. | II |
| Barn, Bagbrook Farm; 53.26528°N 2.25214°W | — | Early 17th century | The barn was extended in the 18th century. It is partly timber-framed with brick nogging, and partly in brick. It is roofed at the front in Welsh slate, and at the back in Kerridge stone-slate. | II |
| Fernhill Farmhouse; 53.26710°N 2.22384°W | — | Early 17th century | The farmhouse was largely rebuilt at a later date. It is in brick, and has a roof partly of Kerridge stone-slates, and partly of Welsh slates. It has an L-shaped plan, is in two storeys, and has a three-bay north front. The windows are casements. | II |
| Church Hall; 53.28177°N 2.23877°W | | 1628 | This originated as a school and master's house. It was extended at the rear in 1817, and later used as a church hall. The building is in sandstone, and has a Kerridge stone-slate roof. It was originally rectangular, and now has an L-shaped plan, it is in 1½ storeys, and has a north front of three bays. Both of the outer bays contains a doorway, and the middle bay contains two mullioned windows, the upper being in a gabled half-dormer. There are similar windows elsewhere, and also two datestones. | II* |
| Garden walls, Alderley Mill Cottage; 53.28458°N 2.23701°W | — | Early to mid-17th century | The walls originally surrounded a walled garden for the Old Hall. They forms a trapezium, and are built in brick with stone coping and quoins. The wall is about 2.5 metres (8.2 ft) high with buttresses on both sides. | II |
| Anne's Cottage; 53.28824°N 2.23274°W | | 17th century | The cottage was rebuilt in the early 19th century and altered in the following century. It is built in brick. The roof is partly thatched, and partly roofed on Kerridge stone-slate. The windows in the lower storey date from the 20th century, and above are earlier casements. There is evidence of a timber-framed origin. | II |
| Cross Farmhouse; 53.28910°N 2.23651°W | | 17th century | Originally a farmhouse, it has been divided into two cottages. The building is in two storeys and has a four-bay front. The left two bays are the older part, initially timber-framed, and recased in brick in the early 19th century. There is a gable in the right hand bay. The two brick right bays were added in 1735. The roof is in Kerridge stone-slate, and the windows are casements. | II |
| Eagle and Child Cottage; 53.28202°N 2.23622°W | | 17th century | This originated as a farmhouse, it was later used as an inn, and has since been converted into a house. It has an L-shaped plan, and is in two storeys with cellars. The north range is timber-framed with brick nogging and a Kerridge stone-slate roof, and has a two-bay north front. The left bay contains a door, above which is a gable containing a five-light mullioned window; the right bay projects forward and is also gabled and contains mullioned windows. The west range is in brick, and there is a timber-framed outshut at the rear. | II |
| Fallows Hall; 53.26425°N 2.25135°W | — | 17th century | A house with possibly a timber-framed core, that was extended in the 18th century and altered in the 19th and 20th centuries. It is built in brick with a Kerridge stone-slate roof. The house has an L-shaped plan, is in two storeys, and has a four-bay front, the two right bays projecting forward under a gable. The windows are casements, and there is one blocked mullioned window. Inside the house is an inglenook. | II |
| Flume Head; 53.28811°N 2.23135°W | — | 17th century | The cottage was considerably extended in the 20th century. The original building is in sandstone and the later parts are in brick, with a roof of Kerridge stone-slate. The early part has a gable on the road front containing three-light mullioned windows. | II |
| Garden wall and corner pier, Old Hall; 53.28314°N 2.23652°W | — | 17th century | The older part of the wall is in sandstone, and the later part, built in the 18th century, is in brick with stone coping. The corner pier is rusticated, standing on a moulded plinth, with a moulded capstone and a stepped top. | II |
| Gate piers, walls and bridge, Old Hall; 53.28349°N 2.23628°W | — | 17th century | The structures are in sandstone. The gate piers contain 20th-century wrought iron gates, and lead to a bridge over the moat. The bridge consists of a segmental arch, and has low parapets and a flagged walkway. Flanking the piers are wing walls, and the parapet becomes the wall to the moat and continues to join the house. | II |
| Heawood Hall, Heawood House and Heawood Chase; 53.27743°N 2.24602°W | | 17th century | A house altered in the 18th and 20th centuries and converted into three houses. It is built in brick with sandstone dressings, and has a hipped roof in Welsh slate. The main house is in three storeys, and has a five-bay front. The windows are sashes, some in mullioned surrounds. One of the new houses has been converted from a two-storey rear range that has a front of six bays. | II |
| Monksheath Hall; 53.26256°N 2.23067°W | — | 17th century | There was a major rebuild of this farmhouse in the 19th century. It is built in brick on a sandstone plinth and has sandstone quoins and a Kerridge stone-slate roof. The house is in two storeys, and has three gables on the front. The windows are casements, and there is a blocked mullioned window. | II |
| White Gate Cottage; 53.28824°N 2.23310°W | | 17th century | The house was extended and the roof raised in the 19th century. The original part is timber-framed with brick nogging and a Kerridge stone-slate roof. The extension to the right is in brick, and all the openings date from the 20th century. | II |
| Wyche's Farmhouse; 53.28202°N 2.27055°W | — | 17th century | The original part of the farmhouse is timber-framed with plaster infill on a stone plinth, and a brick extension was added in the 20th century. The roof is tiled. The house has a T-shaped plan, is in two storeys, and has a three-bay front. The left bay is the gable end of the original building. There is a doorway in the middle bay with a timber-framed half-dormer above. | II |
| Gate piers, Alderley Mill Cottage; 53.28406°N 2.23642°W | — | Late 17th century | The gate piers are in sandstone with a rusticated body. On this is a projecting moulded capstone with a ball finial on a curved stand. | II |
| Yew Tree Farmhouse; 53.29037°N 2.23943°W | | Late 17th century | The former farmhouse was altered in the 19th century. It is built in rendered brick on a sandstone plinth, and has a Kerridge stone-slate roof. The house is in two storeys, and has a three-bay front. The windows are casements, the central window in the upper floor being in a timber-framed half-dormer in a gable. Inside the house are timber-framed partition walls and an inglenook. | II |
| Yew Tree Cottage; 53.28844°N 2.23413°W | — | 1687 | Originally a farmhouse, later a cottage, it is timber-framed with brick nogging on a stone plinth, and has a green slate roof. The cottage is in 1½ storeys, and has a three-bay front. The windows are mullioned, one in the upper floor being in a gabled half-dormer with a bargeboard. | II |
| Barn, Heawood Hall Farm; 53.27731°N 2.24663°W | — | Early 18th century | A brick barn with sandstone dressings and a Kerridge stone-slate roof. It is in two storeys, and has a five-bay front. The openings include a central cart entrance (now reduced), elliptical pitch holes, and ventilation slots. | II |
| Walton Farmhouse; 53.28921°N 2.24817°W | | 1745 | The farmhouse was altered in the 20th century. It is in brick with a Welsh slate roof, it has 2½ storeys and a symmetrical three-bay front. The windows are mullioned and transomed containing casements. In the central bay is a gabled porch, above which is a triangular pediment with a bargeboard. | II |
| Stanley obelisk 53.28358°N 2.23235°W | | 1750 | The obelisk is in sandstone. It has a square base on an inscribed moulded plinth. Standing on it is a tall tapering octagonal pillar with a pointed top. On the top is a ball carrying the Stanley family's spread eagle. | II |
| Dean Green Farmhouse; 53.28495°N 2.25502°W | — | Mid-18th century | The farmhouse is in brick with Welsh slate roofs. It has 2½ storeys, and a symmetrical three-bay front. The windows are casements, the window above the doorway being in a gabled half-dormer. At the rear are two single-storey extensions. | II |
| Gatley Green Farmhouse; 53.28452°N 2.24775°W | — | Mid-18th century | The farmhouse is in brick with Welsh slate roofs. It has 2½ storeys, and a symmetrical three-bay front. The windows are casements, the window above the doorway being in a gabled half-dormer. There are 20th-century extension at the side and rear. | II |
| Millbrook and Church Cottages; 53.28225°N 2.23636°W | | Mid-18th century | A house and two cottages forming an L-shaped plan; they are in brick with Kerridge stone-slate roofs. The house faces the main road, is in three storeys and has a four-bay front. In the centre is a small gabled dormer containing a circular window. All the other windows are casements. The cottages face the side road, are in two storeys, and have a front of five bays. | II |
| Former Stables, Eagle and Child Cottage; 53.28181°N 2.23619°W | — | Late 18th century | Additions and alterations were made to the stables in the 19th and 20th centuries. They are built in brick with a Kerridge stone-slate roof. The building is in an L-shaped plan, it has two stories, and a north front of three bays. It contains doors, a mullioned window, pitch holes, and ventilation holes. | II |
| Rectory; 53.28217°N 2.23827°W | | Late 18th century | The front of the rectory was added in about 1825. The building is in brick on a stone plinth with stone dressings, and it has a Welsh slate roof. It is in Tudor Gothic style, with two storeys, and a four-bay front. The left bay projects forward under a gable, and contains a canted bay window. The windows at the front of the rectory are mullioned or mullioned and transomed, and those at the rear are sashes. | II |
| Bradford Lodge and cottage 53.28972°N 2.21450°W | | 1812 | The building is in sandstone with a Welsh slate roof. It is in two storeys and has a five-bay front. On the front the windows are mullioned with casements, and in the left gable there are sashes. There are two gabled porches on the front, and a lean-to on the right. | II |
| Training Centre and Stores, Alderley Park; 53.27150°N 2.23397°W | | 1815 | This originated as stables and outbuildings, and was extended in 1838. It is built in brick on a stone plinth with sandstone dressings, and has a hipped Welsh slate roof. It is in two ranges, forming two sides of a courtyard. The building is in two storeys, the west range having 12 bays, and with a pediment containing an inscribed plaque. | II |
| Beechtree Lodge; 53.28202°N 2.22491°W | | 1815 | Originally two gamekeepers' cottages, this was later converted into a house. It is built in sandstone and has a Welsh slate roof. The house has a rectangular plan, is in two storeys, and has a symmetrical three-bay front. The windows are mullioned with casements. There is a central gabled porch. | II |
| Outbuilding, Beechtree Lodge; 53.28226°N 2.22484°W | | c. 1815 | This originated as a pigcote, shippon and earth closet, and has been converted into a study and for storage. It is built in sandstone and has a roof of Kerridge stone-slate. The building has a five-bay front; two of the central bays are in two storeys, and the others are in a single storey. There is a three-light mullioned window and a circular pitch hole, now glazed. | II |
| Church Lodge; 53.27970°N 2.23663°W | | 1817 | A former lodge to Alderley Park, it is built in brick on a sandstone plinth with sandstone dressings, and has three pagoda-type roofs. It is in Tudor Gothick style with a four-bay front. From the left, the bays are in two, one, two, and three storeys, the last with a weathervane in the form of a grasshopper. | II |
| Gates, gate piers and walls, Matthew's Nursery; 53.26745°N 2.23528°W | — | c. 1820 | These were originally at the entrance to Alderley Park. The walls and gate piers are in sandstone, the piers being rusticated with projecting moulded capstones. On the central pair is a crest, and on the tops are carved spread eagles. Between the central pair are wrought iron gates, between the next pair are railings with spears, and outside these are curving wing walls. | II |
| Rectory Cottage; 53.28223°N 2.23776°W | | c. 1825 | Originating as stables and a coach house, this has been partly converted into a cottage. It is built in brick with a Kerridge stone-slate roof. The building is in two storeys, and has a six-bay front, the right two bays forming the cottage. The windows are casements, and other openings include pitch holes, inserted garage doors, and a former carriage entrance. | II |
| Dovecote, Alderley Park; 53.27101°N 2.23352°W | | Early 19th century | The former dovecote is in brick on a stone plinth with sandstone dressings, and has a pyramidal Kerridge stone-slate roof. It is a tall hexagonal building with a modillion cornice, and is surmounted by a wooden bellcote with a weathervane. On each face is a circular opening, and inside are over 400 brick ledges. | II |
| Entrance Arch, Walled Garden, Alderley Park; 53.27069°N 2.23283°W | | Early to mid-19th century | The arch is partly in sandstone, and partly in brick, with a Welsh slate roof. It is in a square plan, and has a Doric porch with four columns and a triangular pediment. The porch contains a barrel vaulted passage leading to a semicircular entrance to the former house. | II |
| Gate piers and gates, Garden, Alderley Park; 53.27026°N 2.23283°W | | Early to mid-19th century | The outer gate piers are in rusticated sandstone, and between them are similar piers with spread eagles on the capstones. | II |
| Icehouse, Alderley Park; 53.27010°N 2.23466°W | | Early to mid-19th century | The icehouse is built in brick. It has a semicircular entrance with stone coping that leads to a barrel vaulted passage, and a circular domed chamber. | II |
| Milepost; 53.26411°N 2.22935°W | | Early to mid-19th century | The milepost is in cast iron and consists of a low bollard carrying a curved plate with three panels. In the top panel is inscribed "ALDERLEY", and the lower panels contain the distances in miles to Macclesfield and to Knutsford. | II |
| Gate piers and gates, Tenant's Hall, Alderley Park; 53.27156°N 2.23326°W | | c. 1840 | The gate piers are in slightly rusticated sandstone, standing on moulded plinths, and have capstones with ball finials. The gates are in wrought iron. | II |
| Kennel house and compound 53.28246°N 2.22424°W | | 1867 | The kennel house is in brick with sandstone dressings and a tiled roof. Its south front has a stepped gable with a weathervane. Also on this front is a mullioned window, a datestone, a coat of arms, and a pitch hole. The kennel yard is square, and is surrounded by a brick wall with stone coping. | II |
| Fernhill Lodge; 53.26323°N 2.22447°W | — | c. 1870 | The lodge is in brick with sandstone dressings and a tiled roof. It is in a single storey with an attic, and has a three-bay east front. The gables are shaped with finials, and the south front contains a canted bay window. The windows are mullioned, and there is a gabled timber porch with pierced bargeboards. | II |
| Brookdene and attached cottage 53.29031°N 2.2386°W | — | 1872 | A pair of cottages with sandstone dressings and a tiled roof. They are in two storeys and have a symmetrical four-bay front. The outer bays contain doorways, and each of the central bays has a four-light mullioned window in the ground floor, and a casement window above in a timber-framed gabled dormer. | II |
| Tenant's Hall, Alderley Park; 53.27153°N 2.23300°W | | 1904 | A meeting hall designed by Paul Phipps, in brick with sandstone dressings, and with a green slate roof. It is in a single storey, and has a seven-bay front. On the front is a Doric portico, and the windows are mullioned and transomed. | II |
| Stanley Mausoleum; 53.28166°N 2.23918°W | | 1909 | The mausoleum was designed by Paul Phipps. It is in sandstone with a Kerridge stone-slate roof, and is in Neo-Jacobean style. The building has a rectangular plan, and a north front of three bays. Above the central doorway is a coat of arms and an acanthus band. Above this is a three-light mullioned window and another acanthus band. Inside the mausoleum is a white marble sarcophagus. | II |
| Sandhurst and Hill Cottage; 53.29448°N 2.23493°W | — | 1910 | A pair of semi-detached houses designed by A. E. Beresford in Arts and Crafts style. They are built in rendered brick and have tiled roofs. They are in 1½ storeys with basements, and have an asymmetrical front. The windows are mullioned and contain casements. | II |

== See also ==
- Listed buildings in Alderley Edge
- Listed buildings in Over Alderley
- Listed buildings in Henbury
- Listed buildings in Siddington
- Listed buildings in Chelford
- Listed buildings in Marthall
- Listed buildings in Little Warford
- Listed buildings in Great Warford
- Listed buildings in Chorley
