= Katharine Russell, Viscountess Amberley =

British suffragist and birth control advocate (1842–1874)

Viscountess Amberley
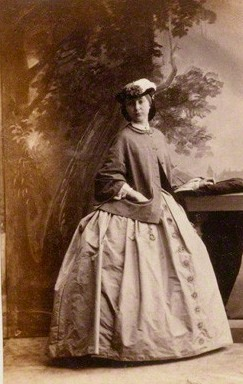
- Amberley in 1860
- Born: Katharine Louisa Stanley; 3 March 1842; Belgravia, London, England
- Died: 28 June 1874 (aged 32)
- Spouse: John Russell, Viscount Amberley (m. 1864)
- Children: 4, including Frank and Bertrand
- Parents: Edward Stanley, 2nd Baron Stanley of Alderley (father); Henrietta Dillon-Lee (mother)

Katharine Louisa Russell, Viscountess Amberley (née Stanley; 3 April 1842 – 28 June 1874), was a British suffragist and an early advocate of birth control in the United Kingdom. A member of the Stanley and Russell families, she was the mother of the philosopher Bertrand Russell.

== Early life ==
Viscountess Amberley was born in Grosvenor Crescent, the eighth child of the politician Edward Stanley, 2nd Baron Stanley of Alderley, and the women's education campaigner Henrietta Stanley, Baroness Stanley of Alderley.

Her nine siblings included Rosalind Howard, Countess of Carlisle, another suffragist, and Maude Stanley, a youth work pioneer.

== Marriage ==
On 8 November 1864, she married John Russell, Viscount Amberley, the son of the former prime minister John Russell, 1st Earl Russell, and his wife Frances. Their first child, John Francis Stanley, was born the next year and followed by twins, Rachel Lucretia and her stillborn sister, in 1868. The couple's last child, Bertrand Arthur William, was born in 1872.

Lady Amberley had a sexual relationship with the biologist Douglas Spalding, her children's tutor, with her husband's consent. Spalding was encouraged to do research in the Amberleys' home, Cleddon Hall, Monmouthshire, with Lady Amberley as his assistant. He suffered from tuberculosis and was not fit for marriage. According to their younger son, the Amberleys were concerned for his celibacy and "allowed him to live with her", though Bertrand Russell wrote that he knew of "no evidence that she derived any pleasure from doing so". The exact nature of Lady Amberley's relationship with Spalding afterwards is unknown, as her mother-in-law found out about it and destroyed their journals and most of their correspondence shortly after Lord Amberley's death.

== Views ==
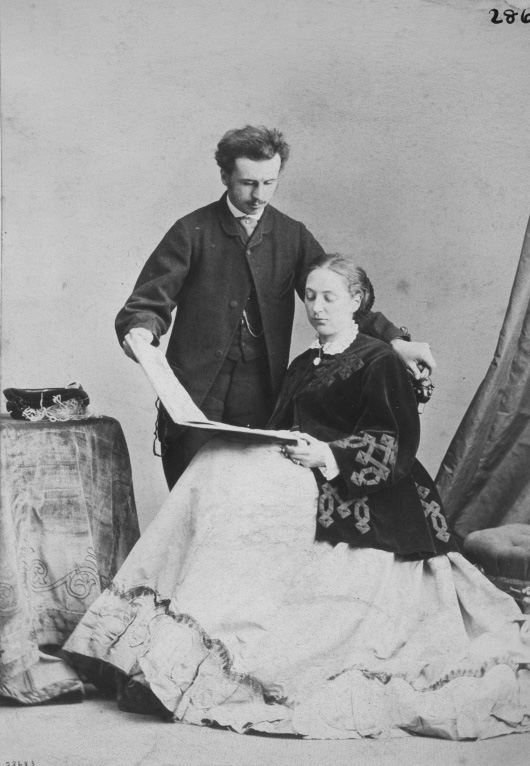
Albumen print of Lord and Lady Amberley made by William Notman in Montreal in 1867 and currently owned by McCord Museum

Lady Amberley was a suffragist and an early proponent of women's rights. She encouraged women to study medicine, providing a scholarship for the medicine student Emily Bovell and employing Elizabeth Garrett Anderson as her personal physician. Harriet Grote introduced her to Helen Taylor in 1865 and the next year, she signed the women's suffrage petition. In 1867, Lord and Lady Amberley travelled to North America, visiting Canada and the United States of America. They stayed in the United States for several months and met Lucretia Mott, after whom she named her daughter. She became president of the Bristol and West of England Women's Suffrage Society in 1870 and campaigned for equal pay for women and their education and acceptance into all professions.

Following a suffrage meeting held in Hanover Square Rooms in 1870, the Countess Russell told her son that she appreciated the fact that his wife had not taken part in it. The relief was unwarranted; Viscountess Amberley spoke out at the Mechanics Institute at Stroud on 25 May, prompting Queen Victoria to exclaim that "Lady Amberley ought to get a good whipping".

== Death ==
In 1874, Viscountess Amberley died of diphtheria caught from her daughter, who died five days later. Their deaths greatly affected Lord Amberley, whose decision to have their bodies cremated without religious ceremony shocked English society. Lady Amberley's ashes were originally deposited in the grounds of their Wye Valley home along with those of her daughter. Shortly after her husband's death two years later, all three sets of remains were moved to the Russell family vault at St Michael's, Chenies.
