= Nether Alderley Mill =

Historic watermill in Cheshire, England

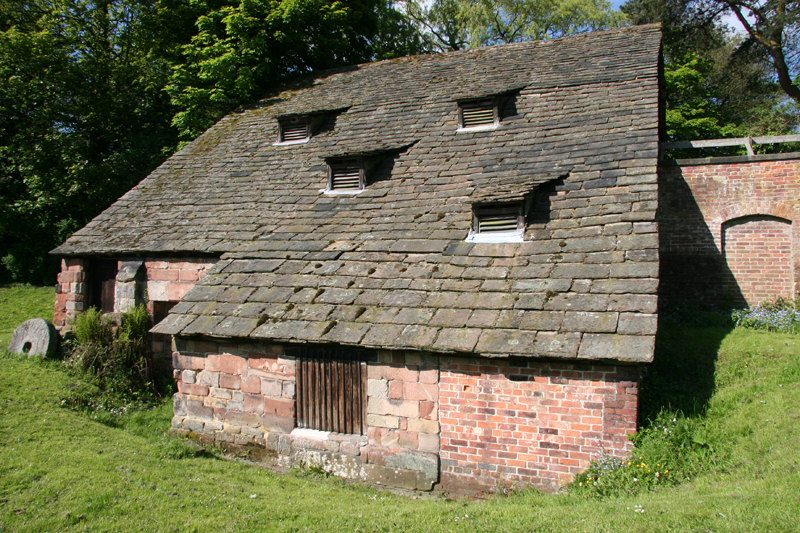
- Nether Alderley Mill

- Location in Cheshire
- 53.28290°N 2.23632°W
- Location: Nether Alderley, Cheshire, England
- OS grid reference: SJ 843 763

History
- Built: 16th century

Site notes
- Restored: 1967–70
- Restored by: National Trust

Listed Building – Grade II*
- Designated: 25 May 1952
- Reference no.: 1139592

Nether Alderley Mill is a 16th-century watermill located in Congleton Road (the A34), to the south of the village of Nether Alderley, Cheshire, England. It is owned by the National Trust, and is recorded in the National Heritage List for England as a designated Grade II* listed building. It is a unique example of a triple overshot waterwheel system, two of which are in working order. It is one of only four virtually complete corn mills in Cheshire.

== History ==
The earliest reference to the mill is in 1391. The 14th-century mill was replaced in 1595–1597, at around the time that ownership of the manor mill passed to the Stanley family, and some of this late-16th century stonework survives in the mill's basement.

In the mid-18th century, the mill was enlarged to its current size and layout. To provide more power, a new mill pond was built, along with new tunnels, inside which the date 1746 is inscribed. The new construction appears to have reused much of the stonework and timbers from the 16th-century mill. Improvements to the mill continued during the 1800s, with a new upper waterwheel and cast iron mechanism added early in the century, followed by a new lower waterwheel and tailrace tunnels in the 1840s. Further mechanical improvements included a new cast-iron hurst frame and gearing to connect it to the upper waterwheel, installed in the 1870s.

From the 1880s to 1914 the mill could be operated by a portable 10 hp steam engine. The mill closed in about 1939, and the building became derelict. It came into the ownership of the National Trust in 1950. The Trust restored the mill into working order in 1967–70.

== Architecture and machinery ==
The mill is constructed in buff-pink ashlar sandstone, and has a long cat-slide roof of Kerridge stone-slate. Its plan is rectangular. The roof weighs about 200 tons, and is carried on an Elizabethan oak frame. The rear wall of the mill forms the dam for the lake supplying the water for the mill; this also acts as a moat for Alderley Old Hall. The water drives two overshot wheels of 12 feet (3.7 m) and 13 feet (4.0 m) diameter. Each operates separately, forming in effect two distinct mills with its own machinery, the water passing from the upper wheel to the lower one.

== See also ==
- Grade II* listed buildings in Cheshire East
- Listed buildings in Nether Alderley
