= Maria Stanley, Baroness Stanley of Alderley =

British letter writer and liberal advocate

The Right Honourable The Lady Stanley of Alderley
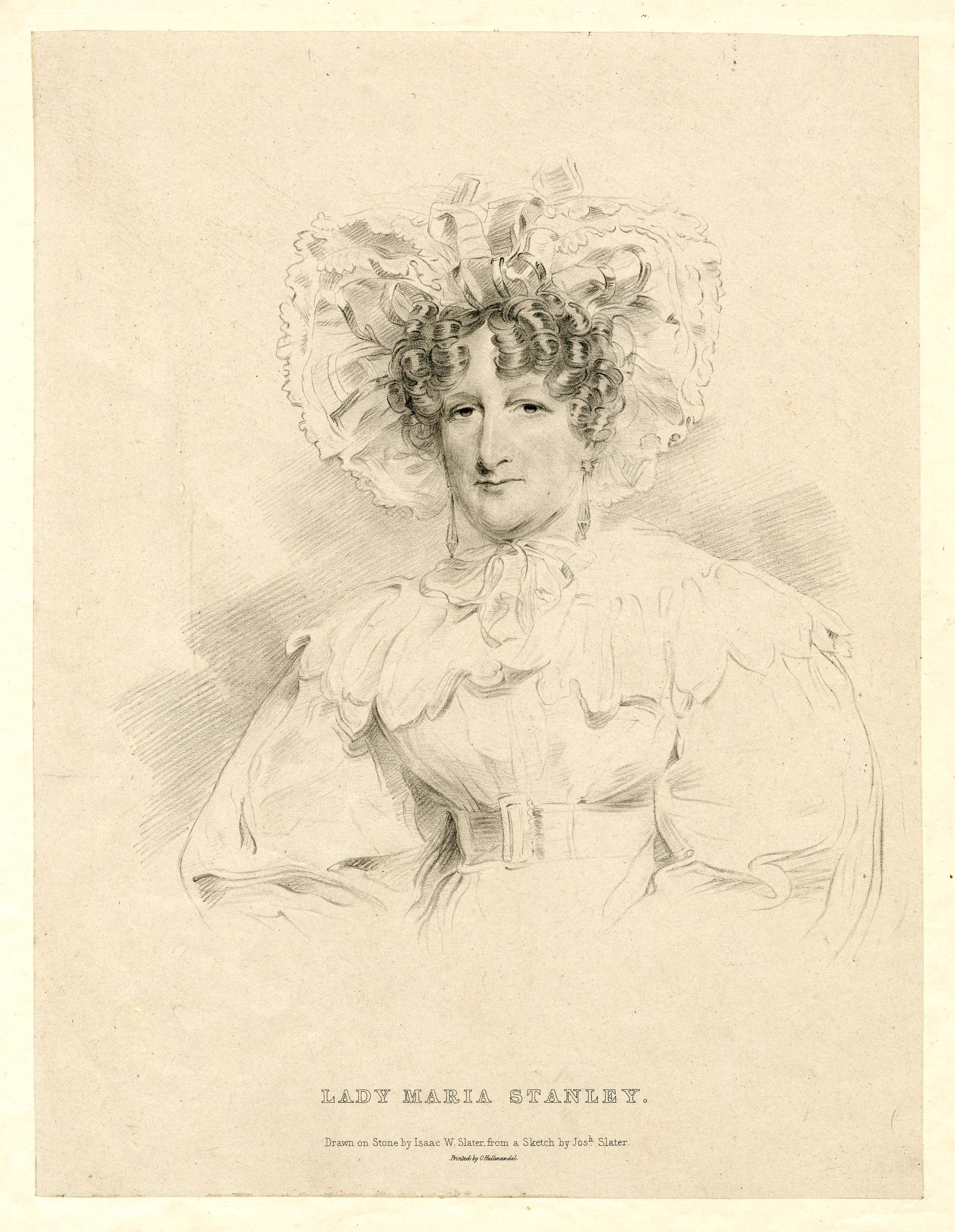
- Born: Maria Josepha Holroyd; 3 January 1771; Ferrybridge, Yorkshire
- Died: 1 November 1863 (aged 92); Shiplake, Oxfordshire, England
- Spouse: John Stanley, 7th Baronet and in time 1st Baron Stanley of Alderley
- Children: 11
- Parent(s): John Baker Holroyd, 1st Earl of Sheffield and Abigail Way

Maria Josepha Stanley, Baroness Stanley of Alderley (née Holroyd; 1771–1863) was a British letter writer and liberal advocate from the Stanley family.

== Life ==
Stanley was born in 1771 to Abigail (née Way) and John Baker Holroyd. Her mother was the daughter of Lewis Way, director of the South Sea Company, and sister of Benjamin Way.

They lived at an estate called Sheffield Park in Sussex that her father had bought after inheriting a fortune from his uncle. Her father, a politician, became Baron Sheffield in 1781 and the Earl of Sheffield in 1816, both in the Peerage of Great Britain. In 1783, following the death of his only son at aged 5, he was created Baron Sheffield, of Roscommon in the County of Roscommon, in the Irish peerage with a special remainder that it could be inherited by his daughters and then to their sons. Another son was born in 1802 who inherited his father's titles.

Maria was precocious and she and her sister, Louise, would write and perform plays. The theme of many of these plays was a question—whether a daughter would be allowed to choose her own husband or whether it would be imposed by her parents.

When she was twelve her intelligence attracted the interest of Edward Gibbon who was a close friend of her father. Gibbon proposed that he should teach her over the next four years.

== Marriage and family ==
Stanley chose her own husband. She sorted through many likely groups and she decided to choose a man as well educated as herself. She married Sir John Stanley, 7th Baronet, in 1796. Her husband was known as an Icelandic explorer.

They went to live at Alderley Park in Cheshire. The Stanley family had lived there for around two hundred years, but the hall had been damaged by fire in 1779. Sir John and Lady Maria had commissioned a new hall to be constructed in 1818 in the south of the estate on a site then occupied by Park House. They lived there for fifty years and there were 11 children of the marriage; twin sons and seven daughters survived to adulthood.

- Hon. Maria Margaret (20 July 1797 – 24 February 1882), died unmarried
- Hon. Louisa Dorothea (7 November 1799 – 3 June 1877), died unmarried
- Hon. Isabella Louisa (27 May 1801 – 13 May 1839) married in 1826 Sir William Edward Parry, and was mother of Edward Parry. Died two days following the birth of twin sons, who died.
- Hon. Lucy Anne (30 June 1798 – 15 March 1869), married in 1833 Marcus Theodore Hare.
- Hon. Edward John (1802–1869), elder twin who inherited the title
- Hon. William Owen (1802–1884), younger twin and politician
- Hon. Harriot Alethea (23 October 1804 – 24 April 1888), married in 1835 Gen. William Henry Scott
- Hon. Matilda Abigail (9 June 1806 – 28 July 1850), married Henry John Adeane.
- Alfred (15 February 1808 – 24 March 1811), died young
- Hon. Emmeline (28 September 1810 – 31 August 1906), married in 1844 Albert Way
- Elfrida Susannah (15 December 1813 – 17 September 1817), died young

== Death and legacy ==
Stanley died in Shiplake in 1863. In 1896, her early letters were published as Girlhood of Maria Josepha Holroyd (Lady Stanley of Alderley).
