= Alderley Park =

Former country estate in England

- Manchester Science Parks
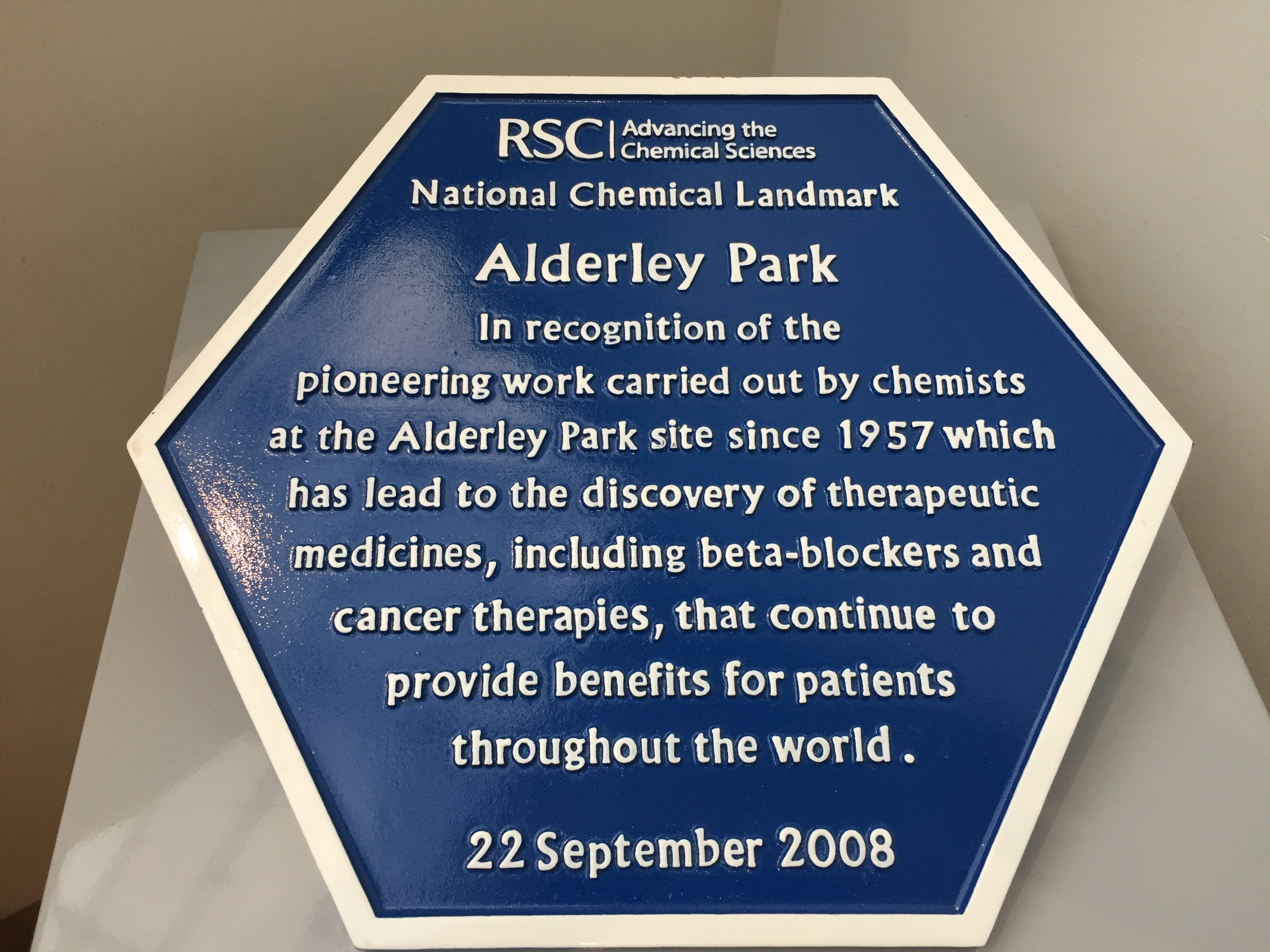
- National Chemical Landmark at Alderley Park

- Location within Cheshire
- Former names: ICI Pharmaceuticals Division, Zeneca Pharmaceuticals, AstraZeneca

General information
- Type: Science park, former ICI research centre
- Location: Nether Alderley, Cheshire, SK10 4TG
- Coordinates: 53.271°N 2.233°W
- Elevation: 95 m (312 ft)
- Completed: 1957
- Inaugurated: 1957
- Client: ICI Pharmaceuticals

Dimensions
- Other dimensions: 21.5 hectares

Alderley Park was a country estate at Nether Alderley, Cheshire, England, between Macclesfield and Knutsford. It was the residence of the Stanley family of Alderley from the 1500s. It became the headquarters of ICI Pharmaceuticals in the 1950s. It was purchased from AstraZeneca by Bruntwood in 2014. The site has an international reputation as a home for bio and life sciences.

The Alderley New Hall was constructed in brick with a stone facade for Baroness Maria and John, 7th Baronet (later 1st Baron) Stanley. Building started in 1818 on a site in the south of the park. In 1931, the house was severely damaged by fire and left empty for nearly twenty years until converted in 1950 by Imperial Chemical Industries (ICI) to serve as the base for their new pharmaceutical division. The gardens and some outbuildings have been preserved and many thousands of trees planted.

== History ==
The manor of Over Alderley came into the Stanley family when heiress Elizabeth Weever married John Stanley, a brother of the Earl of Derby. In the 1580s John Stanley's descendant, Thomas Stanley, built a mansion house on a moated site near the mill at Nether Alderley. Thomas died in 1591.

The adjacent manor of Nether Alderley had been confiscated by the crown in 1508 from the estate of Sir William Stanley after his conviction and execution for supporting Perkin Warbeck. It was sold in 1556 to Sir Edward Fitton of Gawsworth who sold it on for £2000 to Thomas Stanley, jnr in 1602. Thomas was knighted by King James in 1603. The Stanley family subsequently occupied the hall for around two hundred years until it was severely damaged by fire in 1779; part of the old hall survives, dating from the 17th century.

The correspondent Hon. Maria Josepha and the explorer John Stanley, 1st Baron Stanley of Alderley, married in 1796. They lived here for fifty years and there were 11 children of the marriage, with sons who were twins and seven daughters surviving to become adults. The 7th Baronet and Baroness had commissioned a new hall to be constructed in 1818, in the south of the estate on a site then occupied by Park House. The new house grew to a size of sixty bedrooms and six entertaining rooms, of which only one room, with its oak panelling and coats of arms intact, remains. Behind the house a walled garden and a water garden were created and the mill pond was enlarged.

The new hall was occupied by further generations of the Stanley family until 1931, when it too was damaged by fire during the occupation of The 6th Baron Stanley of Alderley, and had to be partially demolished and left unoccupied. The sixth Lord's finances had suffered from the effects of two expensive divorces, gambling losses and death duties, and in 1938 he decided to sell the estate piecemeal, involving the disposal of 77 farms and 166 houses. No offers were received for the hall itself and it stood empty for nearly twenty years.

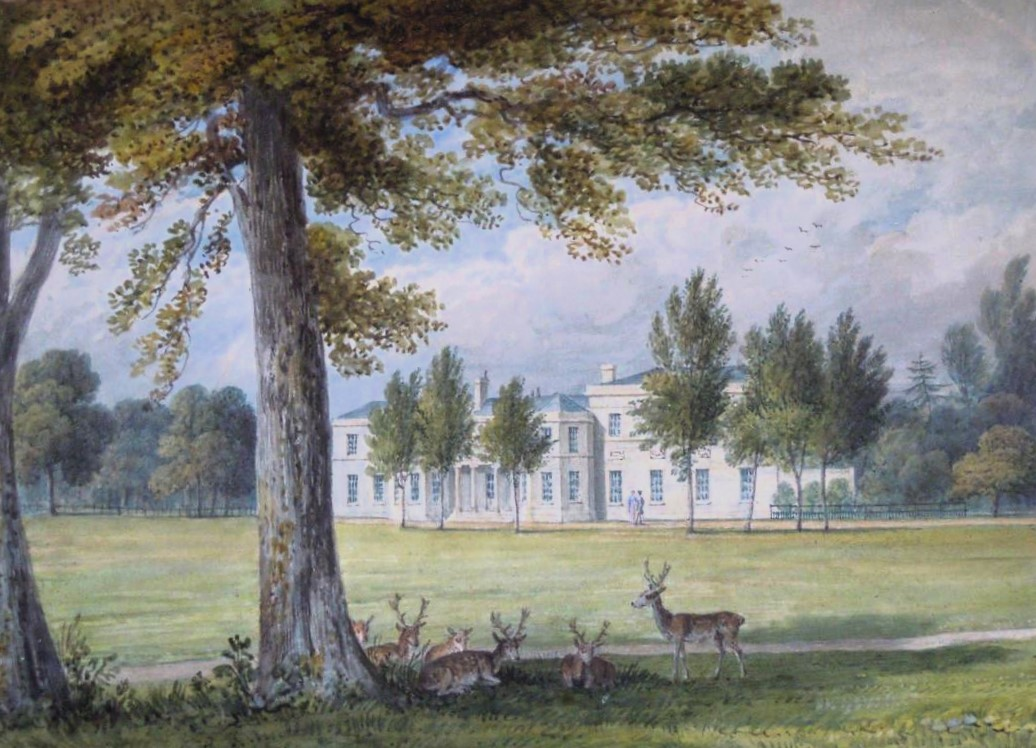
19th-century sketch of Alderley House (the new hall)

The 4th Baron Stanley of Alderley hosted Prime Minister H. H. Asquith and his cabinet minister, Winston Churchill, at Alderley Park in the early 1900s. Churchill planted a sweet chestnut tree near the Tenant's Hall, known since as the Churchill Tree.

== Structure ==
The site is north-east of the Monk's Heath Crossroads between the A537 and A34. Before the M6 opened in the early 1960s, the A34 was the main thoroughfare to the north-west. The ICI site was accessed to the west from the former A34; the A34 Alderley Edge Bypass opened on 19 November 2010.

== Business use ==
=== ICI ===
In 1950 the dilapidated hall and 350 acres (140 ha) of surrounding parkland were purchased, with planning permission to develop, by ICI Pharmaceuticals for £55,000. Work began in 1957 on a site by Radnor Mere (the enlarged mill pond) to provide office and laboratory facilities, initially for ICI and latterly for AstraZeneca (after ICI Pharmaceuticals became Zeneca Pharmaceuticals in 1993), and which came to house some 3,500 staff. It became a global lead centre for cancer research and a number of anti-cancer treatments were developed at the site including Nolvadex, Zoladex, Casodex, Arimidex and Iressa. The ground-breaking anaesthetic Diprivan was discovered in the laboratories in 1973.

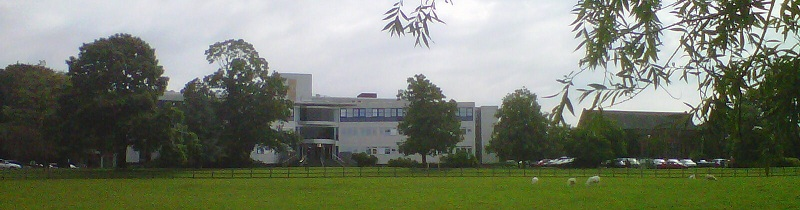
Alderley House and Sir James Black Conference Centre in 2012

In 1963 a new Alderley House was built as the commercial headquarters (it was demolished in 2015). The original Tenants' Hall was used a hospital in the Great War and was once named the Sir James Black Conference Centre in honour of the Nobel Prize-winning discoverer of beta-blockers; as of 2022 it houses a pub called the Churchill Tree. The gardens and the woodlands have been restored and the nearby Grade II listed Home Farm buildings preserved. The latter includes coach-houses, cottages and barns of hand-made English orange brick and a six-sided columbarium or dovecote.

=== AstraZeneca ===
In March 2013, AstraZeneca announced plans to cease R&D work at Alderley Park. A total of 1,600 jobs were to be relocated over three years, mainly to Cambridge, but the company planned to continue non-R&D work at the site. In March 2014, Alderley Park was purchased by Manchester Science Parks – a partnership between Manchester's academic centres and local councils, and investment company Bruntwood.

== Redevelopment ==
In February 2016, planning consent was granted for a £160m masterplan to re-develop the Park which will include significant investment into re-purposing the bioscience campus to one of multiple occupancy, up to 275 homes, a farm shop, village shop, gastropub and new leisure facilities. Construction of the first two phases of houses by PH Homes and PJ Livesey commenced in 2017. Robert Adam, one of the architects for PH Homes' Alderley Park development, was awarded the 2017 Driehaus Architecture Prize at the University of Notre Dame, the highest value architecture award in the world.

As of 2017, over 150 companies are based at Alderley Park, including Royal London, the Medicines Discovery Catapult and the AMR Centre.

== See also ==
- Listed buildings in Nether Alderley
