= William Henry Scott (British Army officer) =

British Army officer

General William Henry Scott (1789–1868) was a British Army officer.

He entered the army in 1805 as an ensign in the Scots Fusilier Guards, now known as the Scots Guards. He accompanied the regiment when it was posted to the Peninsular and was present at the passage of the Douro, the capture of Oporto and the pursuit of General Soult's army. He was later present at the Battle of Talavera in July 1809, where he was wounded through the body. Left behind in hospital when the army retreated, he was made prisoner by the enemy.

In 1811, he was promoted to lieutenant and captain in the Scots Fusilier Guards, in 1815 to captain and lieutenant-colonel, in 1837 brevet-colonel in the army and in 1837 to major and colonel in the regiment. From 1841 to 1844 he was appointed to the command of the regiment, after which he was placed on half-pay. He was made major-general in 1846 and lieutenant-general in 1854.

In 1854 he was given the colonelcy of the 36th (Herefordshire) Regiment of Foot, a position he held until his death, and advanced to the rank of full general on 23 March 1861.

He died at Brighton on 9 November 1868.

== See also ==
- List of British Army full generals

Military offices
Preceded by Lord Frederick FitzClarence	Colonel of the 36th (Herefordshire) Regiment of Foot; 1854–1868	Succeeded by Edward Basil Brooke
