= John Stanley, 1st Baron Stanley of Alderley =

British peer and politician (1766–1850)

The Right Honourable The Lord Stanley of Alderley
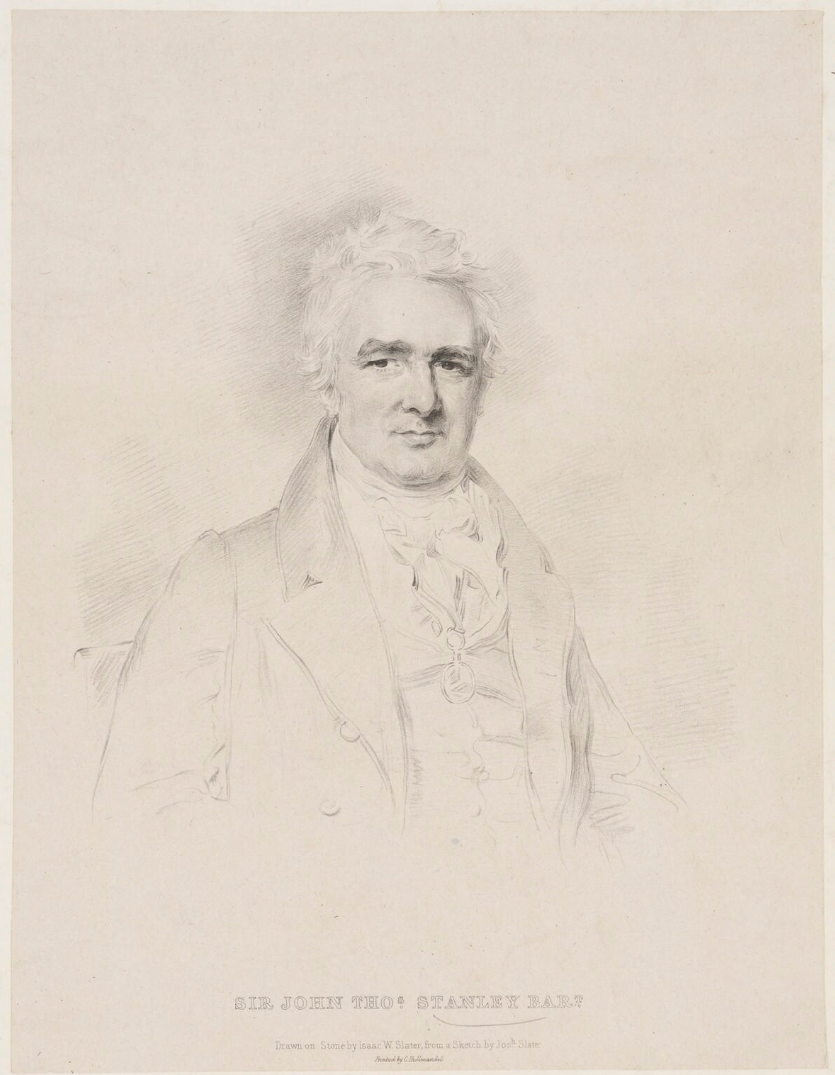
- Lithograph by Isaac Ware Slater, after Joseph Slater Jr.

Member of Parliament for Wootton Bassett
- In office 1790–1796
- Preceded by: Hon. George North
- Succeeded by: John Denison

Member of the House of Lords Lord Temporal
- In office 1839 – 23 October 1850; Hereditary Peerage
- Preceded by: peerage created
- Succeeded by: The 2nd Baron Stanley of Alderley

Personal details
- Born: 26 November 1766 Alderley Park, Cheshire, England
- Died: 23 October 1850 (aged 83) Alderley Park, Cheshire, England
- Spouse: Lady Maria Josepha Holroyd (m. 1796; died 1850)
- Children: 11
- Parent(s): Sir John Thomas Stanley; Margaret Owen

John Thomas Stanley, 1st Baron Stanley of Alderley FRS FSA (26 November 1766 – 23 October 1850), known as Sir John Stanley, 7th Baronet, from 1807 to 1839, was an English peer and politician.

== Early life and education ==
Stanley was born at Alderley Park, Cheshire, the son of Sir John Thomas Stanley FRSE (1735–1827), 6th Baronet. and Margaret Owen, heiress of the Penrhos estate on Anglesey.

This branch of the Stanley family descended from the Hon. Sir John Stanley, third son of Thomas Stanley, 1st Baron Stanley (whose eldest son Thomas was created Earl of Derby in 1485).

He was the elder brother of Edward Stanley, the Bishop of Norwich. His sister, Margaretta Louisa Anne, married Gen. Sir Baldwin Leighton, 6th Baronet.

From 12 to 14 years old, his education was in the hands of Mr. James Six, the inventor of the U-tube maximum-and-minimum thermometer, in a private school in Greenwich. From 14 to 20, he was making the Grand Tour with a tutor. During the years 1781—2 he was at the court of Brunswick. Here, he fell deeply in love with the Princess Caroline, though he was still only fifteen.

But a marriage could not be arranged for him, and the poor girl had the misfortune to become queen to George IV, probably the most worthless of English kings. Poor Stanley was dragged away, and spent the next five years in Neuchâtel, Montpellier and Turin, and later in other parts of Italy.

The young nobleman became acquainted with life in some very polished courts. He became perfectly fluent in French, German and Italian. He climbed Etna and Vesuvius. And he developed scientific interests. When he was 21, he returned to Britain, and studied science at Edinburgh University for two years.

In Edinburgh he became acquainted Joseph Banks, who led an expedition to Iceland in 1772, which may have directed Stanley's attention to the northern countries.

For a young man of 22 thus to lead his own expedition was then quite without precedent. He chartered his own ship, recruited a team of scientific helpers, and carried through the bulk of his ambitious plans during the course of the summer of 1789, finally returning to Edinburgh without the loss of a man, indeed, without serious mishap of any kind.

== Career ==
Stanley succeeded in the baronetcy and to the family seat at Alderley Park in Cheshire on his father's death in 1807. He was appointed High Sheriff of Anglesey for 1809.

He was elected to the House of Commons for Wootton Bassett in 1790, a seat he held until 1796. He was also elected a Fellow of the Royal Society in 1790. In 1839 Stanley was raised to the peerage as Baron Stanley of Alderley, in the County of Chester.

== Marriage and issue ==
Stanley married the Lady Maria Josepha, daughter of John Holroyd, 1st Earl of Sheffield, in 1796. There were 11 children of the marriage; twin sons and seven daughters survived to adulthood.

- Hon. Maria Margaret (20 July 1797 – 24 February 1882), died unmarried
- Hon. Louisa Dorothea (7 November 1799 – 3 June 1877), died unmarried
- Hon. Isabella Louisa (27 May 1801 – 13 May 1839) married in 1826 Sir William Edward Parry, and was mother of Edward Parry. Died two days following the birth of twin sons, who died.
- Hon. Lucy Anne (30 June 1798 – 15 March 1869), married in 1833 Marcus Theodore Hare.
- Hon. Edward John (1802–1869), elder twin who inherited the title
- Hon. William Owen (1802–1884), younger twin and politician
- Hon. Harriot Alethea (23 October 1804 – 24 April 1888), married in 1835 Gen. William Henry Scott
- Hon. Matilda Abigail (9 June 1806 – 28 July 1850), married Henry John Adeane.
- Alfred (15 February 1808 – 24 March 1811), died young
- Hon. Emmeline (28 September 1810 – 31 August 1906), married in 1844 Albert Way
- Elfrida Susannah (15 December 1813 – 17 September 1817), died young

Lord Stanley of Alderley died at Alderley Park in October 1850, aged 83, and was succeeded in his titles by his son Edward, who had already been elevated to the peerage in his own right as Baron Eddisbury.

Lady Stanley of Alderley died in 1863.

== Arms ==
Coat of arms of John Stanley, 1st Baron Stanley of Alderley
Crest On a chapeau gules, turned up ermine, an eagle with wings expanded or preying upon an infant proper, swaddled gules, handed argent. Escutcheon Argent, on a bend azure, three bucks' heads cabossed or, a crescent for difference. Supporters Dexter, a stag or, gorged with a ducal crown, line reflexed over the back, and charged on the shoulder with a mullet azure; sinister, a lion reguardant proper, gorged with a plain collar argent charged with three escallops gules. Motto Sans Changer "Without Changing"

Parliament of Great Britain
Preceded by George Augustus North; Robert Seymour-Conway	Member of Parliament for Wootton Bassett; 1790–1796; With: The Viscount Downe	Succeeded by John Denison; Edward Clarke
Peerage of the United Kingdom
New title	Baron Stanley of Alderley; 1839–1850	Succeeded by Edward John Stanley
Baronetage of England
Preceded by John Thomas Stanley	Baronet (of Alderley); 1807–1850	Succeeded by Edward John Stanley
