= Nether Alderley =

Village and civil parish in England

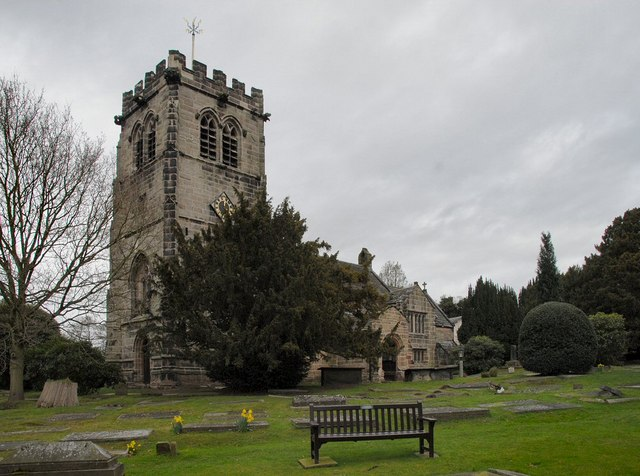
- St. Mary's Church, Nether Alderley

- Location within Cheshire
- Population: 665 (2011)
- OS grid reference: SJ842763
- Civil parish: Nether Alderley
- Unitary authority: Cheshire East
- Ceremonial county: Cheshire
- Region: North West
- Country: England
- Sovereign state: United Kingdom
- Post town: MACCLESFIELD
- Postcode district: SK10
- Dialling code: 01625
- Police: Cheshire
- Fire: Cheshire
- Ambulance: North West
- UK Parliament: Tatton

Nether Alderley is a village and civil parish in Cheshire, England, on the A34 a mile and a half south of Alderley Edge. The civil parish includes the hamlets of Monk's Heath and Soss Moss.

At Monk's Heath crossroads, the A34 crosses the A537. The AstraZeneca research laboratories at Alderley Park house 260 cancer research scientists.

At the 2011 census, the population was 665.

== Dean Green ==
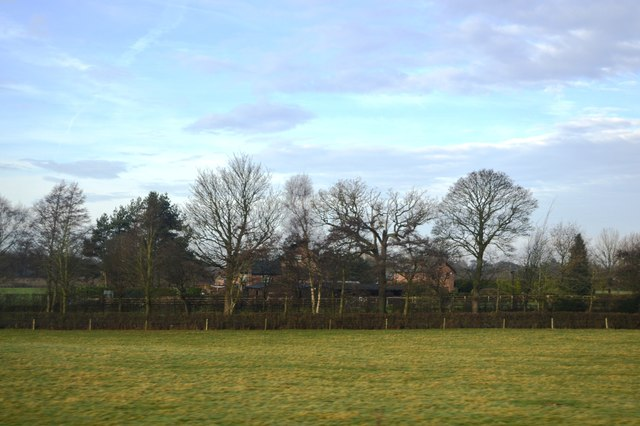
Farmland at Dean Green

Dean Green (53.284°N 2.248°W) is a hamlet of the civil parish of Nether Alderley in the unitary authority of Cheshire East.

== Landmarks ==
St Mary's Church, Nether Alderley, is a Grade I listed building, described by Nickolaus Pevsner as "unexpectedly and picturesquely irregular". Nether Alderley Mill is a 16th-century watermill owned by the National Trust and designated at Grade II*.

== Notable residents ==
- David Beckham and his wife, pop star Victoria Beckham, used to have a house in Nether Alderley.
- Neil Hamilton and his wife Christine used to live next door to St Mary's Church in Nether Alderley.
- Ole Gunnar Solskjær has a house in Nether Alderley.
- Henry de Motlowe, judge and politician, was the local landowner in the 1340s and 1350s

== See also ==
- Listed buildings in Nether Alderley
- Alderley Park
- Gatley Green
